= Irving Group of Companies =

Canadian conglomerate

The Irving Group of Companies is an informal name given to companies owned and controlled by the Irving family of New Brunswick—descendants of Canadian industrialist K.C. Irving: his sons James K. (1928–2024), Arthur (1930–2024), and John (1932–2010), and their respective children.

== Ownership structure ==
Many of the components of the Irving Group of Companies were established or acquired by K.C. Irving during his period of active entrepreneurship between the 1920s and the 1970s. Following his retirement to Bermuda in the 1970s, the conglomerate was operated by his three sons in much the same manner and remained relatively intact and maintained a strong vertical integration. The companies were divided into similar divisions, each controlled by one of K.C. Irving's sons and their respective children.

- James K. Irving (1928–2024) (also known as "J.K.") – ownership and responsibility for J.D. Irving, Limited and its subsidiaries. This conglomerate has interests in several industries including forestry, integrated forest products, building supplies, frozen food, transportation, shipping lines, and shipbuilding.
- Arthur Irving (1930–2024) (also known as "Art") - ownership and responsibility for Irving Oil and its subsidiaries. This conglomerate has ownership of its retail stores, oil refineries, oil tankers and distribution terminals and facilities.
- John E. Irving (1932–2010) (also known as "Jack") – ownership and responsibility for Ocean Capital, which includes companies such as Commercial Properties, OSCO Construction Group, Source Atlantic and Acadia Broadcasting, Limited.

== J.D. Irving, Limited ==
J.D. Irving, Limited is a holding company that primarily covers the Group's pulp and paper, transportation, and shipbuilding.

=== Agriculture and food ===
- Cavendish Agri Services
- Cavendish Farms — includes both retail and foodservice divisions
  - Indian River Farms
  - Riverdale Foods
- Juniper Farms

=== Construction and equipment ===
- CFM Service (amalgamation of Custom Fabricators & Machinists, Atlantic Quality & Technical Services, and Atlantic NDT Inc.)
- Gulf Operators
- Irving Equipment (crane rental, heavy lifting, specialized transportation, pile driving and project management services)
- Atlantic Wallboard
- Kent Homes
- Kent Mobile Shelters
- Grandview Civil Contractors
- Pumps Plus

=== Forestry and forest products ===
JDI's Pulp & Paper Division, Sawmills and Woodlands Division includes the following forestry and forest product companies:

- Irving Lumber & Value-Added Products
- Irving Pulp & Paper
- Irving Paper Ltd.
- Irving Tissue
- Irving Woodlands
- Irving Sawmills
- Grand River Pellets
- Maritime Innovation
- Clearwater Construction
- Juniper Organics
- Forest Patrol
- Irving Forest Services
- Lake Utopia Paper
- St. George Power — run-of-the-river hydroelectric facility

=== Irving Consumer Products ===
Irving Consumer Products includes several brand-name and private-label tissue products.

Irving Consumer Products operates 5 tissue manufacturing plants: 3 in Canada (Saint John and Dieppe, New Brunswick, and Toronto, Ontario) and 2 in the United States (Fort Edward, New York and Macon, Georgia).

- Irving Tissue (Royale, Majesta, Scotties (U.S.))
- Irving Personal Care — the only manufacturer of baby diapers and training pants in Canada

=== JDI Integrated Logistics ===
JDI Integrated Logistics (formerly Irving Transportation Services) is the transportation and logistics division of the company, which owns several railroad networks in Maine and New Brunswick, as well as major trucking companies.

- Atlantic Towing
- Midland
  - Midland Transport
  - Midland Courier
  - Midland Logistics & Freight Brokerage
- New Brunswick Railway (NBM Railways)
  - New Brunswick Southern Railway Co. Ltd.
  - Eastern Maine Railway Co. Ltd.
  - Maine Northern Railway Co. Ltd.
- RST Industries
- Sunbury Transport
- Kent Line
- JDI Logistics
- Harbour Development

=== Retail and distribution ===
Irving Retail Services includes several retailer services and business-to-business suppliers.

- Chandler Sales
- Kent Building Supplies
- Universal Truck & Trailer (UTT) — Atlantic Canada's largest heavy duty and truck and trailer dealer
- Plasticraft Digital & Specialty Printing — full-service specialty and digital print provider
- Atlas Structural Systems — manufacturer of pre-engineered structural systems
- Industrial Commercial Supplies (ICS) — retailer of commercial and industrial building materials
- Maritime Home Improvement
- Bayside Distribution

=== Shipbuilding and industrial fabrication ===
JDI's Shipbuilding & Industrial Fabrication companies and facilities include:

- Irving Shipbuilding
  - Bluenose Building
  - East Isle Shipyard
  - Halifax Shipyard
  - Marine Fabricators
  - Saint John Shipbuilding
  - Woodside Industries
- Fleetway, Inc.
  - Oceanic Consulting Corporation

=== Other subsidiaries ===
- Protrans Personnel Services Inc.
- Industrial Security Inc.
- Trans-Canada College
- Moncton Wildcats

=== Former subsidiaries ===
- Acadian Lines Ltd.
- SMT (Eastern) Ltd. Bus Lines
- Saint John City Transit
- Irving Industrial Rentals
- Lexi-Tech International
- Barrington Environmental Services
- Barrington Industrial Services
- Commercial Equipment
- Maritime Tire
- M.I.T.I (Xwave)
- Hawk Communications
- Steel and Engine Products Ltd.
- Scot Truck
- MITV (now CIHF-DT and CHNB-DT)
- CHSJ-TV (now CBAT-DT)
- Shelburne Ship Repair — sold to Mersey Seafoods in 2022

==== Brunswick News ====
Until 2022, J.D. Irving owned Brunswick News, the largest newspaper publisher in New Brunswick and owner of the province's three major newspapers. On 17 February 2022 Postmedia Network announced that it was buying BNI from the Irving company.

- Telegraph-Journal (Saint John NB)
- Times & Transcript (Moncton NB)
- The Daily Gleaner (Fredericton NB)
- The Tribune (Campbellton NB)
- La Voix du Restigouche (Campbellton NB)
- The Bugle-Observer (Woodstock NB)
- Le Journal Madawaska (Edmundston NB)
- L'Étoile (various editions)
  - Édition provinciale
  - Édition La Cataracte (Grand Falls NB)
  - Édition Chaleur (Bathurst NB)
  - Édition Dieppe (Dieppe NB)
  - Édition Kent (Bouctouche NB)
  - Édition Péninsule (Shippagan NB)
  - Édition République (Edmundston NB)
  - Édition Restigouche (Campbellton NB)
  - Édition Shédiac (Shediac NB)
- Kings County Record (Sussex NB)
- Miramichi Leader (Miramichi NB)
- The Northern Light (Bathurst NB)
- Here (Saint John NB, Moncton NB, Fredericton NB)

== Irving Oil, Limited ==
- Irving Oil Saint John Refinery
- Whitegate Refinery
- Irving Energy Services Ltd. (home heating fuel)
- Irving Energy Distribution and Marketing
- Irving Propane (formerly Atlantic Speedy Propane)
- Irving Aviation — supplier of aviation fuel and ownership of FBOs in Atlantic Canada
  - Gander FBO at Gander International Airport
  - Goose Bay FBO at Goose Bay Airport
  - St. John’s FBO at St. John’s International Airport
  - Halifax FBO at Stanfield International Airport
- Fort Reliance
  - Portage Energy Limited
- Canaport — deepwater ultra large crude carrier terminal
- Irving Blending & Packaging — automotive & commercial vehicle lubricants and degreasers
- Over 1200 retail locations throughout Eastern Canada and New England including several Big Stops
- A fleet of tractor-trailers delivering a variety of fuels to its wholesale, commercial and retail customers
- Over a dozen regional distribution terminals

Former

- Canaport LNG — deepwater liquified natural gas terminal; Irving Oil sold its share to Repsol YPF in 2021. IO was formerly a 25% partner, with 75% held by Repsol YPF.

== Ocean Capital ==
- Source Atlantic (a group of several companies Gilco Bearings, Mobile Valve, Thornes, Rubber & Rigging, Engineered Products & Services, NL Eldridge, Schooner Industrial, Millennium Welding, Moore Industrial Edmonton Regina Saskatoon Winnipeg and Calgary)
- PetroService, Limited
- Commercial Properties Limited
- OSCO Construction Group
  - Steel
    - Ocean Steel Ltd. (structural steel & rebar)
    - Ocean Steel Corp. (structural steel)
    - Allstar Rebar
    - York Steel
  - Concrete
    - Strescon Ltd. (prestressed cast concrete)
    - Borcherdt Concrete Products
    - OSCO Concrete
    - OSCO Aggregates
  - Construction (commercial, institutional and industrial construction)
    - FCC Construction & Engineering
    - Marque Construction
- Acadia Broadcasting Ltd. (formerly New Brunswick Broadcasting Company)

A selection of the 17 radio stations owned and operated by Acadia Broadcasting

- CKBW-FM, CJHK-FM (Bridgewater, Nova Scotia)
- CHSJ-FM, CHWV-FM (Saint John, New Brunswick)
- CHTD-FM (St. Stephen, New Brunswick)
- Northwoods Broadcasting Ltd.
- CKDR-FM (Dryden, Ontario)
- CFOB-FM (Fort Frances, Ontario)
- CJRL-FM (Kenora, Ontario)
- CKTG-FM, CJUK-FM (Thunder Bay, Ontario)

== Criticisms ==
=== Lack of transparency ===
Irving companies are private companies; as a result, there is less public information available as there would be for publicly traded corporations. This lack of transparency has led to significant criticism regarding Irving business activities.

=== Vertical integration ===
Irving companies are often criticized for their vertical integration. Examples of vertical integration within the "Irving Group of Companies" (as the Irving family refers to their holdings) include the acquisition or formation of businesses along the entire chain of production, from the Irving refinery (an Irving Oil subsidiary) and its retail outlets, to the transportation subsidiaries of J.D. Irving (RST, Midland, NB Southern, Sunbury), to various construction and engineering companies that assist in building, maintaining and expanding the conglomerate's facilities.

Further examples of vertical integration within the conglomerate include Industrial Security Ltd. (ISL), the wholly owned security company that guards facilities, as well as industrial suppliers such as Thornes, Universal Sales and Commercial Equipment Ltd. which provide specialty goods and services to its companies. J.D. Irving, the sister firm to Irving Oil, is a dominant forestry company in northeastern North America, growing trees, harvesting trees and producing lumber, pulp and paper, and various enhanced value products such as glossy paper grades, tissue, and personal care products.

=== Provincial media monopoly ===
The Dominion newspaper, an independent Canadian newspaper, has criticized Irving's ownership of Brunswick News, which published most newspapers in New Brunswick, as well as the newspapers' journalistic integrity, particularly when reporting on companies controlled by the Irving family such as Irving Oil. Canadian Business magazine wrote in a profile of the Irving Group in 2008, "A Senate committee that recently probed media ownership in Canada expressed concerns about the family’s near-monopoly over the province’s print media and "the implications of a dominant media force linked to a dominant industrial base." While a Brunswick News official denied any pro-Irving bias in the papers’ coverage, the committee’s 2006 report cited other witnesses who feared that Irving journalists exercise restraint and self-edit when writing about the family — "unconscious loyalty to the parental control," as one put it."

=== Political patronage ===
In 2003, there were accusations of Irving family political patronage, notably involving Allan Rock and Claudette Bradshaw of the Liberal Party of Canada. In 2016, the National Observer released an eight-part investigation on the family called House of Irving. It looked at many parts of the businesses including the expansion into Maine, its media monopoly, how they intimidate their critics and issues within the family.

=== Ecological degradation ===
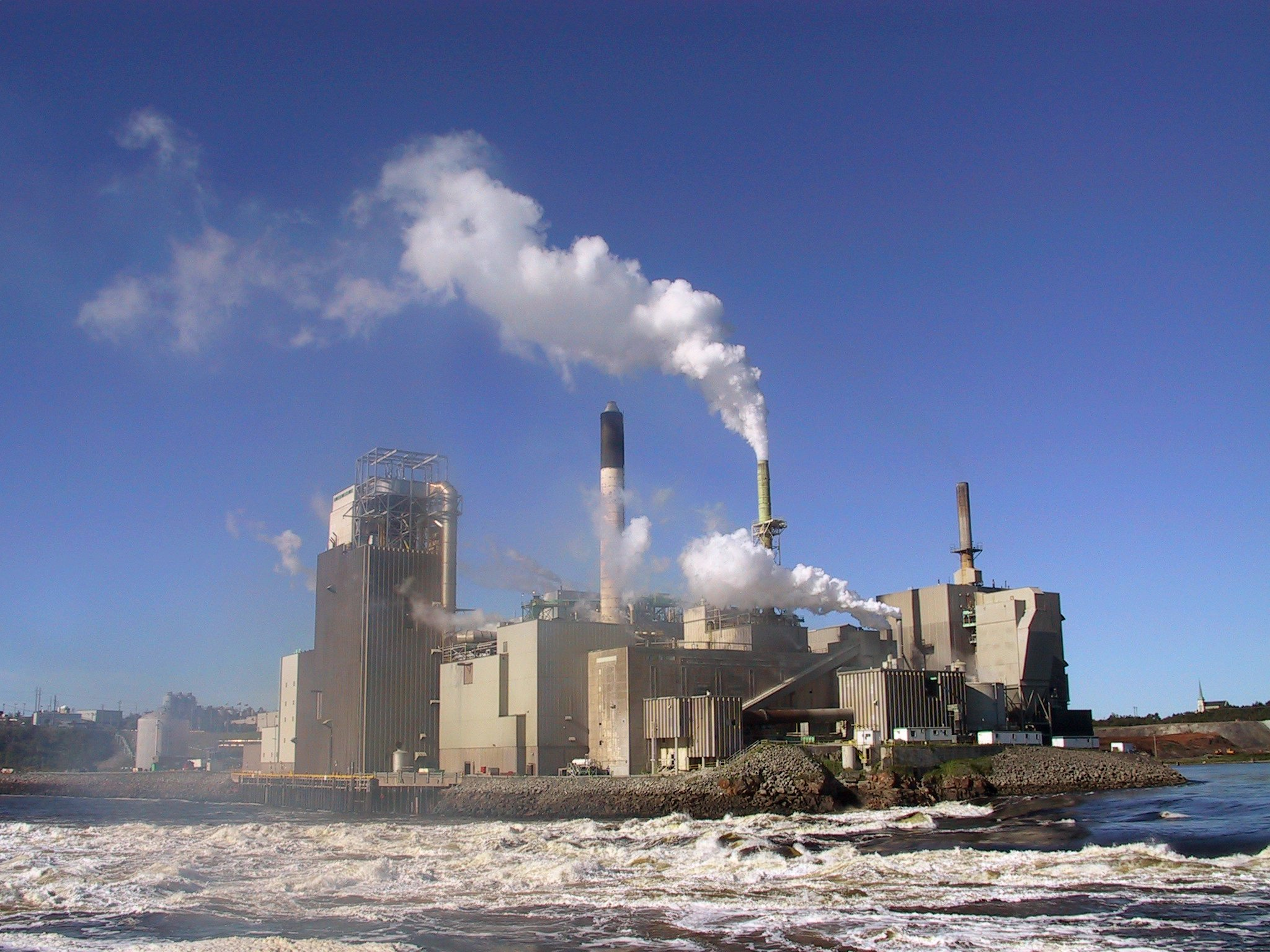
The J. D. Irving pulp & paper mill in Saint John.

Irving-owned facilities have been shown to emit a mixture of carcinogens, including benzene and lead. In 2009, the Conservation Council of New Brunswick produced a study which found that rates of lung cancer were 40 to 50 percent higher in Saint John than in Fredericton and Moncton – New Brunswick’s other major cities. In 2018 the Irving Pulp and Paper Ltd. pleaded guilty to three charges under the federal Fisheries Act related to numerous "significant" instances of effluent discharges from its pulp mill in west Saint John into the St. John River over a two-year period. This was the fourth time that this fine was issued in a period of two years.
