= Rothesay Netherwood School =

School in New Brunswick, Canada

Location
- 40 College Hill Road; Rothesay, New Brunswick, E2E 5H1; Canada; 45.37978°N 65.99224°W

Information
- School type: Independent Day/Boarding Co-Ed
- Founded: 1874 Thompson School by Ezekiel Stone Wiggins; 1877 - Rothesay Collegiate School; 1894 - Netherwood School
- Oversight: Board of Directors
- Head of School: Paul McLellan (2016-present)
- Grades: 6-12
- Enrollment: 278 (September 2018)
- Language: English
- Campus: 200-acre (0.81 km^{2}) campus overlooking the Kennebecasis River
- Colours: Green and Blue
- Team name: Riverhawks
- Website: www.rns.cc

Rothesay Netherwood School is a Canadian independent day and boarding university-preparatory school for grades 6–12 located in Rothesay, New Brunswick, a suburb of Saint John, New Brunswick, Canada. It has been an International Baccalaureate World School since April 2007. It is an accredited member of Canadian Accredited Independent Schools (CAIS), a founding member of the ACIS (Atlantic Conference of Independent Schools), a member of CIS (Conference of Independent Schools), a member of TABS (The Association of Boarding Schools), and a member of the international organization Round Square. The current Head of School is Paul McLellan (appointed 2016).

Rothesay Netherwood School is an independent private school offering both the Canadian High School Diploma as well as the International Baccalaureate Diploma. The school is located on a 200 acres (810,000 m^{2}) campus overlooking the Kennebecasis River in Rothesay, New Brunswick.

== Introduction ==
Rothesay Netherwood School was founded in 1877 and is the result of the merger of two separate schools: Rothesay Collegiate School for boys and Netherwood School for girls. The two schools had a history of co-involvement since the 1890s and officially merged in 1984 for financial reasons. The merged school was known as Rothesay Collegiate School Netherwood until 2002, when the current name was adopted. The current campus is that of the original Rothesay Collegiate School. The campus of Netherwood School for girls was sold and developed at the time of the merger.

== History ==
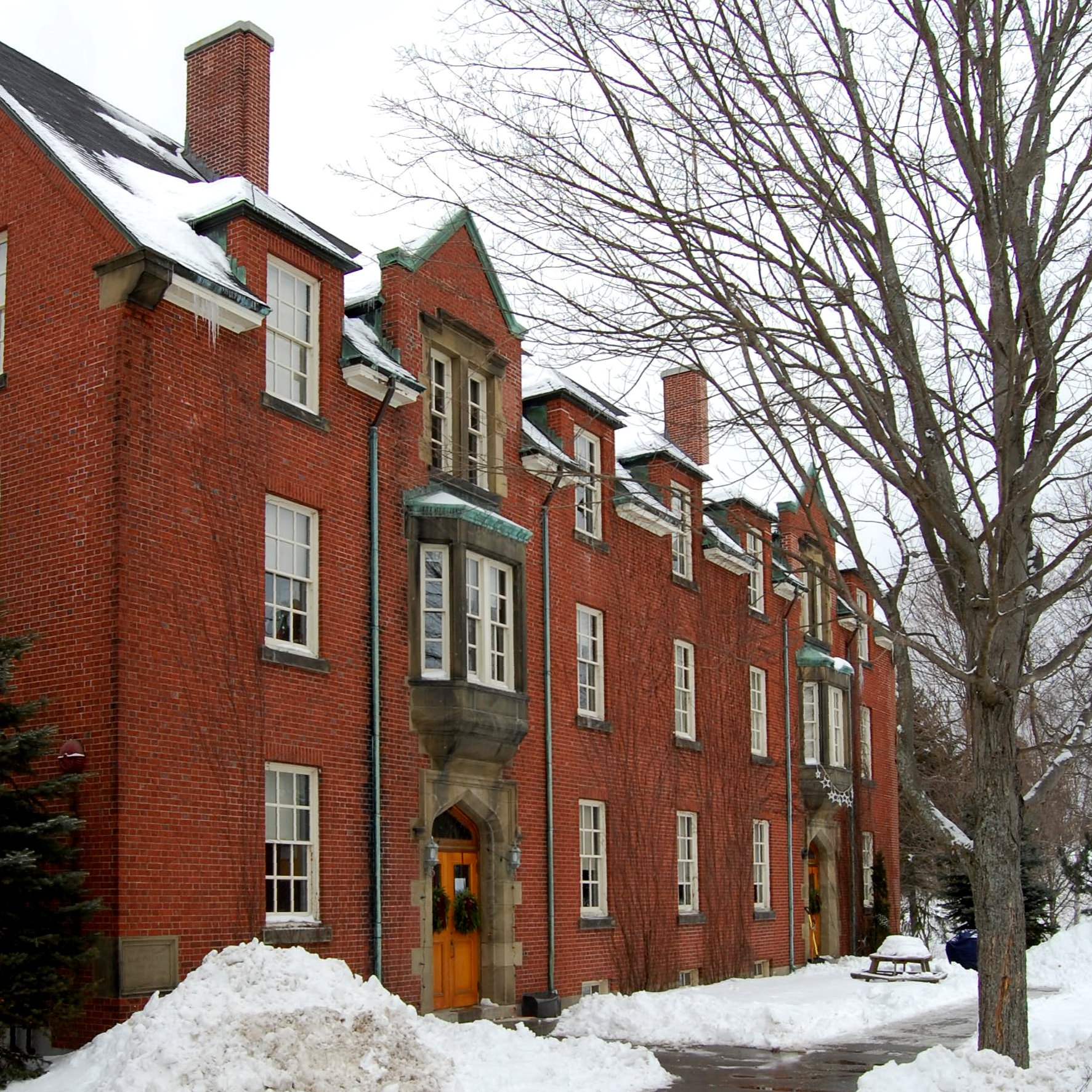
Mackay House, Rothesay Netherwood School

=== Rothesay Collegiate School ===
Professor Ezekiel Stone Wiggins founded Thompson's School in 1874, a boys' day school housed upstairs in Whelpley Hall near the Rothesay railway station, in Rothesay, an affluent suburb of Saint John, New Brunswick. The school was intended to prepare students for enrollment into the Royal Military College of Canada, which was established in 1877.

In the 1880s the school was bought by George Lloyd, later leader of the group of colonists who founded the town of Lloydminster, Alberta and Bishop of Saskatchewan, who renamed it Rothesay College for Boys.

In 1891, the school received funding by James F. Robertson, who renamed it Rothesay Collegiate School and moved it to its present location while adding boarding facilities. Lloyd remained headmaster until 1900. In 1907 Robertson handed the school over to the Synod of the Anglican Diocese of Fredericton and Rev. W.R. Hibbard was appointed headmaster the following year. Dr. Hibbard was succeeded by Dr. C.H. Bonnycastle in 1938 but the school was run by his assistant, Dr J.F.L. Jackson, while Dr. Bonnycastle served as an officer in the Royal Canadian Navy during World War II. In 1963, the school was incorporated and leased to an independent Board of Governors. Following Dr. Bonnycastle's retirement in 1970, a series of five headmasters presided over the school for next 17 years.

=== Netherwood School ===
Girls were first enrolled at Thompson's School until its move in 1891. The Netherwood School for girls was founded in 1894 by Miss M. Gregory who was succeeded in 1895 by her niece, Mrs. J. Armstrong. In 1903, Miss E. Pitcher became co-principal with Dr. Susan B. Ganong at a time when it had only nine students. One of the most important people in the school's history, Dr. Ganong purchased the facility in 1912 and built it into an internationally recognized institution of high scholastic standing. She presided over Netherwood until her retirement in 1944 when she sold the school to the Netherwood Foundation Limited. Dr. Ganong was succeeded by several headmistresses that presided for relatively short terms.

=== Merger ===
In the 1970s the New Brunswick government began investing heavily in the public education system and RCS and Netherwood were subsequently challenged to maintain enrollment. In 1972 the schools formed a partnership that led to shared classes but separate campuses. Nevertheless, financial difficulties continued and were exacerbated by the lack of long-term strategy caused by a series of short-term Heads at each school. In 1984, RCS and Netherwood announced that they would both be closing. A group of parents and alumni came forward with a proposal to obtain financing and combine the two schools. The schools, now merged into RCS-Netherwood, were saved but this success came at the expense of the sacrificed Netherwood Campus.

=== Recent years ===
Between 1984 and 1991 over 2 million dollars were raised for the school, allowing it to continue; since 1991 the school has increased its enrollment by two-and-a-half times. From 1995-1996 a new fundraising campaign led to the construction and renovation of several buildings. In June 2002 RNS's newest boys' residence, Kirk House, opened. Collegiate Hall was opened in 2005 and now houses the school's offices and conference rooms. In 2006, 'Netherwood' House opened as the school's junior girls' residence. In 2009, a new dining hall was added to the campus, Heritage Hall, and the former dining hall was renovated into the school's library. In 2014, the school completed an expansion to its ice arena, and in 2018 built a fitness center.

== Today ==
=== Campus ===
Rothesay Netherwood School is located in Rothesay, New Brunswick, approximately ten minutes east of the city of Saint John, New Brunswick. The campus is situated on 200 acres (810,000 m^{2}) of land in the Kennebecasis River valley, with much of this space is given over to woodlands and sports fields. The campus consists of:

- Four boarding residences housing up to 140 students: Mackay House, Quinn House, Kirk House and Netherwood House;
- Thirteen houses and nine apartments for faculty;
- Heritage Hall - newest dining hall, with three giant projector screens.
- South House, providing faculty offices and housing student artwork;
- Collegiate Hall, the main administration building;
- Fawcett Hall - housing the Colin Mackay Library;
- The Memorial Chapel, designed by G. Ernest Fairweather and F. DeLancey Robinson in 1923 in memory of the Old Boys who lost their lives in the Great War;
- School House, with seventeen classrooms;
- Hibbard Hall (The English building);
- Science Hall - 40,000 square-foot academic building that is a centre of excellence in innovation and STEM curriculum;
- The Théâtre Susan B. Ganong Performing Arts Centre, with seating for 200;
- The Dr. C.H. Bonnycastle Memorial Arena, with its fitness center;
- The Irving Gymnasium, with regulation basketball, volleyball and badminton courts and a climbing wall;
- Five soccer and rugby fields;
- Two squash courts;
- A fitness center;
- Numerous walking trails

The school's World War I Memorial Chapel features several World War II memorial stained glass windows including `Resurrection of Christ`; `Virgin and Child` (1946); `Light of the World` (1945); `St. George`; `Military figure`; and `Boy Christ in the carpenter's Shop` by Robert McCausland Limited.

In 1985, the RCS campus served as the backdrop for the William Hurt and Marlee Matlin feature film Children of a Lesser God. Many of the buildings on campus were prominently featured in the film.

== Notable alumni ==
- Gretta Chambers, journalist and former Chancellor of McGill University
- Gordon Fairweather, leading Canadian lawyer and politician.
- Jack Fairweather (politician), politician
- Aida McAnn Flemming, educator
- R. Whidden Ganong, businessman
- Richard Hatfield, Premier of New Brunswick
- John Peters Humphrey, principal author of the Universal Declaration of Human Rights.
- James Irving, leading member of the Irving family and head of the J.D. Irving pulp and paper and shipbuilding.
- Arthur Irving, leading member of the Irving family and head of Irving Oil.
- Jack Irving, leading member of the Irving family.
- Willard Mitchell, artist
- Derek Oland, CEO and majority owner of Moosehead Brewery, the largest 100% Canadian-owned brewery.
- Barbara Pratt, artist
- Graham W. S. Scott, lawyer
