= James Irving =

James Irving may refer to:

- James K. Irving (1928–2024), Canadian businessman
- James Gordon Irving (1913–2012), American illustrator
- James Dergavel Irving (1860–1933), Canadian businessman
- James Irving (slave trader) (1759–1791), Scottish slave trader, ship captain and surgeon
