= James Dergavel Irving =

Canadian businessman (1860–1933)

- Born: October 15, 1860; New Brunswick, British North America
- Died: June 6, 1933 (aged 72)
- Occupation: Businessman
- Children: 5, including K. C. Irving

James Dargavel Irving (October 15, 1860 – June 6, 1933) was a Canadian businessman based in Bouctouche, New Brunswick. He was the patriarch of the Irving family, having been the father to K. C. Irving.

== Life ==
Irving was born on October 15, 1860 to Herbert Irving, the son of immigrants from Dumfries, Scotland, and his wife, Catherine Dergavel. Irving, who was referred to by his initials J. D., had six siblings: two sisters and four brothers. In 1881, at the age of 21, Irving bought a small sawmill in Bouctouche, and would additionally own a farm where he would raise cattle, silver foxes, and grow vegetables.

J. D. Irving had a son and a daughter with his wife Minnie Hutchinson Irving. After Minnie's death, Irving remarried to Mary Elizabeth Irving (née Gifford) and had two daughters and a son, K. C. Irving, who would grow up to be an industrialist. J. D. Irving was considered to be a major entrepreneur in Kent County and was the owner and operator of "a sawmill, gristmill, carding mill, a general store, lumber business and three farms."

J. D. is cited as being the founder of the modern-day holding company J.D. Irving Limited within the Irving Group of Companies. J. D. Irving Ltd grew significantly under his son, K. C., later his grandsons J. K., Art, and Jack, and their children.

Irving died in Buctouche on June 6, 1933, at the age of 72.

== See also ==
- J.D. Irving Limited
- K.C. Irving
- Irving Group of Companies

== Bibliography ==
- DeMont, John (1992). Citizens Irving: K.C. Irving and his legacy: the story of Canada's wealthiest family. Toronto: Doubleday Canada. ISBN 978-0-385-25313-0.
