= Irving family (New Brunswick) =

Canadian family

The Irving family is a wealthy Maritime family located mostly in New Brunswick, Canada.

== Description ==
1. The Irving family is a Canadian business dynasty based in New Brunswick, whose descendants control several major privately held industrial enterprises. Among Canada's wealthiest families, the Irvings have been a dominant force in the economic development of Atlantic Canada for more than a century. Their businesses have expanded into an internationally diversified group of enterprises spanning petroleum refining, forestry, manufacturing, agriculture, food production, transportation, shipbuilding, construction, real estate and retail. The family's business origins date to 1882, when James Dergavel Irving (1860–1933) established a lumber business in Bouctouche, New Brunswick. His son, Kenneth Colin (K.C.) Irving (1899–1992), transformed the family enterprise into a major industrial conglomerate, expanding into petroleum, transportation, forestry, construction, shipbuilding and other industries. K.C. Irving became one of Canada's wealthiest industrialists, developing an extensive network of vertically integrated businesses that occupied a central position in New Brunswick's economy. The family's industrial interests subsequently developed into three principal business groups associated with K.C. Irving's sons and their descendants: J.D. Irving, Limited, associated with James K. Irving (1928–2024); Irving Oil, associated with Arthur Irving (1930–2024); and Ocean Capital, associated with the family of John E. Irving (1932–2010). Although the businesses share a common history, the principal groups operate under separate family ownership structures. Their combined activities extend across Canada, the United States and Europe. The Irving enterprises occupy significant positions in several strategically important Canadian industries. Irving Oil operates Canada's largest petroleum refinery in Saint John, New Brunswick, with crude-processing capacity exceeding 320,000 barrels per day. The company also operates the Whitegate Refinery in Ireland, the country's only petroleum refinery, with capacity of up to 75,000 barrels per day. Its operations include more than 1,000 fuelling locations and an extensive network of petroleum distribution facilities serving eastern Canada, New England and Ireland. J.D. Irving, Limited is one of Atlantic Canada's largest privately owned industrial groups, employing approximately 20,000 people. Its operations encompass eight major business sectors: agriculture, construction and equipment, consumer products, food, forestry and forest products, retail and distribution, shipbuilding and industrial fabrication, and transportation and logistics. Its constituent businesses include Cavendish Farms, Irving Tissue, Kent Building Supplies and major transportation and manufacturing operations throughout North America. The family's forestry holdings are among the largest privately owned timberland portfolios in North America. Through J.D. Irving, Limited, the family owns approximately 3.2 million acres (1.3 million hectares) of private forest land in Canada and the United States, while managing an additional 2.6 million acres (1.06 million hectares) of publicly owned Crown forest in New Brunswick. These holdings support an extensive network of forestry, pulp and paper, lumber and consumer-products manufacturing facilities. Through Irving Shipbuilding in Halifax, Nova Scotia, the family is also a major participant in Canada's National Shipbuilding Strategy. The company has been selected to construct 15 River-class destroyers for the Royal Canadian Navy, a project described by the Government of Canada as the country's largest and most complex shipbuilding initiative since the Second World War. In March 2025, Irving Shipbuilding received an initial implementation contract valued at approximately C$8 billion for the first three destroyers, with construction forming part of a multidecade program to renew Canada's naval fleet. The family's third principal business group, Ocean Capital, is headquartered in Saint John and maintains investments in construction, real estate, broadcasting, distribution and industrial services. Its holdings include businesses operating in multiple Canadian provinces, extending the family's economic interests beyond its petroleum, forestry and manufacturing enterprises. The Irving family remains among Canada's wealthiest business families. In January 2026, Oxfam Canada estimated the family's combined net worth at approximately C$15.8 billion, an increase of C$1.33 billion from its 2024 estimate. Public estimates of the family's fortune are complicated by the privately held nature of its enterprises and the separate ownership of businesses among different branches of the family. Across successive generations, the family's businesses have made substantial investments in industrial infrastructure, manufacturing capacity, natural resources and transportation networks, giving the Irvings an unusually extensive economic presence in New Brunswick and across Atlantic Canada. Family members and their charitable foundations have also supported universities, healthcare institutions, environmental research and community organizations. The historical concentration of the family's economic power, its corporate ownership structures and the environmental impacts of its industrial operations have also attracted public scrutiny.

== Wealth ==
J.K. Irving's fortune was estimated by Forbes as between $4.1 billion and $8.3 billion between 2012 and 2022. Arthur's wealth was estimated to be between $1.9 billion to $5.5 billion. The tax affairs of the family were reported on by German newspaper Süddeutsche Zeitung and the International Consortium of Investigative Journalists after making their way into the public domain via the release of the Paradise Papers.

== Businesses ==
KC Irving started the family business empire by opening a gas station in Bouctouche. Since then the range of businesses owned has grown to over 250 located throughout Canada and the United States. In 2017, the various petrochemical, logistics, retail, and media companies were estimated to be worth $10 billion.

James K. Irving-led lumber and paper business Irving Pulp and Paper is the largest private sector employer in New Brunswick. Irving Oil, led by Arthur Irving is the largest oil refinery in Canada.

== List of members ==
Italics denotes the person is married to the person above, and is thus not a member of the family by birth.

- K. C. Irving (1899–1992), billionaire oil businessman, his business was split up upon his death. Estimated 20 billion modern dollars.
- Harriet Lila MacNarin Irving (1899–1976), namesake of the Harriet Irving Botanical Gardens, co-founder of the K. C. Irving Environmental Sciences Centre, founder of the Harriet Irving Library, first wife K. C.
- Winnifred Johnston Irving (1917–2018), philanthropist, most often known simply as Mrs. Irving, second wife of K. C.
  - John E. Irving (1932–2010), owner of construction, engineering, and concrete and steel fabrication companies. 5.8 billion dollar net worth.
    - Colonel John K. F. Irving (born c. 1960), graduated from Harvard, president of Acadia Broadcasting, he took over most of his father's responsibilities after his death.
        - 3 children of Colonel John and Elizabeth.
      - Colin D. Irving (1963–2019), he did not follow the family's business interests and worked as a charitable volunteer and filmmaker.
      - Anne Irving Oxley (born c. 1964), graduate of Harvard, campaign chair of the Harvard Graduate School of Design.
      - John Oxley, retired real estate development executive, husband of Anne.
    - Arthur Irving (1930–2024), owner of Irving Oil and its refineries. 4.2 billion dollar net worth.
    - Sandra Ring Irving, philanthropist, Arthur's current wife.
      - Tasha Irving, wife of Kenneth
    - James K. Irving (1928–2024), owner of Brunswick News and J. D. Irving, Limited. 6.9 billion dollar net worth.
    - Jean E. Irving, ONB (1926–2019), Philanthropist and art collector. Net worth of 900 million at her death. Wife of James.
      - James K. Irving Jr. (born c. 1960), co-CEO of J.D. Irving Ltd along with his brother Robert.
      - Robert Irving (1954–2026), co-CEO of J. D. Irving. He was also president of the Moncton Wildcats.
      - Judith "Judy" Irving, former owner of Hawk Communications.
      - Paul Zed (born 1956), a member of Parliament, former husband of Judith.
        - Andrew Zed, legal counsel of Canadian Tire.
        - Lisa Dunlop, Deloitte executive, Andrew's wife. (Daughter of Robert H. Dunlop III, chief executive and owner of the Madison Racquet & Swim Club and Maxine Martens-Dunlop, co-owner of Martens & Heads)
        - Four other children of Judith and Paul.
      - Mary Jean Irving (born c. 1960), she is the richest person in Prince Edward Island with a net worth upwards of 250 million.

== See also ==
- Sobey family
- Weston family
