= Golden Ball Building =

Former office building in Saint John, New Brunswick

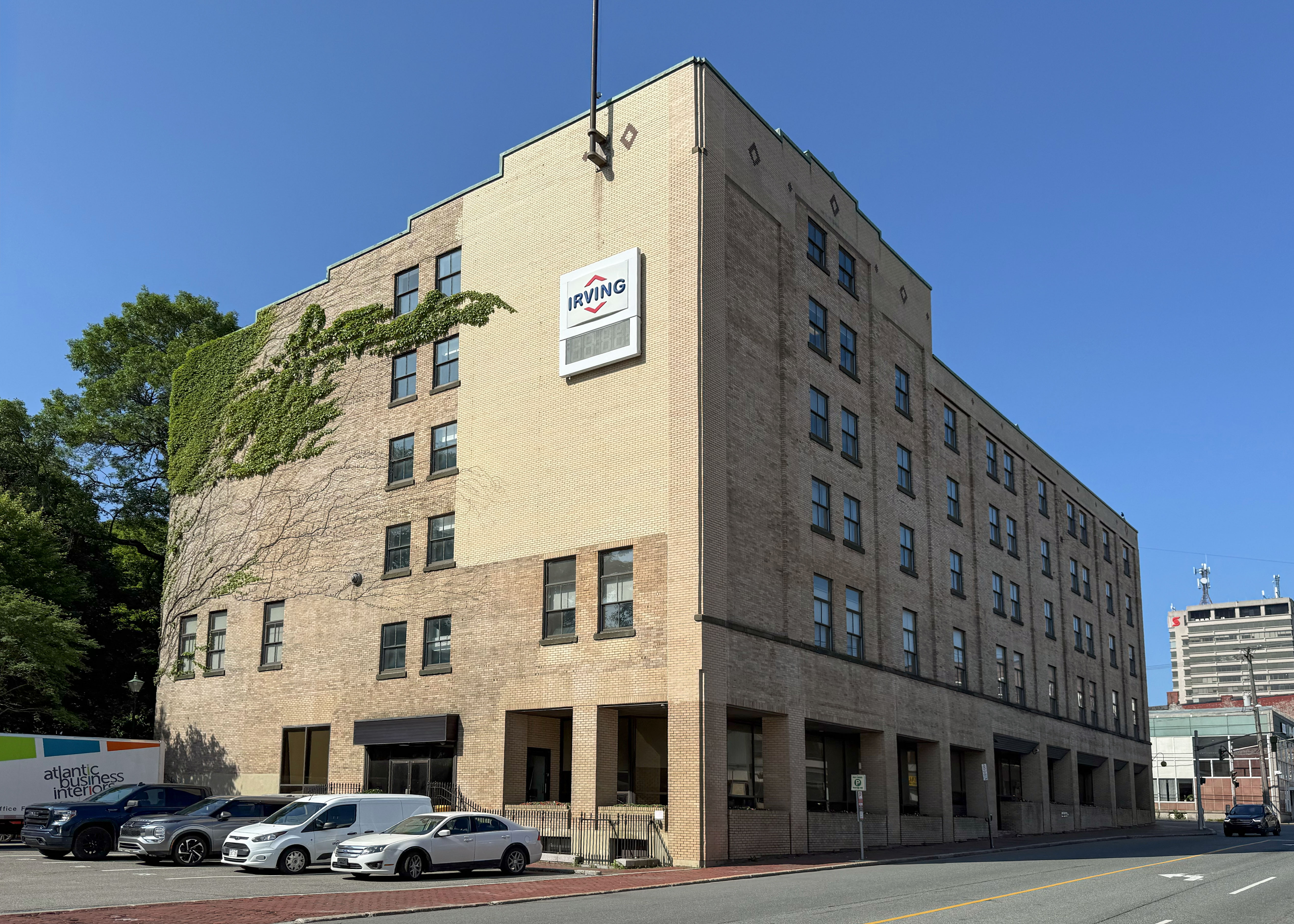
- The building in 2025
- Interactive map of the Golden Ball Building area

General information
- Location: 10 Sydney Street, Saint John, New Brunswick, Canada
- Coordinates: 45.275°N 66.057°W
- Year built: 1931
- Owner: J.D. Irving Limited

Technical details
- Floor count: 5
- Floor area: 68,957 sq ft (6,406.3 m^{2})

The Golden Ball Building is a vacant 5-storey commercial building in uptown Saint John, New Brunswick, Canada. Located at the corner of Sydney and Union streets, the building opened in 1931 as K. C. Irving's Golden Ball garage and Ford dealership. It later served as the home office of Irving Oil from the 1950s until 2019.

== History ==
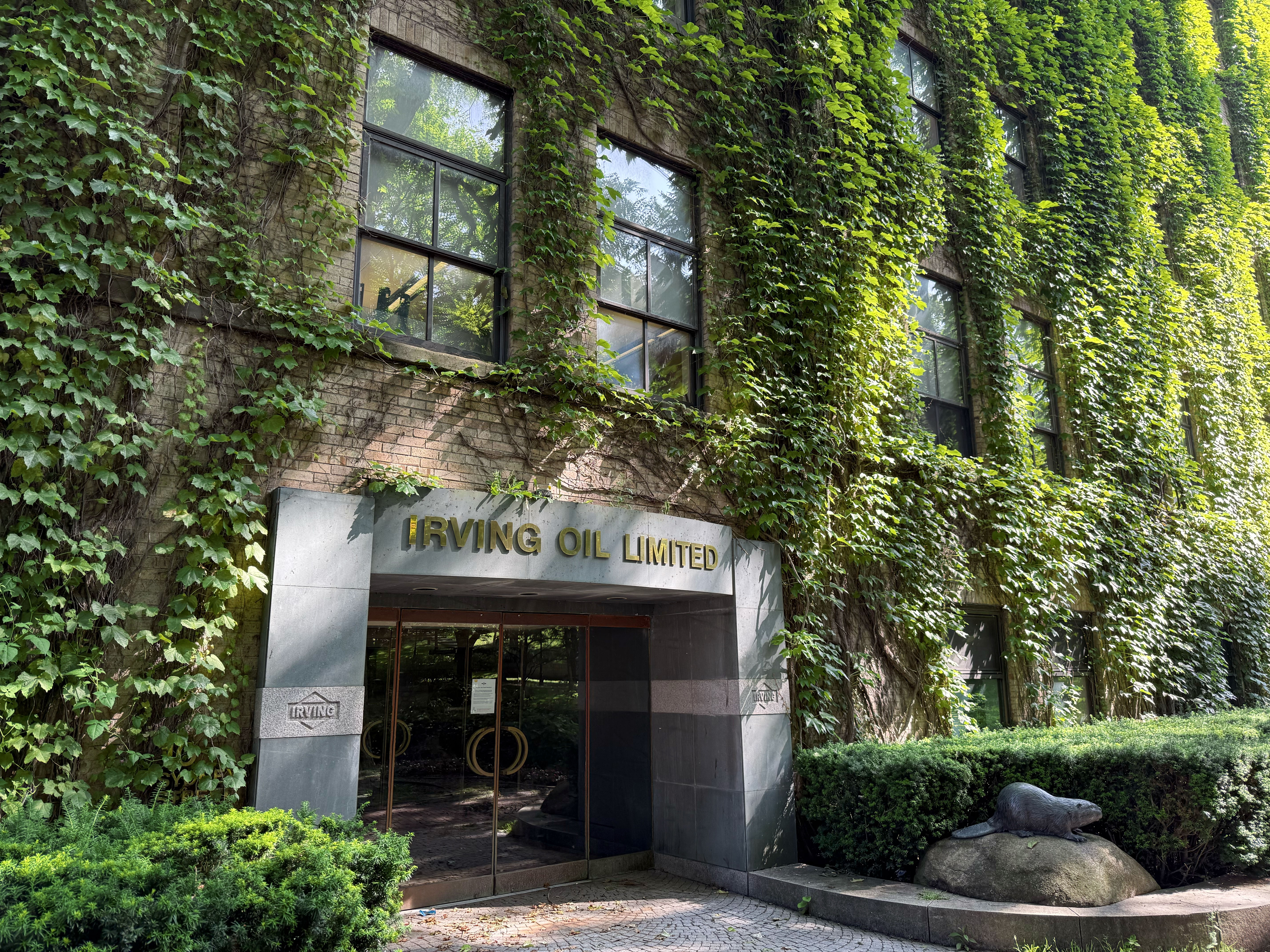
Entrance

The building's name came from an earlier golden ball landmark at the southeast corner of Sydney and Union streets, a site known locally as "Golden Ball Corner" for more than a century.

K.C. Irving moved to Saint John in the late 1920s to take over the city's Ford dealership. In 1931, he opened the Golden Ball garage, which operated for many years as his Ford dealership. By the 1950s, the building had been converted into the home office of Irving Oil, a role it kept until 2019.

=== Sale and planned demolition ===
After Irving Oil left the building in 2019, the property remained vacant. In 2025, J.D. Irving Limited purchased the building and property from Irving Oil as part of long-term planning for its nearby corporate headquarters site. J.D. Irving said the structure had been assessed as no longer suitable for use and would be removed. The company said the site would be maintained as green space while future plans were considered. A demolition permit for the building was approved in 2026.

== See also ==
- Irving Oil
- K. C. Irving
- J.D. Irving Building
