= Brunswick News =

Canadian newspaper publishing company

Coordinates: 46°05′16″N 64°46′55″W

Brunswick News Inc.
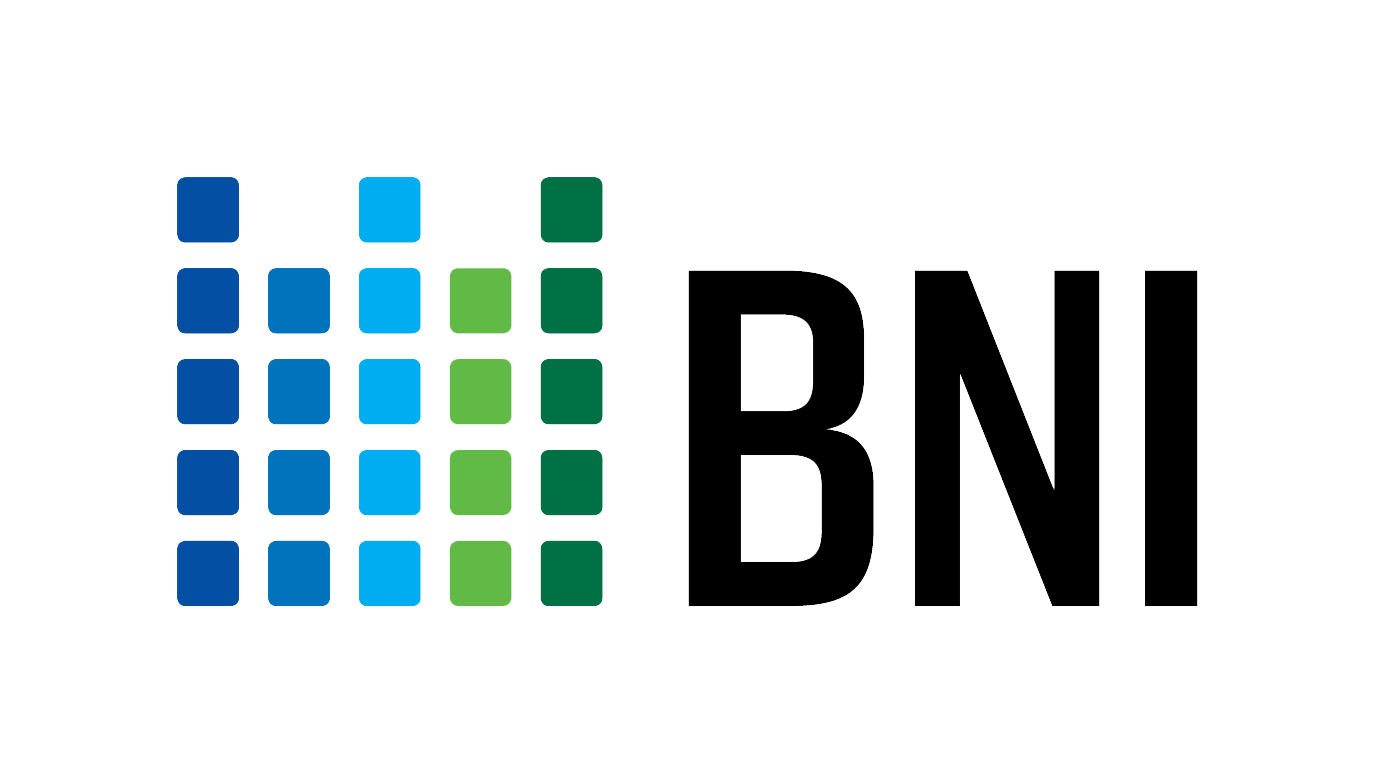
- Industry: Newspaper publishing
- Predecessors: New Brunswick Publishing; Summit Publishing
- Founded: December 1998; 27 years ago
- Founders: Arthur Irving; James K. Irving; John E. Irving
- Defunct: March 25, 2022
- Fate: Acquired by Postmedia Network
- Headquarters: Toronto, Ontario, Canada
- Area served: New Brunswick
- Key people: James K. Irving (CEO); Jamie Irving (Vice-president)

Brunswick News Inc. (BNI) was a Canadian newspaper publishing company based on Bloor Street in Toronto. Once privately owned by James K. Irving and based in Saint John, New Brunswick, it was sold to Postmedia Network in 2022.

BNI was incorporated in December 1998, absorbing Summit Publishing and New Brunswick Publishing Ltd., two newspaper publishing companies already owned by members of New Brunswick's Irving family. The two companies controlled all the daily newspapers in New Brunswick's three major cities. Brunswick News Inc. was created as subsidiary of Otter Brook Holdings, which had been incorporated in 1997.

== Corporate history and ownership ==
=== 1936 to 1968 ===
In 1936 the New Brunswick industrialist K. C. Irving purchased the Saint John weekly Maritime Broadcaster, which he used as the basis to start a daily newspaper, the Citizen. After three years he sold the paper to Howard P. Robinson, the owner of the New Brunswick Publishing Co. Ltd. Robinson closed the Citizen and employed some of its staff on his two Saint John daily papers, the Telegraph-Journal and the Evening Times-Globe. In 1944 Robinson sold his New Brunswick Publishing company to Irving. As well as the two newspapers, Irving acquired a radio station by this purchase. In 1948 Irving bought the two daily newspapers in Moncton, the Times and the Transcript.

In May 1968 Irving bought the Fredericton Daily Gleaner from Michael Wardell. With this purchase Irving became the owner of all five daily newspapers published in New Brunswick. The sale of the Gleaner was not made public by either party, and was only revealed by Senator Charles McElman in a speech on the floor of the Canadian Senate in March 1969.

=== 1969 to 1998 ===
McElman's revelation prompted hearings by the Special Senate Committee on the Mass Media, chaired by Senator Keith Davey. Its mandate was to look at "problems surrounding media concentration, particularly in print media ownership. K. C. Irving testified in December 1969 about his newspaper and other media holdings. At that time he owned 25% of K.C. Irving Ltd., while members of his family owned the remaining 75%. A subsidiary company, New Brunswick Publishing Ltd., owned the two Saint John newspapers, the Telegraph-Journal and the Evening Times Globe. New Brunswick Publishing Ltd. in turn had subsidiaries, one of which was Moncton Publishing, which published the two Moncton papers, the Times and the Transcript. Another subsidiary owned the Saint John radio station CHSJ. K.C. Irving Ltd. had also recently acquired control of the University Press of New Brunswick, which owned Fredericton's Daily Gleaner newspaper.

In 1971 K.C. Irving Ltd. was charged under the Combines Investigation Act because it owned all five of New Brunswick's English language daily newspapers. In R. v. K.C. Irving Ltd., Moncton Publishing Co., New Brunswick Publishing Co. and University Press of New Brunswick Ltd., the four companies were charged with "running a de facto monopoly".

In 1972, before the case went to trial, K.C. Irving moved to Bermuda and the newspaper and radio holdings were divided among his three sons. Jack, the youngest son, became sole owner of the Moncton and Fredericton papers, while James K. and Arthur each acquired 40% of New Brunswick Publishing, which published the two Saint John papers. K.C. Irving Ltd. kept a 20% stake in New Brunswick Publishing.

The trial judge ruled that the Irving family did have too much control of the New Brunswick media, and that the Moncton papers should be sold. He also ordered K.C. Irving Ltd. to pay a fine of $150,000. However, the ruling was overturned, first by the Court of Appeal of New Brunswick and then by the Supreme Court of Canada, on the ground that "public detriment" as a result of the monopoly had not been established "beyond a reasonable doubt".

Brunswick News Inc. was incorporated in December 1998 as a subsidiary of Otter Brook Holdings, which had been incorporated the previous year. Brunswick News absorbed New Brunswick Publishing Ltd., which owned the two Saint John dailies, and Summit Publishing, owner of both the Fredericton and Moncton papers. The two Moncton dailies had merged in 1983 to form the Times & Transcript, so Brunswick News owned a total of four daily newspapers. Brunswick News also owned Acadia Broadcasting, CHSJ's parent company. After restructuring the three Irving brothers held equal shares in the company and Jack Irving's son John was named president of Brunswick News Inc.

=== 21st century ===
In the 21st century Brunswick News expanded by buying weekly and community newspapers in both French and English. By 2004 it owned 12 weeklies, 6 English and 6 French, and had purchased an alternative weekly distributed in Moncton, Fredericton, and Saint John. Meanwhile, the Saint John evening paper, the Times-Globe, had been closed in 2001.

The company was restructured in 2005 with the transfer of Acadia Broadcasting from BNI to Jack Irving and the departure of Jack's son John, who had been BNI's president. He became head of Acadia Broadcasting. Also in 2005, Otter Brook Holdings, BNI's parent company, removed two of the Irving brothers, Jack and Arthur, and their sons, from its list of directors, leaving only James K. and his two sons Jim and Robert as owners of Brunswick News.

Jamie Irving, the son of Jim and grandson of James K., had worked at the Telegraph Journal as a summer student while in university, and studied journalism at Carleton University and the Columbia University Graduate School of Journalism. In 2002 Jamie Irving became publisher of the Kings County Record, a weekly newspaper in which BNI had acquired a minority stake. He was later made responsible for all the weeklies. In November 2004 he was named publisher of the Telegraph Journal. In 2009 he became vice-president of Brunswick News.

In 2017 BNI began delivering packages for Amazon in an expansion of its existing newspaper and flyer delivery network. In January 2022, BNI announced that it would no longer publish Monday editions of its three daily newspapers.

=== Sale to Postmedia ===
On February 17, 2022, Postmedia announced its intent to acquire Brunswick News for $7.5 million in cash and $8.6 million in voting shares of Postmedia stock, valued at $2.10 per-share. BNI's co-CEO Jim Irving stated that the sale marked J. D. Irving's "exit from the media business". The acquisition was completed on March 25, 2022.

On February 7, 2023, in line with similar cuts in other markets, Postmedia announced that the former BNI dailies would further reduce publication to Wednesdays, Thursdays, and Saturdays only beginning March 7, 2023.

== Newspapers ==
Brunswick News employed more than 600 people and operates nearly all of the major print publications in New Brunswick, including three daily newspapers and several French and English language weeklies throughout the province.

Brunswick News operated the following newspapers:

=== Daily ===
- Telegraph-Journal (Saint John; distributed throughout the province)
- Times & Transcript (Moncton)
- The Daily Gleaner (Fredericton)

=== Weekly ===
Brunswick News owns 14 English-language weeklies (6 paid subscription, 5 free) and 7 French-language weeklies (4 paid subscription, 3 free).

- The Tribune (English language) (Campbellton and Restigouche County)
- La Voix du Restigouche (French Language) (Campbellton and Restigouche County)
- The Bugle-Observer (Woodstock)
- Le Journal Madawaska (French Language) (Edmundston)
- L'Étoile (French Language)
  - Édition provinciale
  - Édition La Cataracte (Grand Falls)
  - Édition Chaleur (Chaleur region)
  - Édition Dieppe (Dieppe)
  - Édition Kent (Kent)
  - Édition Péninsule (Acadian Peninsula area)
  - Édition République (Edmundston)
  - Édition Restigouche (Restigouche)
  - Édition Shédiac (Shediac)
- Kings County Record (English language) (Sussex, Kings County area)
- Miramichi Leader (English language) (Miramichi) (Three times a week)
- The Northern Light (English language) (Bathurst)
- Here (English language urban alternative weekly distributed to Saint John, Moncton and Fredericton)
- KV Style (Kennebecasis Valley)

== Criticism ==
Brunswick News faced scrutiny due to its concentration of the print media market in New Brunswick. As part of the Irving Group of Companies, Brunswick News faced accusations that its papers were reluctant to publish stories critical of the Irving Group.

The Irving media concentration in New Brunswick was investigated by the 1969 Special Senate Committee on the Mass Media (the Davey Commission) and the Kent commission (1981) during an era before extensive media concentration took place across Canada in the 1990s; at that time, the Irving concentration in New Brunswick was considered unique in the country's media landscape. The Kent Commission recommended (in section 2.a) the creation of new legislation that would "require the break-up of regional monopolies, such as that of the Irving family in New Brunswick, by prohibiting the ownership of two or more newspapers having 75% or more of the circulation, in one language, in a defined geographical area".

A 2006 Senate report on media ownership in Canada also singled out New Brunswick because of the Irving companies' ownership of all English-language daily newspapers in the province. Senator Joan Fraser, co-author of the Standing Committee on Transport and Communications Final report on the Canadian News Media stated, "We didn't find anywhere else in the developed world a situation like the situation in New Brunswick." The report went further, stating that "the Irvings' corporate interests form an industrial-media complex that dominates the province" to a degree "unique in developed countries." At the Senate hearing, journalists and academics cited Irving newspapers' lack of critical reporting on the family's influential businesses.

In June 2019, BNI ended its freelance contract with political cartoonist Michael de Adder following his publication of a cartoon depicting U.S. president Donald Trump encountering the dead bodies of two migrants on a golf course; de Adder told the CBC that Trump was one of the only "taboo" subjects at BNI. The company claimed that the decision was unrelated to the cartoon, as they had already negotiated to replace de Adder with Greg Perry—who the company described as a "reader favourite"—prior to the publication. Following the statement, Perry also cut his ties with BNI, stating that BNI's promotion of himself as a "reader favourite" had led to further reader backlash against him.

== Support of journalism studies ==
In 2005, with a donation of $2 million, Brunswick News Inc. endowed two chairs of journalism in New Brunswick: the Irving Chair in Journalism at St. Thomas University in Fredericton and the Roméo LeBlanc Chair in Journalism at Université de Moncton. In 2016 the Moncton chair was replaced by the Roméo LeBlanc Scholarship Fund for the Advancement of Excellence in Journalism, which provides $15,000 annually to a journalism student in his or her third and fourth years.
