= Irving Oil =

Canadian oil company

Irving Oil Ltd.
- Type: Private
- Industry: Oil and petroleum
- Founded: Irving filling station: April 1924; 102 years ago Bouctouche, New Brunswick, Canada; Irving Oil Company: February 1929; 97 years ago Saint John, New Brunswick, Canada
- Founder: K. C. Irving
- Headquarters: Irving Oil Home Office; Saint John, New Brunswick, Canada
- Key people: James K. Irving; Arthur Irving; John E. Irving; Jeff Matthews (CEO)
- Products: Fuels, Lubricants, Petrochemicals
- Parent: Irving Group of Companies
- Website: www.irvingoil.com

Irving Oil Ltd. is a Canadian privately owned intergenerational gasoline, oil, and natural gas producing and exporting company, a subsidiary of the parent company Irving Group of Companies, one of the largest "private conglomerates" in North America. Irving Oil was established in 1924 by Canadian oil baron and billionaire, Kenneth "K.C." Irving, whose family fortune when he died in 1992 was estimated by Forbes at USD5 billion. His son, Arthur, became chairman and president of Irving Oil. Arthur Irving died in 2024.

Irving Oil operates Canada's largest refinery, the Irving Oil Refinery, in Saint John, New Brunswick, and Ireland's only refinery, in Whitegate, County Cork, as well as a network of gasoline stations, fleet of oil tankers, real estate and other related assets. Irving Oil's Home Office is located in Uptown Saint John and was officially opened in 2019.

== History ==
=== Origins ===
Original refinery on the east side of Saint John, New Brunswick

In April 1924, Kenneth Colin (K.C.) Irving, a then-25-year-old automobile salesman, started what would later become Irving Oil when he opened his first filling station in his hometown of Bouctouche. On October 13, 1925, Irving took control over the Ford dealership business in Saint John. Most modern sources attribute 1924 as being the year Irving Oil was founded; the first incorporation of a company which eventually led to the establishment of Irving Oil was K. C. Irving, Limited, which took place in late November 1926. Afterwards, the incorporation of K. C. Irving Oil and Gas Company, Limited, which was done under Nova Scotia jurisdiction, took place in May 1928. Irving Oil was then incorporated in February 1929 as Irving Oil Company, Limited, with the newly-formed company being headquartered in Saint John; it acquired the preceding K. C. Irving Oil and Gas Company, Limited, the "gasoline and oil division" of K. C. Irving, Limited, as well as the Bore Motor Fuel Company, a Moncton-based company previously unrelated to Irving which was incorporated on March 20, 1924. By November 1929, the company expanded; throughout the Maritime provinces, Irving Oil Company went from 10 wholesale bulk stations to 30 since its formation earlier that year. The company also went from having 27 retail service stations distributing its products to 450. The following year, the company went forward with developments toward creating an oil plant; the Saint John Harbor Commissioners leased out land for the company to go through with these developments. In August 1931, an unconfirmed report claimed that the company was acquired by Imperial Oil; by the end of that year, Irving Oil had grown to become one of the largest gasoline distributors in the Maritimes.

The company expanded across the Maritimes through the 1930s, to Quebec in 1940, Newfoundland in 1949, and to Maine in 1972.

=== Environmental initiatives ===
In 1977, Irving Oil became the first Canadian oil company to offer unleaded gasoline at its retail outlets. In the late 1990s it became the first oil company in Canada and one of the first in North America to offer gasoline with very low sulphur content, a fact which was recognized by many automobile manufacturers.

Due to its investment in reducing emissions, Irving Oil was one of the few energy companies in Canada to publicly support the Kyoto Accord.

The resignation of president Ian Whitcomb, in February 2024, amid ongoing leadership changes and a strategic review, suggests potential significant shifts in the future direction of the company.

== Operations ==
=== Refining ===
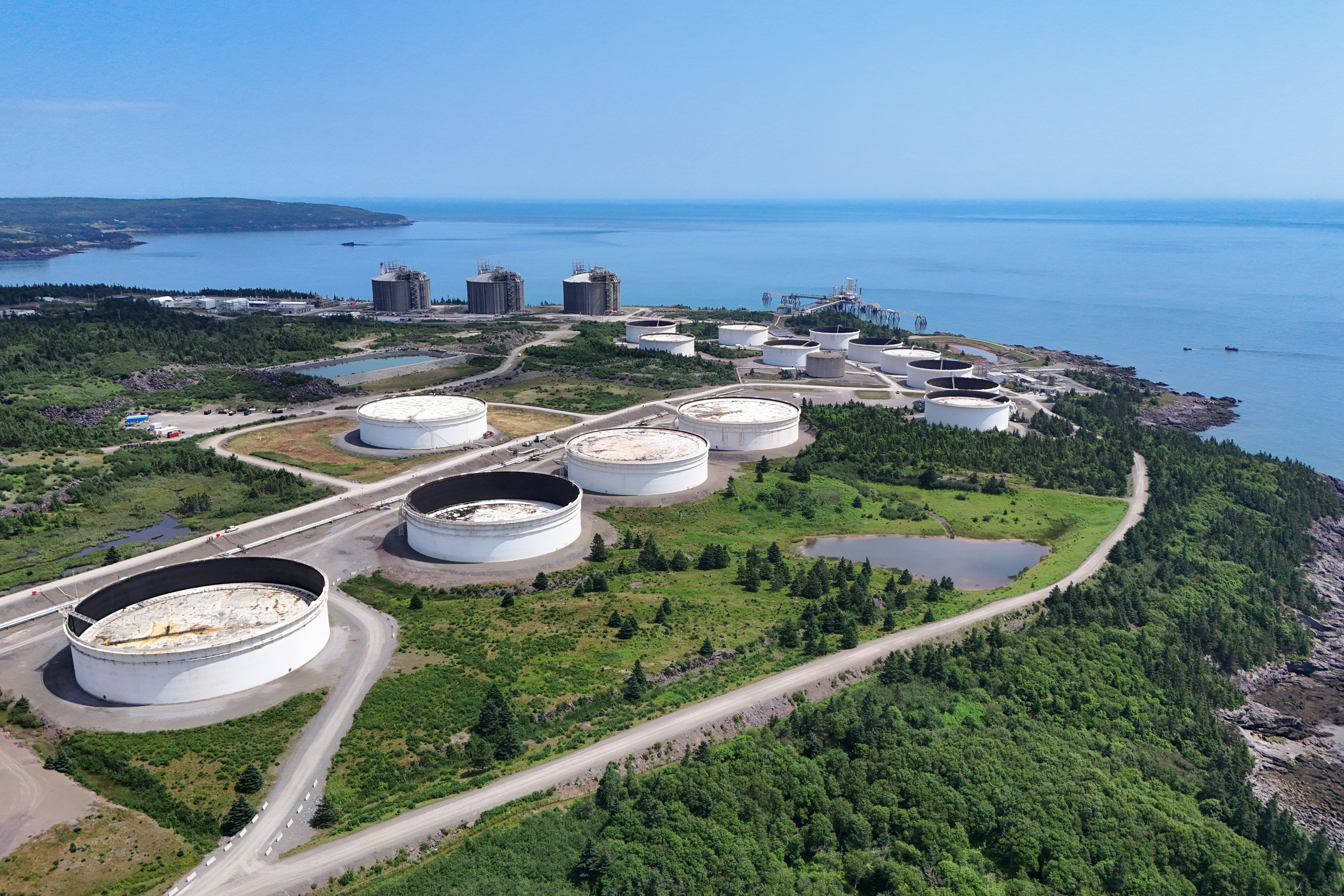
Irving Canaport terminal

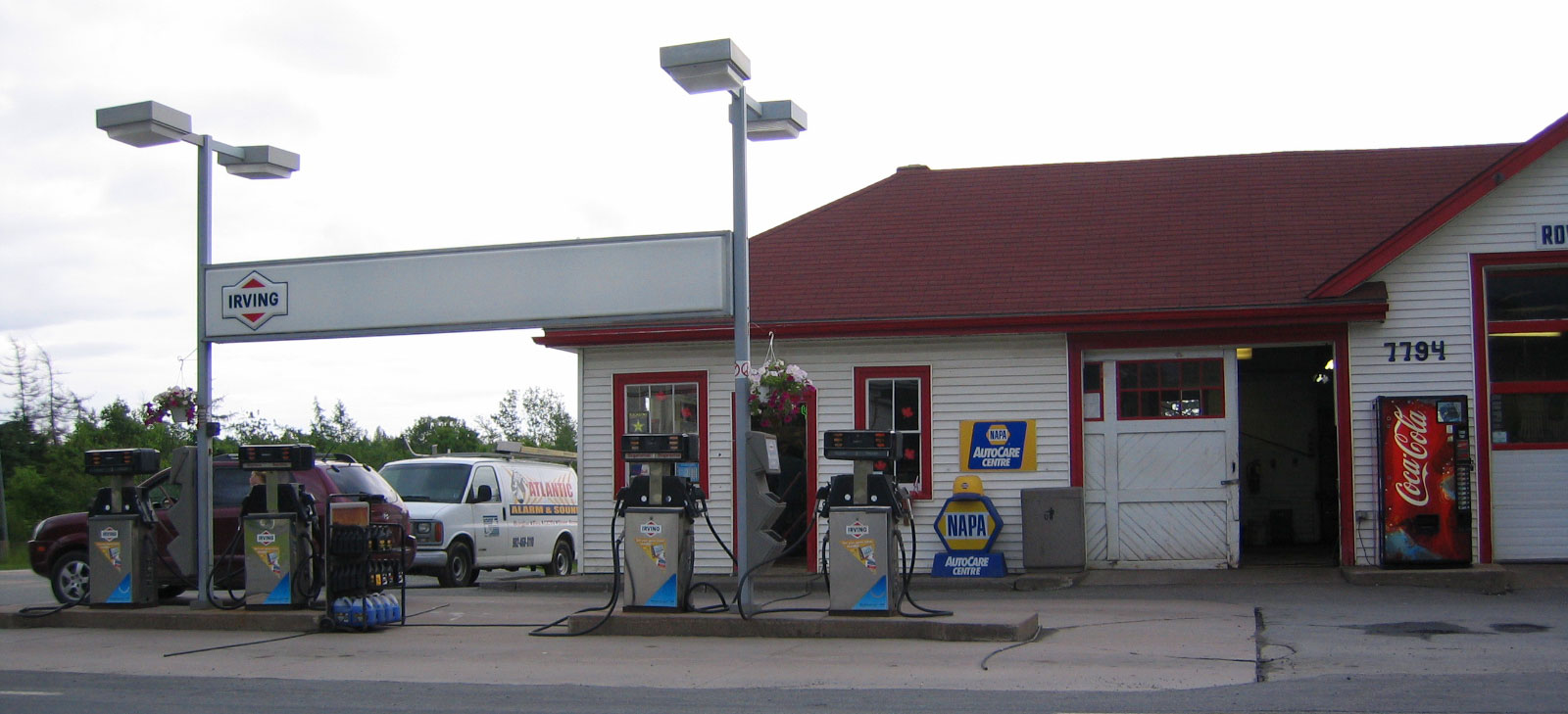
Old style Irving Oil station, in Musquodoboit Harbour, Nova Scotia

In 1960, the company partnered with Standard Oil Co. of California (SOCAL) to build the Irving Oil Refinery on the east side of Saint John. Irving bought out SOCAL's share of the refinery in the late 1980s and expanded the facility to become Canada's largest refinery, processing over 300,000 barrels per day (48,000 m^{3}/d). In the late 1990s, the refinery was upgraded to create some of North America's lowest-emission petroleum.

Since 1970, the refinery has been served by the Canaport crude oil receiving terminal southeast of Saint John. In 2009, this facility was expanded to host the Canaport LNG terminal for importing liquefied natural gas (LNG).

Irving Oil announced in fall 2006 that it had purchased more land near Canaport and was examining the feasibility of constructing another 300,000-barrel (48,000 m^{3}) refinery in the area to complement the original modernized 1960s-era refinery in the east end of Saint John; the new refinery was to be named the "Eider Rock Refinery" and was to be built under a partnership between Irving Oil and BP plc. On July 24, 2009 both companies announced that they were indefinitely postponing plans to build the second refinery.

=== Distribution ===
==== Marine ====
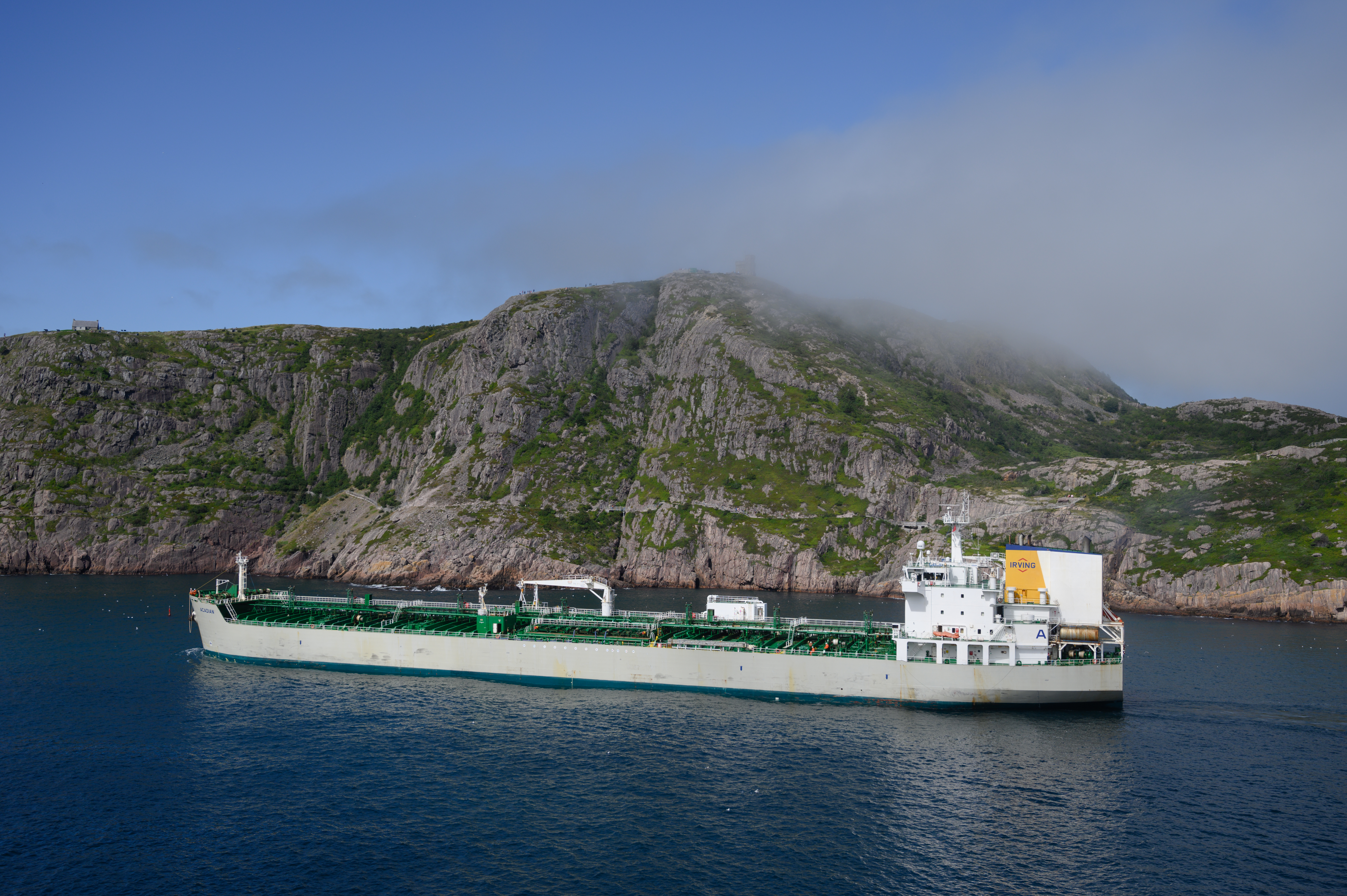
Petro products tanker, Acadian, coming into the Irving Dock at St. John's Harbor, Newfoundland.

Irving Oil's core retail area is in northeast North America and is well served by a network of regional ports and harbours in Atlantic Canada, Quebec and New England - an area that is under-served by pipelines. Consequently, the company economically transports much of its petroleum products to regional distribution terminals at ports throughout the region using its own fleet of coastal tankers.

The Irving Whale, an oil barge owned by Irving Oil's sister firm J.D. Irving Ltd., was carrying a cargo of 4300 tons of No. 6 fuel oil for Irving Oil when it sank in the Gulf of St. Lawrence on September 7, 1970, causing a large initial oil spill and subsequent leaks for the next 26 years until it was salvaged by the federal government on July 30, 1996.

In the 1990s, Irving Oil also took delivery of several Ultra Large Crude Carriers to deliver crude oil to the Saint John refinery from production locations in Venezuela, the Persian Gulf and the North Sea.

==== Road ====
Irving Oil operates a large fleet of company-branded tanker trucks to deliver petroleum to retail locations from its Saint John refinery as well as the marine distribution terminals. Since the 1970s these semi-trailer tanker trucks were painted a distinctive golden yellow but the fleet underwent a paint scheme change in the 2000s to use white for both cab and trailer. Irving Oil's home heating fuel delivery truck fleet was similarly coloured and is undergoing a paint scheme change.

Sister company J.D. Irving Limited owns and operates RST Industries which provides road tanker transport services for Irving Oil's wholesale deliveries, as well as for jet fuel, marine fuel, liquid asphalt, and other products.

==== Rail ====
Irving Oil once made extensive use of rail service to deliver petroleum from the Saint John refinery to rail-side distribution terminals throughout Atlantic Canada and Quebec. The decline in rural branch rail lines operated by Canadian National Railway and CP Rail in the 1980s and 1990s, combined with the increase of 4-lane highway construction, has seen Irving Oil eliminate practically all retail petroleum delivery by rail and the closure of many of its rail-side distribution terminals in favour of newer highway-served terminals or direct deliveries.

Irving Oil continues to make extensive use of rail service for wholesale petroleum deliveries from its Saint John refinery. Products such as propane, liquid asphalt and diesel are delivered daily to locations in Quebec and New England via New Brunswick Southern Railway, owned by sister company J.D. Irving Limited as well as by CN.

=== Retail network ===
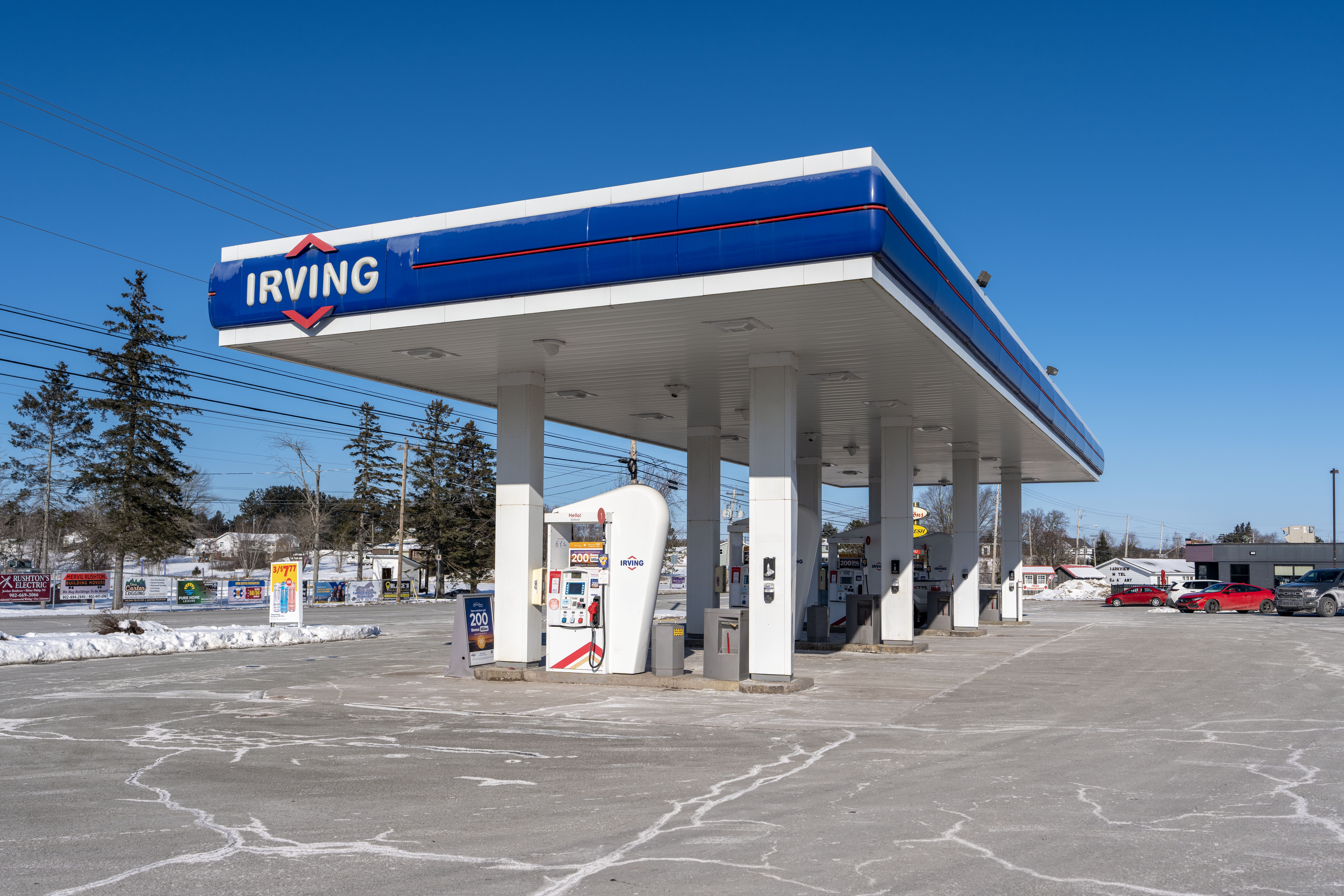
Irving gas station in Oxford, Nova Scotia

Irving Oil operates bulk furnace oil and propane outlets in most major centres across Atlantic Canada, New England and Quebec as well as select locations in eastern Ontario, almost all of which are supplied from its Saint John refinery.

Irving Oil also operates over 900 gas stations in these jurisdictions. In recent decades, smaller stations have been closed and consolidated as newer, larger facilities are constructed - Irving owns many choice real estate locations in communities across northeastern North America, some of which are no longer used for gas retailing, and others being held in speculation of some future need. Older stations are typically franchise operations and still have automobile service and repair shops, which in recent years are branded by Meineke.

==== Convenience stores ====
Most of Irving Oil's corporate owned-and-operated stations also contain convenience stores. These locations operated as simply "Irving" stations until the late 1990s, when the "Mainway" banner ("Marché Mainway" in Quebec) was introduced; "Mainway" being a brand appropriated from one of Irving's U.S. acquisitions. By the early 2000s, 56 of the company's Quebec locations had been leased to the Couche-Tard chain and rebranded accordingly, conversely 60 of Couche-Tard's fueling stations were supplied by Irving fuels and re-branded accordingly. By the mid 2000s, Irving began to renovate and rebrand its old "Mainway" stations under the name "Bluecanoe" as part of the company's modernization plan. The Bluecanoe brand was first introduced in New England and was introduced to some stations in eastern Ontario and the Atlantic provinces; however, many others were not upgraded and retained the older name "Mainway".

On May 8, 2008, Irving announced that they would lease 252 of its gas stations in Atlantic Canada and New England to Couche-Tard for 20 years. Their gas remain supplied by Irving, but their convenience stores were converted to Circle K. In 2018, following Couche-Tard's acquisition of CST Brands (which saw most of its Canadian assets sold to Parkland Fuel), 36 Ultramar gas stations in Atlantic Canada were converted to Irving/Circle K locations. Of them, 13 were in turn sold to Irving Oil and leased by Couche-Tard.

==== Big Stops ====
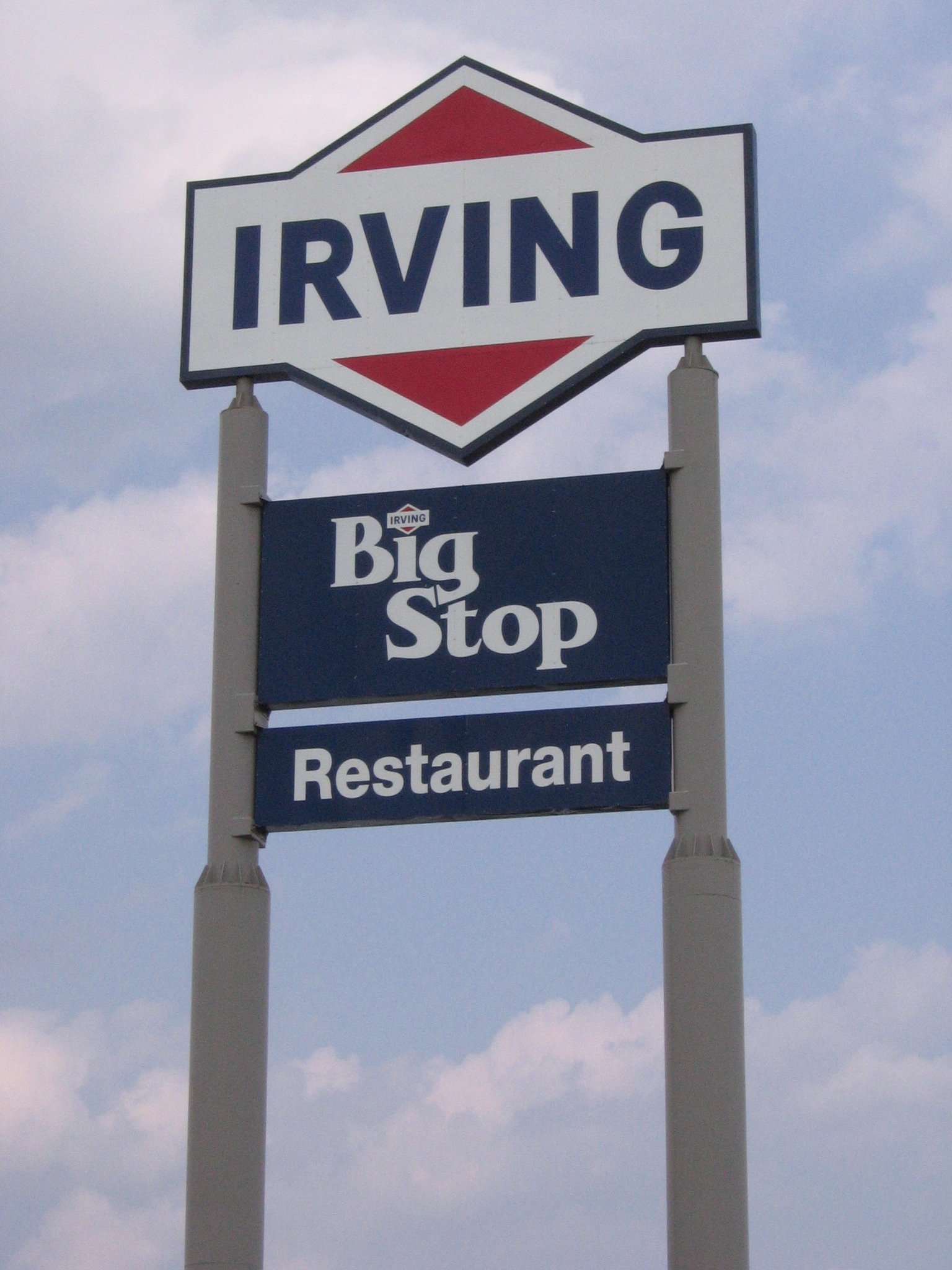
Irving "Big Stop" truck stop sign near Fredericton, New Brunswick

Irving Oil also operates several "Big Stops", which are truck stops featuring family restaurants, facilities for truck drivers, and convenience stores. These large stations are located at strategic locations throughout New England, the Maritimes, Quebec and Newfoundland.

They occupy several hectares near important highway interchanges and junctions and have been developed since the 1970s; some of the oldest Big Stops are still in operation with the interiors being evocative of that era. These locations, aside from their convenience store operations, continue to be operated by Irving Oil.

In the past decade, Irving Oil has opened several new Big Stops in New Brunswick to reflect the modernized and realigned arterial highway network in that province, and these facilities contain restaurants that have their own name and identity which are often reflective of the local area. The first modern Big Stop is in Salisbury, NB, and its restaurant is called "The Silver Fox"; the second one to open was in Lincoln, NB and has a restaurant called "The Blue Canoe"; the third was in Grand Falls, NB with a restaurant called "The Back Forty"; the most recent is in Enfield, NS with a restaurant called "Crossing" - the original name for the community.

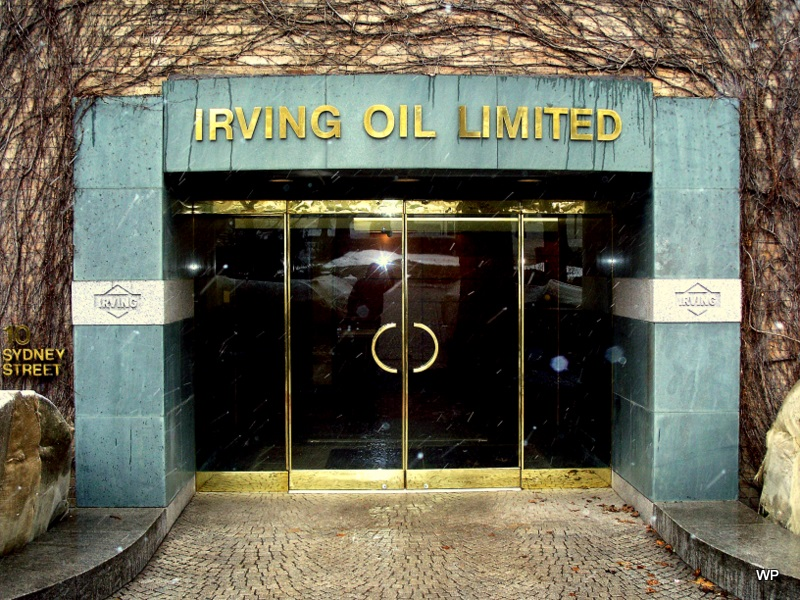
Irving corporate offices in Saint John

== Criticisms ==
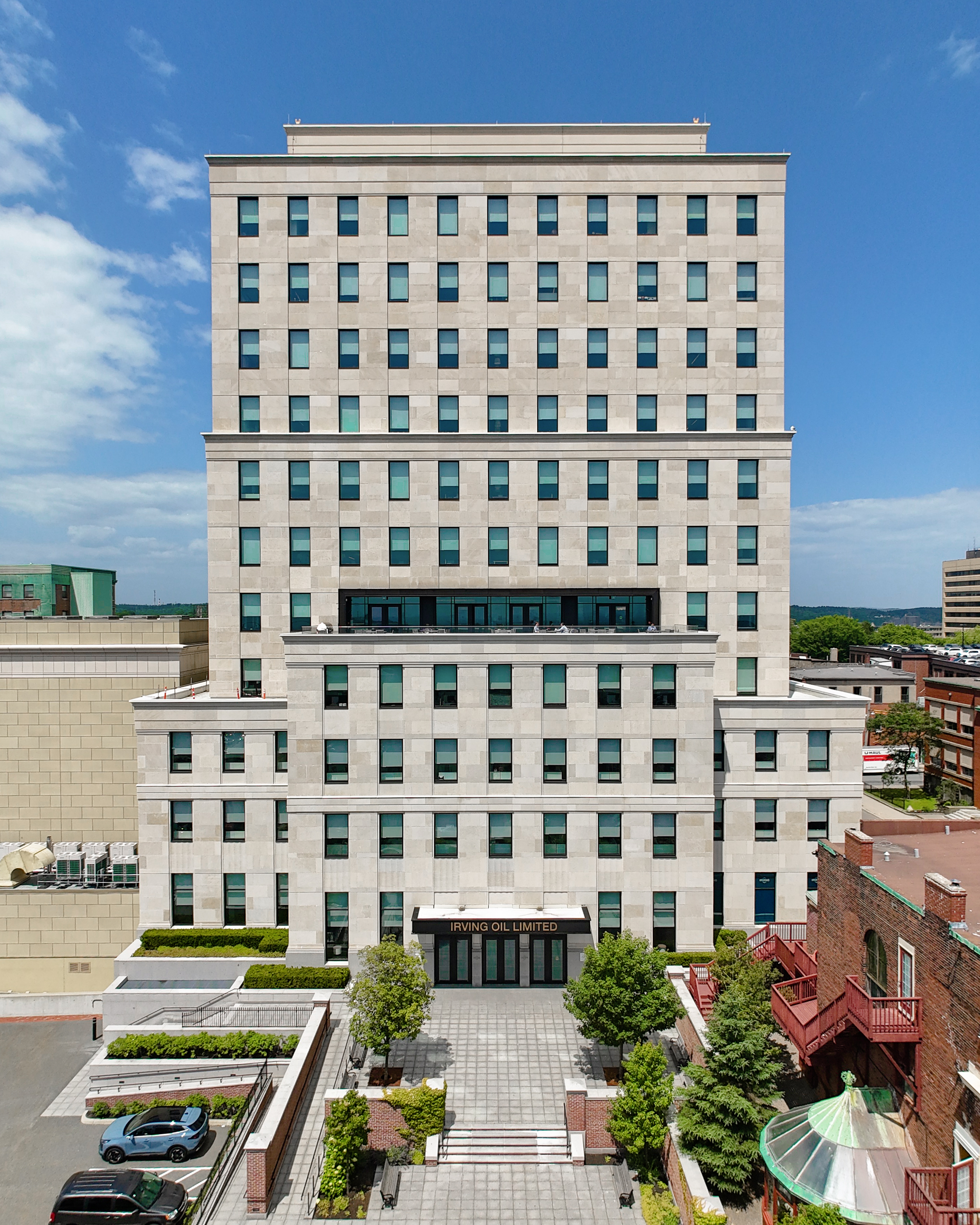
Irving Oil Home Office

Examples of vertical integration within the "Irving Group of Companies" (as the Irving family refers to their holdings) include the acquisition or formation of businesses along the entire chain of production, from the Irving refinery (an Irving Oil subsidiary) and its retail outlets, to the transportation subsidiaries of J.D. Irving (RST, Midland, NB Southern, Sunbury), to various construction and engineering companies that assist in building, maintaining and expanding the conglomerate's facilities. Further examples of vertical integration within the conglomerate include Industrial Security Ltd. (ISL), the wholly owned security company that guards facilities, as well as industrial suppliers such as Thornes, Universal Sales and Commercial Equipment Ltd. which provide specialty goods and services to its companies. J.D. Irving, the sister firm to Irving Oil, is a dominant forestry company in northeastern North America, growing trees, harvesting trees and producing lumber, pulp and paper, and various enhanced value products such as magazine grade paper, tissue, and personal care products. James Irving also owns Brunswick News which controls most English-language newspapers in New Brunswick.

The City of Saint John, where Irving Oil is located, is closely tied to the Irving Group of Companies, which are mostly headquartered there. In 2000, New Brunswick New Democratic Party leader Elizabeth Weir released documents accessed under the Right to Information Act surrounding $1 billion upgrades being put in motion for the oil refinery by the government without being completely assessed for its environmental impact, suggesting that the government "ignored the public interest and pandered to big business."

The July 2013 Lac-Mégantic, Quebec rail tanker explosion increased awareness in Saint John of potential rail safety issues involving Irving Oil crude shipments, since the train that exploded was on its way to the Irving Oil refinery there. Irving Oil's siting of a crude oil rail terminal in an east neighbourhood of the city drew heavy criticism from environmentalists and residents. Irving Oil was allowed to establish the terminal without environmental assessments. The facility has since faced complaints regarding air quality and noise.

There was also conflict in Saint John over the proposed construction of a natural gas pipeline that was to cross through a major municipal park. However, it is unknown if there would be any health risks to the community.

The Dominion newspaper, an independent Canadian newspaper, has criticized Irving's ownership of Brunswick News, as well as the newspapers' journalistic integrity, particularly when reporting on companies controlled by the Irving family such as Irving Oil. Even the Canadian Senate has examined the issue; a report from the Senate in 2006 on media control in Canada singled out New Brunswick because of the Irving companies' ownership of all English-language daily newspapers in the province, including the Telegraph-Journal. Senator Joan Fraser, author of the Senate report, stated, "We didn't find anywhere else in the developed world a situation like the situation in New Brunswick." The report went further, stating, "the Irvings' corporate interests form an industrial-media complex that dominates the province" to a degree "unique in developed countries." At the Senate hearing, journalists and academics cited Irving newspapers' lack of critical reporting on the family's influential businesses.

There have also been accusations of Irving family political patronage, notably involving Allan Rock and Claudette Bradshaw of the Liberal Party of Canada.

=== Irving Oil and taxes ===
In 1987, Irving Oil sued the federal government for $141 million, citing the amount as being "taxes and interest" which were "wrongly assessed against the company from 1971 to 1975." In response, the government alleged that Irving Oil used a "sham" price system to "hide swollen profits from Revenue Canada, which has disallowed the company's claimed costs."

==== Tax breaks and concessions ====
In 1981, the provincial government, then-led by Richard Hatfield, granted a tax exemption towards provincial property taxes for Irving Oil's Canaport crude oil farm. Hatfield, who, according to CBC News, "was on record opposing special tax treatment for Irving Oil's Canaport oil terminal," granted the exemption following the 1979 oil crisis. Despite the issues caused by the crisis having long been resolved, the tax exemption has never been removed, saving Irving Oil from having to pay for over $20 million in property taxes since its introduction. Blaine Higgs, the then Premier and leader of the Progressive Conservative Party, stated during a 2016 CBC interview with Harry Forestell that he would "support ending a provincial property-tax exemption on Irving Oil's Canaport oil terminal, if a review showed it was no longer needed," though progress regarding the matter has yet to have been made, despite calls for the removal of the exemption, including by provincial Green Party leader David Coon, whose campaign for the 2018 election included the removal of the exemption. In March 2023, Service New Brunswick accidentally reverted the exemption and charged Irving Oil about $580,000 in Canaport property taxes, in what was described as an "inadvertent internal computer incident." The charge was later reverted and the exemption was reinstated.

In March 2005, Irving Oil received a controversial municipal tax concessions for the Canaport site which were initially passed by the Saint John City Council and subsequently the Progressive Conservative government led by Bernard Lord. The concessions, which reduced Irving Oil's municipal property taxes from $8 million down to being capped at $500,000 until 2030, were initiated in order to develop the Canaport LNG (liquid natural gas) terminal; it was apparently negotiated one-on-one with the city's then-mayor Norm McFarlane. The concessions have cost the City of Saint John approximately $75 million over ten years, with a potential total loss of over $180 million. The tax break was cancelled in December, 2016 at the request of Saint John city council, with unanimous support in the Legislative Assembly. In 2015, the Telegraph-Journal, a daily newspaper then-owned by Irving, published an editorial arguing against reconsideration of the tax concessions granted to Irving Oil, without acknowledging the conflict of interest. In 2016, coverage of Saint John Common Council advocacy for higher taxation of Irving Oil's refinery was notably absent from the newspaper, despite extensive coverage in CBC and other news outlets.

In 2022, it was revealed through leaked financial documents that during 2005, the same year that they had persuaded municipal and provincial governments in what ultimately granted them the tax concessions, Irving Oil made $250.7 million in profits. The corporation even profited $111.2 million during the 2008 financial crisis, which severely dropped oil prices.

== See also ==
- Kenneth Colin Irving
- J.D. Irving Limited
