= John E. Irving =

Canadian businessman (1932–2010)

John E. Irving CM
- Born: John Ernest Irving; January 1, 1932; New Brunswick, Canada
- Died: July 21, 2010 (aged 78); Saint John, New Brunswick, Canada
- Occupation: Businessman
- Relatives: Irving family

John Ernest Irving CM (January 1, 1932 – July 21, 2010) was a Canadian businessman, the youngest son of the industrialist K. C. Irving (of the Irving family) and his wife, Harriet Lila Irving (née MacNarin).

Born in New Brunswick, Jack Irving, as he was called, along with his brothers J.K. and Arthur and their three families, share the ownership and operating responsibility for what is known informally as the Irving Group of Companies.

Following their father's death in 1992, ownership and responsibility for the Irving companies was divided as follows:

- James K. Irving (J.K.) – Ownership of and responsibility for Brunswick News and J.D. Irving, Limited a conglomerate which has interests in several industries including forestry, pulp and paper, tissue, Super-calendered paper, building supplies, frozen food, transportation, shipping lines, and shipbuilding.
- Arthur Irving – Ownership of and responsibility for Irving Oil, its retail stores, oil refineries, oil tankers and distribution terminals and other facilities.
- John E. Irving (Jack) – Ownership of and responsibility for construction, engineering, and concrete and steel fabrication companies as well as Commercial Properties, Source Atlantic and Acadia Broadcasting, Limited.

All companies within the Irving conglomerate, including Irving Oil and J.D. Irving, Limited are vertically integrated and buy services and products from other companies within the conglomerate, thereby maintaining profits within their operations.

Irving gained a reputation as being the most reflective of the Irving family, and was known for being far less aggressive than his older brothers when it came to business, choosing instead to listen intently and leave the talking mostly to them. Many credit this to a kidnapping incident in 1982. Though he was found unharmed, the kidnapping left him aware of his own mortality and a shift in his personality was noted.

An avid conservationist of ecological and cultural areas, Jack Irving was a strong supporter of the arts in Atlantic Canada.

Irving died at the age of 78 on July 21, 2010, following a brief illness. His family include his wife, Suzanne Cameron (deceased 2025); two sons, John K. F. Irving and Colin D. Irving (deceased 2019); and a daughter, Anne Cameron Irving, Mrs. Oxley. John K. F. Irving succeeded him in his business interests.

== See also ==
- List of kidnappings
- K.C. Irving for an overview and history of the development of the Irving Group of Companies.
