= Kings County Record =

Canadian newspaper in New Brunswick

The Kings County Record

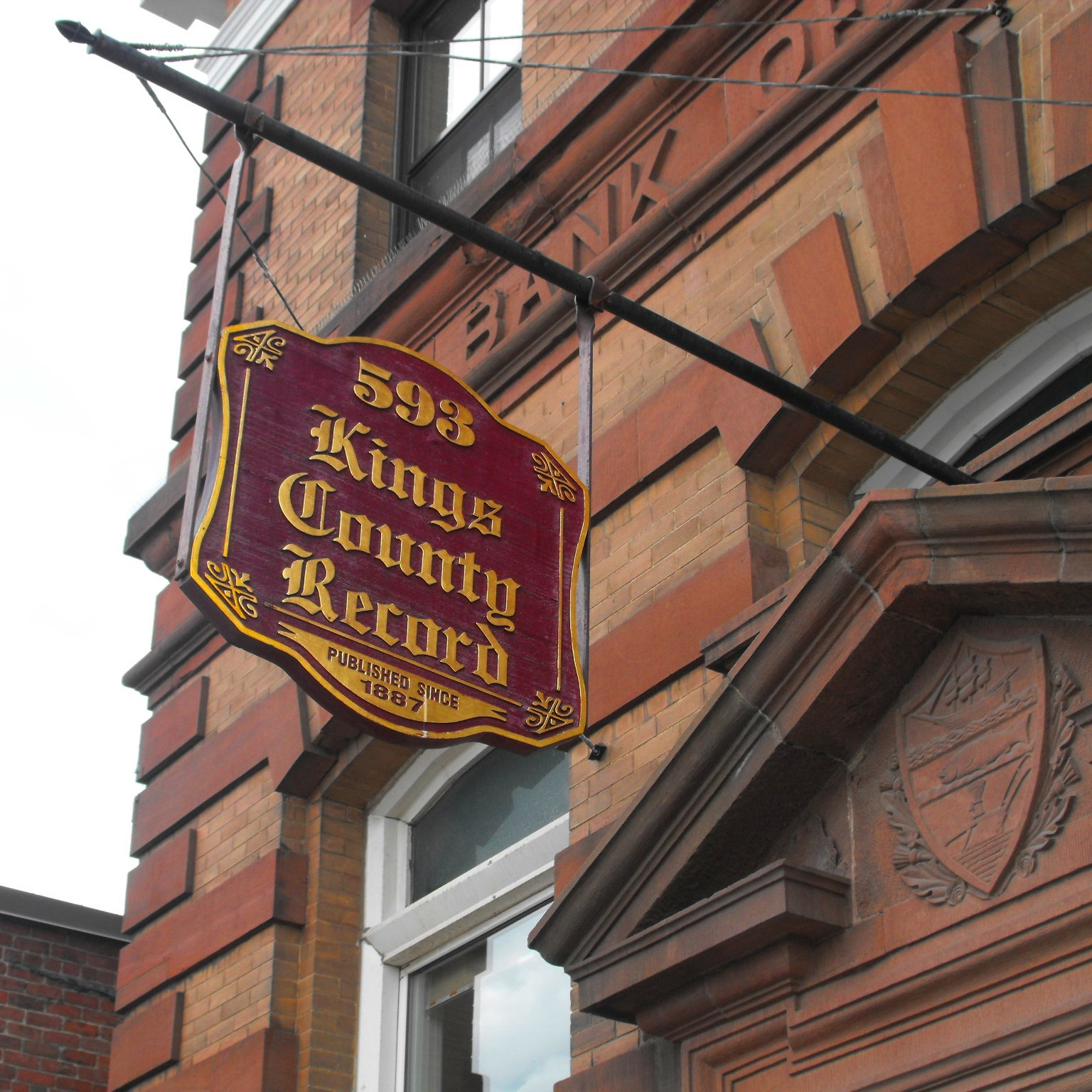
- Kings County Record, Sussex, New Brunswick
- Type: Weekly newspaper
- Format: Broadsheet
- Owner: Postmedia Network
- Editor: David Kelly - Editor
- Staff writers: Shannon A. MacLeod; Terrence McEachern; Jeanne Whitehead
- Founded: 1887
- Language: English
- Headquarters: Sussex, New Brunswick
- Circulation: 5,212
- Website: Kings County Record

The Kings County Record is a weekly newspaper serving Sussex, New Brunswick and the surrounding area. It began publication in 1887. It is the paper of record in Kings County, New Brunswick and is published on Tuesdays.

== See also ==
- List of newspapers in Canada
