= J.D. Irving =

Canadian privately-owned multigenerational conglomerate

J.D. Irving, Limited
- Type: Private
- Industry: Forestry; Transportation; Shipbuilding; Consumer Products
- Founded: 1882; 144 years ago, in Bouctouche, New Brunswick, Canada
- Founder: James Dergavel Irving
- Headquarters: Saint John, New Brunswick, Canada
- Area served: Worldwide with operations throughout North America.
- Key people: Jim Irving (CEO)
- Owner: Unknown
- Number of employees: 20,000
- Parent: Irving Group of Companies
- Divisions: Irving Forest Products & Services; Irving Transportation Services; Irving Shipbuilding & Industrial Fabrication; Irving Retail & Distribution Services; Irving Consumer Products; Irving Industrial Equipment & Construction; Irving Specialty Printing; Irving Tissue
- Website: www.jdirving.com

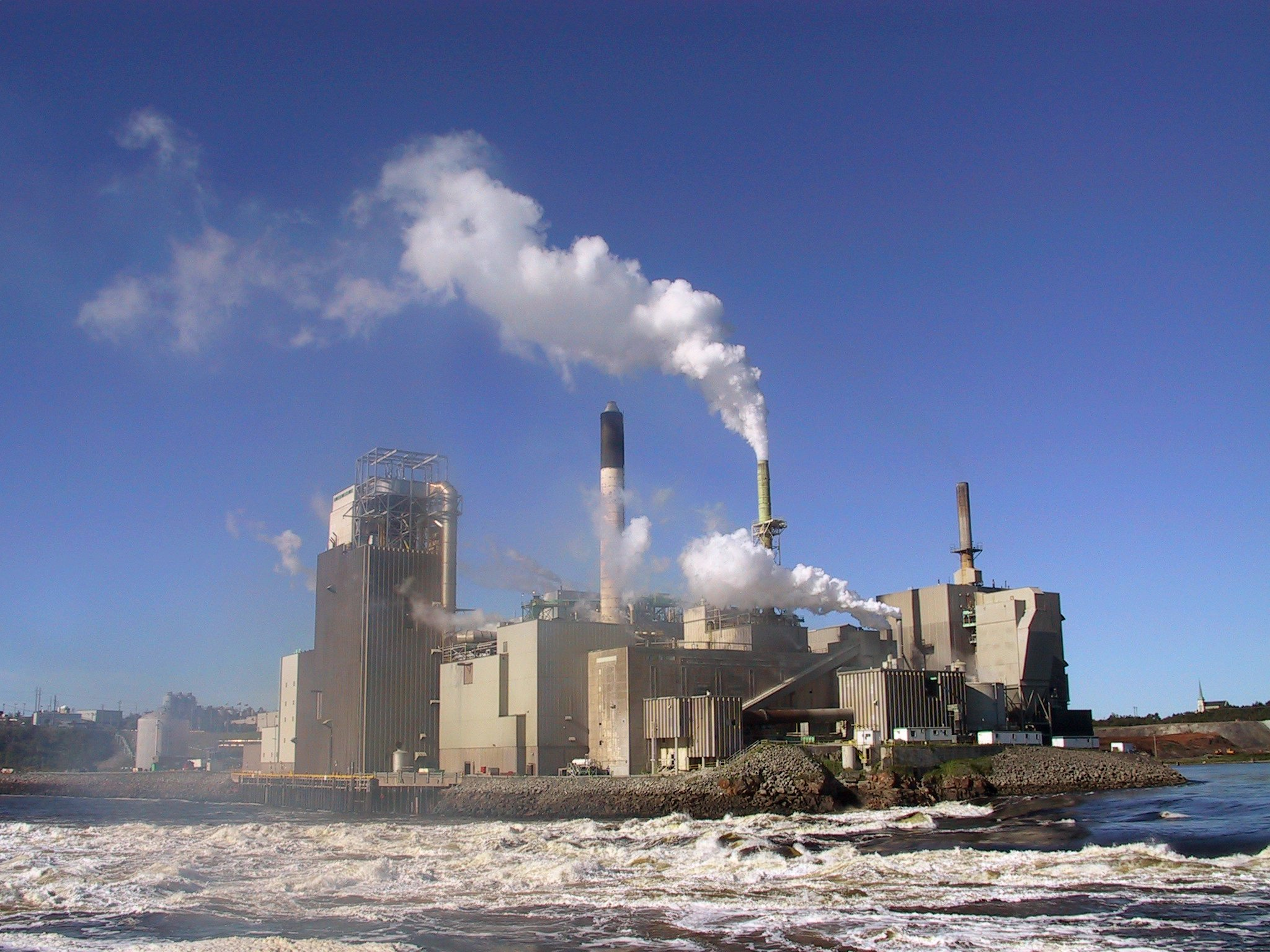
Pulp and Paper Mill owned by JDI in Saint John, New Brunswick.

J.D. Irving, Limited (JDI) is a privately owned conglomerate company headquartered in Saint John, New Brunswick, Canada. It is a part of the Irving Group of Companies and consists of various subsidiaries, including Irving Tissue, Irving Equipment, Kent Building Supplies, New Brunswick Railway, New Brunswick Southern Railway, Eastern Maine Railway, Maine Northern Railway, Acadia Broadcasting, Irving Shipbuilding, and Cavendish Farms, among others. JDI operates across a range of industries, including forestry, forestry products, agriculture, food processing, transportation, and shipbuilding. Together with Irving Oil and Ocean Capital Investments, JDI constitutes the core of the Irving Group of Companies, which consolidates the business interests of the Irving family.

== History ==
J.D. Irving, Limited traces its origins to a sawmill operated in Bouctouche, New Brunswick, by its namesake, James Dergavel Irving. Ownership of J.D. Irving's operations passed to his children, one of whom—Kenneth Colin Irving—assumed majority control and used JDI to expand into pulp and paper and other forestry-related businesses between the 1920s and 1940s.

In the post-war years, JDI acquired pulp mills in Saint John and upstate New York, as well as sawmills throughout New Brunswick. During the 1950s, JDI took control of a shipyard in Saint John and established several trucking and heavy industry companies, such as Irving Equipment, to meet the growing needs of its operations.

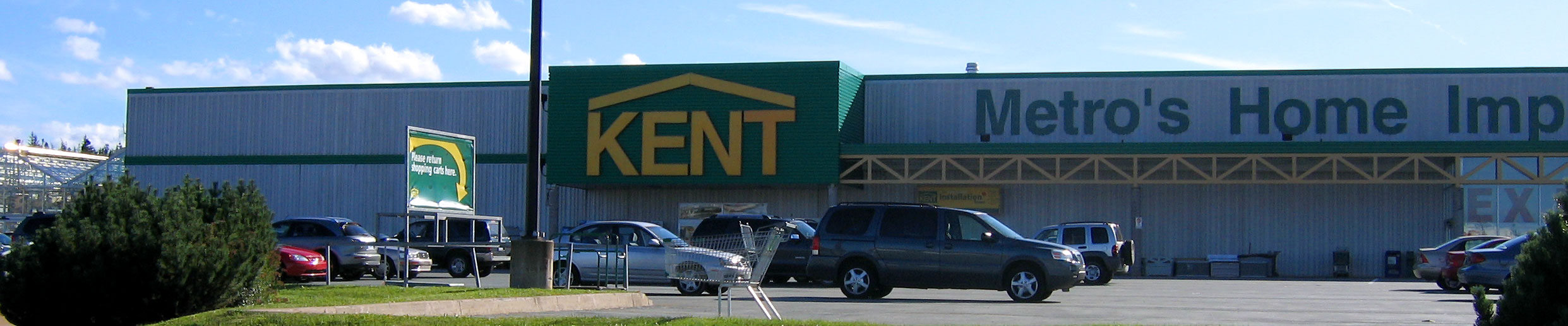
A Kent store in Halifax, Nova Scotia.

In the 1970s and 1980s, JDI expanded into trucking through its subsidiary, Scot Truck, based in Debert, Nova Scotia. Now known as Midland Transport and headquartered in Dieppe, New Brunswick, it is joined by sister companies Midland Courier (Dieppe), Sunbury Transport (Fredericton) and RST Industries (Saint John).

JDI is also a shipbuilder in Canada, owning shipyards in Halifax, Liverpool, and Shelburne, Nova Scotia, as well as in Georgetown, Prince Edward Island.

== Incidents ==
As a major regional industrial conglomerate, subsidiaries of JDI have been involved in several notable incidents:

- In 1970, an oil barge named Irving Whale sank in the Gulf of St. Lawrence, causing periodic oil spills until it was raised by the federal government in 1996.
- In 2007, the Irving Pulp & Paper Ltd. mill at Reversing Falls accidentally released 680,000 litres of green liquor into the Saint John River. The company pleaded guilty and was fined $50,000. In November 2008, Environment Canada investigators exercised a search warrant at Irving Pulp & Paper's head office to gather further information about the spill.
- In November 2008, JDI Logistics and Atlantic Towing made headlines following an accident involving the transport of two new turbines from Saint John Harbour to the nearby Point Lepreau Nuclear Generating Station. The subsidiaries had been subcontracted by Siemens AG—the turbine replacement subcontractor for NB Power, the facility's owner. The turbines, manufactured in Scotland, were shipped to Saint John aboard a cargo vessel on a road transport vehicle. During offloading onto a barge owned by Atlantic Towing Ltd., the cargo shifted, causing the barge to capsize and sending both the turbines and the transport vehicle into Saint John Harbour.
- Later that month, the Atlantic Towing Ltd. dredging barge Shovel Master was being towed by the company's tugboat Atlantic Larch from Saint John to Halifax for a refit when it foundered in heavy seas 20 nmi (37 km) west of Yarmouth, Nova Scotia. The three crew members were rescued by a CH-149 Cormorant search-and-rescue helicopter before the barge capsized. Several Atlantic Towing tugboats and commercial divers responded; the tug Atlantic Oak secured a tow line to the capsized (but still floating) barge. The barge was towed 45 nmi (83 km) south of Yarmouth but ultimately sank in 150 m (490 ft) of water, carrying 70,000 L (18,000 US gal) of diesel fuel, 1,000 L (260 US gal) of hydraulic fluid, and 5,000 L (1,300 US gal) of waste oil.

== Controversies ==
JDI’s ownership of most major media outlets in New Brunswick has sparked ongoing concerns about media concentration. A 2006 Canadian Senate report on media ownership singled out New Brunswick due to Irving's control of all English-language daily newspapers in the province, including the Telegraph-Journal. Senator Joan Fraser, the report's author, stated: "We didn't find anywhere else in the developed world a situation like the situation in New Brunswick." The report further noted that "the Irvings' corporate interests form an industrial-media complex that dominates the province" to a degree "unique in developed countries." During Senate hearings, journalists and academics cited a lack of critical reporting on the Irving family's businesses in Irving-owned newspapers.

=== Censorship concerns ===
JDI has repeatedly criticized CBC News and its New Brunswick provincial affairs reporter, Jacques Poitras. In 2014, Poitras published Irving vs. Irving: Canada's Feuding Billionaires and the Stories They Won't Tell, which Bruce Livesey of Canada's National Observer described as detailing "the recent history of the Irvings' media holdings, as well as the deteriorating relationship among the Irving brothers and cousins as they squabble over the empire's wealth and future direction."

On December 2, 2015, Poitras reported on Eilish Cleary's sudden leave as New Brunswick's Chief Medical Officer of Health, noting her concurrent research into glyphosate—a herbicide classified as "probably carcinogenic to humans" by the World Health Organization's International Agency for Research on Cancer. The article briefly mentioned glyphosate's use by JDI and NB Power. Two days later, JDI spokesperson Mary Keith released a "sharply worded" statement condemning the report as a "sensational story" that presented "an unsubstantiated conspiracy theory as fact," and falsely implied Irving's involvement in a conspiracy against Cleary. Irving demanded CBC "immediately remove the story from their website, publish a full retraction, and apologize for their appalling behaviour." Poitras responded on Twitter: "We stand by our story."

In 2016 and 2017, JDI filed two complaints with the CBC ombudsman seeking to bar Poitras from reporting on the Irving family; both were dismissed. CBC Ombudsman Esther Enkin stated that restricting Poitras "would amount to a form of censorship."

== Divisions ==
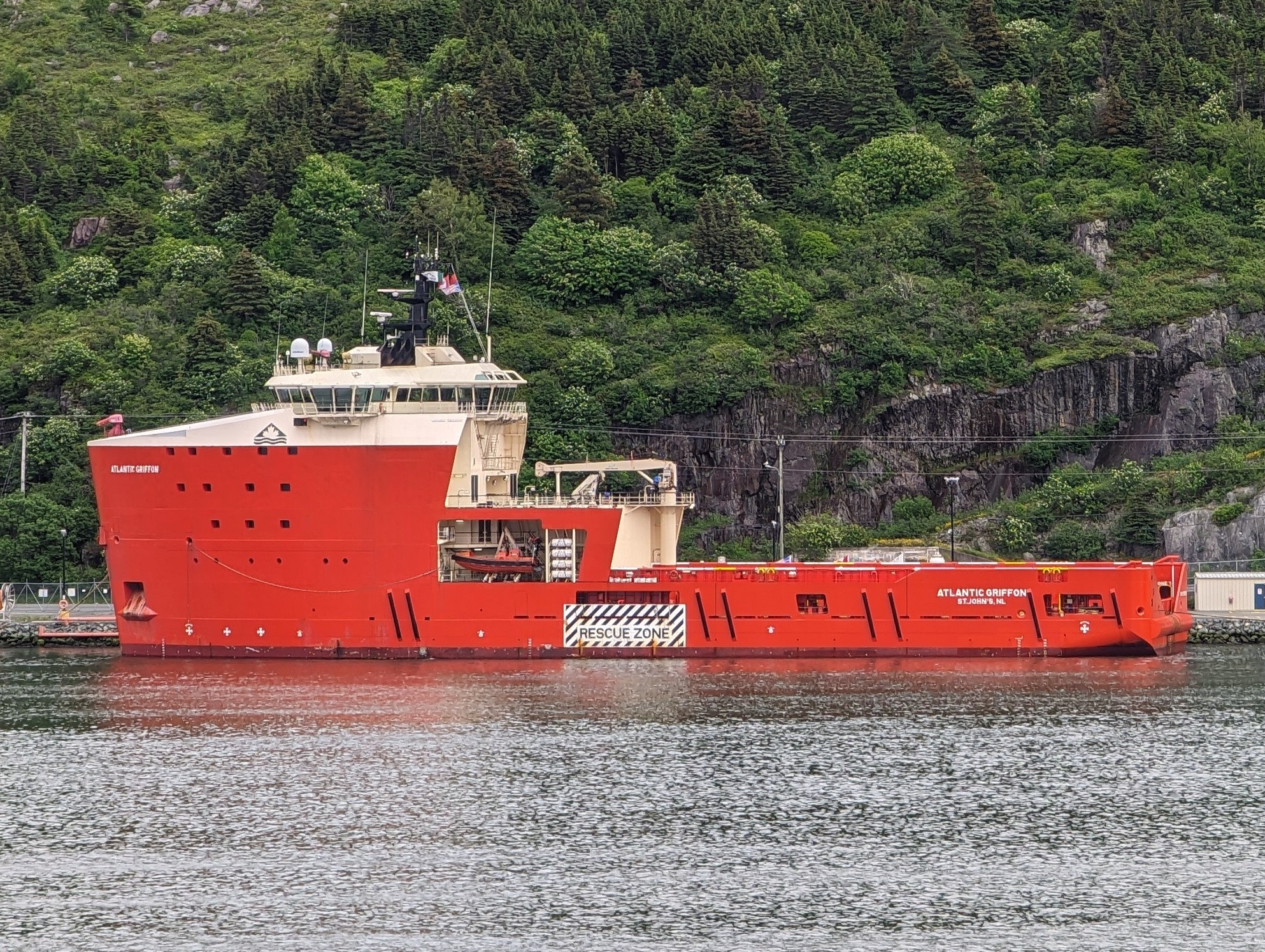
Atlantic Towing-owned Atlantic Griffon in St. John's Harbour in 2023

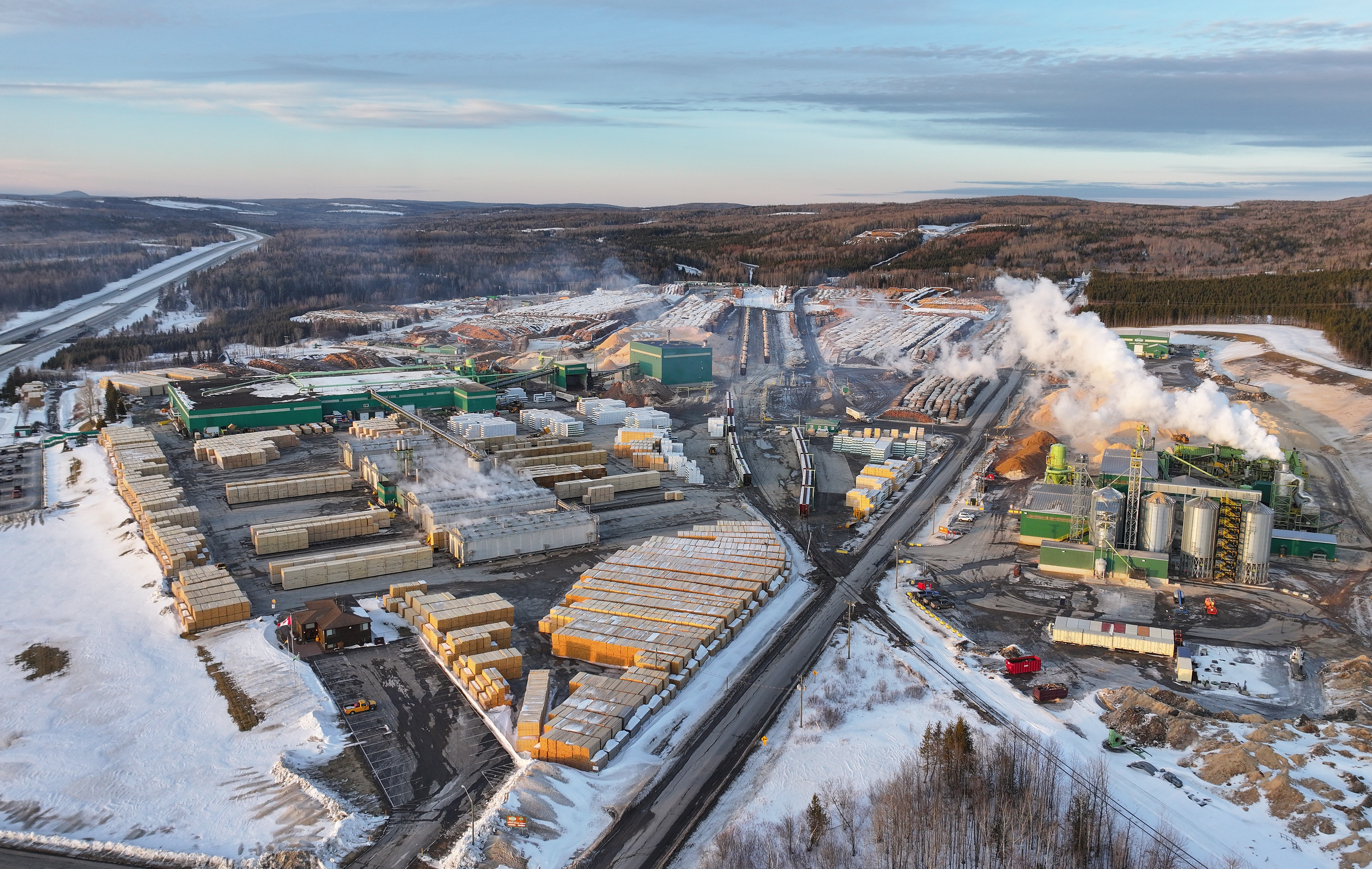
Grande Rivière Sawmill in Saint-Leonard, New Brunswick

J.D. Irving, Limited operates through numerous subsidiaries and divisions. Notable current divisions include:

- Irving Tissue Co. Ltd.
- New Brunswick Railway Co. Ltd.
  - New Brunswick Southern Railway Co. Ltd.
  - Eastern Maine Railway Co. Ltd.
  - Maine Northern Railway Co. Ltd.
- Saint John Shipbuilding
- Halifax Shipyard
- Irving Tissue (brands: Royale, Scotties, private labels)
- Cavendish Farms (frozen potato processing)
- Midland Transport (transportation and logistics)
- Irving Equipment (crane rental, heavy lifting, specialized transportation, pile driving, and project management)
- Moncton Wildcats (Quebec Maritimes Junior Hockey League franchise owned by Robert Irving)

=== East Isle Shipyard ===
East Isle Shipyard is a shipbuilding facility in Georgetown, Prince Edward Island and owned by Irving Shipbuilding. Located on Water Street with a single slipway along Georgetown Harbour, it is the province's sole active shipyard.

Founded as Bathurst Marine in Bathurst, New Brunswick, in 1961, the yard relocated to Georgetown in 1965. It operated under various names before adopting its current designation in the 1990s. The yard built fishing trawlers in the 1960s, diversified operations in the 1970s, and specialized in tugboat construction from the 1990s onward. Staff layoffs occurred in 2010 due to reduced orders.

Notable vessels constructed at East Isle include:

- Fireboat tug Atlantic Spruce (1995)
- Tugboat Atlantic Oak (2004)
- Royal Canadian Navy Glen-class tugs:
  - CFAV Glenevis (YTB 642) (1976)
  - CFAV Glenbrook (YTB 643) (1976)
  - CFAV Glenside (YTB 644) (1977)

=== Former subsidiaries ===
The following were formerly part of J.D. Irving, Limited:

- Brunswick News, which published:
  - Telegraph-Journal (Saint John, New Brunswick)
  - Times & Transcript (Moncton, New Brunswick)
  - The Daily Gleaner (Fredericton, New Brunswick)
  - The Bugle-Observer (Woodstock, New Brunswick)
- Acadian Lines Ltd. (intercity bus service)
- Pictou Shipyard (Pictou, Nova Scotia)
