= James K. Irving =

Canadian businessman (1928–2024)

James K. Irving OC ONB
- Born: March 20, 1928; Saint John, New Brunswick, Canada
- Died: June 21, 2024 (aged 96); Saint John, New Brunswick, Canada
- Occupations: Business owner and executive
- Organization: J. D. Irving
- Spouse: Jean Elizabeth Saunders (m. 1951)
- Children: 4
- Father: K. C. Irving
- Relatives: Arthur Irving, John E. Irving (brothers)

James Kenneth Irving OC ONB (March 20, 1928 – June 21, 2024) was a Canadian billionaire businessman and the first of three sons in the Irving family born to industrialist K.C. Irving. Born in Saint John, New Brunswick, he was the owner and later chairman of J. D. Irving. By the time of his death, his net worth was estimated between $5.5 and $7.2 billion.

== Early life ==
James Kenneth Irving was born in Saint John, New Brunswick, on March 20, 1928, the first of three sons born to K. C. Irving and his wife, Harriet Lila Irving (née MacNarin), from Galloway in Kent County. He was educated at Rothesay Netherwood School, a private school in the nearby town of Rothesay.

== Career ==
Beginning in 1957, Irving's work in forestry had led to the planting of over a billion trees. Following K. C.'s death in 1992, ownership and responsibility for the Irving companies was divided amongst his sons, James, Arthur and Jack.

Irving assumed ownership and responsibility of the J. D. Irving conglomerate, which included ownership of several companies in multiple different fields, including logging, frozen foods, transportation and retail. He owned the Brunswick News publishing company until selling in 2022 to Postmedia, the publisher of major newspapers in New Brunswick, including the Telegraph-Journal, the Times & Transcript and The Daily Gleaner. He later served as J.D. Irving's chairman.

In 2000, Irving established the Partners Assisting Local Schools (PALS) program to work with local schools and "give children unique learning opportunities...to break the cycle of poverty for youth living in low-income neighborhoods through academic achievement and the school environment". In 2004, he co-chaired a $25 million fundraising campaign for the Université de Moncton along with Denis Losier. By the time of Irving's death, Forbes estimated his net worth at $5.5 billion, while the Bloomberg Billionaires Index guessed $7.2 billion.

== Personal life and death ==
Irving was married to philanthropist Jean E. Irving until her death in 2019; they had been married for 69 years. They had four children, Jim Jr., Robert, Mary Jean and Judy.

Irving died in Saint John on June 21, 2024, at the age of 96. He was the last of K. C. Irving's sons. His younger brother Arthur died a month earlier. Canadian Prime Minister Justin Trudeau called him "a symbol of Canadian entrepreneurship and philanthropy".

== Awards ==
Irving received an honorary doctorate from the Université de Moncton in 1989, for business administration. In November 2007, he was inducted into the 2008 Canadian Business Hall of Fame along with his two brothers.

In 2014, Irving received the Order of New Brunswick. In 2015, he received the Order of Canada, which described him as a "corporate leader who has advanced economic development in rural and urban New Brunswick".

In 2016, Irving and Shirley Dysart were made Rotary International's Paul Harris Fellows for creating PALS. In 2017, he won the Honorary Leader Award at the Diversity Champion Awards, organized by Pride of Race, Unity and Dignity through Education, an organization based in Saint John.
