= K. C. Irving =

Canadian businessman (1899–1992)

K. C. Irving OC
- K.C. Irving statue in Bouctouche
- Born: Kenneth Colin Irving; 14 March 1899; Bouctouche, New Brunswick, Canada
- Died: 13 December 1992 (aged 93); Saint John, New Brunswick, Canada
- Occupations: Capitalist; Entrepreneur; Industrialist
- Children: James, Arthur and John
- Parent: James Dergavel Irving (father)

Kenneth Colin Irving, OC (14 March 1899 – 13 December 1992) was a Canadian billionaire and businessman who founded a family empire spread across energy, logging and media interests, with an immense generations-long impact on the Canadian province of New Brunswick, leading the New Brunswick journalist John Edward Belliveau to assert that “No individual in any single Canadian province has ever held so much raw economic power” as Irving did. In 1989, he was made an Officer of the Order of Canada.

== Biography ==
=== Early life ===
Irving was born in Bouctouche, New Brunswick to local businessman James Dergavel Irving (colloquially known by his initials "J.D."), and Mary Elizabeth Irving (née Gifford), both descendants of Scottish immigrants. In his early years, K. C. Irving was viewed as a tough kid from a rough sawmill town on the Northumberland Strait. He began his entrepreneurial streak early, but this was tempered by the dawn of World War I. Irving attempted to enlist while being underage, but his father disapproved of it and sent him to Dalhousie University in Halifax, Nova Scotia. When he tried enlisting in Halifax, his father put an end to it by enrolling him at Acadia University in Wolfville. In 1918, Irving enlisted in the Royal Flying Corps and took pilot training in Britain, though he would return to Bouctouche without returning to university. Irving took a cross-country adventure to British Columbia before returning to Bouctouche.

=== The 1920s ===
While back in Bouctouche, Irving dabbled in the merchant trade, working as a Ford automobile salesman for a dealer in Richibucto at the age of 22. Within two years, the sales territory of southern Kent County was his. In 1924, he opened a petrol (gasoline) station under the Imperial Oil logo. He was unceremoniously dumped from that franchise within the year, whereupon he contacted Samuel Lloyd Noble in order to purchase a supply from him. By 1925 he opened a second service station in nearby Shediac. He would eventually transform what became known as Irving Oil into a 3,000 franchise distributor across the Maritimes.

At the age of 26, Irving was invited by the representative of Ford to take over the franchise in Saint John, the city he would make his home for the next 46 years. Early on, he switched his business to the Bank of Nova Scotia as the result of a fortuitous visit which acquainted him with the future president of the bank, Horace L. Enman. In 1926, he was awarded a Ford franchise in Halifax, and the concession for Ford tractors in the whole of the Maritimes. In 1929, he formed K. C. Irving Gas and Oil Ltd, in order to distribute the Noble supply. Haymarket Square Service Stations was formed in the late 1920s as a partnership with two others, one of whom he bought out after the first year. By 1930, Irving was selling petrol in Saint John, Bouctouche, Shediac, Moncton, Sussex, Campbellton, St. Stephen, Westville, Weymouth, Amherst and Truro. Also by 1930, his petrol business expanded into Prince Edward Island and Quebec's Magdalen Islands. In 1930, he sold 8,000,000 gallons, when one of his average service stations sold 70,000 gallons; that year, he employed 212 people in Saint John and 482 elsewhere. Irving saw that the petrol business was also an opportunity to purchase land, and in 1931 erected as his headquarters the Golden Ball Building at the corner of Sydney and Union streets.

=== The 1930s ===
Canada Veneers had been established in 1933 by Robert McMillan, chiefly to produce orange crates for another local company. In 1936, Irving underwrote $100,000 in Canada Veneer preferred shares with Frank Brennan as partners in Irving-Brennan Co. Ltd. Then in the same year, the veneer plant, which had occupied a defunct local horse race-track, burnt down. It revived, but in early January 1938 a shareholder withdrew his guarantee of a $17,000 bank loan, and in exchange for his guarantee of a $10,000 bank loan Irving gained control of the veneer firm. Irving later hired C.A. Kessler to teach his staff, in particular Art McNair, to cut thin and uniform plies, which would become a specialty of the firm.

By 1939, Irving had developed an ulcer, and tipped the scales at 215 pounds; the Lahey Clinic in Boston would in 1941 cure the ulcer.

=== WW2 ===
Irving obtained the contract from Ottawa or London to build wooden landing barges for D-Day in Bouctouche. He set up the production facilities near the familial grist mill, and built bunkhouses on the family farm for the scores of workers.

=== 1963 Irving refinery strike ===
After joining the Oil, Chemical and Atomic Workers International Union in 1960, 145 Saint John Irving oil refinery workers pushed for the prevailing wage rate at Canadian oil refineries. The Irving refinery had high productivity but relatively low wages for the sector. Irving's counter-offer was below the wage-rate, leading to a strike in September 1963. The strikers called for a boycott of Irving gas stations, which gained some public support. Irving secured a court injunction against pickets at the gas stations and other secondary pickets. At least a dozen Irving truck driver depots in Quebec struck in sympathy with the refinery workers. On one march through downtown Saint John, refinery workers also burned K. C. Irving in effigy.

The strike became a national issue. The union appealed for donations from across the country, asking Canadians "Are you going to allow that a group of workers be slaughtered by an employer whose trade union notions are those of feudalism?" In addition to court injunctions limiting pickets at the refinery as well as banning secondary pickets at other Irving facilities, Irving also hired replacement workers or scabs. When a settlement was finally achieved in March 1964, Irving conceded wage increases masquerading as "merit pay" while a judge ruled the union pay Irving $2,000 for damaging his reputation.

=== Offshore holdings ===
Irving fought many battles with the federal government over income tax, business tax and inheritance tax policies. On 23 December 1971, following a particularly tough series of battles, he left Canada and re-settled in Nassau, Bahamas, ostensibly because of the estate tax situation: the Federal government planned to abolish estate taxes while the government of Premier Richard Hatfield (along with the other Maritime governments) planned to introduce an estate tax in its place.

Although he remained as majority shareholder, his sons controlled the daily operations of the conglomerate. From 1972 until his death, Irving would visit New Brunswick for "6 months, less a day" each year. In 2018, Forbes magazine estimated that the Irvings' net worth was $US12 billion.

=== Later life and death ===
Irving died at home in Saint John and was buried alongside his first wife in Bermuda. Later, his body was exhumed, along with his wife's. They were re-buried outside the Scottish-style church on the Irving Manor in Bouctouche. Their graves were only marked as "Grammy and Grampy".

== Legacy ==
In 1927, Irving married Harriet McNairn (1899–1976), a boyhood sweetheart, and the following year his first son was born. He was the father of, in 1928 James Kenneth, in 1930 Arthur Lee, and in 1932 John Ernest; the family attended St John's and St Stephen's Presbyterian Church. Irving would, after his sons all had graduated, provide for a new building at Rothesay Collegiate School.

Ownership and operation of the Irving group of companies ultimately divided among his three sons and their respective children, James, the oldest brother and his (James') two sons, Jim and Robert, took more control of forest products and several other divisions, Arthur the middle brother assumed more autonomy in Irving Oil, which owns the Saint John, New Brunswick Irving Oil Refinery, Canada's largest refinery, and Jack who looked after much of the construction, engineering and Radio & Television stations.

=== Corporate Landmarks ===
Acquisitions are listed in italic print.

Name	Start	End	Ref, notes
K. C. Irving Oil and Gas Ltd	1929		How & Costello 1993, p. 36
Haymarket Square Service Stations	1929		How & Costello 1993, p. 38
Commercial Equipment			How & Costello 1993, p. 143
Irving Equipment			How & Costello 1993, p. 143
Maritime Tire			How & Costello 1993, p. 45
Canada Veneers	1938		How & Costello 1993, p. 61
Eastern Timbers Ltd.	1940		How & Costello 1993, p. 61
D'Auteuil Lumber Co.	1941		How & Costello 1993, p. 62
Dexter Sulphite	1942		How & Costello 1993, p. 64
Shore Motor Transport	1935?		How & Costello 1993, p. 48 SMT (Eastern) Ltd
Scotia Motor Transport	1935?		How & Costello 1993, p. 48 SMT (Eastern) Ltd
Island Motor Transport	1935?		How & Costello 1993, p. 48
Steel and Engine Products		2004	How & Costello 1993, p. 80 Liverpool, NS
Ocean Steel Construction Ltd.			How & Costello 1993, p. 143
Strescon Ltd.			How & Costello 1993, p. 116
Thorne's Hardware	1942		How & Costello 1993, p. 81
Chinic Hardware			How & Costello 1993, p. 81
Lewis Brothers			How & Costello 1993, p. 81 Montreal, hardware
Universal Sales Ltd.	1925?		How & Costello 1993, p. 48 Ford dealership, bus bodies
New Brunswick Publishing Co. Ltd.			
Moncton Publishing Co. Ltd.			
New Brunswick Broadcasting Co. Ltd.			
University Press of New Brunswick Ltd.			
Harbor Development Ltd.			How & Costello 1993, p. 143
Saint John Drydock Co. Ltd.			How & Costello 1993, p. 143
Irving Chandler Sales			How & Costello 1993, p. 143
Kent Line			How & Costello 1993, p. 143 shipping (oil tankers)
Atlantic Towing Ltd.			How & Costello 1993, p. 143 tugboats
Canaport			How & Costello 1993, p. 143
Road and Sea Transport			How & Costello 1993, p. 143 trucking (oil)
Port Royal Pulp and Paper Co.	1946		How & Costello 1993, p. 84
Saint John Sulphite Co. Ltd.			
Midland Trucking			How & Costello 1993, p. 337

== Criticism ==
=== J.D. Irving Limited ===
It was the growth of Irving Oil which largely financed K. C. Irving's other endeavours. Several years after starting Irving Oil, Irving took over his father's sawmill company in Bouctouche, J.D. Irving Limited, which was subsequently expanded many times. JDI was in the 1970s the largest single landowner in New Brunswick, Nova Scotia and Maine. JDI has also been identified as being one of the four largest private land-owners in the United States. These forest lands feed several pulp and paper plants and sawmills which in turn feed the company's paper, tissue, and diaper factories throughout New Brunswick, Nova Scotia, Maine, New York, Georgia, Quebec and Ontario.

=== Diversification and vertical integration ===
As the Irving industrial empire expanded during World War II and the post-war era, K. C. purchased shipyards and started various food processing, media, hardware, building supplies, transportation, engineering and construction companies - all of which are vertically integrated, meaning that each Irving company purchases the services of other Irving companies, keeping profits wholly within the conglomerate.

Irving companies are completely privately owned, and therefore all major business decisions are made by the family-members/owners. This has traditionally been a weakness among many family-owned empires. However, the Irvings have proven their ability to react to market situations much more quickly than their publicly traded competitors, a primary reason for their maintaining market share in so many industries throughout eastern North America. An example can be seen in the fact that Irving Oil undertook significant upgrades and expansions to its refinery in the late mid to late 1990s to produce low-sulphur gasoline, fully a decade ahead of the rest of the North American oil industry. As a result, Irving has been able to capitalize on the growing need for low-emission fuel in California and other U.S. markets (delivered by its own ships).

The conglomerate operates with considerable latitude which the Irving family's wealth permits—operating somewhat as a maverick to the consternation of many of Central and Western Canada's business leaders. Irving Oil, J.D. Irving and all subsidiary companies are actively supporting Canada's ratification and implementation of the Kyoto Protocol, since the family has invested considerable funds into environmental controls and alternative energy for its operations and wishes to capitalize on these investments at the expense of its slow-to-respond publicly traded competitors. J.D. Irving's food processing plants in Prince Edward Island are looking to build one of the largest wind farms in Canada in that province to completely power their operations, and many Irving-owned sawmills and factories in the rest of northeastern North America are rapidly adopting co-generation, bio-gas and solar/wind power to complement current energy usage.

The Irving family is also hoping to take advantage of deregulation of utility markets in the region by building natural gas-fired electrical generating stations and is currently building a liquified natural gas terminal near its Saint John refinery. Irving fought with Premier Louis Robichaud that the province did not need outside financiers and industrialists to develop NB resources, insisting the province and by extension his corporation, could do it themselves.

=== New Brunswick media concentration ===
Irving strongly shunned public attention, and always "operated in the most private way possible" The Irvings have an almost complete monopoly in print media in New Brunswick, owning all English and French daily newspapers but one (L'Acadie Nouvelle) and most English weekly and community papers. Journalist John Edward Belliveau noted “He owned newspapers and a radio station, but their main purpose seemed to be to keep his name out of them rather than in them.”

In the 1970s, when this concentration was limited to only four English daily newspapers, the Senate created a commission of inquiry into media concentration because of the Irving family's control.

The grandson of J.K. Irving and son of Jim Irving, Jamie Irving became publisher of the Irving-owned New Brunswick Telegraph-Journal then vice-president of the newspaper holding company.

Irving had a near monopoly in media in New Brunswick well into the 1980s when they owned several English radio stations and CHSJ-TV, the only CBC affiliate in the province. Irving also started MITV (Maritime Independent Television) as a competitor across the Maritimes with the ATV network. The CBC affiliate was sold to the public broadcaster in 1994 at the same time as MITV was sold to CanWest Global.

=== Irving family wealth ===
According to the 2011 list of Canadians by net worth the combined net worth of the Irving family ranked third in Canada calculated with the net worth of Arthur Irving, James Irving and John Irving through Irving Oil Ltd. and J.D. Irving Ltd at $8.07 billion with no change from 2010. In 2008 the Canadian Business magazine's annual report on the wealthiest Canadians calculated that the Irving family combined wealth rose 34 percent from 2007 to $US 7.11 billion. Only the Thomson family, with a net worth is US$18.45 billion, were wealthier.

However, since the conglomerate is privately held and the family is private with respect to financial matters, no information on net worth is available. Most observers have only the tangible values of real property and industrial assets upon which to base their estimates without any ability to assess the value of cash reserves or outstanding debt and obligations. Despite Forbes's estimates, the overall Irving family fortune is likely to be grossly underestimated because of complex tax avoiding schemes which blur evidence behind a network of number companies and international holdings. In 1981, the National Film Board movie "I Like to See Wheels Turn" mentioned Canadian Lawyer Peter Glennie's findings. Glennie had compiled company registrations and the rare public documents on the Irving wealth. His estimations on the Irving family wealth were 7 billion in 1981 Canadian dollars (worth 22 billion in 2019 inflation-adjusted Canadian dollars).

== Personal views ==
Through his life, Irving held to a Knoxian philosophy and opposed the use of alcohol and smoking.

Irving was previously a supporter of the New Brunswick Liberal Association, then-led by Louis Robichaud. Irving had long been challenged by critics for "the tax concessions he and other industrialists have extracted from the province over the years" as well as Irving industrial plant-caused pollution. Irving began supporting the Progressive Conservative Party of New Brunswick after Robichaud pushed back against tax concessions.

== See also ==
- Irving Group of Companies
