= Telegraph-Journal =

Canadian newspaper in New Brunswick

- Front page of the Telegraph Journal
- Type: Daily newspaper
- Format: Broadsheet
- Owner: Postmedia Network
- Founded: 1862
- Circulation: 233,549 Weekly
- Price: $3.00 CAD Monday to Friday $3.50 CAD Saturday; Not published on Sunday
- Readership: ~100,000 Daily
- Sister newspapers: The Daily Gleaner; Times & Transcript
- ISSN: 0837-3736
- OCLC number: 1081147785
- Website: tj.news/telegraph-journal

The Telegraph-Journal is a daily newspaper published in Saint John, New Brunswick, Canada, owned by Postmedia Network. It serves as both a provincial daily and as a local newspaper for Saint John. First published in 1862, The Telegraph-Journal is the only New Brunswick-based English-language newspaper to be distributed province-wide, and has the highest readership in the province at a weekly circulation of 233,549 and a daily readership of about 100,000.

In May 2022 the Monday print edition was discontinued, and in March 2023 the print edition was reduced to three days a week. Daily news coverage continues online.

== History ==
The paper has been published out of Saint John since 1862, when it was started as The Morning Telegraph. The paper merged with several other New Brunswick papers in the following decades: the Morning Journal in 1869, The Sun in 1910, and The Daily Journal in 1923, which is when it first adopted the name Telegraph-Journal. Capitalist Kenneth Colin (K.C.) Irving, without formal announcement bought New Brunswick Publishing and the Telegraph-Journal, as well as a local Saint John radio station CHSJ in 1944. Eventually word got out that Irving had bought the paper as he began purchasing others in the province.

In 1998, the Irving family created Brunswick News to merge their various media holdings, including the Telegraph-Journal. In 2001, the Telegraph-Journal merged with the Saint John Times Globe, which had already been under the same ownership for many years. The Times Globe was replaced with a locally-focused edition of the paper titled the Saint John Telegraph-Journal. In 2022, Toronto-based Postmedia acquired Brunswick News for $7.5 million cash and $8.6 million in variable voting shares.

== Controversies ==
The Telegraph-Journal has been the focus of controversy several times, with allegations of media control, bias and advocacy journalism on behalf of business and political interests. A report from the Canadian Senate in 2006 on media control in Canada singled out New Brunswick because of the Irving companies' ownership of all English-language daily newspapers in the province, including the Telegraph-Journal. Senator Joan Fraser, author of the Senate report, stated, "We didn't find anywhere else in the developed world a situation like the situation in New Brunswick." The report went further, stating, "the Irvings' corporate interests form an industrial-media complex that dominates the province" to a degree "unique in developed countries." At the Senate hearing, journalists and academics cited Irving newspapers' lack of critical reporting on the family's influential businesses.

Irving family scion Jamie Irving took over as publisher in 2005, after which criticism of the Telegraph-Journal's journalism became even more prevalent. This was particularly notable during the newspaper's reporting of issues related to electricity rates and NB Power, the crown corporation responsible for power generation and distribution. Editorials argued against rate increases that would harm J.D. Irving Ltd but failed to acknowledge the conflict of interest.

In 2009 the Telegraph-Journal weathered a storm of national attention after a series of incidents that raised issues regarding the newspaper's credibility. The Telegraph-Journal faced charges of political bias when it fired intern Matt McCann for writing a story about a protest against the award by the University of New Brunswick of an honorary degree to New Brunswick Premier Shawn Graham. In response to the firing, respected professors from the University of New Brunswick, Mount Allison University and St. Thomas University announced a boycott of the newspaper.

Further controversy arose over the Telegraph-Journal's reporting of municipal affairs in Saint John. The newspaper ran a series of stories alleging mismanagement and inappropriate conduct by the City Manager and senior staff, based on what were later seen as fabrications, and faced allegations that it was using negative coverage to blackmail the City into making changes in administration and the tax rate. This led to a very public conflict between the Mayor and the newspaper.

Shortly after, in the "Wafergate" affair, Telegraph-Journal editors altered a news story about the funeral of Governor General Roméo LeBlanc to allege that the Prime Minister of Canada 'pocketed' a communion wafer while attending. The resulting controversy dominated national news coverage. Embarrassingly, the Telegraph-Journal was later forced to retract the allegation and apologize for fabricating the story after its own reporters threatened a lawsuit over editorial manipulation. The newspaper's credibility suffered further under critical national media attention. Editor Shawna Richer was dismissed and publisher Jamie Irving was suspended. A well-respected editor was brought in from outside the province to rehabilitate the publication, though Jamie Irving quietly returned to manage the Telegraph-Journal later in the year.

Controversy continued in 2009 when a Telegraph-Journal writer plagiarized an entire story from the French-language paper, L’Acadie Nouvelle. The incident triggered another apology from the Telegraph-Journal.

In 2015 the Telegraph-Journal once again came under scrutiny over its efforts to obtain, as part of a campaign for greater transparency into government lobbying and partisanship, lists of guests at the Government of New Brunswick's "Larry’s Gulch" luxury fishing lodge. An employee of Brunswick News, the newspaper's parent organization, had been a guest at the lodge and contrived to have his own name deleted from the lists prior to publication. Brunswick News had become aware of this ethical breach but didn't act until another news outlet, Canadaland, was about to break the story. The employee was forced out, and despite its earlier fervour for transparency the Telegraph-Journal quietly dropped further efforts to publish Larry's Gulch guest lists. Court proceedings in 2019 suggested that greater Irving family control over the newspaper's editorial direction was a factor in how the organization handled this affair.

== See also ==
- List of newspapers in Canada
