= Arthur Irving =

Canadian billionaire businessman (1930–2024)

Arthur Irving OC ONB
- Born: Arthur Lee Irving; July 14, 1930; Saint John, New Brunswick, Canada
- Died: May 13, 2024 (aged 93); Boston, Massachusetts, U.S.
- Education: Acadia University (dropped out)
- Occupations: Businessman; chancellor
- Known for: Owning Irving Oil
- Spouses: Joan Carlisle Irving (div. 1980) Sandra Ring (after 1980)
- Children: 5, including Sarah Irving
- Parent: K. C. Irving
- Relatives: James K. Irving (brother); John E. Irving (brother)

Arthur Lee Irving OC ONB (July 14, 1930 – May 13, 2024) was a Canadian billionaire businessman, the second son of industrialist K. C. Irving of the Irving family. Born in Saint John, New Brunswick, Irving was the president of Irving Oil, and later became its sole owner through the Arthur Irving Family Trust. By the time of his death, his net worth was estimated between US$6.4 billion and US$9.8 billion.

Additionally, Irving served as the chancellor of Acadia University between 1996 and 2010, where he previously attended before dropping out to pursue the family-owned industry. Irving was also a longtime board member of Ducks Unlimited Canada. Irving received honours and awards including the Order of New Brunswick and the Order of Canada.

== Biography ==
Arthur Irving was born on July 14, 1930 in Saint John, New Brunswick, the second son of industrialist K. C. Irving. His mother, Harriet Lila Irving (née MacNarin), was from Galloway in Kent County. Irving attended the Winter Street School as well as the Rothesay Collegiate School. He was later temporarily enrolled at Acadia University, of which he later served as chancellor between 1996 and 2010, though he later dropped out to pursue work in the family industry. In 1951, he began working at Irving Oil, later becoming its president in 1972, following the retirement of his father.

Irving spent over three decades on Ducks Unlimited Canada's board of directors, and was president from 1986 to1987.

Following their father's death in 1992, ownership and responsibility for the Irving companies were divided amongst Irving along with his brothers James and Jack. Irving Oil's responsibility was passed to Irving, which included its gas stations, oil refineries, oil tankers, distribution terminals and other facilities, while a portion of the company's stake was given to Jack, which his family later sold to the Arthur Irving Family Trust in 2018.

While serving as its chancellor, Irving, along with his two brothers, donated two facilities to Acadia University in 2002: the K. C. Irving Environmental Science Centre, as well as the Harriet Irving Botanical Gardens. In 2012, in partnership with Acadia University and Ducks Unlimited Canada, Irving established the Beaubassin Research Station in Aulac. In 2016, Dartmouth accepted $80 million from the Irving family to set up the Arthur L. Irving Institute for Energy and Society.

Until October 2023, Irving served as the Irving Oil board of directors' chairman, though he continued to work in the business until his death. His stepping down came amidst a "strategic review of the company's future" announced earlier in June 2023, in which there was mention that the review "could lead to its full or partial sale."

== Awards ==
In 2002, Irving was made an Officer of the Order of Canada, and in 2012, he was made a member of the Order of New Brunswick. In November 2007, Irving was inducted into the 2008 Canadian Business Hall of Fame along with his two brothers. The following year, both Irving and his wife received honorary Doctor of Letters degrees by the University of New Brunswick. In 2013, Irving was New Brunswick's inductee for the Canadian Red Cross Humanitarian Award. In 2019, Irving received the Paul Harris Fellowship honoured by Rotary International.

== Personal life and death ==
Irving was married to Joan Carlisle. They had four children before divorcing in 1980. His second marriage was with Sandra Ring, with whom he had a daughter, Sarah Irving. Irving lived in Saint John while additionally owning a residence in Boston, Massachusetts.

On May 13, 2024, Irving died from cancer at the age of 93, at the Massachusetts General Hospital. By the time of his death, Forbes had estimated his net worth being at US$6.4 billion, while Bloomberg estimated his net worth at US$9.8 billion. His funeral took place in Saint John.

== See also ==
- List of Canadian university leaders
