= List of rocket artillery =

Rocket artillery is a type of artillery equipped with rocket launchers instead of conventional guns or mortars.

== List of rocket artillery systems ==
Note that the "Calibre" of rocket projectiles may not refer to the warhead diameter but to the launch tube diameter.

=== Modern era ===
| Caliber (mm) | Tubes | Weapon name | Country of origin | Operational period |
|---|---|---|---|---|
| 60 | 1 | Qassam 1 | Palestine | |
| 500 | 3 | Golan-1000 | Syria | |
| 107 | 240 | Jobaria Defense Systems Multiple Cradle Launcher | United Arab Emirates | |
| 110 | 1 | Qassam 4 | Palestine | |
| 117, 180, or 227 | 60 | Thunderbolt-2000 | Republic of China | since 2010 |
| 122 | 40 | WR-40 Langusta | Poland | |
| 107 | 12 | T-107 | Turkey | |
| 122 | 1,4,8,16,24, 40 | DS-240 Arjuna | Indonesia | |
| 122 | 40 | T-122 | Turkey | |
| 122 | 40 | DTI-2 | Thailand | |
| 122 | 40 | MAM-01 multiple launch rocket system | Myanmar | Since 2004 |
| 122 | 40 | RS-122 | Georgia | |
| 122 | 240 | Jobaria Defense Systems Multiple Cradle Launcher | United Arab Emirates | |
| 127 | 27 | CP-30 | Argentina | |
| 127 | 36 | SAPBA | Argentina | |
| 127 | 24 | Valkiri multiple rocket launcher | South Africa | |
| 127 | 40 | Bateleur multiple rocket launcher | South Africa | |
| 128 | 12-16 x 2 | LRSVM Morava | Serbia | |
| 150 | 1 | Qassam 2 | Palestine | |
| 160 | 26 | LAROM | Romania | Since 1999 |
| 180 | 40 | Astros SS-AV-40 | Brazil | Since 2012 |
| 200 | 1 | Qassam 3 | Palestine | |
| 214 | 12 | Pinaka | India | Since 2000 |
| 220 | 30 | TOS-1 | Russia | |
| 227 | 12 | M270 MLRS | United States | |
| 227 | 6 | M142 HIMARS | United States | |
| 230 | 12 | TOROS missile—medium range | Turkey | |
| 240 | 12 | Fajr-3 | Iran | Since 1996 |
| 240 | 6 | Falaq-1 | Iran | |
| 240 | 12 | MAM-02 multiple launch rocket system | Myanmar | Since 2018 |
| 260 | 8 | TOROS missile—long range | Turkey | |
| 262 | 12 | M-87 "Orkan" | Yugoslavia Serbia | |
| 306 | 8 | Lynx-EXTRA | Israel | |
| 300 | 4 | T-300 Kasırga | Turkey | since 2000 |
| 300 | 6 | 9A52-4 Tornado | Russia | Since 2011 |
| 300 | 8 | KN-09 (MRL) | North Korea | Since 2016 |
| 300 | 8 | Polonez | Belarus | Since 2016 |
| 302 | 8 | WS-1A | China | |
| 302 | 4 | WS-1B | China | |
| 302 | 4 | Kasirga rocket system | Turkey | |
| 302 | 4 | DTI-1 | Thailand | |
| 333 | 4 | Fajr-5 | Iran | |
| 333 | 1 | Falaq-2 | Iran | |
| 450 | 4 | Astros SS-150 | Brazil | Since 2008 |
| 122 | 40 | KRL-122 | Pakistan | Since 2001 |
| | 8 | Fatah II | Pakistan | Since 2022 |
| | 8 | Fatah I | Pakistan | Since 2021 |
| 610 | 2 | MGM-140 ATACMS | United States | Since 1990 |
| 610 | 1 | Zelzal-2 | Iran | Since 1993 |
| 610 | 1 | Zelzal-3 | Iran | Since 1993 |
| 920 | 2 | 9K720 Iskander | Russia | |
| 300 | 6 | Sarma | Russia | Since 2026 |
| 220, 302 | N/A | Fadi family of rockets | Lebanon (Hezbollah) | Since 2024 |
| 600 | 6 | KN-25 | North Korea | |
| 131,230,239,280,600 | 12,40 | K239 Chunmoo | South Korea | Since 2015 |
| 130,131 | 36 | K136 Kooryong | South Korea | Since 1981 |

=== Cold War era ===
| Caliber (mm) | Tubes | Weapon name | Country of origin | Operational period |
|---|---|---|---|---|
| 70 | 24 | Rancudo | Philippines | 1960s - 1980s |
| 70 | 42 | EDESA Yarará | Argentina | |
| 70 | 36 | SBAT-70 | Brazil | |
| 180 | 6 (short version); 1 (long version) | Bongbong (rocket) | Philippines | 1965 - 1986 |
| 70 | 20 & 40 | NDL-40 | Indonesia | 1985 - |
| 70 | 6 | Sumpak | Philippines | |
| 80 | 12 | D-3000 Walid | Egypt | |
| 105 | 16 | Pampero | Argentina | |
| 107 | 12 | Type 63 multiple rocket launcher | China | |
| 107 | 12 | Fajr-1 | Iran | |
| 110 | 36 | Leichtes Artillerie-Raketen-System (LARS) | Germany | 1968 - 1991 |
| 110 | 36 | Leichtes Artillerie-Raketen-System 2 (LARS 2) | Germany | 1980 - 2000 |
| 115 | 1 | XM70E2 Towed Multiple Launch Rocket | United States | |
| 117 | 45 | Kung Feng VI | Republic of China | 1982 - |
| 122 | 40 | FIROS-25 / 30 | Italy | 1987 |
| 122 | 40 | RM-70 | Czechoslovakia | 1972 - |
| 122 | 40 | Sakr-18 | Egypt | |
| 122 | 40 | Type 81 multiple rocket launcher | China | |
| 122 | 40 | Type 90 multiple rocket launcher | China | |
| 122 | 40 | HM 20 | Iran | |
| 122 | 40 | BM-21/9K51 Grad | Soviet Union | 1963 - |
| 126 | 40 | Kung Feng III | Republic of China | 1973 - |
| 126 | 40 | Kung Feng IV | Republic of China | 1973 - |
| 127 | 32 | Astros SS-30 | Brazil | 1983 - |
| 128 | | M71 rocket | Yugoslavia | |
| 128 | 32 | M-63 "Plamen" | Yugoslavia Serbia | |
| 128 | 32 | M-77 "Oganj" | Yugoslavia Serbia | |
| 130 | 19 | Type 70 multiple rocket launcher | China | |
| 130 | 36 | Kooryong | South Korea | |
| 130 | 32 | RM-51 | Czechoslovakia | |
| 130 | 30 | Type 75 130 mm multiple rocket launcher | Japan | |
| 140 | 40 | Teruel (multiple rocket launcher) | Spain | 1985 - |
| 140 | 16 | BM-14/RPU-14 | Soviet Union | |
| 160 | 26 | LAR-160 | Israel | |
| 180 | 16 | Astros SS-40 | Brazil | |
| 200 | 4 | BMD-20 | Soviet Union | 1951 - 1979 |
| 220 | 16 | BM-27/9P140 Uragan | Soviet Union | 1977 - |
| 230 | | Oghab | Iran | |
| 240 | 12 | BM-24 | Soviet Union | |
| 240 | 36 | MAR-240 | Israel | |
| 250 | 6 | BM-25 | Soviet Union | |
| 273 | 8 | WM-80 | China | |
| 290 | 4 | MAR-290 | Israel | |
| 300 | 3 | Avibras X-40 | Brazil | |
| 300 | 4 | Astros SS-60 | Brazil | 1983 - |
| 300 | 4 | Astros SS-80 | Brazil | 1983 - |
| 300 | 12 | BM-30/9K58 Smerch | Soviet Union | 1989 - |
| 337 | 2 | Type 67 Model 30 Rocket Artillery | Japan | 1968 - 1992 |
| 550 | 1 | 9K52 Luna-M (FROG-7) | Soviet Union | 1965 - |
| 610 | 1 | Zelzal-1 | Iran | 1990 - |
| 650 | 1 | OTR-21 Tochka (SS-21 Scarab) | Soviet Union | 1976 - |
| 880 | 1 | 9K72 Elbrus (Scud) | Soviet Union | 1957 - |
| 890 | 1 | OTR-23 Oka (SS-23 Spider) | Soviet Union | 1972 - 2002 |

=== World War II era ===
| Caliber (mm) | Tubes | Weapon name | Country of origin | Operational period |
|---|---|---|---|---|
| 57 | | Rocket Projectile, 2 inch | United Kingdom | |
| 72.4 | 1 | 7.3 cm Propagandawerfer 41 | Nazi Germany | |
| 72.9 | 35 | Henschel Hs 297 / 7.3 cm Föhn-Gerät | Nazi Germany | |
| 76.2 | 1-36 | Z Battery | United Kingdom | |
| 76.2 | 32 | Land Mattress | United Kingdom | |
| 78 | 24 or 48 | 8 cm Raketen-Vielfachwerfer | Nazi Germany | |
| 82 | 8 | BM-8-8 (jeep) | Soviet Union | |
| 82 | 24 | BM-8-24 (tank) | Soviet Union | |
| 82 | 36 | BM-8-36 (truck) | Soviet Union | 1941 - |
| 82 | 48 | BM-8-48 (2½ ton truck) | Soviet Union | |
| 114 | | M8 4.5 inch Rocket | United States | |
| 132 | 16 | BM-13-16 Katyusha | Soviet Union | 1940 - |
| 150 | 6 | 15 cm Nebelwerfer 41 | Nazi Germany | |
| 150 | 10 | 15cm Panzerwerfer 42 | Nazi Germany | |
| 180 | 20 | Unrotated projectile | United Kingdom | |
| 190 | 1 | Type 10 and Type 3 Rocket Boosters | Japan | |
| 203 | 1 | Type 4 20 cm Rocket Launcher | Japan | |
| 210 | 1 | 20 cm Naval Rocket Launcher | Japan | |
| 210 | 5 | 21cm NbW 42 | Nazi Germany | |
| 280 | 6 | 28/32 cm Nebelwerfer 41 (also fired 32 cm calibre ordnance) | Nazi Germany | |
| 300 | 6 | 30cm NbW 42 | Nazi Germany | |
| 300 | 6 | 30 cm Raketenwerfer 56 | Nazi Germany | |
| 300 | 4 or 6 | Wurfrahmen 40 | Nazi Germany | 1940 - 1945 |
| 300 | 1 | Type 21 and Type 22 Rocket-Bombs | Japan | |
| 300 | 4 | M-30 | Soviet Union | 1942 - |
| 300 | 12 | BM-31 (truck) | Soviet Union | 1944 - |
| 380 | 1 | Sturmtiger | Nazi Germany | |
| 400 | 1 | Type 4 40 cm Rocket Launcher | Japan | |
| 450 | 1 | 45 cm naval rocket | Japan | |

=== Prior to World War II ===
| Caliber (mm) | Tubes | Weapon name | Country of origin | Operational period |
|---|---|---|---|---|
| 50.8 | 20 or 50 | Volovsky rockets | Russian Empire | 20th century, 1912, Russian Empire |
| 76 | 1 | Mysorean rockets | Kingdom of Mysore | 18th century Southern India, |
| 46 | 100 | Singijeon Hwacha | Joseon | 15th century Munjong of Joseon |

== See also ==
- List of artillery by country
