= List of U.S. Army rocket launchers =

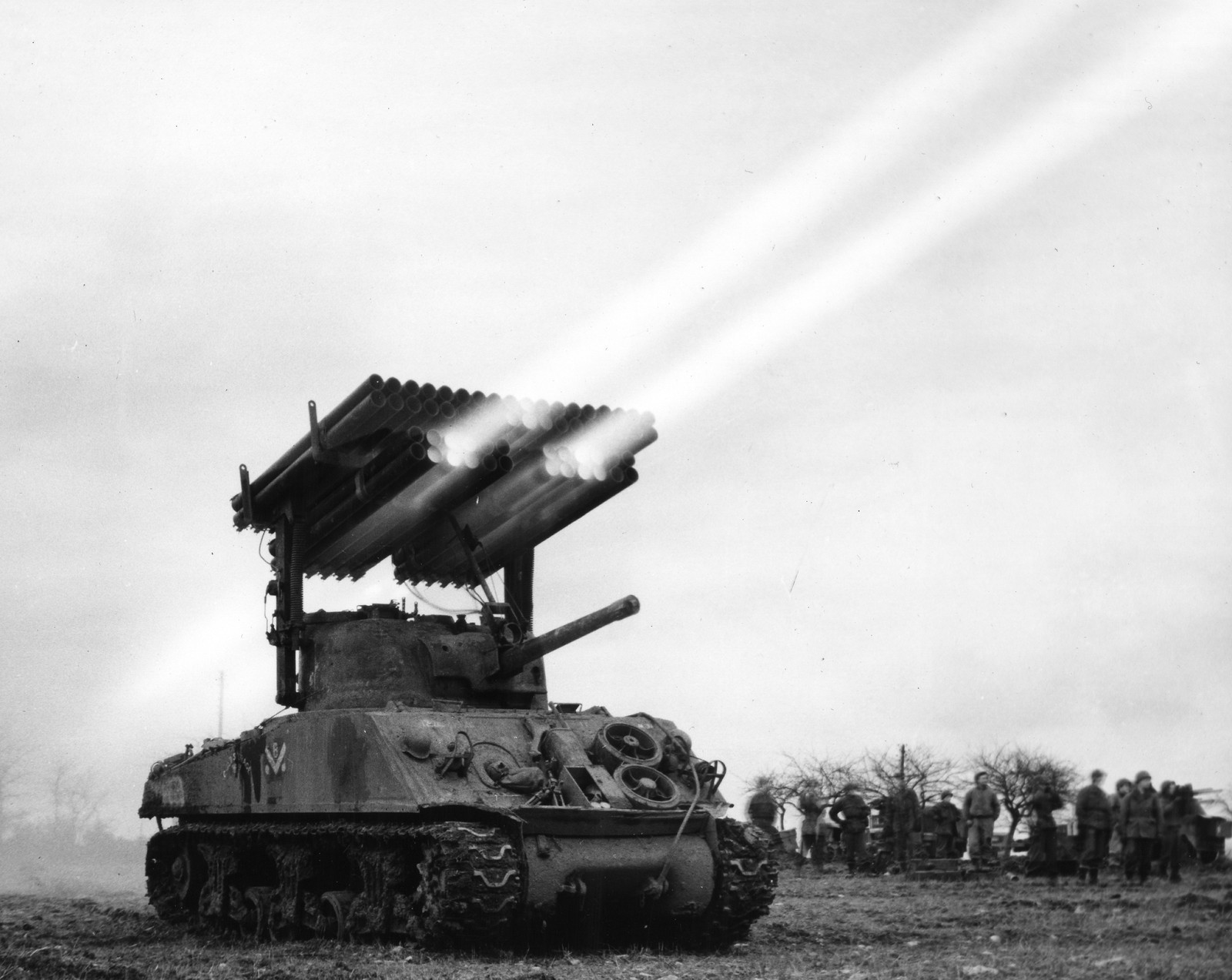
T-34 rocket launcher in France.

This is a list of U.S. Army rocket launchers by model number. Launchers can be either tube-type or rail-type.

== M number ==
Rockets
Rocket model	size	type	launcher
M1			
M2	3.25 Inch	target	M1 rocket projector
M3			
M4			
M5			
M6	2.36 Inch	HEAT	M9 bazooka
M7	2.36 Inch	practice	M9 bazooka
M8	4.5 Inch	HE	various
M9	4.5 Inch	practice	various
M10	2.36 Inch	smoke	M9 bazooka
M11			
M12			
M13			
M14			
M15			
M16	4.5 Inch	HE	M23 (T66) rocket launcher
M17	4.5 Inch	practice	M23 (T66) rocket launcher
M18			
M19			
M20	4.5 Inch	HE	
M21	4.5 Inch	practice	
M22			
M23			
M24	4.5 Inch	Drill	
M25	7.2 Inch	CG Gas	M24 rocket launcher
M26	2.36 Inch	Gas	M9 Bazooka
M27	7.2 Inch	CK Gas	M24 rocket launcher
M28	3.5 Inch	HEAT	M20 Super Bazooka
M29	3.5 Inch	practice	M20 Super Bazooka
M30	3.5 Inch	smoke	M20 Super Bazooka
M31			
M32			
M33			
M34			
M35			
M36			
M37			
M38			
M39			
M40			
M55	78x4.44Inchs	Chemical	M91 Rocket Launcher

== Launchers ==
- M1 rocket launcher, 2.36 inch, solid tube shoulder mount. Bazooka
  - A1 Simplified design with improved electrical system
- M1 rocket projector, 3.25 inch, rail, trailer mount
- M2
- M3
- M4
- M5
- M6
- M7
- M8 rocket launcher, possibly T34 rocket launcher?
- M9 rocket launcher, 2.36 inch, break down tube, shoulder mount. Bazooka
  - A1 Battery ignition replaced by trigger magneto
- M10 rocket launcher, 4.5 inch, 3 plastic tube, aircraft mount.
- M11
- M12 rocket launcher, 4.5 inch, single tube, tripod mount.
  - A1 plastic tube (M12/M12A1 use M8 HE rockets and M9 practice rockets)
  - E2 Magnesium alloy tube (uses T38E7 HE rockets and T39E7 practice rockets)
- M13
- M14 rocket launcher, 4.5 inch, 3 steel tube, aircraft mount.
- M15 rocket launcher, 4.5 inch, 3 magnesium tube, aircraft mount.
- M16 Rocket Projector on M4 Tank: 4.6 inch 60 tube rocket launcher (T-72)
- M17 rocket launcher, 7.2 inch, 20-tube, tank mount.
- M18 rocket launcher, 2.36 inch, aluminium break down tube, shoulder mount, bazooka
- M19
- M20 rocket launcher, 3.5 inch, break down tube, shoulder mount, Super Bazooka
- M21 rocket launcher, 4.5 inch, 25-tube, trailer mount. (T123)
- M22 rocket launcher, fixed, Nike (rocket) (Ajax)
- M23 rocket launcher, 4.5 inch, 24-tube, (T66)and(T66E2)?
- M24 rocket launcher, 7.2 inch, 24-rail, for M25 (CG Gas) or M27 (CK Gas) chemical rocket
- M25 rocket launcher, 3.5 inch, repeating, tripod-mounted, bazooka
- M26 rocket launcher, fixed, (M22 with racks) Nike (Ajax)
- M27 rocket launcher, rail type, for MGM-5 Corporal
- M28
- M29
- M30
- M31
- M32 rocket launcher, 4.5 inch, trailer mount
- M33 rocket launcher, trailer mount, for MGR-1 Honest John
- M34 rocket launcher, for MGR-3 Little John
- M35
- M36 rocket launcher, fixed, for Nike (rocket) (Hercules)
- M37
- M38
- M39
- M40
- M47 Dragon (1966)
- M48 rocket launcher, towed, MIM-72 Chaparral (1969)
- M65 aircraft mounted, BGM-71 TOW (1965)
- XM70E2 rocket launcher (1959-1963)
- M72 rocket launcher, 66mm, telescoping tube, shoulder mount, M72 LAW (1963)
- M74 rocket platform, towed, PGM-11 Redstone
- M78 rocket launcher, for MIM-23 Hawk (1959)
- (M81 gun/missile launcher 152mm for M551 Sheridan (1966)
- M91 rocket launcher, 115mm, 45-tube, trailer mount for M55 rocket
- M94 rocket launcher, mobile, Nike (rocket) (hercules)
- XM132 viper
- M136 AT4
- M141 Bunker Defeat Munition
- M141 rocket launcher, 2.75 inch, 7-tube aircraft mount, Mk 4/Mk 40 Folding-Fin Aerial Rocket
- M142 High Mobility Artillery Rocket System (HIMARS)
- M143 rocket launcher, 3.5-inch, 1-tube, tripod mount (M24 antitank mine)M24 mine
- M147 rocket launcher, 2.75 inch, FIM-43 Redeye (1961)
- M151 rocket launcher, BGM-71 TOW (1970)
- M157 rocket launcher, 2.75 inch, 7-tube, aircraft mount, Mk 4/Mk 40 Folding-Fin Aerial Rocket
- M158 rocket launcher, 2.75 inch, 7-tube aircraft mount, Mk 4/Mk 40 Folding-Fin Aerial Rocket
- M159 rocket launcher, 2.75 inch, 19-tube, aircraft mount, Mk 4/Mk 40 Folding-Fin Aerial Rocket
- M171 rocket launcher, 2.75 inch, FIM-43 Redeye (1966)
- M190 rocket launcher, 35mm, telescoping tube, practice M72 LAW
- XM-191 rocket launcher (standardized as M202)
- M192 rocket launcher, towed, triple launcher, MIM-23 Hawk
- M200 rocket launcher, 2.75 inch, 19-tube, aircraft mount, Mk 4/Mk 40 Folding-Fin Aerial Rocket
- M202 rocket launcher, 66mm 4-tube, (1969) M202A1 FLASH
- M220 TOW 2nd series
- M260 rocket launcher, 2.75 inch, 7-tube, Hydra 70
- M261 rocket launcher, 2.75 inch, 19-tube, Hydra 70
- M269 launcher/loader
- M270 Multiple Launch Rocket System (MLRS)
- M272 rocket launcher, 7 inch, 4-rail, AGM-114 Hellfire
- M279 rocket launcher, 7 inch, 2-rail, AGM-114 Hellfire
- M299 rocket launcher, 7 inch, 4-rail, AGM-114 Hellfire
- M310 rocket launcher, 7 inch, 2-rail, AGM-114 Hellfire
- M474 transporter erector launcher, Pershing 1
- M727 carrier/launcher, MIM-23 Hawk
- M730 carrier/launcher, MIM-72 Chaparral
- M752 carrier/launcher, MGM-52 Lance
- M790 erector launcher, Pershing 1a
- M901 launcher, trailer mount, MIM-104 Patriot
- M1003 erector launcher, Pershing II
- XM546 missile carrier/launcher, MIM-46 Mauler surface-to-air missile

== Test number ==
T numbers were given to development models.

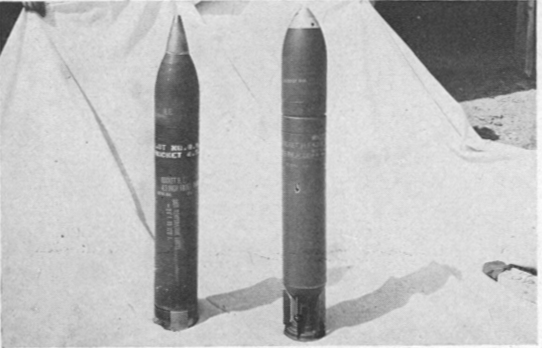
M16 and M8 rockets

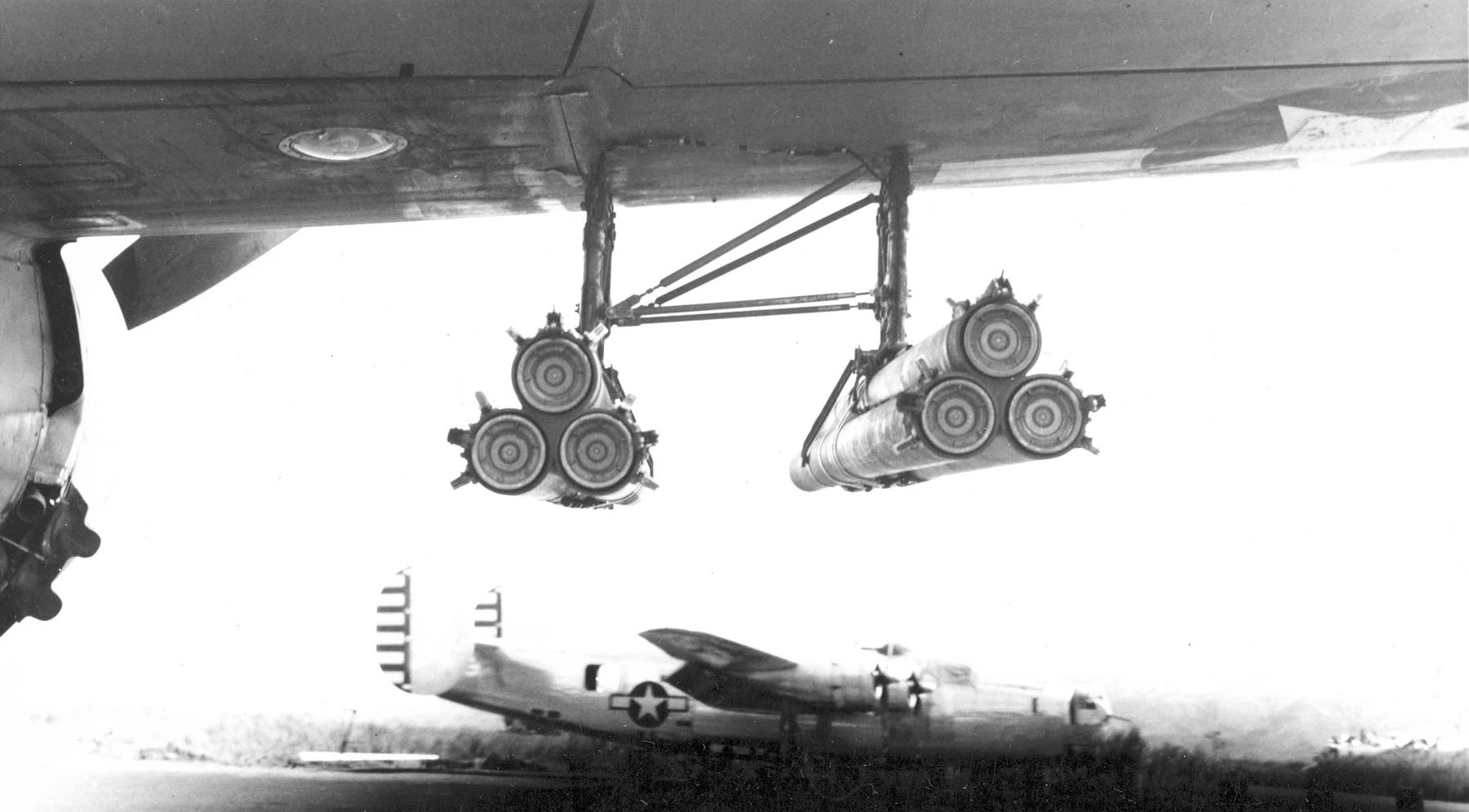
T-30 Rocket launcher

- T1 rocket launcher, 2.36 inch, solid tube shoulder mount. M1 bazooka
- T3 rocket launcher, 4.5 inch, 1-tube on M4 carriage, (37 mm Gun M3)
- T27 rocket launcher, 4.5 inch, 8-tube, vehicle or ground mount, Xylophone
- T28
- T29
- T30 rocket launcher, 4.5 inch, 3-tube, aircraft mount
- T31
- T32 rocket launcher, 4.5 inch, 32-tube, tank mount
- T33
- T34 rocket launcher, 4.5 inch, 60-tube, tank mount, T34 Calliope
- T35 rocket launcher, 4.5 inch, single tube, tripod mount, (M12)?
- T36 rocket launcher, 4.5 inch, 8-tube, jeep mount
- T37 rocket launcher, 7.2 inch, 20 tube, vehicle mount
- T38
- T39 rocket launcher, 7.2 inch, 20-tube,
- T40 rocket launcher, 7.2 inch, 20-tube, tank mount, (M17) (whiz-bang)
- T44 rocket launcher, 4.5 inch, 120 tube, DUKW mounted
- T45 automatic rocket launcher, 4.5 inch, frame and rail, vehicle mounted
- T59 rocket launcher, 10.75 inch, 18-rail, tracked trailer mount (mine clearing)
- T64 rocket launcher, 5 inch, 0-length rail, HVAR
- T66 rocket launcher, 4.5 inch, 24-tube, trailer mount, Honeycomb
- T72 Rocket Projector on M4 Tank: 4.6 inch 60 tube rocket launcher (standardized as M16?)
- T73 Rocket Projector on M4 Tank: 4.6 inch 10 tube rocket launcher
- T76 Rocket Projector on M4 Tank: 7.5 inch rocket launcher
- T99 Rocket Projector on M26 Tank: Two 11 tube launchers on sides of the turret
- T103 Rocket launcher, 8 inch, 1-rail, trailer mount
- T105 Rocket Projector on M4A1 Medium Tank: Long 7.2 inch launcher
- T123 rocket launcher, 4.5 inch, 25-tube, trailer mount,(M21) (1951)
- T128 rocket launcher, 46-tube, semi-mobile, Loki (rocket)
- T129 rocket launcher, 6.5 inch, Multiple Rocket Launcher (1952)
- T148 rocket launcher, rail, MGM-21 dart

== See also ==
- Rocket artillery
- List of rocket artillery
- Mattress (rocket)
- List of U.S. military vehicles by model number
