= 45 cm naval rocket =

Rocket artillery used by Japan in WWII

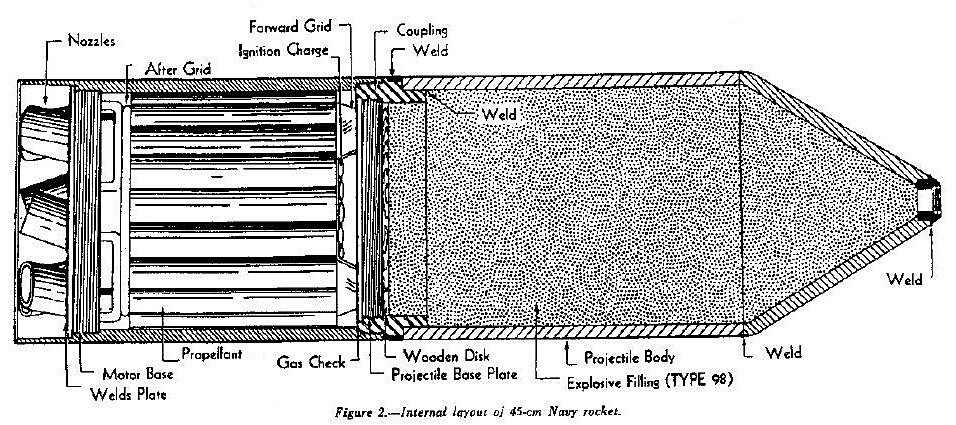
- Schematic of components
- Type: Rocket artillery
- Place of origin: Empire of Japan

Service history
- In service: World War II
- Used by: Imperial Japanese Navy

Production history
- Designed: 1944

Specifications
- Length: 1.7 m (5.6 ft)
- Shell weight: 682 kg (1,504 lb)
- Caliber: 45 cm (18 in)
- Carriage: Two wheeled
- Elevation: +5° to +50°
- Muzzle velocity: 151 m/s (495 ft/s)
- Maximum firing range: 5 km (3.1 mi)
- Filling: Trinitroanisole
- Filling weight: 180 kg (400 lb)
- Detonation mechanism: Nose fuze

The 45 cm naval rocket was a rocket artillery system used by garrison troops of the Imperial Japanese Navy during the late stages of World War II in defense of island bases in the Pacific.

During 1944 an unknown number of 45 cm naval rockets were transported to Luzon via the Battleship Ise along with Imperial Japanese Navy Commander Hanamizu, who was in charge of Japanese Navy rocket development. Overall production of the 45 cm naval rocket appears to have been limited, with the Japanese Navy largely focusing on more practical 20cm rocket systems.

== Design ==
The 45 cm naval rocket was first discovered during the Battle of Luzon. It was a spin-stabilized rocket that was filled with 39 sticks of solid propellant weighing 59 kg (130 lb) and the exhaust gasses were forced through six venturis that were angled at 18° to impart spin. The total weight of the rocket motor was 258 kg (569 lb).

The body of the motor, warhead and nose cone were all made from 19 mm (.75 in) rolled steel and were welded together. The warhead contained 180 kg (400 lb) of trinitroanisole and in the center of the nose cone, there was a pocket that could house either a Navy nose fuze as used by the 20 cm naval rocket or Army mortar fuze.

The launcher was a two-wheeled wooden cart with a metal baseplate that held the base of the rocket. The rocket was launched by pulling a lanyard which tripped a spring powered hammer at the bottom left of the launcher which set off a percussion cap which started the rocket motor. The launcher could only be used once because the force of the launch destroyed the launcher.

The first captured rocket was tested in Manila and although launched successfully at a 43° angle the rocket started wobbling during the latter half of its flight and only reached a range of 2 km (1.2 mi). Four more rockets were later tested at Aberdeen Maryland proving grounds and they were able to reach 5 km (3.1 mi). The rockets created a crater 2.7 m (9 ft) deep and 6.1 m (20 ft) in diameter with flaming debris scattered up to 317 m (347 yd) from the point of impact. However, the accuracy of the rocket was said to be poor so they couldn't be fired at a specific target but were instead fired towards a target and may have been more useful as a siege weapon.

== Gallery ==
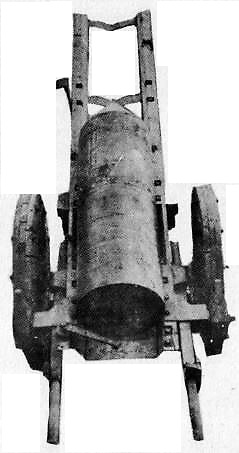
45 cm naval rocket launcher

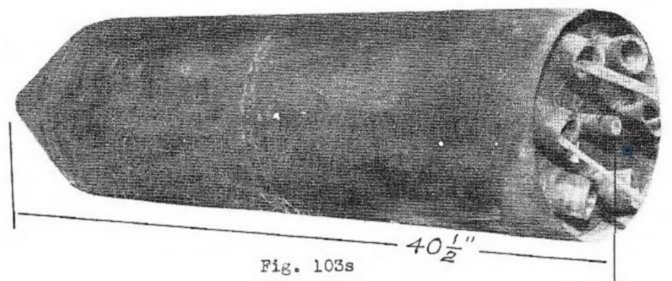
Captured 45 cm Naval Rocket. Note the venturi tubes

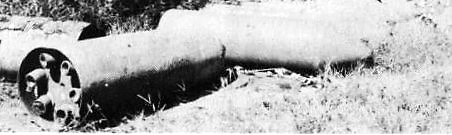
Captured 45 cm naval rockets
