= Type 21 and Type 22 rocket-bombs =

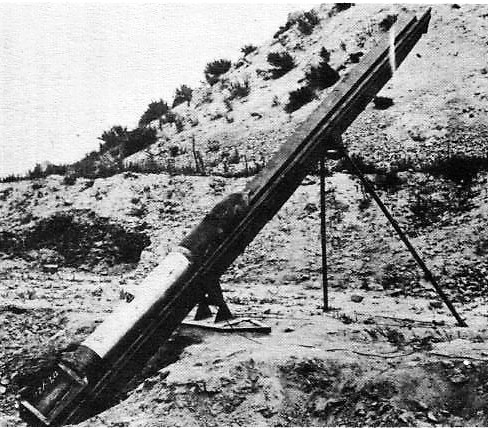
- A Type 21/Type 22 launcher
- Type: Rocket artillery
- Place of origin: Empire of Japan

Service history
- In service: World War II
- Used by: Imperial Japanese Navy

Production history
- Designed: 1944

Specifications
- Length: Launcher: 6.9 m (22 ft 8 in)
- Barrel length: Overall: 2.98 m (9 ft 9 in); Motor: 1.98 m (6 ft 6 in); Warhead: 1 m (3 ft 3 in)
- Shell: Type 98 No.25 land bomb Type 99 No.25 ordinary bomb model 1
- Shell weight: Overall: 420–440 kg (920–970 lb); Motor: 190 kg (420 lb); Warhead: See table
- Caliber: 30 cm (12 in)
- Effective firing range: 6.9 km (4.3 mi)
- Maximum firing range: 10 km (6.2 mi)
- Detonation mechanism: Nose fuze

The Type 21 and Type 22 rocket-bombs were rocket artillery systems used by garrison troops of the Imperial Japanese Navy during the late stages of World War II in defense of island bases in the Pacific.

== Design ==
Instead of being a purpose-built artillery rocket the Type 21 and Type 22 rocket-bombs were a conversion of either a navy 250 kg (550 lb) Type 98 No.25 land bomb or Type 99 No.25 ordinary bomb model 1 bomb that had their tail cones removed and were fitted with solid-propellant rocket boosters. According to Japanese documentation, the combination of rocket booster plus a Type 98 bomb was designated Type 21 and the combination of a rocket booster plus a Type 99 bomb was designated Type 22. Details on the Type 21/Type 22 were gathered from Japanese technical documents and analysis of a dud that was found during the war.

The rocket booster was similar to the smaller Type 10 and 3, in that the rocket booster consisted of an adapter plate, propellant chamber, butt plate, tail cone, braced tail fins, and a single venturi. However, with the Type 21/Type 22, the rocket motor is attached to the bomb with a different adapter plate for each type of bomb and the motor does not drop away when it burns out. An adapter sleeve fits into the tail of the warhead and the forward end of the rocket motor and was riveted around the circumference joining the two. In the center of the nose cap, there was a socket for a blasting cap that was electrically ignited by an umbilical cord that attached to the booster through a hole in the adapter sleeve.

Type 21/Type 22 rocket-bombs were launched from crude V-cross-sectioned metal troughs similar to those used for the 19 cm rocket motors, but with the sides flared outwards. These launchers could be laid against earthen embankments or mounted on bipods. There were rumors of a truck-mounted version, but no example of this system was found. Captured Japanese documentation claims the bombs were capable of a range of 10 km (6.2 mi), but tests showed a range of only 6.9 km (4.3 mi). Attacks by this rocket can be easily recognized by a distinctive "bubble whistle" sound in flight. The accuracy of the rocket is said to be poor and the flight path is erratic and susceptible to crosswinds. It was not a weapon that could be aimed at a specific target, but was instead fired towards a target, and may have been more useful as a siege weapon.

== Bombs ==
Two different types of bombs, whose weights without their tail cones is not known, were converted to create the Type 21/Type 22; the weight of the rocket bombs is an estimate only. The Type 98 No.25 land bomb was a thin-cased high explosive bomb for land targets while the Type 99 No.25 ordinary bomb model 1 was an armor-piercing bomb for use against warships.

Designation	Body length	Diameter	Weight	Explosive weight	Explosive to weight ratio	Explosive type
Type 98 No.25 land bomb	99 cm (3 ft 3 in)	30 cm (1 ft)	241 kg (532 lb)	96 kg (211 lb)	40%	Picric acid
Type 99 No.25 ordinary bomb model 1	99 cm (3 ft 3 in)	29 cm (11.5 in)	250 kg (550 lb)	60 kg (132 lb)	24%	Trinitroanisole

== Gallery ==
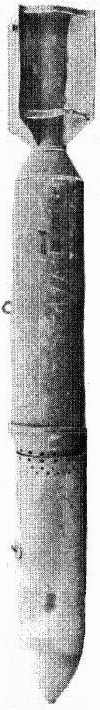
A photo of the dud that was analyzed

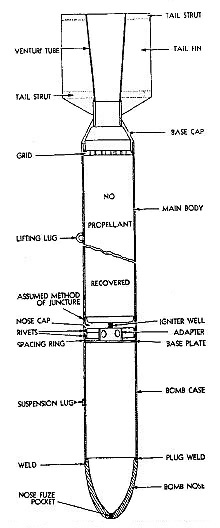
Type 22 rocket-bomb components

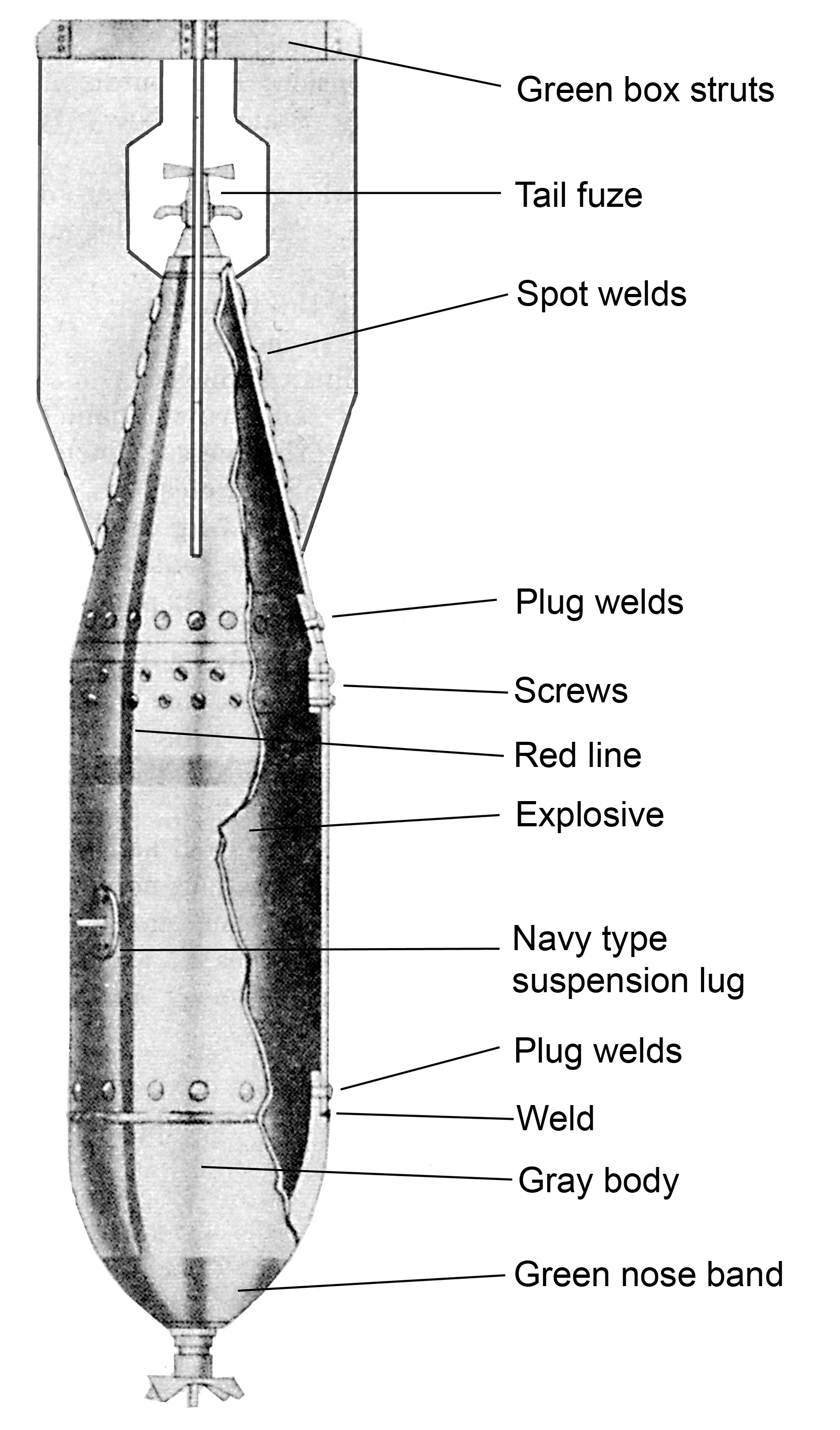
A schematic of the IJN Type 98 No.25 land bomb

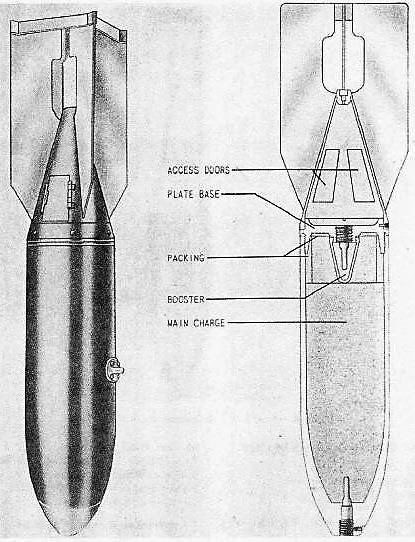
A schematic of the IJN Type 99 No.25 ordinary bomb model 1
