= NDL-40 =

Indonesian Towed Multiple Rocket Launcher

NDL-40 3D modeling

NDL-40 (also called LAU 97) is a towed multiple rocket launcher developed and produced by IPTN (now PTDI) of Indonesia. The weapon system used 70mm (2.75 inch) rockets as projectile. The rocket used is produced by IPTN under license from Belgium.

The system can fire 40 rockets from launcher tubes in a single, ripple, or salvo modes with an interval of 0.1 to 9.9 seconds for each rocket. The system is capable of devastating an area of 200 m × 300 m (660 ft × 980 ft) in a salvo. Maximum range is only about 6 km (3.7 mi) for rockets with MK-40 motor, but can be increased to 8 km (5.0 mi) by using rockets with FZ-68 motor.

== Operator ==
- (Indonesia) - Indonesian Army: 50 units of NDL-40/A

== See also ==
- Type 63 MRL
- List of rocket artillery
