= Type 4 20 cm rocket launcher =

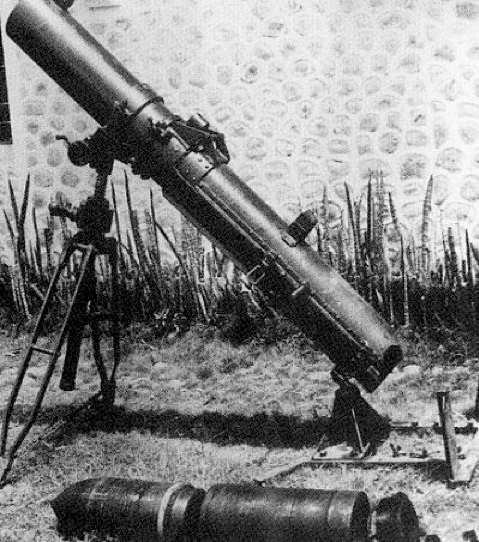
- A launcher and rocket. The baseplate is incorrectly positioned, extending backwards. It should face forward in order not to get damaged during firing.
- Type: Rocket artillery
- Place of origin: Empire of Japan

Service history
- In service: 1944–1945
- Used by: See users
- Wars: World War II

Production history
- Designer: 1st Army Laboratory
- Designed: 1943
- Manufacturer: Osaka Arsenal
- Produced: 1944–1945
- No. built: 9,800 rockets and about 1,800 launchers

Specifications
- Mass: 227 kg (500 lb)
- Barrel length: 1,830 mm (72 in)
- Crew: 10
- Caliber: 202 mm (8.0 in)
- Rate of fire: 1–2 rpm
- Muzzle velocity: 175 m/s (570 ft/s)
- Maximum firing range: 2,500 m (8,200 ft)
- Filling: TNT
- Filling weight: 16.5 kg (36 lb)

The Type 4 20 cm rocket mortar (四式二十糎噴進砲, Yonshiki nijū-senchi funshinhō) was a 203 mm rocket mortar used by the Imperial Japanese Army in the final stages of World War II.

== Development and design ==
During World War II there was considerable infighting between the Imperial Japanese Army and the Imperial Japanese Navy as both competed for scarce resources. A consequence of this competition is that each produced similar but different weapons. An example of this competition was the Army Type 4 20 cm rocket launcher and the 20 cm Naval Rocket Launcher.

The Type 4 20 cm rocket launcher resembled a conventional mortar, but the barrel had no breech. In order to load the launcher, the lower part of the barrel was lifted open. It was operated by a crew of ten men, 4 of which acted as ammunition carriers. Unlike conventional rocket artillery, the Type 4 was used as a mortar instead of saturation fire. It had a sustained rate of fire of 1–2 rockets per minute. The Type 4 warhead had a TNT filling while Ballistite was used as propellant, whose exhaust gasses were forced through six venturis drilled in the base of the rocket which spin-stabilized the projectile. The rocket also used a friction igniter, which dispensed the need of using batteries in the field. It shared fuzes with the Type 100 mortar round which could be either be set for instantaneous or time-delay action.

Although the weapon came with a standard mortar tube with tripod mounting, if necessary, the rocket-propelled round could be launched from an ordinary pipe or culvert with sufficient diameter, wooden rails, or even directly from a slope in the ground.

Studies conducted by the United States Technical Intelligence concluded that the Type 4 20 cm rocket mortar was a "simple, sturdy, mobile device, capable of fine adjustment for accurate fire." While the rocket produced no smoke, it did kick up a cloud of dust during launch and enemy soldiers could hear the approaching rockets in flight.

== Operational history ==
The first units were deployed in 1944, and were used in combat during the Battle of Luzon with the 3rd Rocket Artillery Battalion. Large numbers of Type 4 rockets were kept for use during the projected Allied invasion of the Japanese home islands. According to Ness, 2,900 rockets were delivered by the end of 1944, while another 6,900 were delivered the next year. Production of launchers was estimated at somewhat less than 1,800 units.

According to US Technical Intelligence reports, some rockets were captured in Luzon and subsequently used to a limited degree against their former owners.

== Specifications ==
Type 4 20 cm rocket
Length	Weight	Range	Filling weight	Source
940 mm (37 in)	82 kg (180 lb)	2,700 m (3,000 yd)	N/A	
984 mm (38.7 in)	90.8–92.6 kg (200–204 lb)	2,700 m (3,000 yd)	16.2 kg (36 lb)	
980 mm (39 in)	92 kg (203 lb)	2,500 m (8,200 ft)	16.5 kg (36 lb)	

== Users ==
- Japan − Used by the Imperial Japanese Army
- United States − Limited use of captured rockets in the Battle of Luzon

== Photo gallery ==
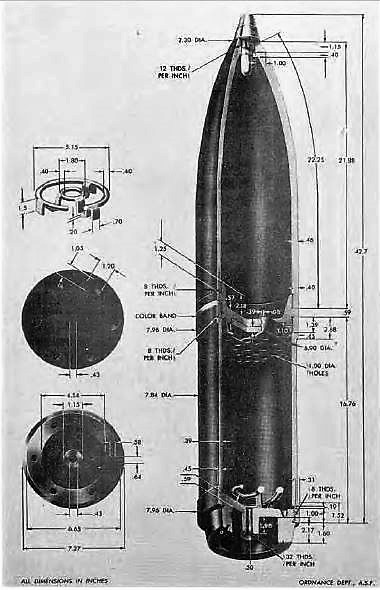
A schematic of rocket components.

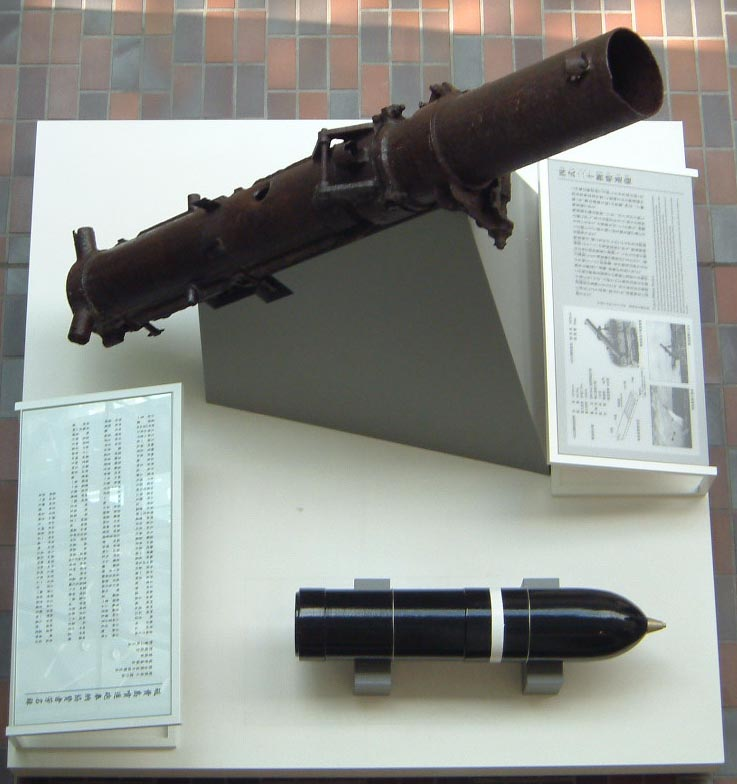
A Type 4 rocket launcher in the Yasukuni Shrine.

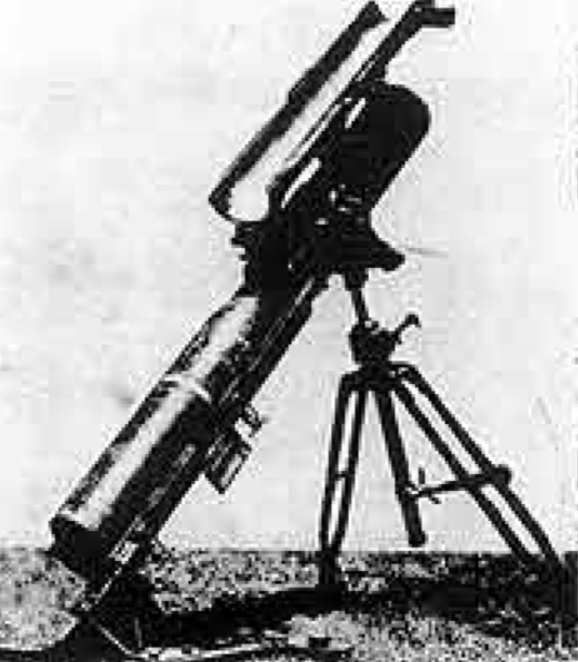
A Type 4 launcher opened for loading.

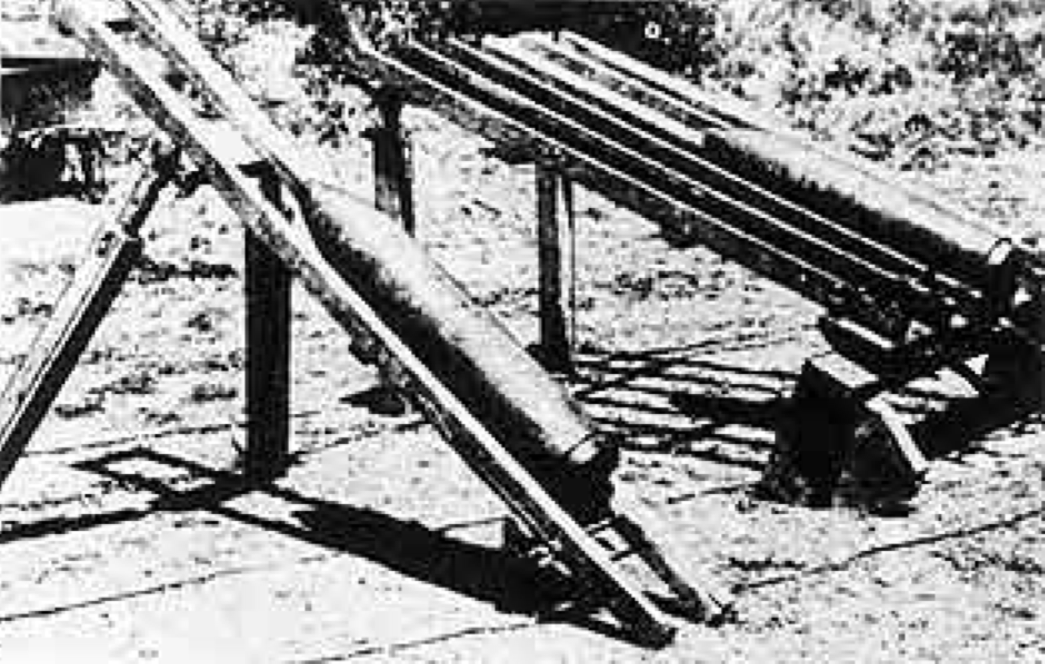
A Type 4 rocket on a launch ramp.
