= XM70 =

XM70 Towed Multiple Rocket Launch System
- Type: Rocket launcher
- Place of origin: United States

Production history
- Designer: Armor Research Foundation, Rock Island Arsenal & U.S. Marine Corps
- Manufacturer: Rock Island Arsenal
- Produced: 1959–63
- No. built: 7
- Variants: XM70, XM70E1, XM70E2

Specifications
- Caliber: 115 millimetres (4.5 in)
- Main armament: 115mm rockets, individually fired from a revolving magazine

The XM70 was a rocket launcher developed for the U.S. Marine Corps from 1959 to 1963 at Rock Island Arsenal, Illinois Research and Development Division. Seven prototypes were built and tested at Rock Island Arsenal and Aberdeen Proving Ground, Maryland. The Army intended to develop a self-propelled variant designated the XM71 as the core weapon system matured.

The XM70 was intended to be a combination weapon, combing elements of a mortar and a howitzer, with some referring to it as the "Moritzer". It was to be rifled, automatic, breech-loaded, and was also a six-shooter.

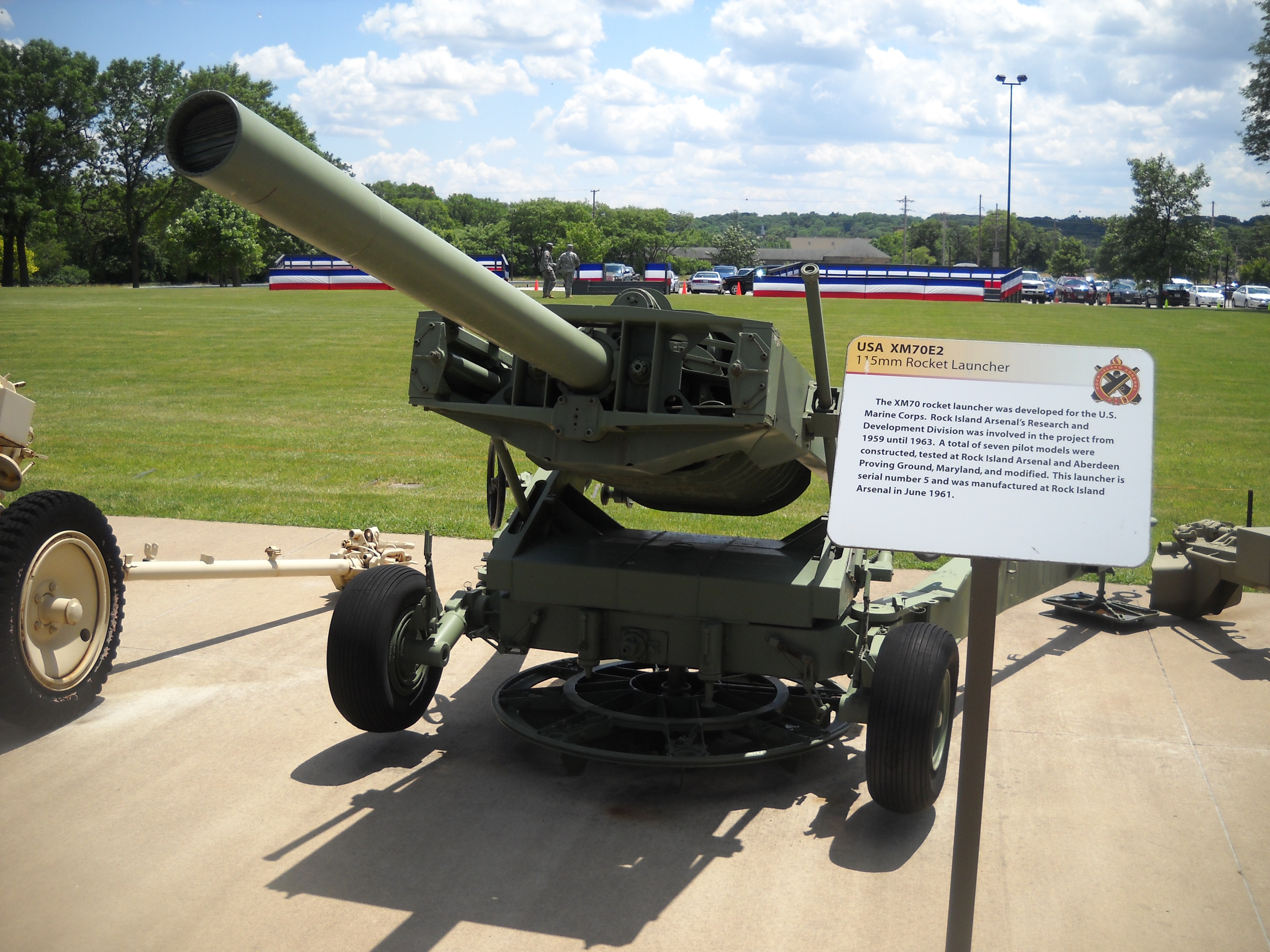
Front view of an XM70E2 towed rocket launcher

The XM70 has an unusual layout for a rocket launcher, borrowing most of its characteristics from towed howitzers. It used a closed breach and a hydraulic recoil mechanism rather than allowing rocket exhaust to exit the rear of the device, which allowed the crew to remain nearby to individually aim each rocket and to rapidly reload. It also had long trail arms and a base plate to pivot the system in common with conventional towed artillery.

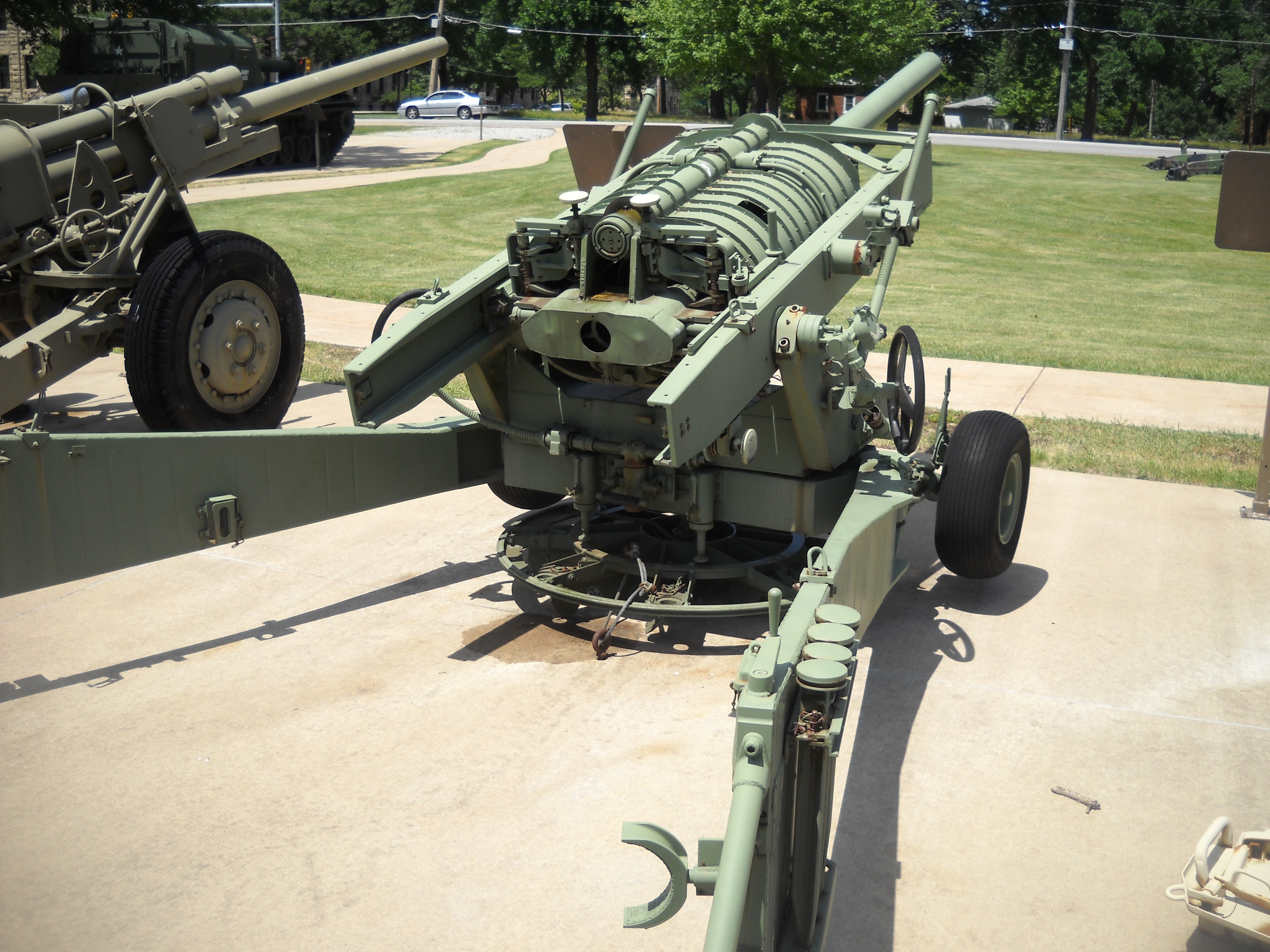
The rear view of the XM70E2 shows characteristics in common with towed howitzers

The XM70 employed a unique revolver-like rotary magazine to fire rockets through a single launch tube in succession, rather than individual tubes for each rocket with the intent of improving accuracy while maintaining low overall weight and mobility.

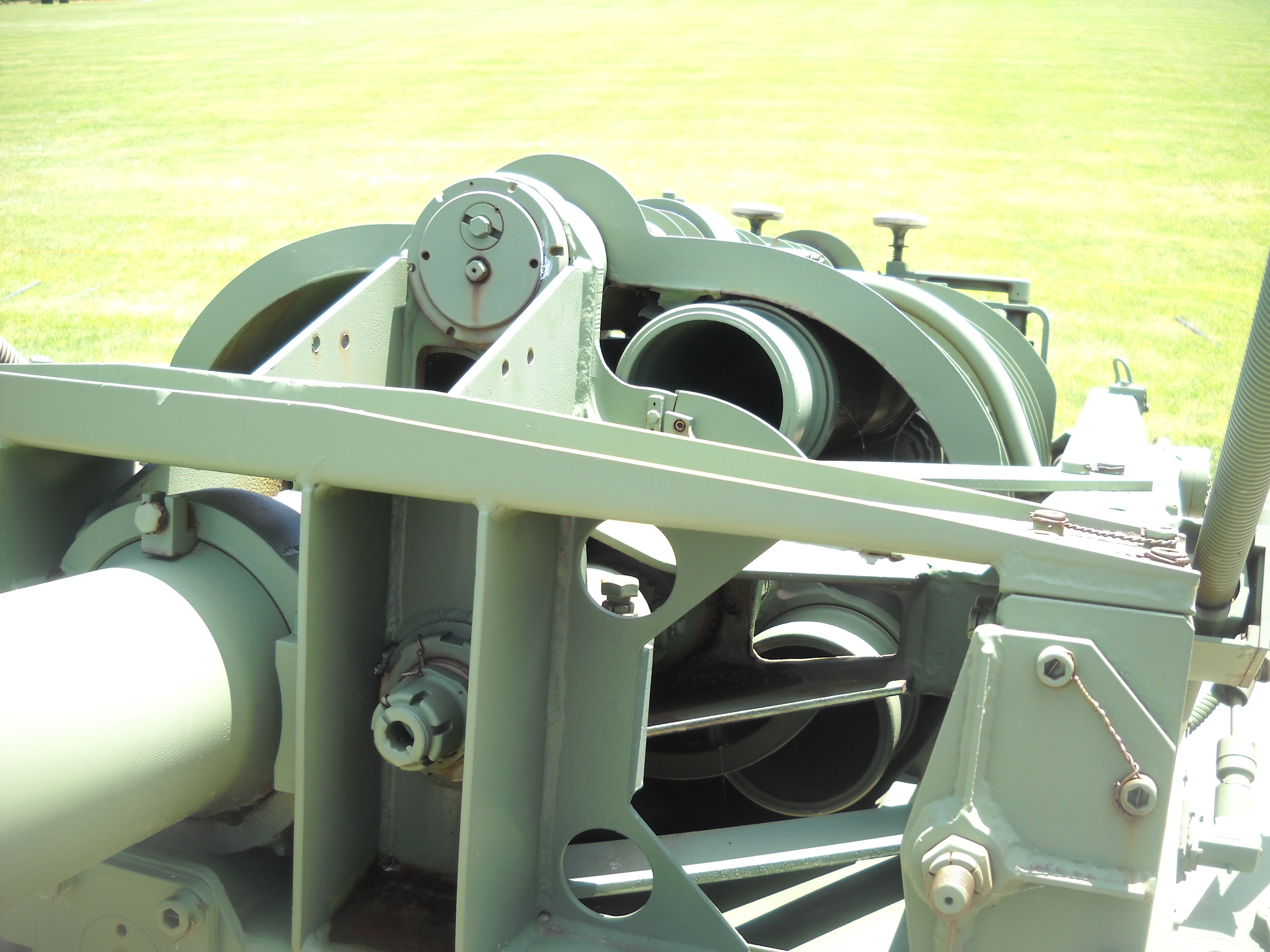
XM70E2 revolver magazine feeds rockets into the main launch tube

Most multiple launch rocket systems use individual smoothbore tubes roughly the same length of each fin-stabilized rocket bundled in parallel for firing in rapid barrages. The XM70's single shared long barrel has grooves indicative of rifling to spin the rocket to gyro stabilize it in flight to provide additional accuracy.

United States Patent US4353285 gives detailed technical explanation for Pacific Car and Foundry improvements.

== Variants ==
- XM70
- XM70E1 - prototypes #2 & #3 (#2 is in storage at the National Museum of the Marine Corps)
- XM70E2 - prototypes #4 & #5 (on display at the Rock Island Arsenal museum
- XM70E2 - prototype #6, produced by Pacific Car & Foundry with split trail
- XM70E2 - prototype #7, produced by Pacific Car & Foundry with box trail

== See also ==
- List of artillery
- List of rocket artillery
- List of howitzers
- List of artillery of the United States
