= 20 cm naval rocket launcher =

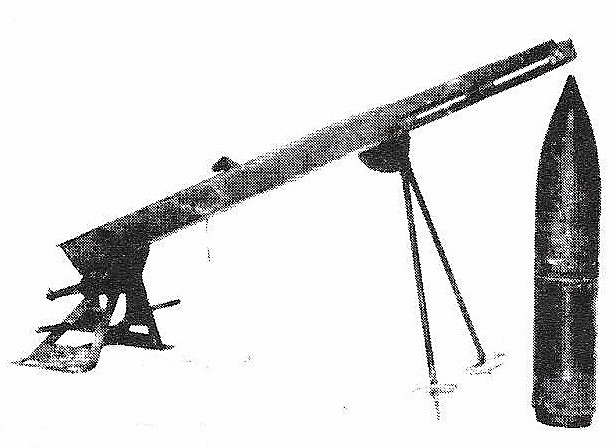
- Type: Rocket artillery
- Place of origin: Japan

Service history
- In service: 1943–1945
- Used by: Imperial Japanese Navy
- Wars: World War II

Specifications
- Mass: 79 kg (175 lb)
- Barrel length: 2.438 m (8 ft)
- Shell: 1.041 m (3 ft 5 in)
- Shell weight: Total: 90.12 kg (198 lb 11 oz); Explosive: 17.52 kg (38 lb 10 oz); Propellant: 8.3 kg (18 lb 5 oz)
- Caliber: 210 mm (8.3 in)
- Elevation: +5° to +60°
- Maximum firing range: 1.8 km (1.1 mi) at +50°

The 20 cm naval rocket launcher was a rocket artillery system used by the Imperial Japanese Navy in the final stages of World War II.

== Development and design ==
During World War II there was considerable infighting between the Imperial Japanese Army and the Imperial Japanese Navy as both competed for scarce resources. A consequence of this competition is that each produced similar but different weapons. An example of this competition was the Army Type 4 20 cm rocket launcher and the 20 cm naval rocket launcher.

The 20 cm naval rocket launcher was developed in the final stages of World War II by the Japanese Navy, as a low-cost, easy to produce weapon for use by naval troops as a last-ditch weapon for the defense of Japanese occupied islands. The first units were used successfully during the Battle of Peleliu in 1944.

The 20 cm naval rocket was a modification of a standard 203 mm (8 in) naval projectile by screwing a rocket booster to the projectile. The rocket was ignited by a percussion cap which screwed into the base of the projectile and the rocket consisted of 7 sticks of double base solid-propellant whose exhaust gasses were forced through six venturis drilled in the base of the rocket at a 25° angle which rotated the projectile in a clockwise direction imparting spin-stabilization. Type 91 trinitroanisole explosive was poured into a lacquered shell body intended to stop the formation of picrate salts and the projectile was centrifugally armed by a nose fuze.

=== Launchers ===
The rocket could be launched from a sheet metal or wooden launch trough with a bi-pod, placed against an earthen embankment, or from a pipe or culvert. They were usually employed in groups of two or three covering landing beaches and although cheap and portable traverse and elevation were slow and the projectile range was short.

A mobile rocket launcher was first found on Iwo Jima. It has a barrel about 6 ft (1.8 m) long and was mounted on a steel split trail carriage with two spades. There were two wooden spoked wheels with hard rubber tires for easy transport. Elevation and depression were by an elevating handle located at the left of the barrel just forward of the trunnions. When the desired angle was reached, the clamping handle at the left is rotated to lock the tube in position. The maximum elevation was 73° with no carriage traverse. A percussion type firing mechanism located on top of the breech is fired by an attached lanyard.

== Photo gallery ==
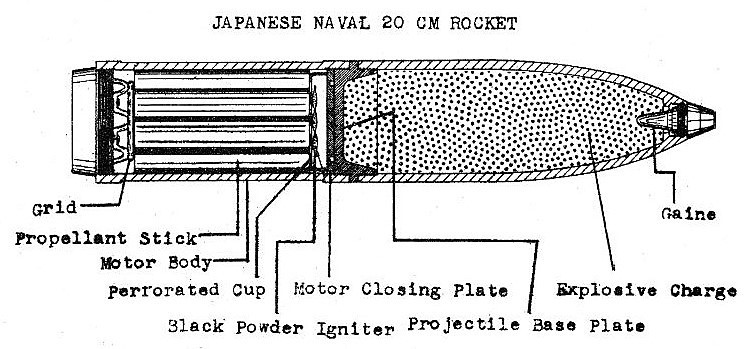
Schematic of 20 cm naval rocket components.

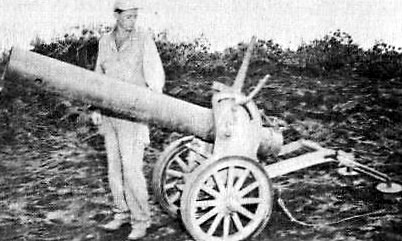
Mobile 20 cm naval rocket launcher.

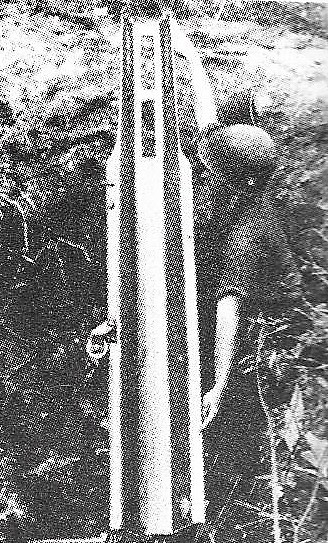
A wooden launch trough against an embankment.
