= Jobaria Defense Systems Multiple Cradle Launcher =

- Jahanam as seen in IDEX 2013.
- Type: Rocket artillery
- Place of origin: United Arab Emirates

Service history
- Used by: United Arab Emirates
- Wars: Yemeni Civil War (2015–present); Saudi Arabian-led intervention in Yemen

Production history
- Manufacturer: Al Jaber Land Systems

Specifications
- Crew: 3
- Caliber: 122/107 mm
- Barrels: 240
- Rate of fire: 2 rounds/sec
- Effective firing range: 16 km
- Maximum firing range: 37 km

The Jobaria Defense Systems Multiple Cradle Launcher, also called Jahanam Launcher (Arabic: الراجمة جهنم), is an Emirati made multiple rocket launcher unique to the United Arab Emirates Army. It has 240 tubes making it the world's largest rocket artillery by tube count. It is thought to function as a combined form of BM-21 Grad multiple rocket launcher. It is developed by a joint venture Al Jaber Land Systems.

== Design rationale ==
The United Arab Emirates Army made a request for a rocket artillery battery to be mounted on one vehicle, since the army previously used six vehicles and 30 soldiers, most likely BM-21 Grad, for this role. Due to the small number of military personnel of the United Arab Emirates Army, the Multiple Cradle Launcher has an advantage over the use of six vehicles which require a team of 30 men, whereas the Multiple Cradle Launcher only needs a team of three to operate and launching the same number of rockets (240). It has four rocket launchers attached to the trailer each carrying sixty 122mm rockets. The system fires ROKETSAN 122mm T-122 Sakarya rockets fitted with a high-explosive warhead that can be detonated by using either a point detonating fuze or by a proximity fuze. The operator of the system can choose how many and which pods he fires. All rockets can be fired in under two minutes, making the rate of fire 2 rounds per second.

After launching the rockets the system can relocate and continue firing rockets if it had not launched its entire payload or if it had, then be rearmed by a support vehicle in about 30 minutes. The support vehicle has two cranes each reloading two pods of the system.

== Variants ==
ROKETSAN also developed a Rocket Launcher, which fires both 107mm and 122mm rockets from the same Launcher, making it a Multi-Calibre, Multiple Rocket Launcher.

In February 2017, Al Jaber unveiled its Jobaria TCL (Twin Cradle Launcher) heavy rocket artillery system. Based on the Multiple Cradle Rocket Launcher, it fires 300 mm rockets from two four-rocket launchers; the system can fire either the Chinese A300 from 120–290 km (75–180 mi) or the Turkish T-300 Kasirga (Tiger) from 30–120 km (19–75 mi). The TCL has a reduced trailer length of 21 m (69 ft).

== Operators ==
- United Arab Emirates

== See also ==
- T-300 Kasırga
- Katyusha, BM-13, BM-8, and BM-31 multiple rocket launchers of World War II
- BM-14 140 mm multiple rocket launcher
- BM-27 Uragan 220 mm multiple rocket launcher
- BM-30 Smerch 300 mm multiple rocket launcher
- ASTROS II
