= Thunderbolt-2000 =

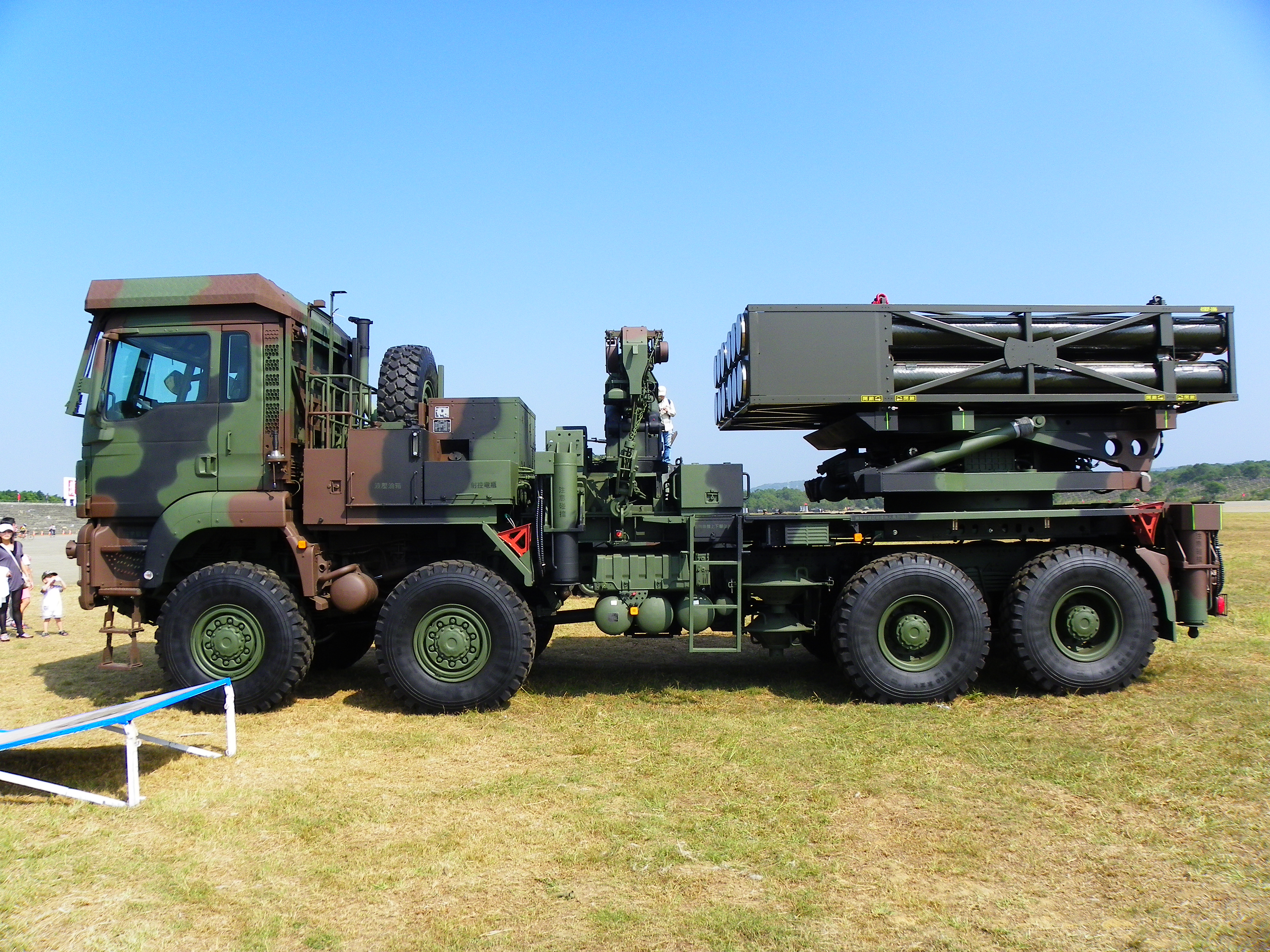
- Thunderbolt-2000 Mk-45
- Type: Rocket artillery
- Place of origin: Taiwan (Republic of China)

Production history
- Designer: National Chung-Shan Institute of Science and Technology (NCSIST)
- Manufacturer: NCSIST
- Produced: 1997 - Present

Specifications
- Shell: High explosive, Anti-personnel and Anti-Materiel dual-function cluster warhead or steel-ball shrapnel high-explosive warhead submunitions
- Caliber: 117 mm (MK15), 180mm (MK30), 227mm (MK45)
- Effective firing range: 15 km (MK15), 30 km (MK30), 45 km (MK45)

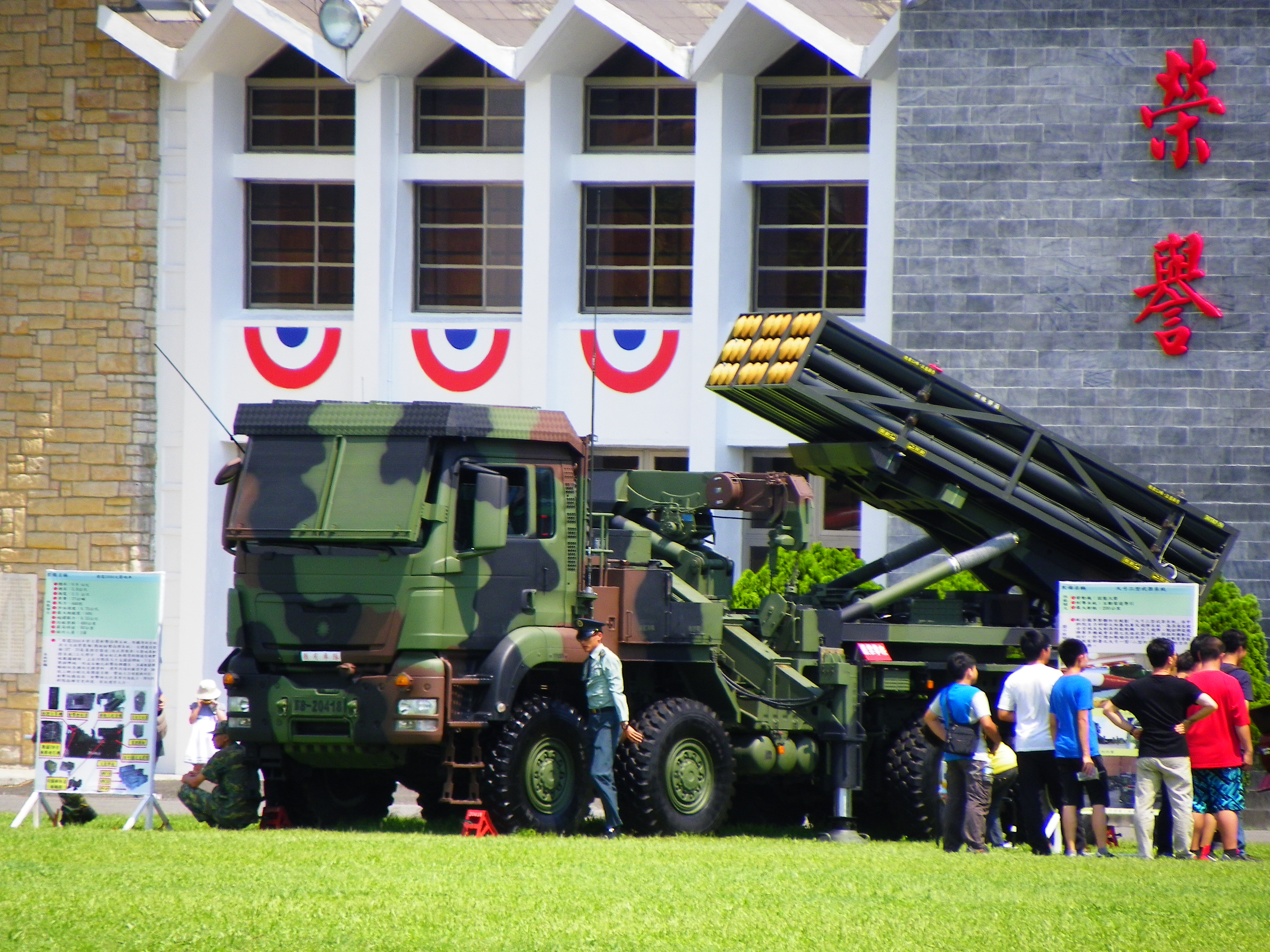
Thunderbolt 2000 MLRS Display at Military Academy Ground

The Thunderbolt-2000 (Chinese: 雷霆2000; pinyin: Léitíng 2000; RT/LT-2000) is a wheeled MLRS system produced by the National Chung-Shan Institute of Science and Technology (NCSIST). It is in service with the Republic of China armed forces and was created with the intention of attacking enemy forces when disembarking from sea.

== History ==
It had made its debut in 1997 when it appeared for the first time to the public during the Han Kuang Exercise. The platform is going to be MAN HX81 8×8 wheeled trucks, with 57 launchers and 54 ammo carriers/reloaders.

== Design ==
The prototype of the Thunderbolt-2000 weapon system was originally placed on the chassis of a M977 Heavy Expanded Mobility Tactical Truck. The production model utilises MAN HX81 8×8 wheeled trucks instead, with the first order batch including 57 launchers and 54 ammunition carriers/reloaders or local production of the same version. The LT-2000 was scheduled to enter service with all 3 main army groups in Taiwan from 2010, with each army group's artillery corps receiving 1 battalion of RT/LT-2000, featuring 3 companies/batteries with 6 RT/LT-2000 launchers each. The original CSIST LT-2000 prototype battery is in service with Kinmen Command, deployed there since mid-2000.

=== Munitions ===
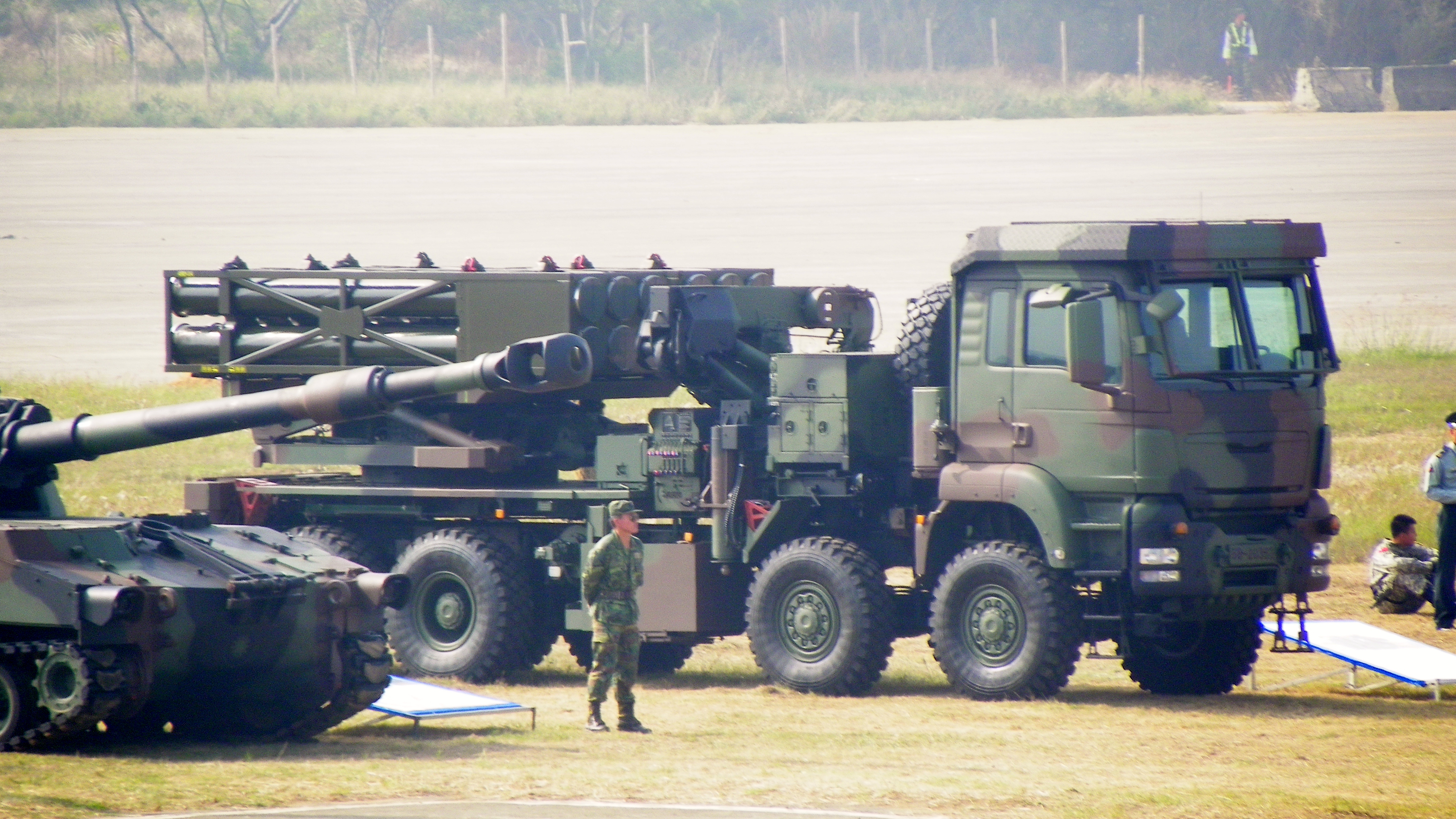
Thunderbolt-2000 at the Republic of China (Taiwan) Army Hukou base

The LT/RT-2000 uses three types of munitions: Mk15 (60 rounds, 3 pods of 20 round each, 15 km range), Mk30 (27 rounds, 3 pods of 9 rounds each, 30 km range) and Mk45 (12 rounds, 2 pods of 6 rounds each, 45 km range). While the Mk15 is the 117 mm rockets used by the Kung Feng VI that carries 6,400 6.4mm size steel balls, the Mk30 rocket is a bit larger than the Mk15 at 180mm caliber and can carry either 267 rounds of M77 Dual Purpose Improved Conventional Munitions (DPICM) bomblets or 18,300 8mm size steel balls with range of 30 km. And Mk45 larger than the Mk30 at 227mm caliber as it can carry either 518 rounds of M77 bomblets or 25,000 8mm steel balls with range of 45 km. Other types of munitions also being developed by CSIST/ROC (Taiwan) Army, including FAE bomblets.

=== Extended range munitions ===
Due to increasing threats NCSIST has developed more advanced versions of the original family of rockets with increased ranges. As of 2019 NCSIST had tested improved rockets to 63nmi and believed that even longer ranges were readily achievable. Testing of more advanced rockets began soon after. With a range of 200-300km the new munitions are able to reach China from Taiwan’s main island.

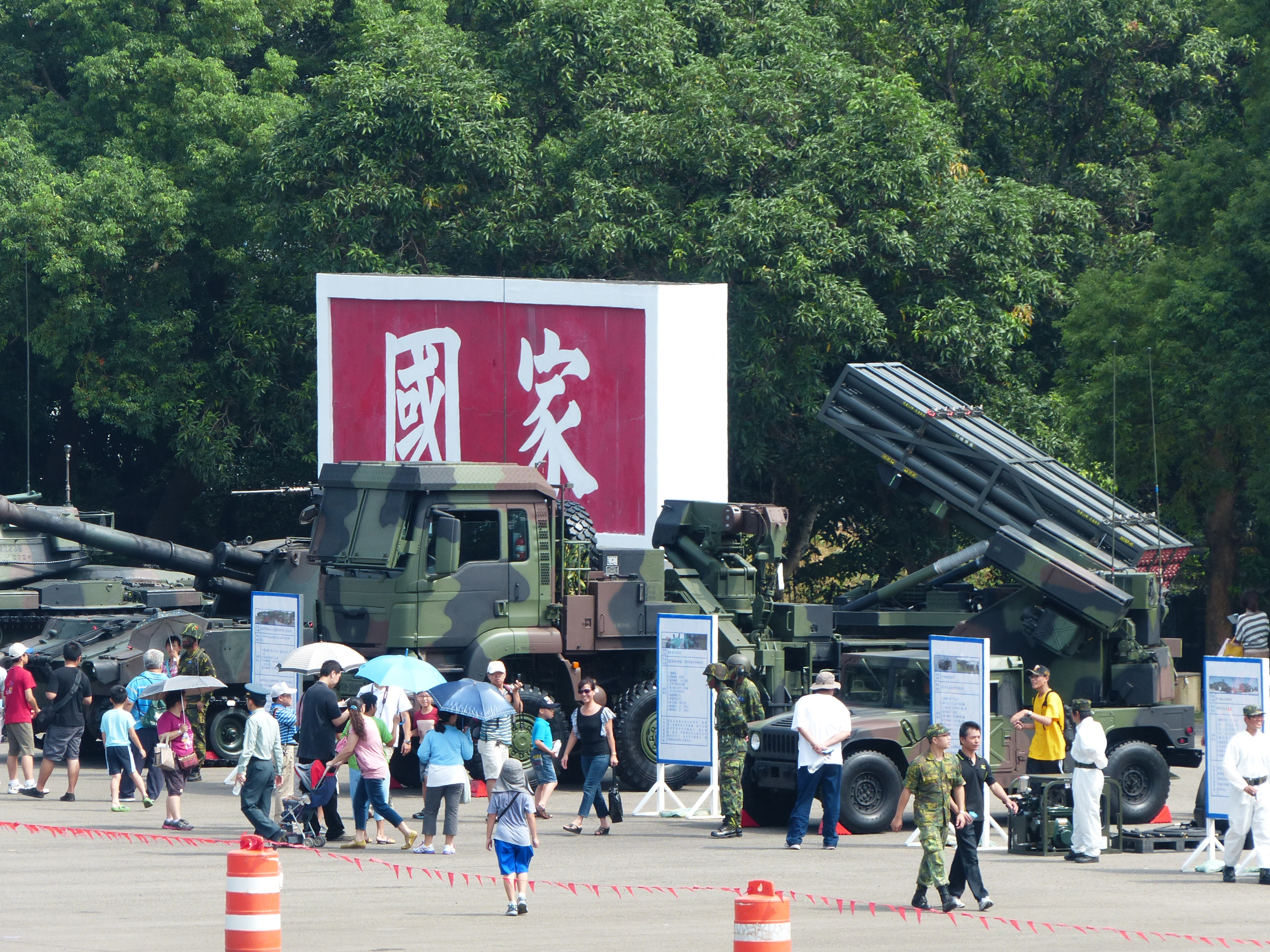
Thunderbolt-2000 MK15

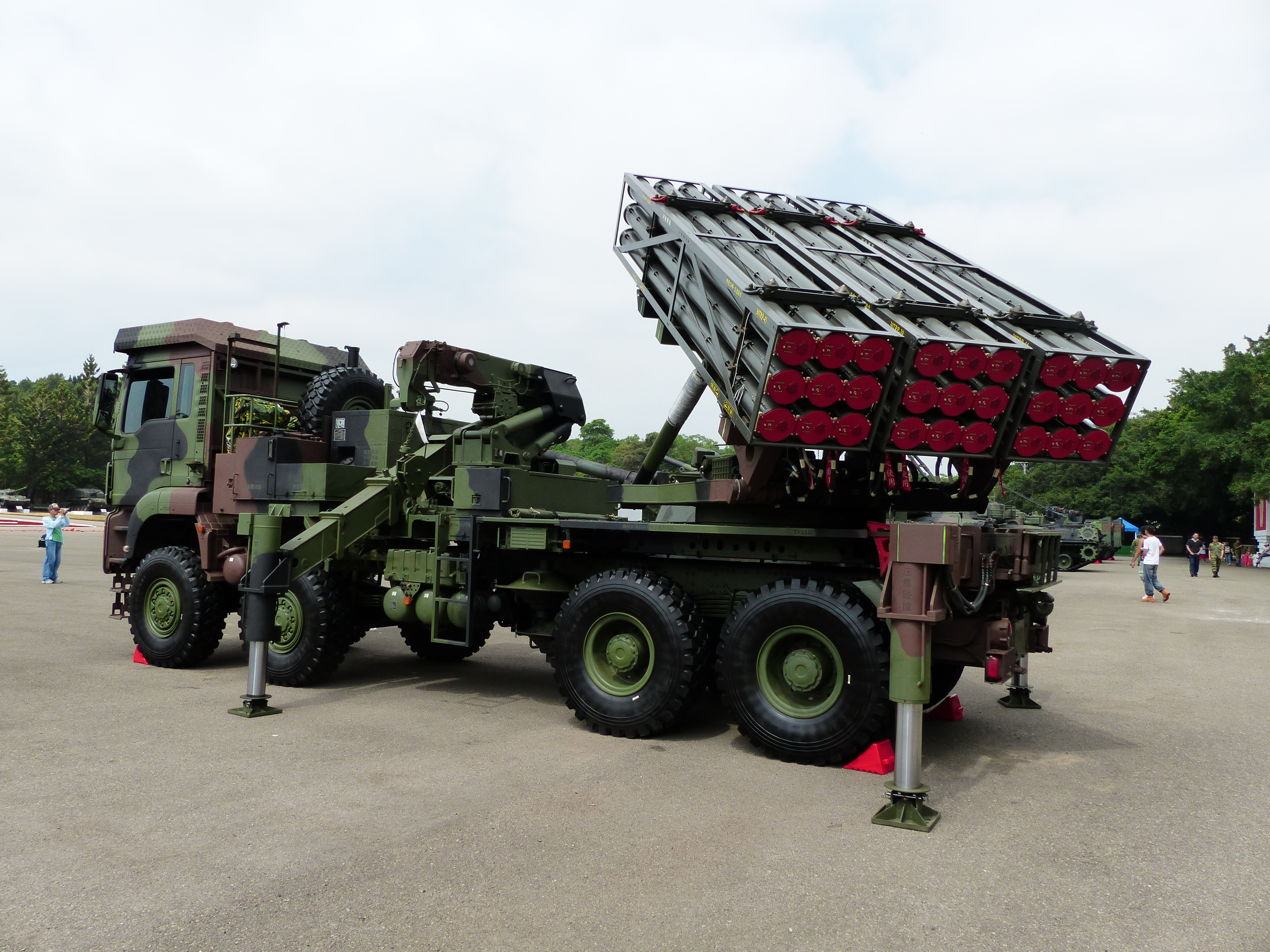
Thunderbolt-2000 MK30

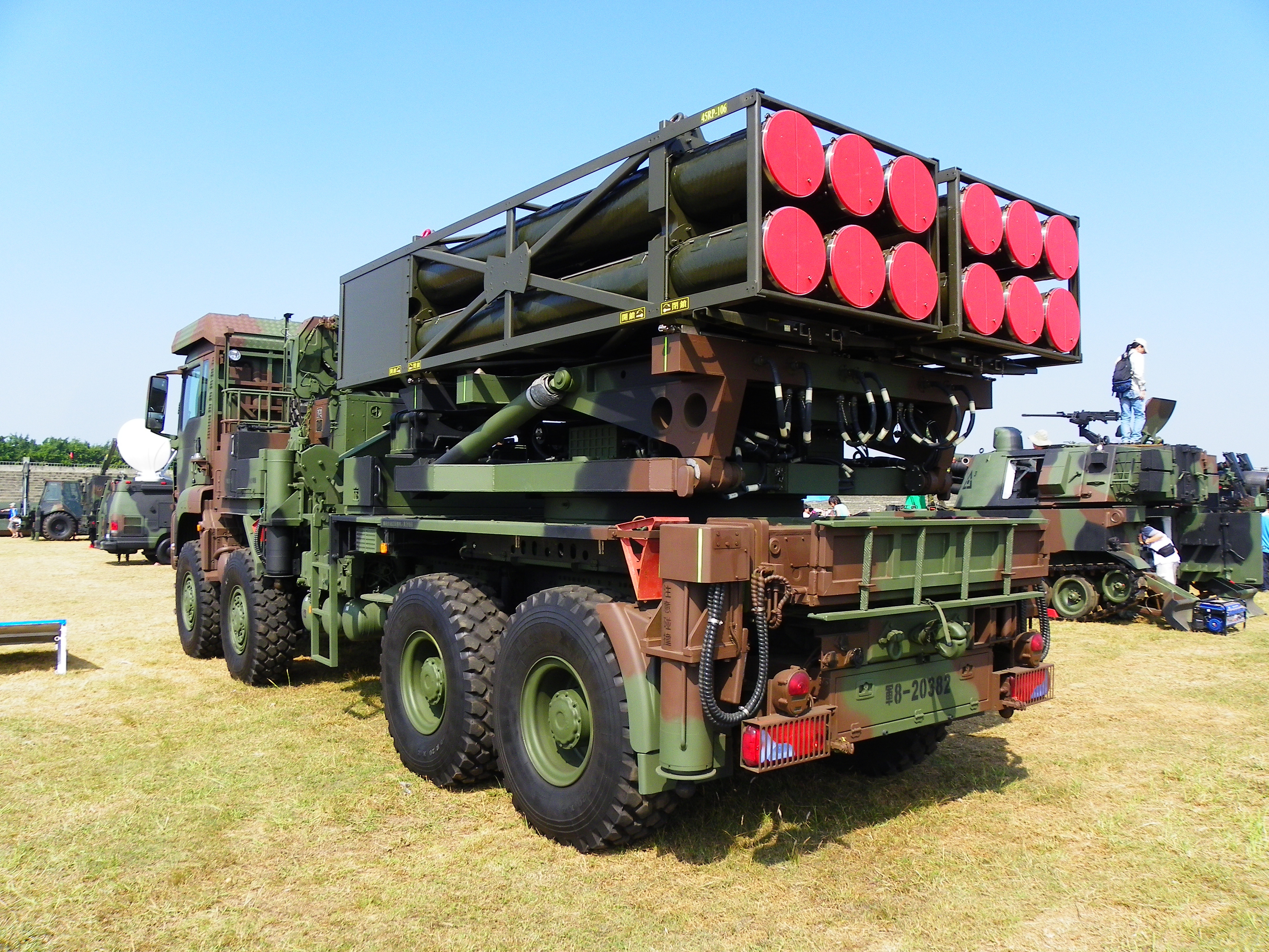
Thunderbolt-2000 MK45

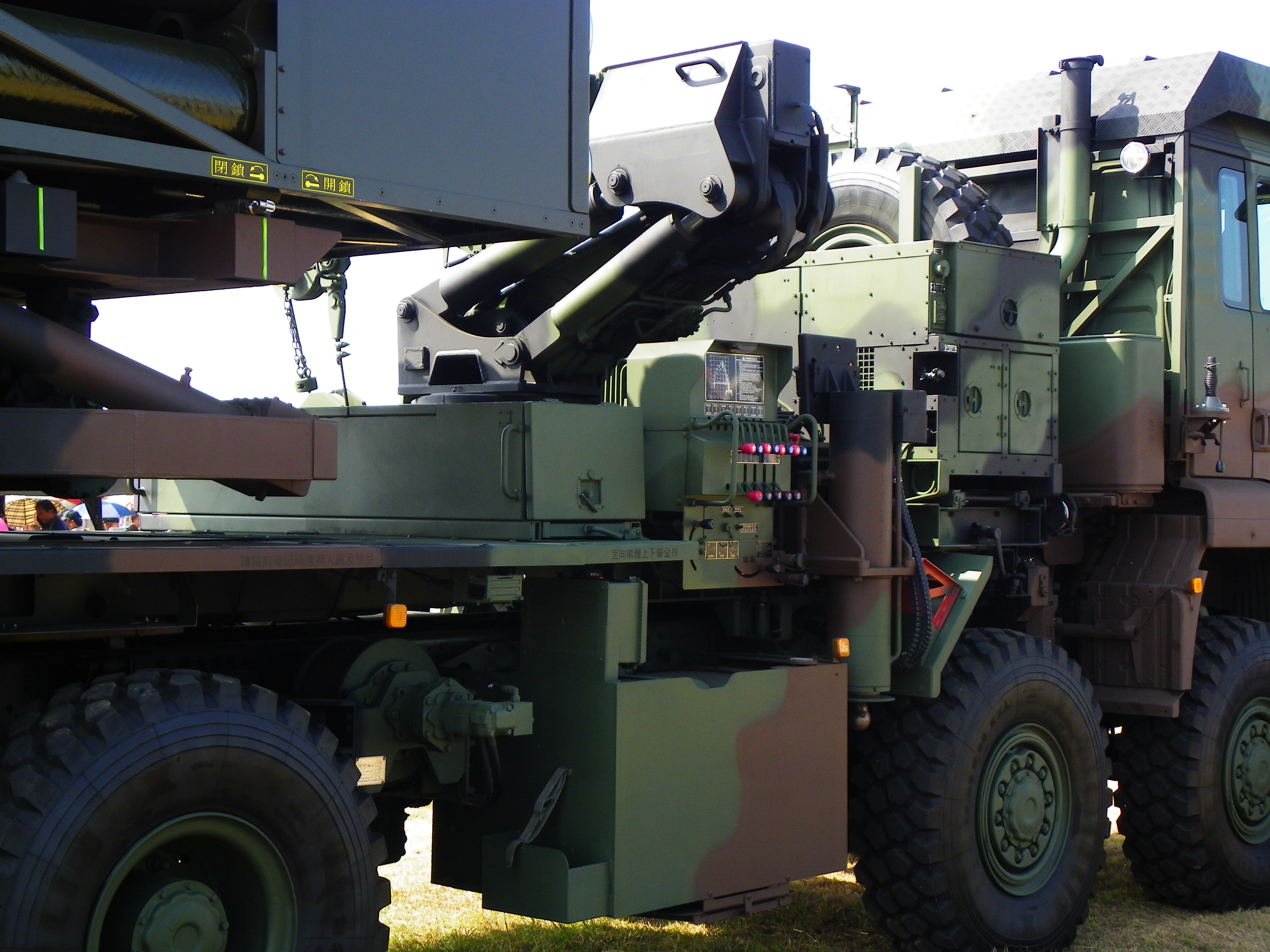
Thunderbolt-2000 Launch controller

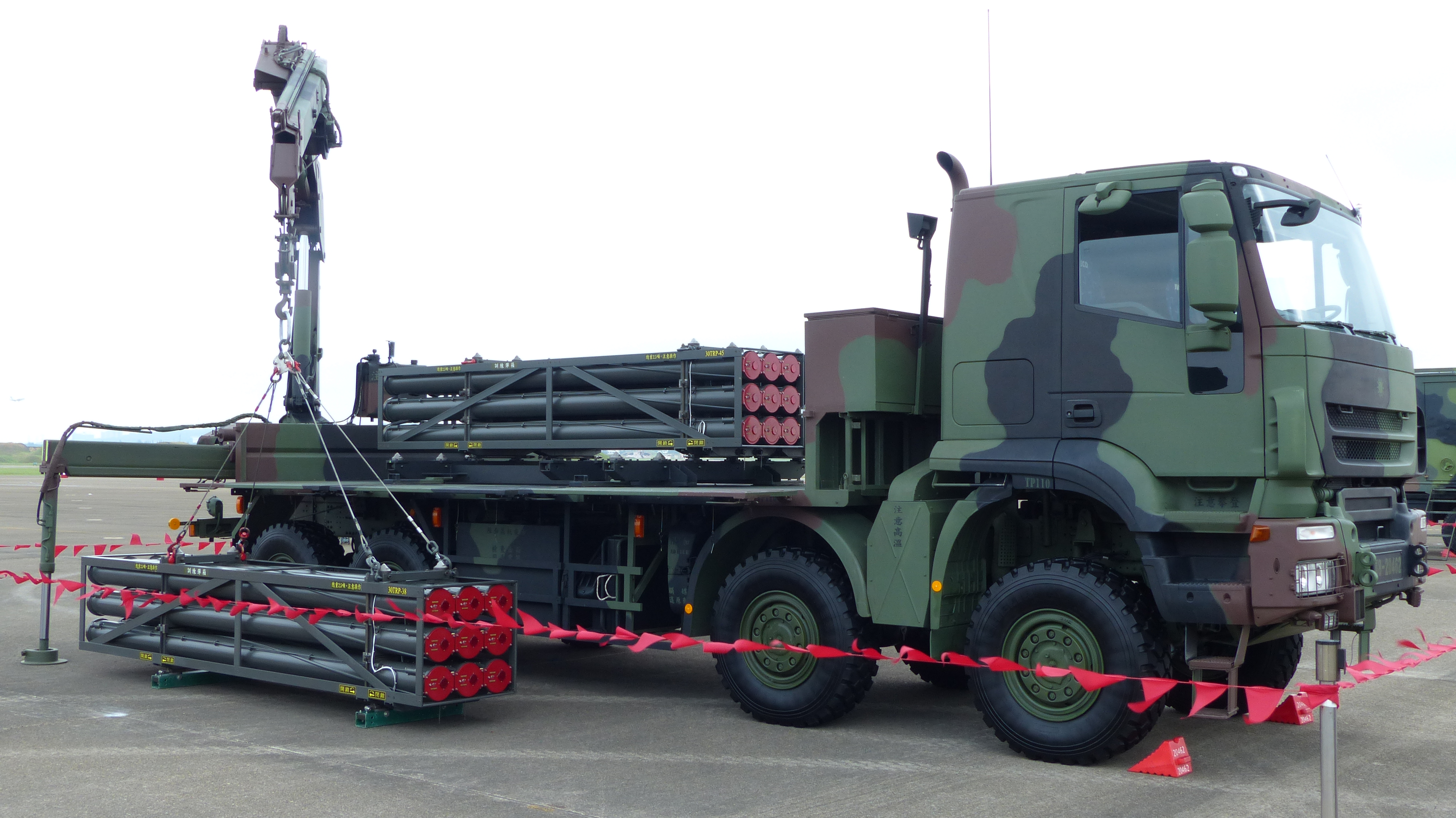
AT 8×8 Ammunition car
