= Type 10 and Type 3 rocket boosters =

WW2 Japanese rocket artillery

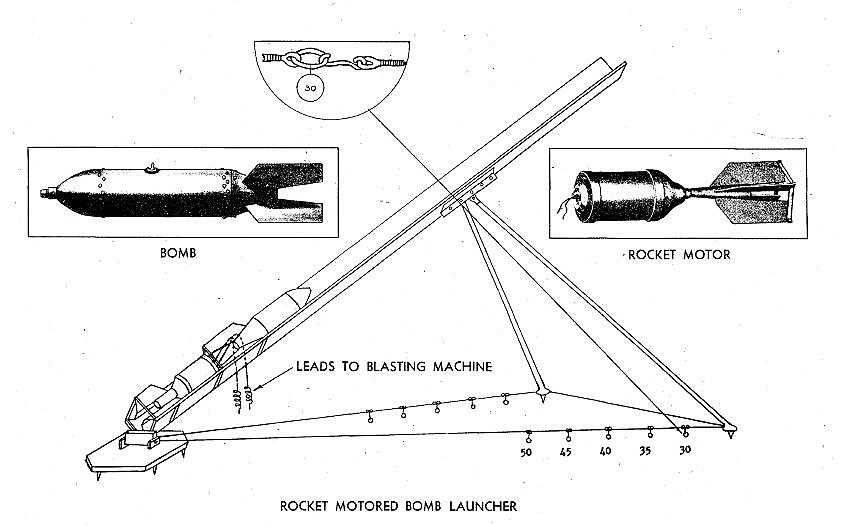
- Type 10 rocket booster, Type 97 bomb and bipod launcher.
- Type: Rocket artillery
- Place of origin: Empire of Japan

Service history
- In service: World War II
- Used by: Imperial Japanese Navy

Production history
- Designed: 1944

Specifications
- Length: Type 10 launcher: 19 ft 10 in (6 m)
- Elevation: +30° to +50°

The Type 10 and Type 3 rocket boosters were rocket artillery systems used by garrison troops of the Imperial Japanese Navy during the late stages of World War II in defense of island bases in the Pacific.

== Design ==
Instead of being a conventional piece of rocket artillery with motor and warhead enclosed within a body both types were detachable solid-propellant boosters that could be attached to a 56–63 kg (123–139 lb) Type 97 No.6 Land Bomb or Type 99 No.6 Ordinary Bomb. The bombs were launched from single wooden or metal inclined V-shaped troughs. These troughs could either be laid against earthen embankments or mounted on bipod or monopod launch frames. Elevation for the Type 10 could be varied by adjusting the guide wires on the base between +30° and +50°.

The rocket boosters consisted of a nose cone, propellant chamber, butt plate, tail fins, and a single venturi. The propellant chamber held three sticks of solid-propellant and was closed at the front by a nose cap. In the center of the nose cap, there was a socket for a blasting cap that was electrically ignited by an umbilical cord attached to the booster. The bombs and the booster were placed at the end of the trough and a wooden spacer was placed between the booster and the bomb. After a few seconds, the booster burnt out and dropped away while the bomb continued on its course. The Type 10's range was limited to 1,200 m (1,300 yd). There was also a slightly longer rocket booster, the Type 3, that had a range up to 1,800 m (2,000 yd) and accuracy for both was poor. They were not weapons that could be fired at a specific target but were instead fired towards a target. Due to its limited range, the launchers were vulnerable to counter-battery fire and their poor accuracy made them more useful in siege operations than in defense.

== Rocket Boosters ==
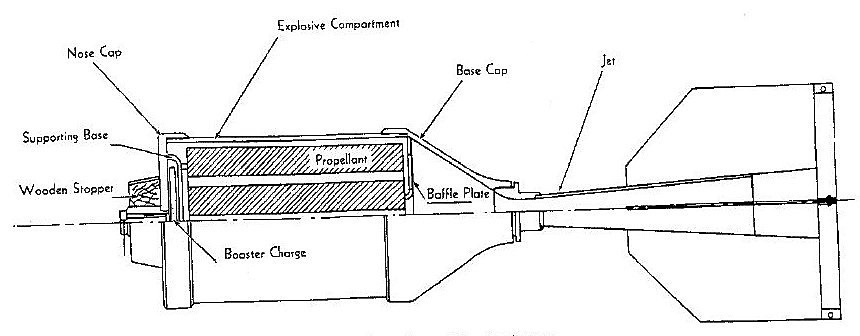
Type 10 rocket motor schematic.

Model	Length	Diameter	Propellant weight	Total weight
Type 10 (short)	2 ft 9 in (84 cm)	7.5 in (19 cm)	13 lb (5.9 kg)	40 lb (18 kg)
Type 3 (long)	3 ft 6 in (107 cm)	7.5 in (19 cm)	25 lb (11 kg)	92 lb (42 kg)

== Bombs ==
Since two different types of bombs and boosters were used the overall weight should be considered as approximate because the weight of each bomb without its tail cone is not known. Both the Type 97 No.6 Land Bomb or the Type 99 No.6 Ordinary Bomb could be used.

Designation	Body Length	Diameter	Weight	Explosive Weight	Explosive to Weight Ratio	Explosive Type
Type 97 No.6 Land Bomb	99 cm (3 ft 3 in)	20 cm (8 in)	56 kg (124 lb)	23 kg (50 lb)	40%	Picric acid
Type 99 No.6 Ordinary Bomb	107 cm (3 ft 6 in)	23 cm (9 in)	63 kg (138 lb)	32 kg (70 lb)	50%	Picric acid

== Photo gallery ==
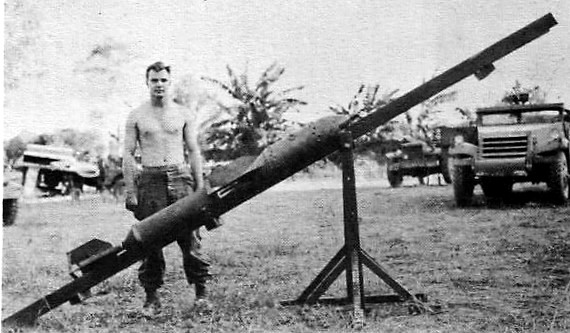
A captured monopod launcher.

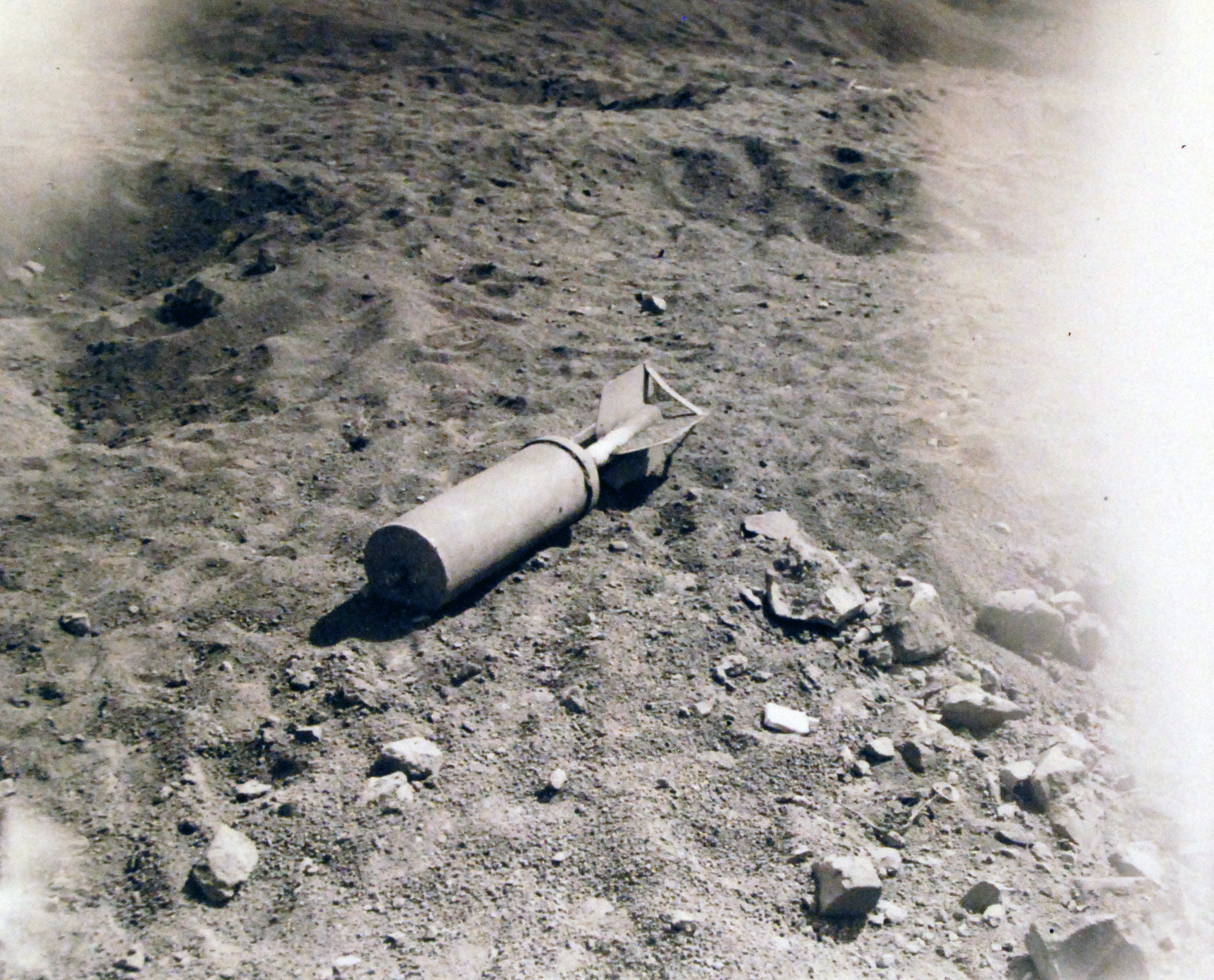
Two Type 10 rocket boosters found on Iwo Jima

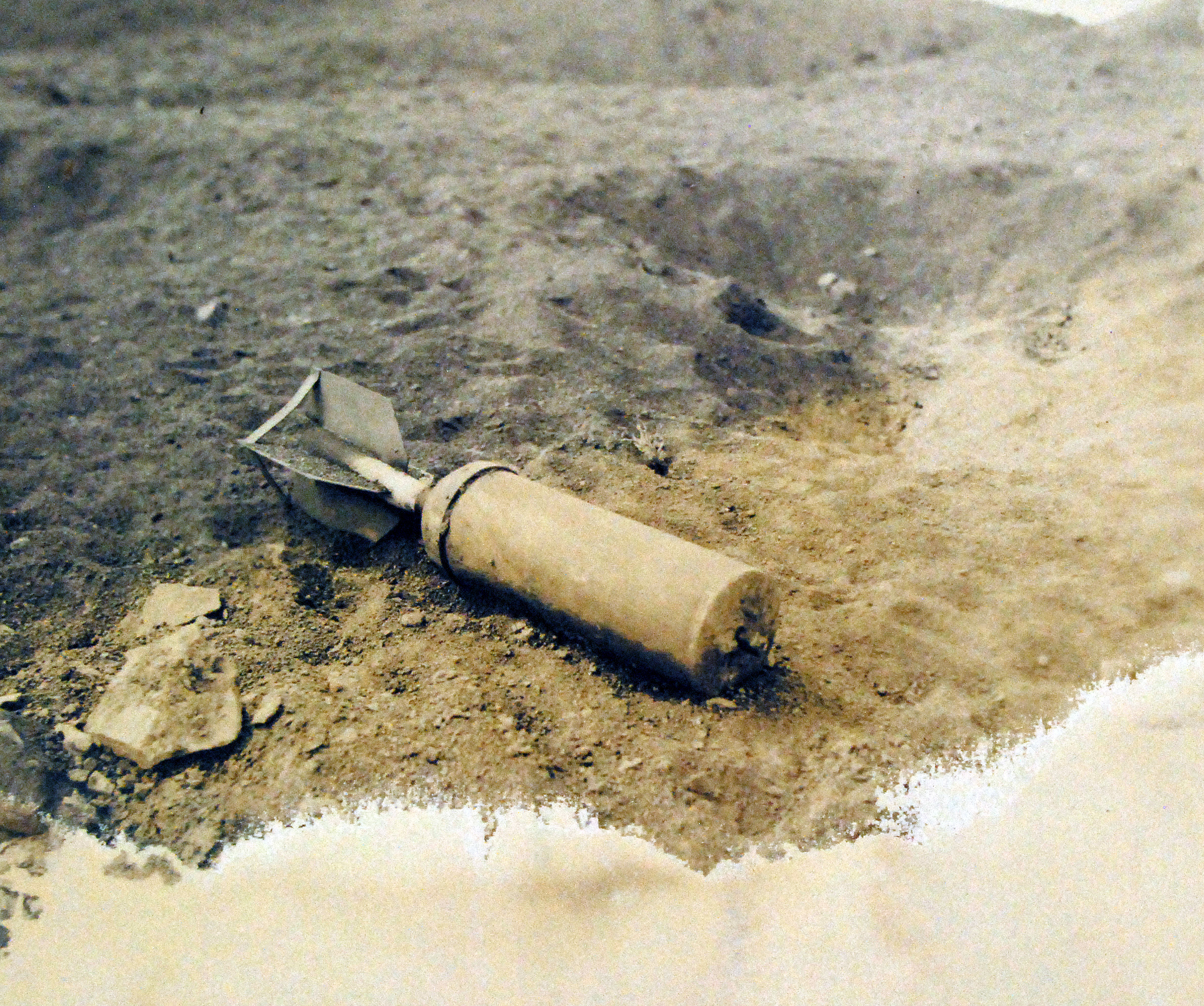

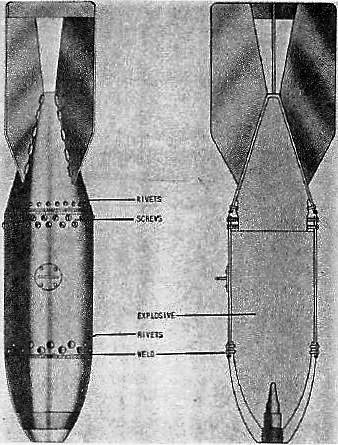
Type 97 No.6 Land Bomb

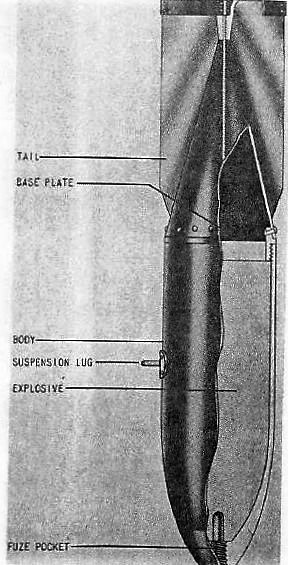
Type 99 No.6 Ordinary Bomb
