= Trinitroanisole =

Names
- Preferred IUPAC name 2-Methoxy-1,3,5-trinitrobenzene
- Other names 2,4,6-Trinitroanisol; picric acid methyl esther; trisol; trinol; trinitroanisole

Identifiers
CAS Number	606-35-9
3D model (JSmol)	Interactive image
ChemSpider	11324
ECHA InfoCard	100.149.212
EC Number	620-419-8
PubChem CID	11817
UNII	N042W5PE52
CompTox Dashboard (EPA)	DTXSID6060551
- InChI: InChI=1S/C7H5N3O7/c1-17-7-5(9(13)14)2-4(8(11)12)3-6(7)10(15)16/h2-3H,1H3 Key: FMXDVBRYDYFVGS-UHFFFAOYSA-N
- SMILES: COc1c([N+](=O)[O-])cc([N+](=O)[O-])cc1[N+](=O)[O-]

Properties
Chemical formula	C_{7}H_{5}N_{3}O_{7}
Molar mass	243.131 g·mol^{−1}
Appearance	yellow, "leaf-like" crystals
Density	1.61 g/cm^{3}
Melting point	68 °C (154 °F; 341 K)
Boiling point	explodes
Solubility in water	insoluble in water, soluble in diethyl ether and hot ethanol

Hazards
- Occupational safety and health (OHS/OSH)
Main hazards	explosive
- GHS labelling
Pictograms	(GHS01: Explosive) (GHS07: Exclamation mark) (GHS09: Environmental hazard)
Signal word	Danger
Hazard statements	H201, H302, H312, H332, H411
Precautionary statements	P210, P230, P240, P250, P261, P264, P270, P271, P273, P280, P301+P312, P302+P352, P304+P312, P304+P340, P312, P322, P330, P363, P370+P380, P372, P373, P391, P401, P501
- Except where otherwise noted, data are given for materials in their standard state (at 25 °C [77 °F], 100 kPa). verify (what is ?) Infobox references

Trinitroanisole is a chemical compound that exists as pale yellow crystals with a melting point of 68 °C. It is highly toxic. It is an explosive with a detonation velocity of 7200 meters per second. The compound's primary hazard is a blast of an instantaneous explosion, not flying projectiles or fragments.

== Synthesis ==
Trinitroanisole was first prepared in 1849 by the French chemist Auguste Cahours by reacting p-anisic acid (French: acide anisique) with a mixture of sulfuric acid and fuming nitric acid.

Trinitroanisole can be prepared by the reaction of 2,4-dinitrochlorobenzene with methanol in the presence of sodium hydroxide followed by the nitration of the resulting product. Alternatively, it can be prepared directly by the reaction of picryl chloride with methanol in the presence of sodium hydroxide.

== Use ==
Historically, trinitroanisole was used as a military explosive (e.g., Japanese Type 91 or German Trinol), having the advantage of being made from readily obtainable raw materials such as phenol. However, due to its toxicity and tendency to form picric acid and dangerous picrate salts, its use has largely been abandoned.

== See also ==
- 2,4-Dinitroanisole
