= List of New Brunswick case law =

Significant lawsuits of New Brunswick are described, if not elsewhere, here (in chronological order). Consolidations of statute law were published in 1854, 1877, 1903, 1927, 1952, and 1973. A useful "Index to the Private Acts of the Province of New Brunswick, 1929-2012" exists at the New Brunswick branch of the Canadian Bar Association. For early history, see the series published by the Carswell Company: Reports of Cases Determined by the Supreme Court of New Brunswick.

== Gesner v Cairns (1852) ==
Gesner maintained that Cairns trespassed the property leased by the former, felled trees on it, spoliated it and expropriated 1,000 tons of valuable material. Gesner maintained the material to be asphaltum, while Cairns was a coal miner. The defendant was evidently permitted to mine coal, not asphaltum. The evidence presented to the jury was of a technical nature and regarded the nature of the material. The defendant won the day.

== Maher v Town Council of Portland (1874) ==
Maher v Town Council of Portland tested the constitutional guarantees for denominational schools set out in section 93 of the British North America Act 1867. The issue was whether the Common Schools Act of 1871 infringed the guarantee of denominational schools set out in section 93(1).

== Dow v Black (1875) ==
Dow v Black was one of the first major cases examining in detail the division of powers between the federal Parliament and the provincial Legislatures, set out in s. 91 and s. 92 of the British North America Act 1867.

== The Caraquet Riots (1876) ==
The Caraquet Riots of 1875 stemmed from the Common Schools Act of 1871. The francophone Catholic clergy was hostile to the Act, which forbade religious instruction in New Brunswick schools. The local priest in Caraquet, Joseph Pelletier, and local representative to the Legislative Assembly, 31-year-old Théotime Blanchard, were responsible for the Catholic protest stratagem to withhold tax monies and to disregard local elections to the school board. In the British North American system of government, education and the school boards were purely a local concern, with the province supplementing locally determined budgets. Certain Protestants in Caraquet held to the system as directed by the Crown and went ahead with the scheme of the Act. The Catholic stratagem of electoral noncompliance, which was perceived as dereliction, was singularly unsuccessful and led directly to the riots, and subsequent violent death in the same incident of one Catholic protester and one police constable. In the aftermath, the riot was adjudicated as R v Mailloux et al., while the murder of the constable was reported as R v Chiasson.

The convictions were appealed to the New Brunswick Court of Appeal in early 1876. The verdicts were upheld in the matter of the riot, but later vacated due to the lapse of time between incident and conviction. The conviction of Chiasson was vacated on a number of grounds.

== Russell v R (1882) ==
Russell v R is a landmark Privy Council decision regarding the interpretation of the British North America Act 1867, and was one of the first cases explaining the nature of the peace, order and good government power in Canadian federalism. Specifically, it dealt with the powers of Parliament to delegate authority, in this case under the Canada Temperance Act, to, in this instance, municipal councils.

== R v Robertson (1882) ==
The federal government attempted to sell a fishery lease on the Miramichi River. At issue was the locus of jurisdiction. Section 91(12) of the Constitution Act, 1867, assigns to the federal Parliament at Ottawa exclusive legislative authority over Sea Coast and Inland Fisheries. Although it was initially believed that the federal government had exclusive jurisdiction over all fisheries throughout Canada, it was found here that section 91(12) did not have the effect of transferring ownership of the beds of freshwater rivers and lakes to the federal government. The fisheries authority vested in Parliament ends where provincial authority over property and civil rights begins, unless an encroachment is essential to the effectiveness of federal legislation. Under ancient British fisheries law, rights to fish in tidal waters were of a fundamentally different legal character from rights to fish in inland or non-tidal waters. The former were public rights vested in the Crown as parens patriae for the use of the public and could have no new private owner after Magna Charta. The latter, which were the subject of property, required an owner and could not be vested in the public generally. In determining the respective jurisdictions of Parliament and the provinces, the court seized on the distinction between fishing as a public right and fishing as a proprietary right. In the Provincial Fisheries Reference, the Judicial Committee of the Privy Council distinguished between rights of property and legislative jurisdiction, holding that section 91 conferred the latter on the federal Parliament and that only the provinces were competent to deal with the private right of fisheries in inland waters under section 92(5), Management and Sale of Public Lands, or under section 92(13), Property and Civil Rights. Since such "legislation deals directly with property, its disposal, and the rights to be enjoyed in respect of it", it does not fall under section 91(12). As a result, the Province was entitled to allocate the resource; that is, to decide who may fish, how much may be harvested per person, and where the harvesting may occur. It could do this through the issuing of licences, through its own legislation and through property transactions. The federal government retained the right in inland waters to preserve, protect and manage the fisheries. This included the right to set the maximum amount of fish to be harvested, and to impose gear restrictions and limitations on locations. The federal government also retained the right to legislate with respect to the protection of fish habitat and waters frequented by fish. Despite the federal Parliament's inability to legislate respecting property and civil rights, the Privy Council in the Provincial Fisheries Reference made it clear that if federal legislation is truly legislation respecting fisheries it may powerfully affect proprietary rights.

The result of this case was profound. The 25th New Brunswick Legislature passed The Fisheries Act and An Act to provide for the Survey, Reservation and Protection of Lumber Lands. The latter Act created the idea of a private fishing reserve, let from the provincial Crown, and protected by game wardens who had the power to commence the process of gaoling offenders.

== Maritime Bank Liquidators v New Brunswick (1889) ==
This case decided that the (Provincial) Crown was entitled to superior status in monies on demand deposit with respect to other creditors in the liquidation of a bank. Lord Watson:

The appellants... conceded that, until the passing of the BNA Act 1867, there was precisely the same relation between the Crown and the province which now subsists between the Crown and the Dominion. But they maintained that the effect of the statute has been to sever all connection between the Crown and the provinces; to make the government of the Dominion the only government of Her Majesty in North America; and to reduce the provinces to the rank of independent municipal institutions. For these propositions, which contained the sum and substance of the arguments addressed to them in support of this appeal, their Lordships have been unable to find either principal or authority...

The object of the Act was neither to weld the provinces into one, nor to subordinate the provincial governments into a central authority, but to create a federal government in which they should all be represented, entrusted with the exclusive administration of affairs in which they had a common interest, each province retaining its independence and autonomy. That object was accomplished by distributing, between the Dominion and the provinces, all powers executive and legislative, and all public property, and revenues which had previously belonged to the provinces; so that the Dominion government should be vested with such of these powers, property and revenues as were necessary for the due performance of its constitutional functions; and that the remainder should be retained by the provinces for the purposes of provincial government. But, in so far as regards those matters with, by sect. 92, are specially reserved for provincial legislation, the legislation of each province continues to be free from the control [of] the Dominion, and as supreme as it was before the passing of the Act.

It is clear, therefore, that the provincial legislature of New Brunswick does not occupy the subordinate position which was ascribed to it in the arguments of the appellants. It derives no authority from the Government of Canada, and its status is in no way analogous to that of a municipal institution, which is an authority constituted for the purposes of local administration. It possesses powers, not of administration merely, but of legislation, in the strictest sense of that word; and, within the limits assigned by sect. 92 of the Act of 1867, these powers are exclusive and supreme. It would require very express language, such as not to be found in the Act of 1867, to warrant the inference that the Imperial Legislature meant to vest in the provinces of Canada the right of exercising supreme legislative powers in which the British Sovereign was to have no share...

== AG v AG (1904) ==
With the accession to the Dominion of several new provinces after 1900, the Attorneys-General of New Brunswick and of Prince Edward Island had suit against the AG Canada for interpretations disfavourable to their electors.

== Saint John Pilot Commissioners v Cumberland Railway (1909) ==
Whether the Cumberland Railway and Coal Company were liable to the predations of the Saint John Pilot Commissioners was the case in issue here.

== R v Marsh, Ex parte Walker (1909) ==
In R v Marsh, Ex parte Walker (1909), 39 NBR 329, the defendant was a station agent of the Intercolonial Railway at Fredericton. He was convicted under the Canada Temperance Act of an offence of warehousing and keeping for delivery a quantity of intoxicating liquor brought into the railway station by the Intercolonial Railway, while acting as a servant of the railway, a public work owned and operated by the Crown in right of Canada. It was held that the Crown, not being expressly mentioned in the Canada Temperance Act, was not bound thereby and therefore its station agent, acting in the course of his duty, could not be convicted of the offence.

== Inglewood v NB Power (1928) ==
Inglewood v NB Power, in which the Judicial Committee of the Privy Council affirmed the judgment of the NB Supreme Court, dealt with the interest payable on expropriation, and whether or not the loss of game to hunt were actionable.

== King v Assessors of Bathurst County (1928) ==
The issue of whether or not school taxes levied by a county were payable by an employer of significant size was the subject of King v Assessors of Bathurst County, ex parte Bathurst Company Ltd. The King (in effect, the corporation) asked whether the county was right to assess taxes in the amount it did. The court answered in the affirmative but several months later the corporation began velvet blackmail and the government caved and brought in new legislation.

== R v LeBlanc (1930) ==
In R v LeBlanc (1930), 1 MPR 21, acting in obedience to his instructions, a road supervisor stored dynamite belonging to the Crown in the right of the Province of New Brunswick contrary to the Explosives Act, RSC 1927, c. 62, an Act not made binding on the provincial Crown. The conviction of the Crown's servant, acting in the course of his employment which was the construction of a public work, was set aside. The servant was held excluded from the provisions of the Explosives Act as was his employer, the Crown.

== Pitre v R (1932) ==
This 1932 Supreme Court of Canada decision confirmed the re-trial of Pitre, who was tried for murder, because of the error of the trial judge, upon the latter's misdirection of the jury. The trial judge charged the jury in such a way as to give the impression that they should not convict on the uncorroborated evidence of an accomplice and, unless they found corroborative evidence, their duty was to acquit; that this was a misdirection in law; and, under the circumstances, probably had a material effect upon the jury's minds. The jury should be told that it is within their legal province to convict, but should be warned that it is dangerous to convict, and may be advised not to convict, on the uncorroborated evidence of an accomplice. Rex v. Baskerville, [1916] 2 KB. 658; Rex v. Beebe, 19 Cr. App. R. 22; Gouin v. The King, [1926] Can. S.C.R. 539, and other cases referred to. Rinfret, Lamont and Smith JJ. held that the trial judge had rightly refused to allow the evidence of a certain witness as to certain letters being in appellant's handwriting, as the witness’ competency to testify in that regard had not been established; a witness may be competent to testify as to a person's handwriting by reason of having become familiar with his handwriting through a regular correspondence; but in the present case the evidence to establish competency did not shew sufficient to constitute a "regular correspondence."

Pitre was convicted at the re-trial, and was the last person hanged in Bathurst, the shire town for Gloucester County.

== Atlantic Smoke Shops v Conlon (1943) ==
The Tobacco Tax Act, 1940 (N.B.), c. 44, provides, inter alia, that "every consumer of tobacco purchased at a retail sale in the province shall pay to" the province "for the raising of a revenue, at the time of making his purchase, a tax in respect of the consumption of such tobacco" (section 4); and the Act also provides that "every person residing or ordinarily resident or carrying on business in" the province "who brings into the province or who receives delivery in the province of tobacco for his own consumption or for the consumption of other persons at his expense or on behalf of or as agent for a principal who desires to acquire such tobacco for consumption by such principal or other persons at his expense * * * shall pay the same tax in respect of the consumption of such tobacco" (section 5). Section 10 provides that "a consumer shall be and remain liable for the tax imposed by the Act until the same has been collected." Under section 2 (a) "consumer" means not only any person who within the Province purchases tobacco for his own consumption, but also any other person who purchases tobacco in the Province as agent for his principal who desires to acquire such tobacco for consumption by such principal. It was also enacted (section 3 (2)) that only retail vendors licensed under the Act may sell tobacco at a retail sale in the province. Regulations made under the Act by Orders in Council were declared to have the force of statute (section 20 (2)). Regulation 6 provides that "every application for a (retail) vendor's license * * * shall contain an undertaking by the applicant to collect and remit the tax * * * and shall be in Form 2"; and when signing that Form, the applicant undertakes "to act as the agent of the Minister for the collection of the tax * * * and to account to the province * * * for all moneys so collected."

Appeal was made to the Supreme Court of Canada, where the majority held that the Act was within the constitutional powers of the province, except as to the provisions making the agent, who buys tobacco for his principal personally liable for the tax, which provisions were deemed to be severable.

Appeal was then made to the JCPC, which advised His Majesty on 30 July 1943 that the appeal fails and that the Tobacco Tax Act, 1940, is in all respects a valid exercise of the powers of the legislature of the province of New Brunswick. The order of the Supreme Court must, therefore, be varied by omitting the words "with the exception of the provisions thereof making the agent liable for the tax."

== Bathurst Assessors v R (1951) ==
AKA the ex parte suitor, Dexter v Gloucester. Dexter Construction had its head offices in Saint John County. It caused to be erected a subsidiary in Gloucester County. It considered that no taxes were owing in Gloucester County, on account of the Rates and Taxes Act, R.S.N.B. 1927, c. 190, s. 20. The Gloucester County assessors differed, and obtained a judgment that valued the property at $600,000. On appeal to the County Court Judge the latter reduced the assessment to $275,000 but otherwise confirmed it. The NBSC found for Dexter, but the SCC reversed the court below, and held that the County Court Judge was correct.

== Gorton-Pew (1951-2) ==
Gorton-Pew Fisheries, Ltd., a large buyer of fish in Gloucester County, refused to pay for excess weight in three catches of fish. The catches, when weighed, were found to contain about fifteen per cent ice and trash. When the union allowed only a deduction of five per cent, Gorton-Pew withheld a part of the price. Subsequently, bids by Gorton-Pew were not recognized in the union selling rooms, and those who wanted to sell to them were threatened with a blacklisting and told they would not be permitted to hire union crews.

As a result, Gorton-Pew sought to de-certify the union, but was denied by the NBSC.

== Winner v SMT (Eastern) Ltd (1954) ==
Winner v SMT (Eastern) Ltd, the last case of the JCPC that affected Canadian constitutional jurisprudence. One opinion observed that citizens were free to move across provincial borders and live wherever they chose to, and only the federal government could limit this right.

== NB Electric Power Commission v Tobique Salmon Club (1966) ==
The NBEPC was deemed liable for injurious affection of the salmon fishing rights of the Club by reason of the NBEPC having, in 1953, constructed a dam across the non-tidal Tobique River near the point at which it flows into the Saint John River and, in 1957, a dam across the Saint John River at Beechwood, fourteen miles downstream from the Tobique Dam at a point also above tide water. No compulsory power of the NBEPC was exercised in respect of any land or fishing rights owned by the Club. No entry was made by the NBEPC into or upon any lands in which the Club owned an interest. The statutory liability created by the Act was clear to the Court, and hence there was liability on the part of the NBEPC to pay compensation to the Club.

== Bathurst Paper Limited v. Minister of Municipal Affairs of NB (1971) ==
Under the New Brunswick Assessment Act, 1965–66, c. 110, as amended by 1967, c. 25, and 1968, c. 15, the power plant of the appellant company was assessed for tax for the year 1968. On appeal to the Appeals Tribunal set up under the Act, the company was held to be exempt under s. 3 of An Act relating to Bathurst Company, Limited, 1927 (N.B.), c. 75, which Act was confirmed by An Act respecting Bathurst Paper Limited—Les Papeteries Bathurst Limitée, 1966 (N.B.), c. 124. Section 18(2) of the Assessment Act provided for the continued recognition of tax concessions enjoyed before November 19, 1965. On a further appeal to the Court of Appeal, the majority of the Court concluded that because of the repeal by 1968, c. 15, s. 1(b), which had effect as of January 1, 1968, of paras. (ii) and (iv) of s. 1(i) (wherein "tax concession" was defined) the claim of exemption failed. Consequently, the assessment was restored. The company then appealed to the Supreme Court of Canada. The appeal was dismissed.

== Minister of Municipal Affairs (N.B.) v Canaport Ltd (1975) ==
Respondent's property which was assessed as "real property" consisted of an oil terminal on which were constructed various facilities consisting of ten welded steel plate tanks for storage of crude petroleum each having 250,000 barrel capacity, a ballast water tank of 100,000 barrel capacity, a water tank for fire fighting purposes and various other tanks. Respondent alleged that it was entitled to a "tax concession" in relation to these properties under s. 18 of the Assessment Act, 1965-66 (N.B.), c. 110, by virtue of being a subsidiary of Irving Oil Refining Limited and entitled to the concession conferred by the Irving Refining Limited Act, 1958 (N.B.), c. 72, but the trial judge and the Appeal Division were both satisfied that under s. 18(2) of the Assessment Act the concession only applied to companies in existence before November 19, 1965, and that the respondent, incorporated on July 2, 1968, was not entitled to it. There were further concurrent findings in both Courts that the ten tanks were structures providing shelter for moveable property (i.e. that they constituted "buildings" and fell to be assessed as "real property" within the meaning of s. 1(g)(ii) of the Assessment Act) but that they came within the exclusion in s. 1(g)(v). As a result, a declaration was granted that the ten tanks were not "real property" within the meaning of the Assessment Act and not taxable as such under that Act. Held: The appeal should be allowed.

== Irving Oil Co v Minister of Municipal Affairs of NB (1975) ==
Assessment was made of appellant's property, consisting of storage tanks, substructures and associated pipes and facilities, on the assumption that the property constituted ‘real property’ within the meaning of s. 1 (g) of the Assessment Act. Appellant contended on the basis of Acadian Pulp & Paper Ltd. v. Minister of Municipal Affairs (1973), 6 N.B.R. (2d) 755, that the tanks in question were excluded from the definition of ‘real property’ as being ‘machinery, equipment, apparatus and installations other than those for providing services to buildings or mentioned in subclause (ii)’. The trial judge found that the property constituted ‘structures which provide storage and shelter for movable property’ but feeling bound by Acadian Pulp and Paper held that they also constituted ‘machinery, equipment, apparatus and installations other than those providing services to buildings’ and therefore by the operation of s. 1 (g) (v) not ‘real property’ within the meaning of s. 1 (g). The Appeal Division set aside the judgment at trial and distinguished Acadian Pulp and Paper. Held: The appeal should be dismissed.

== BRIDGES BROTHERS LTD. v. FOREST PROTECTION LTD. (1976) ==
The plaintiff, a blueberry farmer, pursued the defendant, which had been constituted in 1952 to combat via aerial spraying of insecticides the spruce budworm and which was instantly employed for its mandated purpose. The plaintiff alleged that in 1970, 1971 and 1972 the defendant's operations reduced the number of bees in the plaintiff's fields thereby adversely affecting the pollination of blueberry flowers and the fruit set which is dependent on pollination, and increased the number of birds feeding on ripe blueberries in the fields, because they could not feed on the moths. The plaintiff sought damages and a perpetual injunction. The plaintiff obtained an interim injunction in May 1971 to forbid the defendant from trespass. The plaintiff was granted a declaration that he was entitled to occupy and use its several properties free from any interference therewith by nuisance created by the defendant causing or allowing fenitrothion to fall upon or drift onto such properties. The plaintiff obtained judgment against the defendant for an astronomical sum, and was awarded restitution of legal fees. As of 2018, the defendant continued in business and was a private company formed by:

- the Province of New Brunswick (majority shareholder)
- J.D. Irving, Limited
- Twin Rivers Paper Company Inc.
- Acadian Timber Corp.
- Fornebu Lumber Company Inc.
- AV Nackawic Inc.
- AV Cell Inc.

== Thorne's Hardware v R (1977) ==
This case pitted the plaintiffs, Thorne's Hardware Limited, Kent Lines Limited, Canaport Limited and Irving Oil Limited, against the National Harbours Board, over the extension of harbour limits. Appellants challenged in the Federal Court (1) the validity of an order in council extending the limits of the port of Saint John so as to include appellants' berth and harbour facilities and (2) the applicability to them of a National Harbours Board's By-law imposing harbour dues on all vessels entering or using the port. The Trial Division held the Order in Council intra vires the powers of the Governor in Council but the By-law to be inapplicable to the appellants. The Court of Appeal disagreed with the trial judge on the second point. Hence this appeal to determine whether the appellants are obliged to pay harbour dues. The appellants alleged that the Order in Council extending the limits of Saint John Harbour had been passed for improper motives to increase harbour revenues. It is neither the Court's duty nor its right to investigate the federal Cabinet's motives. Held: The appeal should be dismissed.

== Forest Protection Limited v Guerin (1979) ==
The now-deceased Lucretia J. Guerin, president of a community organisation named "The Concerned Parents Group Inc." had pursued FPL in the Provincial Court of New Brunswick for violations of some legislation. FPL appealed after unsuccess below into the Court of Queen's Bench of New Brunswick, whereby the three-judge coram found (in contra-distinction to precedent cases) that it was indeed a Crown agency and that thereby it was immune to pursuit under the Pest Control Products Act, but fell under the ambit of the Fisheries Act because of express mention therein.

== NB Broadcasting v NS Assembly Speaker (1993) ==
The Supreme Court of Canada ruled that parliamentary privilege is a part of the unwritten convention in the Constitution of Canada. Therefore, the Canadian Charter of Rights and Freedoms do not apply to members of Nova Scotia House of Assembly when they exercise their inherent privileges of refusing strangers from entering the House. This was decided via New Brunswick Broadcasting Co v Nova Scotia (Speaker of the House of Assembly).

== Charlebois v Mowat (2001) ==
Charlebois impugned a by-law of the City of Moncton, represented by the defendant Mowat because it had not been translated into French, as considered by Charlebois it must. He relied on subsections 16(2) and 18(2) and section 16.1 of the Canadian Charter of Rights and Freedoms, and he submitted that the expression "statutes of the legislature" used in subsection 18(2) includes municipal by-laws and that this provision imposed on municipalities of the province an obligation to enact their by-laws in the two official languages. He argued that, given the significant percentage of the Francophones in this municipality, the obligation applies to the City of Moncton. His claim was successful.

== Harrison et al v AG Canada and AG NB (2005) ==
Same-sex marriage in New Brunswick was legalised in summer 2005 by judicial fiat with the case of Harrison et al. v AG NB. A few weeks later, federal Parliament under the guidance of Paul Martin made same-sex marriages legal throughout Canada by the Civil Marriage Act.

== Judges' pensions (2005) ==
Judges' pensions were determined by the Supreme Court of Canada in Provincial Court Judges' Assn of New Brunswick v New Brunswick (Minister of Justice).

== McKinney v Tobias (2006) ==
Glennie J presents a lengthy and valuable recitation of, and distinctions between, Land Titles Act SNB 1981 C. L-1.1, (antiquated since 2011) Limitations of Actions Act RSNB 1973 c. L-8 or Real Property Limitations Act RSNB 1973 c R-1.5, and (antiquated since 2014) Quieting of Titles Act RSNB 1973 c Q-4, especially as regards adverse possession. Summary of law of real property, as it is affected by Torrens title system in New Brunswick.

== Brunswick News Inc. v Langdon (2007) ==
Brunswick News Inc. v Langdon was a 2007 Queen's Bench case in which the plaintiff employed an Anton Piller order, to enter the defendant's residence and search for some business files that it alleged had been misappropriated. The plaintiff moved for an injunction to halt the publication of the defendant's fledgling rival newspaper, the Carleton Free Press. In the event, the injunction was denied.

== Mercer v Morrison (2010) ==
In this seemingly unreported case, a zealous official attempted to enforce the then newly passed NB Building Code Act, against octogenarian Craig Morrison, of West Quaco, in Saint Martins Parish, New Brunswick. Six courtroom appearances and a front-page news story in the Saint John Telegraph Journal later, Morrison eventually won his battle at age 91. A film based on his tribulations was released just months after his death, to positive critical reviews; James Cromwell earned the Best Actor title for his work at the inaugural Canadian Screen Awards. The provincial agency that employs building inspector Wayne Mercer demanded: that the court forcibly remove Morrison and his wife, an Alzheimer's sufferer, from their home; that the house be bulldozed; and that Morrison be found in contempt of court, an imprisonable offence.

I thought this was a free country, that we had liberties and freedoms like we used to have, but I was sadly mistaken. … All I wanted to do is build a house, and I was treated as if I was some kind of outlaw... They seemed to find fault with everything I did. They were out to get me because I was doing it with my own land and my own lumber and my own trusses and floor joists in my own time.

On 1 November 2010, New Brunswick Court of Queen's Bench Justice Hugh McLellan ordered the two parties to negotiate a settlement, which was done. The state relented and allowed them to abide "without further molestation, until they die." The legislation was not overturned.

== JD Irving v Forest Products Marketing Boards (2014) ==
Plaintiff impugned the operation of the regulator, as the adjudicated "stumpage agreement" between plaintiff and another entity involved the regulator not at all, and thus the regulator had no jurisdiction in private agreements. Further, plaintiff believed that the regulator could not be party to private agreements because regulator was in fact staffed by plaintiff's competitors. Held that the regulator was entitled by Natural Products Act SNB 1999 c. N-1.2 and associated regulations to intrude and to rule, and that deference was due to the regulator. Obiter dicta compared natural products regulator to milk marketing board.

== R v Bourque (2014) ==
Justin Christien Bourque was a paranoid cannabis-using youth who was "obsessed with guns, video games, heavy metal music", and who murdered three police officers and wounded two others, all in the space of twenty minutes on 4 June 2014. In the ensuing manhunt, Bourque led a chase into the woods where he was found 28 hours later. The judge wrote that Bourque may have been struggling in the week prior to the massacre with drug withdrawal because he had no more money to buy marijuana. Bourque presented no defence and pleaded guilty to all counts on the indictment sheet. Bourque was sentenced for the murder of the three police officers to life in prison with no chance of parole for 75 years, which is the longest sentence in Canadian history, and the harshest since the death penalty was abolished for most offences in 1976. The judiciary has the ability to hand down consecutive sentences under the 2011 changes to the legislation for multiple homicides. He was also sentenced to life imprisonment (concurrent) for the attempted murder of the other two police officers.

In the subsequent months, application was made by both the Crown and the Defence to withhold, for the benefit of the various family members and their psychology, certain digital evidence which was employed at the sentencing hearing from the public realm. The Dagenais/Mentuck test was used by Smith CJ to deny the publication ban.

== R v Comeau (2015) ==
In 2015, the R v Comeau test case, over the validity of certain portions of New Brunswick's Liquor Control Act, started trial in Campbellton, New Brunswick. Comeau's defence included a constitutional challenge based on section 121 of the British North America Act, 1867. On 29 April 2016, Judge Ronald LeBlanc invalidated the trade barriers, in part writing: "That historical context leads to only one conclusion: The Fathers of Confederation wanted to implement free trade as between the provinces of the newly formed Canada." The case was heavily mediated, both on the decision as a victory of Daniel against Goliath, and before. One lady, who happens to be the deputy comment editor for the National Post, was a pundit, a director of the registered charity which funded Comeau, and a source of quotations for other journalists. At trial, the New Brunswick Liquor control board that it could go out of business if Mr. Comeau was vindicated, while a professional witness testified for the defence that "two-thirds or more of the customers were from New Brunswick and that 90 per cent" of the floor space in the Listuguj Miꞌgmaq First Nation convenience store at which Comeau's beer was purchased "was devoted to beer sales."

The Crown Attorney appealed the decision directly to the New Brunswick Court of Appeal (the normal path would have been through the Court of Queen's Bench of New Brunswick) on 27 May. Karen Selick, one of three lawyers retained by Comeau at the instance of the National Post's deputy comments editor, termed the appeal "a farce". The Crown alleges that LeBlanc J erred in his legal interpretation of Section 121 of the Constitution Act as follows:

- By interpreting the section to have a meaning contrary to that determined by prior decisions of the Supreme Court of Canada, which are binding on him.
- By concluding without evidence that previous decisions of the Supreme Court were rendered without the benefit of evidence before the trial judge.
- By finding that placing Section 121 in the category of Revenues, Debts, Assets and Taxation in the Constitution Act is of no legal consequence to the determination of its meaning.
- By giving Section 121 a meaning that is internally inconsistent and conflicts with Sections 91, 92, and 94 of the Constitution Act.
- By finding Section 121 was drafted as an absolute free trade provision that constitutionally must be rigorously interpreted as such today.

In October 2016, the NB Court of Appeal decided not to hear the case. The provincial Attorney-General then decided to appeal to the Supreme Court of Canada. On 5 May 2017 leave to appeal was granted, and the tentative hearing date was set for 7 December.

== R v Rafia (2017) ==
Mohamad Rafia, his wife Radna Aldndal and their children immigrated from Syria to Fredericton in about April 2016 as part of a politically-contentious refugee resettlement program. On 18 May 2017, he beat her with a hockey stick for half an hour when she threatened to leave him. She attended Dr. Everett Chalmers Regional Hospital with a friend and it was there that the attack came to light, although Aldndal attempted to lie and blamed her injuries on a fall in the bathtub. On 19 May, he was arrested and jailed. On 24 May, he told a court that he did not know that to beat one's wife with a hockey stick for half an hour was illegal in Canada. Two days later, he pleaded guilty to charges of assault causing bodily harm and uttering a threat to kill her if she followed through and left him. On 8 June he was sentenced to time served plus a year of probation. The police recorded the battered wife as saying,

Being assaulted by her spouse is culturally accepted (in) the country they are from.

A police statement which was read in court remarked that Rafia was aware that the law in Canada differs not from the law in Syria, and the Multicultural Association of Fredericton apparently imparts "federal information sessions, which include educating newcomers about Canadian law". However this may be, Rafia complained to the court,

Why didn't they explain the law when we first came?

through an interpreter, who said:

Officials didn’t inform him of the differences in the law in Canada and that more should have been done to educate him... He's saying that he was not aware of the law and he was coming from a background where the laws are completely different.

A daily reported that the family were refugees sponsored privately under the Syrian refugee resettlement programme. Foreigners who commit crimes in Canada normally risk deportation but for a variety of reasons Rafia could not be deported at that moment.

On 18 June, Conservative MP Kellie Leitch tweeted:

A battered wife and a bloodied hockey stick. That’s the legacy of Trudeau’s Syrian refugee program.

She was upbraided by Immigration Minister Ahmed Hussen, who called her tweet "disgraceful", and said that refugees were given "pre- and post-arrival orientation programs where they are briefed on Canadian laws". NDP immigration critic Jenny Kwan was of the opinion that "Kellie Leitch continues to spout divisive dog-whistle rhetoric even after her own party rejected her and her ideas." Back in Fredericton on 22 June, Liberal MP Matt DeCourcey piled on and said that "her divisive rhetoric doesn't contribute to any positive outcome and distracts from the very real issue of gender-based violence."

== Notes ==
=== Bibliography ===
- LeBreton, Clarence (2002). La Révolte acadienne - 15 janvier 1875. Moncton: Éditions de la Francophonie. ISBN 2-923016-03-3.
