= Alfred Barratt =

English barrister and philosopher (1844–1881)

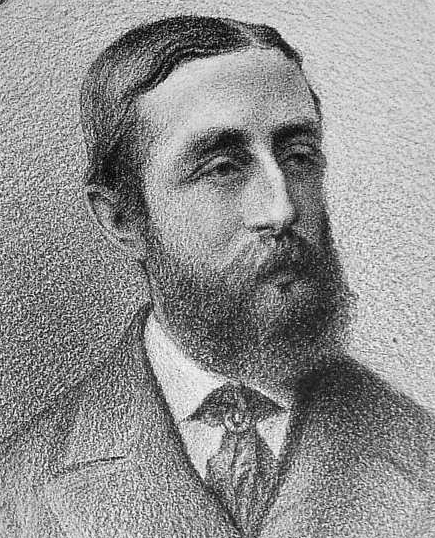
- Born: 12 July 1844; Manchester, England
- Died: 18 May 1881 (aged 36); Oxford, England
- Spouse: Dorothea Barratt (née Davis)

Education
- Education: Balliol College, Oxford

Philosophical work
- Institutions: Brasenose College, Oxford
- Notable works: Physical Ethics, Physical Metempiric

Alfred Barratt (12 July 1844 – 18 May 1881) was an English barrister and philosopher. He trained in law at the University of Oxford, and published his first book, Physical Ethics, in 1869 while studying there. He died an early death in 1881 from overwork as a barrister, secretary to the Oxford University Commission, and philosopher. His second book, Physical Metempiric, was published posthumously in 1883.

== Early life and education ==
Barratt was born in Heald Grove, Manchester, the son of James Barratt, a solicitor. As a child, Barratt showed considerable ability. At the age of 8, he was sent to a day-school where he learnt modern and classical languages. At the age of 12, he was sent to Sandbach School, Cheshire, where he learnt basic Hebrew, Arabic, and Persian from an under-master. At 14, Barratt went to Rugby School, Warwickshire, where in the course of his time there he won 29 prizes.

In 1862, Barratt entered Balliol College, Oxford, and was elected to a scholarship in his first term alongside Edmund Martin Geldart. He was the runner-up to receive the Jenkins Exhibition in 1866. He graduated with a double first in moderations and a first-class in the classics, maths, law, and modern history schools, in 1866. This meant he achieved the considerable distinction of five first classes. Barratt won a fellowship at Brasenose College, Oxford, in 1867, and in January 1869 he published his first book, Physical Ethics, which he had completed in his leisure hours at Oxford. In 1870, he won the Eldon Law Scholarship, and studied law under the Vice-Chancellor of England, John Wickens, and his secretary, Horace Davey.

== Later career and death ==
Barratt was called to the bar in 1872. In 1876, he began working on a new book called Physical Metempiric, and his focus on philosophy interfered with his legal career. He became secretary to the Oxford University Commission in 1880, but the pressure of that work impacted his health. In April 1881, he worked long hours to finish the report of the commission. On 1 May 1881, he suffered paralysis and died on 18 May. His unfinished book, Physical Metempiric, was arranged for publication by Carveth Read. In an obituary, The Times said that Barratt's work "had done much to hasten" the publication of the Oxford University Commission's report, and that in his death "the Junior Bar has lost one of its most gifted and most learned members."

== Personal life ==
In May 1876, Barratt married Dorothea (née Davis), the sister of an old school friend. They had one child together.

== Works ==
=== Physical Ethics ===
Physical Ethics is described as "a most remarkable performance for a youth of twenty-four." The key theory of the book is the unity of all knowledge and the necessity of bringing ethics into harmony with literary power. The theory resembles the work of Herbert Spencer, but at certain times diverges.

=== Physical Metempiric ===
Baratt's Physical Metempiric was left in a "very imperfect state." In it, Barratt starts from the idea that every physical state is the symbol of a state of consciousness, and argues that feeling is not the effect but the cause of motion. It leads to a system of monadism comparable to Gottfried Wilhelm Leibniz's doctrine and theories such as William Kingdon Clifford's 'mindstuff'. Barratt's philosophy has been described as a form of panpsychism.
