= Sierra Club of Canada v Canada (Minister of Finance) =

AECL v Sierra Club
- Supreme Court of Canada

Hearing: November 6, 2001 Judgment: April 26, 2002
- Citations: 2002 SCC 41, [2002] 2 SCR 522
- Docket No.: 28020
- Prior history: APPEAL from
- Ruling: Appeal allowed

Court membership
- Chief Justice: Beverley McLachlin; Puisne Justices: Claire L'Heureux-Dubé, Charles Gonthier, Frank Iacobucci, John C. Major, Michel Bastarache, Ian Binnie, Louise Arbour, Louis LeBel

Reasons given
- Unanimous reasons by: Iacobucci J.

Sierra Club of Canada v Canada (Minister of Finance) is a Supreme Court of Canada decision, which was reached in 2002. The case is also known as Atomic Energy of Canada Limited v. Sierra Club of Canada.

== History ==
The decision was reached after a Non-Governmental Organization (or "NGO") sought judicial review of the federal government’s decision to provide financial assistance to a Crown corporation (in this case, for the sale of nuclear reactors and construction thereof). The Crown corporation requested a confidentiality order in respect of certain documents, and the NGO contested the request.

=== Sierra Club test ===
The proper analytical approach to be applied to exercise of judicial discretion where a litigant seeks confidentiality order is now known as the Sierra Club test. The deleterious effects of granting a confidentiality order include a negative effect on the open court principle were noted by Iacobucci J. but they were outweighed by the salutary effects of the grant.

Three important elements are subsumed under the first branch of the test. First, the risk must be real and substantial, well grounded in evidence, posing a serious threat to the commercial interest in question. Second, the important commercial interest must be one which can be expressed in terms of a public interest in confidentiality, where there is a general principle at stake. Finally, the judge is required to consider not only whether reasonable alternatives are available to such an order but also to restrict the order as much as is reasonably possible while preserving the commercial interest in question.

Under the second branch of the test, the confidentiality order would have significant salutary effects on the affected party's right to a fair trial.

== See also ==
- Dagenais v Canadian Broadcasting Corp
- R v Mentuck
