= Provincial Fisheries Reference =

1898 Canadian case

AG Canada v Provincial AGs
- Court: Judicial Committee of the Privy Council
- Full case name: The Attorneys General for the Provinces of Ontario v The Attorney General for the Dominion of Canada
- Decided: 26 May 1898
- Citation: 1898 UKPC 30

Case history
- Appealed from: Supreme Court of Canada

Court membership
- Judges sitting: Lord Herschell, Lord Watson, Lord Macnaghten, Lord Morris, Lord Shand, Lord Davey, Sir Henry De Villiers, The Lord Chancellor

Case opinions
- Decision by: Lord Herschell

The Provincial Fisheries Reference was a lawsuit decided in 1898 by the Judicial Committee of the Privy Council (JCPC). It arose from a government turf war in Canada over the jurisdictional boundaries of property rights in relation to rivers, lakes, harbours, fisheries, and other cognate subjects. The 12-page judgment was delivered by Lord Herschell, and followed on from R v Robertson (1882). This case in the JCPC was an amalgamation of three separate Supreme Court of Canada appeals, which were grouped into one because of their similarities. The judgment broke little ground, and can be considered a ringing affirmation of the Strong court.
