= AB v CD (UK) =

Trade union case ruling of the United Kingdom Court of Appeal

- Court: Court of Appeal
- Citation: [2001] IRLR 808

Court membership
- Judge sitting: Sir Andrew Morritt VC

Keywords
- Trade union, governance

AB v CD [2001] IRLR 808 is a UK labour law case, concerning the governance of trade unions in the United Kingdom.

== Facts ==
The president of the National Union of Rail, Maritime and Transport Workers (RMT) wanted a declaration that the election for the Council of Executives breached union rules. A single transferable vote would be used according to rule 13 but there was no provision for a tie scenario. Mr Tilley and Mr Grundy tied at the second round, and Mr Tilley was appointed because he had more first round votes, as the Electoral Reform Society rules would suggest. Many people disagreed, and Mr Grundy argued that the Electoral Reform Society rules should not be implied.

== Judgment ==
Sir Andrew Morritt VC held that it was appropriate to imply the Electoral Reform Society rules and recommendations, "by reason of necessity" arising from the RMT rules being incomplete.

== See also ==
- UK labour law
