= Horace Davey, Baron Davey =

English judge and Liberal politician

The Right Honourable The Baron Davey
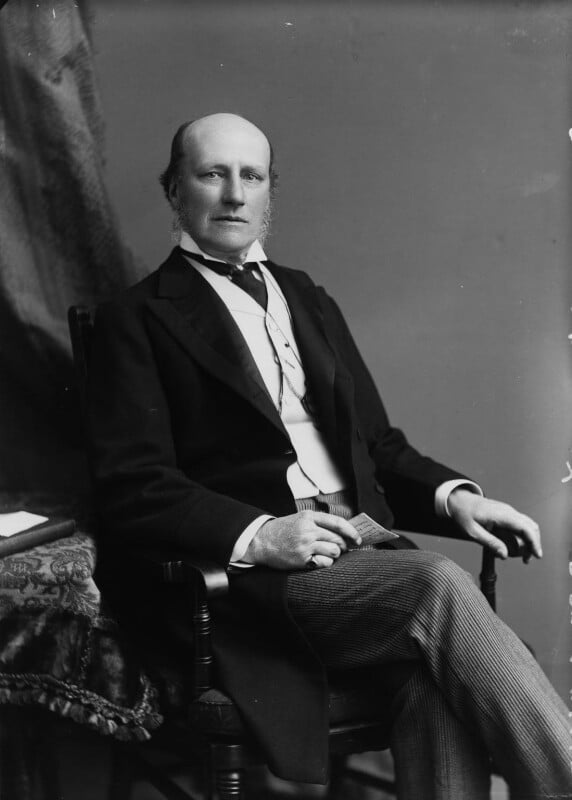
- Photograph by Alexander Bassano, c. 1894

Lord of Appeal in Ordinary
- In office 18 August 1894 – 20 February 1907
- Monarchs: Victoria; Edward VII

Lord Justice of Appeal
- In office 19 October 1893 – 18 August 1894

Solicitor General for England and Wales
- In office February to July 1886
- Prime Minister: William Ewart Gladstone
- Preceded by: Sir John Eldon Gorst
- Succeeded by: Sir Edward Clarke

Member of the House of Lords
- Lord Temporal
- Lord of Appeal in Ordinary; 13 August 1894 – 20 February 1907

Member of Parliament for Christchurch
- In office 1880–1885
- Preceded by: Sir Henry Drummond Wolff
- Succeeded by: Charles Young

Stockton-on-Tees
- In office 1888–1892
- Preceded by: Joseph Dodds
- Succeeded by: Thomas Wrightson

Personal details
- Born: 30 August 1833 Camberwell, Surrey
- Died: 20 February 1907 (aged 73) London
- Party: Liberal (1880–1892)
- Spouse: Louisa Hawes Donkin
- Relations: John Donkin (father-in-law)
- Children: four daughters, two sons
- Education: Rugby School; University College, Oxford
- Profession: Barrister

Horace Davey, Baron Davey, PC, FRS, FBA (30 August 1833 – 20 February 1907) was an English lawyer, Liberal politician, and judge.

Graduating with a double first class degree in classics and mathematics from Oxford, he read law and was called to the bar. He specialised in chancery cases and acquired a strong reputation. Appointed Queen’s Counsel, he entered politics and was elected to the House of Commons in 1880, but was defeated in the 1885 general election. He was re-elected in a by-election in 1886, but defeated in the 1892 general election. He served as Solicitor General for England and Wales in Gladstone's short third ministry in 1886.

Davey was appointed to the English Court of Appeal in 1893, and then appointed to the House of Lords with a life peerage in 1894. He died in 1907, survived by his wife, four daughters and two sons.

== Early life and family ==
Davey was born on 30 August 1833, in Camberwell, Surrey. His parents were Peter Davey, of Horton, Buckinghamshire and Caroline Emma Pace. He was their third son. Davey was educated at Rugby and University College, Oxford. He took a double first-class in Classics and Mathematics (Moderations and Finals), BA awarded 1856, MA 1859. He was senior mathematical scholar and was elected a fellow of his college. Deciding on a career in law, he was awarded the Eldon Law Scholarship.

Davey was admitted to Lincoln's Inn on 19 January 1857. On 26 January 1861, he was called to the Bar at Lincoln's Inn. The following summer, he married Louisa Hawes Donkin at St George's, Camberwell, on 5 August 1862. She was the daughter of John Donkin of Ormond House, Old Kent Road, a civil engineer.

== Legal career ==
Davey's success at law reporting allowed him to read in the chambers of John Wickens, at Lincoln's Inn. As an equity pleader and early pupillage, he became a junior counsel at the Treasury, devilling in the Court of Chancery. When John Wickens was appointed Vice-Chancellor in the court, he went with his old master as his secretary. After Wickens died in 1873, Davey continued in the post (1873–74) when Vice-Chancellor Hall was appointed.

On the basis of this experience he was recommended for Queen's Counsel on 23 June 1875. He selected to join Sir George Jessel's court, often appearing before the redoubtable Joseph William Chitty. Quickly moved to the House of Lords, Davey had rapidly developed a reputation for argumentation at the bar. Viscount Alverstone called him "the most brilliant barrister." As counsel his well-known cases included: Speight v. Gaunt (1883), Learoyd v. Whiteley (1887), Derry v. Peek (1889). Lord Haldane, himself, the greatest intellectual philosopher-politician of his generation described Davey as "the finest advocate on pure points of law..." Lord MacNaughten believed that there was no one better at "arguing a point of practice."

Devoting himself to the Chancery side, Davey soon acquired a large practice, and in 1875 was appointed Queen's counsel.

Davey was standing counse] to the University of Oxford, and senior counsel to the Charity Commissioners, and was engaged in all the important Chancery suits of his time. Among the chief leading cases in which he took a prominent part were those of The Mogul Steamship Company v. M'Gregor, Gow & Co., 1892, Boswell v. Coaks, 1884, Erlanger v. New Sombrero Company, 1878, and the Ooregum Gold Mines Company v. Roper, 1892; he was counsel for the promoters in the trial of Edward King, Bishop of Lincoln, and leading counsel in the Berkeley peerage case. In 1893, he was raised to the bench as a Lord Justice of Appeal, and on 18 August the next year was made a Lord of Appeal in Ordinary and a life peer as Baron Davey, of Fernhurst in the County of Sussex. Lord Davey's great legal knowledge was displayed in his judgments no less than at the bar. In legislation, he was a keen promoter of the act passed in 1906 for the checking of gambling.

== Political career ==
Davey entered politics in the general election of 1880, elected to the House of Commons as a Liberal for Christchurch. However he lost his seat in the general election of November 1885. After the fall of the Conservative government in January 1886, Gladstone returned to power in February 1886 and appointed Davey as Solicitor General for England and Wales in his short-lived third ministry. Appointed on 16 February 1886, Davey was knighted on 8 March 1886. However, he was without a seat in Parliament, having been defeated in both Ipswich and Stockport in 1886. In December 1888, he was returned in a by-election at Stockton-on-Tees, but lost again in July 1892 at the General Election.

== Judicial career ==
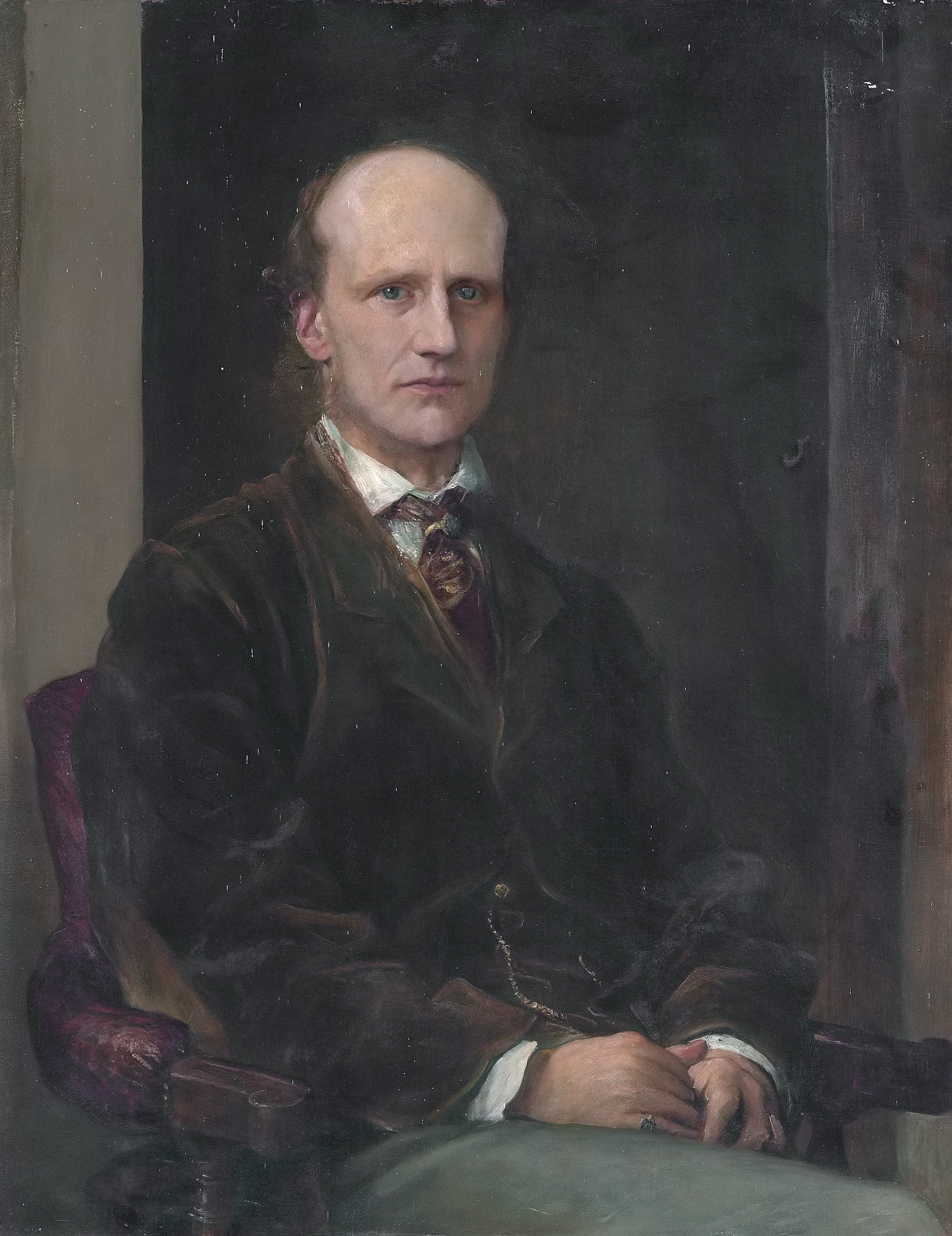
Horace Davey, Baron Davey (1833–1907)

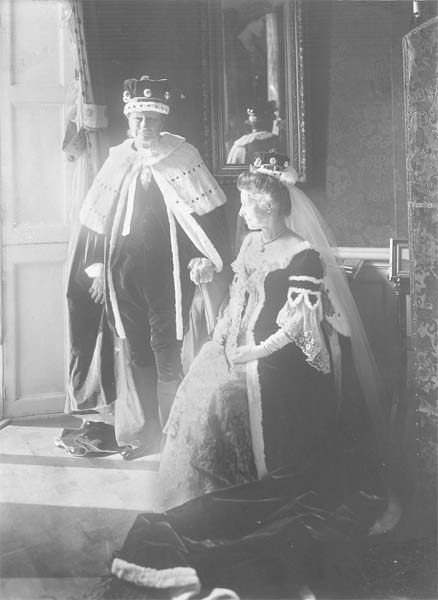
Baron and Baroness Davey in baronial robes for the coronation of Edward VII, June 1902.

Having left parliament for the last time Davey was appointed as a bencher in Lincoln's Inn, on being promoted to the Court of Appeal on 23 September 1893. By 23 November he was sworn to the Privy Council. Monson v. Tussauds Ltd (1894) was a case that determined the future of a museum. On 13 August, Davey was made a Lord of Appeal in Ordinary.

In the famous Wee Frees Case, General Assembly of Free Church of Scotland (1906) the Great War intervened to withhold a judgement. The occasion of a united church of Presbyterians caused the sale of property, the church lost £2 m of real property. Haldane, acting for the church successfully argued the case in point, but lost the decision, although he won the deeds of property. Nonetheless Parliament legislated at the transfer was ordered.

The case of Salomon v. Salomon (1896) was a precedent for many years on the nature of company law and incorporation. The case of Allen v. Flood (1898) symbolized the number of political arguments between Liberals, like Davey and the Conservative Lord Halsbury, over the propriety of Trade Union rights.

Walter v. Lane (1900) was a case about the law of copyright for reporters. Burland v. Earle (1901) was the fraud in the exception to the contract rules since 1843 in Foss v. Harbottle (1901). Noakes Co v. Rice (1901) and Bradley v. Carritt (1903) were cases about the collateral benefits in mortgage laws. In Ruben v. G. Fingall Cons (1906) it was established the effects of a forged certificate on a company.

In 1905, Davey approached the Liberal leader Sir Henry Campbell-Bannerman to become Lord Chancellor in the new government, but was turned down in favour of Lord Loreburn. Davey and Lord Lindley were perhaps the greatest intellects of their generation. Lord MacNaughten, himself a powerful thinker, called Davey "the most lawyer of his day."

== Court appointments ==
Davey was counsel to Oxford University, 1877–93. He was made an honorary fellow of University College, Oxford in 1884, and an honorary DCL by the University of Oxford in 1894. On 24 Jan 1895, Davey was made a Fellow of the Royal Society (FRS). As Treasurer of Lincoln's Inn he headed the Inn of Court, in 1897. Partly due to the influence of his friend, Richard Haldane, Lord Davey was appointed Chairman of the Royal Commission to reconstitute the Statutes of the University of London (1897–98). He was also a Fellow of the British Academy from 1905.

== Death ==
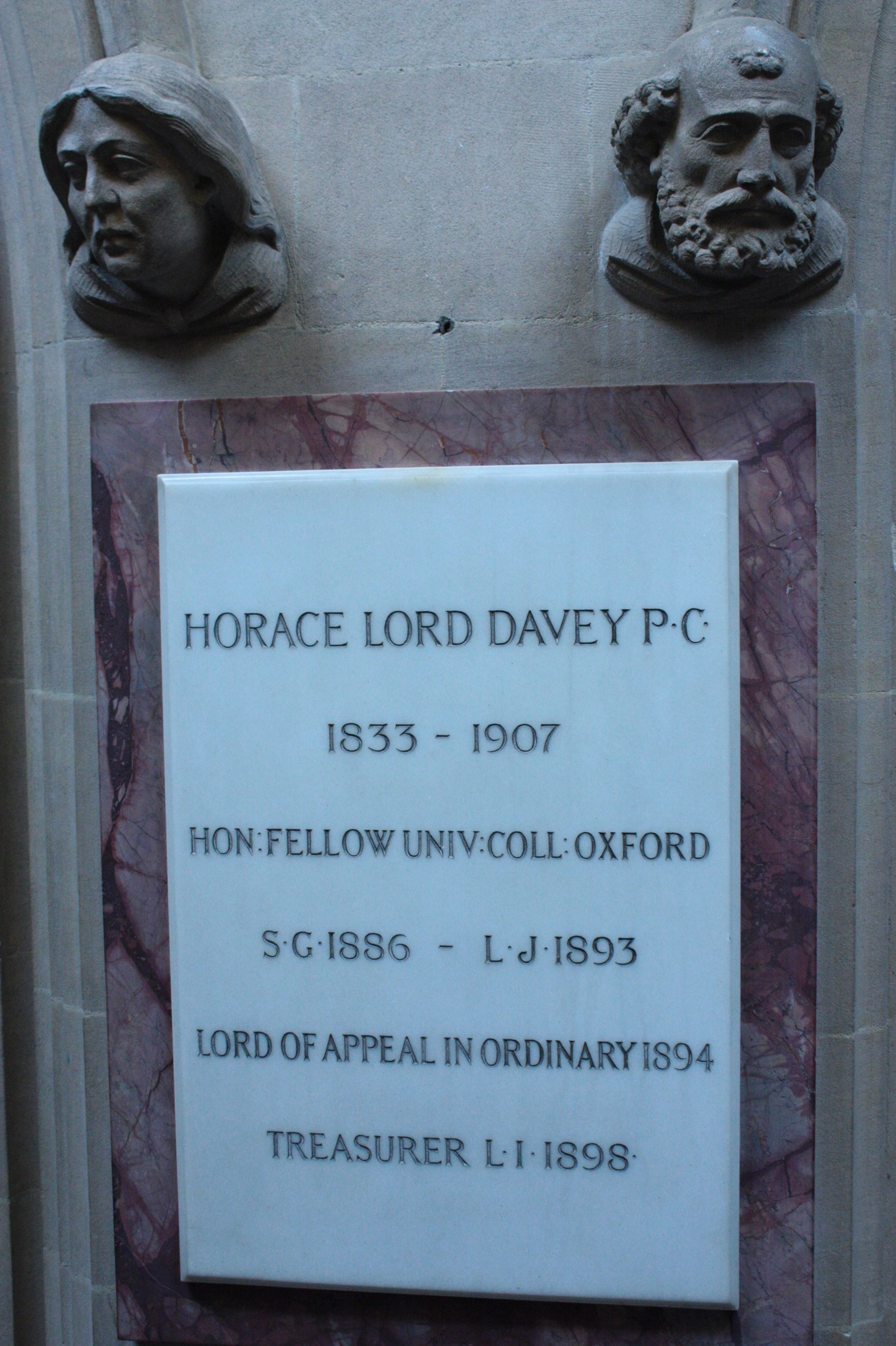
Memorial to Horace Davey, Lincoln's Inn Chapel

Lord Davey died in London on 20 February 1907, aged 74. He was survived by his wife, four daughters and two sons. He was buried at Forest Row, East Grinstead, three days later. His will was granted probate on 3 April 1907, worth £172,398 14s 6d.

== Arms ==
Coat of arms of Horace Davey, Baron Davey
Crest A demi-lion Proper holding between the paws a mullet pierced Gules and supporting under the sinister paw a sword point downwards also Proper hilt and pommel Or. Escutcheon Ermine a chevron Sable between three mullets pierced Gules in the centre chief point a balance Or. Supporters On either side a lion gorged with a double chain Gold therefrom pendent a mullet pierced Gules each holding in the paw a sword erect also Proper hilt and pommel Or. Motto J’Essayerai

== Bibliography ==
- R B Haldane, An Autobiography (London: Hodder & Stoughton, 1929)

Parliament of the United Kingdom
Preceded by Henry Drummond Wolff	Member of Parliament for Christchurch; 1880–1885	Succeeded by Charles Young
Preceded by Joseph Dodds	Member of Parliament for Stockton-on-Tees; 1888–1892	Succeeded by Thomas Wrightson
Political offices
Preceded by Sir John Eldon Gorst	Solicitor General for England and Wales; 1886	Succeeded by Sir Edward Clarke
