= Cumbrian Newspapers Group Ltd v Cumberland & Westmoreland Herald Ltd =

1986 UK company law case

Cumbrian Newspapers Ltd v C&W Herald Co Ltd
- Court: High Court
- Full case name: Cumbrian Newspapers Group Ltd v Cumberland & Westmorland Herald Newspaper & Printing Co Ltd
- Citation: [1986] BCLC 286

Case opinions
- Scott J

Keywords
- Share, class rights

Cumbrian Newspapers Group Ltd v Cumberland & Westmorland Herald Newspaper & Printing Co Ltd [1986] BCLC 286 is a UK company law case concerning variation of the class rights attached to shares.

== Facts ==
CNG published the Penrith Observer with a 5500 weekly circulation. The chairman Sir John Burgess (as he later became) also had 10.67% of the shares in CWHNP since 1968. Under the constitution CNG had negotiated special rights which it had bargained for in return for closing down a competing paper, the Cumberland Herald, when it had joined, and for acting as CWHNP’s advertising agent. It had the right to preferences on unissued shares (article 5) to not be subject to have a transfer of shares to it refused by the directors (article 7) pre emption rights (article 9) and the right to appoint a director if shareholding remained above 10% (article 12). The CWHNP directors wanted to cancel CNG’s special rights. CNG argued they were class rights that could only be varied with its consent.

== Judgment ==
Scott J held that the CNG's rights as a shareholder could not be varied without its consent because they were class rights when they were conferred ‘special rights on one or more of its members in the capacity of member or shareholder’. He set out three main categories of "special rights" that might exist: (1) rights annexed to shares (2) rights for particular people under the constitution, and (3) rights unattached to particular shares but conferring a benefit on a group of members. Strictly they could not fall into the first category of rights ‘annexed to’ particular shares, because CNG’s special rights came from the constitution. A second classification of right might be like that in Eley v Positive Government Security Life Assurance Co Ltd but they were not like that either. A third category involves rights or benefits that, although not attached to any particular shares, were nonetheless conferred on the beneficiary in the capacity of member or shareholder of the company.’ These are in this category. It is like the rights in Bushell v Faith. Enforcement of such rights depends simply on the possession of some shares, except article 12 which would appear to require 10% for enforcement. But what did the legislature mean with the phrase ‘rights attached to a class of shares’? ‘It would, in my opinion, be surprising and unsatisfactory if class rights contained in articles were to be at the mercy of a special resolution majority at a general meeting, unless they were rights attached to particular shares.’ So, he said that the phrase ‘was intended by the legislature to cater for the variation or abrogation of any special rights given by the memorandum or articles of a company to any class of members, that is to say, not only rights falling into the first category I have described, but also rights falling into the third category.’

The court also held that this applied not just to rights, but also to obligations. So in Rayfield v Hands [1960] Ch 1 the obligation of shareholders who were directors to purchase the shares of non-director shareholders on request was enforceable on the same basis as a class right (or class obligation) of the director-shareholders.

== See also ==
- UK company law
