= Toronto Star Newspapers Ltd v Ontario =

2005 Supreme Court of Canada case

- Supreme Court of Canada

Hearing: February 9, 2005 Judgment: June 29, 2005
- Full case name: Her Majesty The Queen v Toronto Star Newspapers Ltd, Canadian Broadcasting Corporation and Sun Media Corporation
- Citations: [2005] 2 SCR 188, 2005 SCC 41
- Docket No.: 30113
- Prior history: APPEAL from Ontario Court of Appeal
- Ruling: Appeal dismissed

Court membership
- Chief Justice: Beverley McLachlin; Puisne Justices: John C. Major, Michel Bastarache, Ian Binnie, Louis LeBel, Marie Deschamps, Morris Fish, Rosalie Abella, Louise Charron

Reasons given
- Unanimous reasons by: yes
- Majority: Fish J

Toronto Star Newspapers Ltd v Ontario is a Supreme Court of Canada case.

Fish J. wrote a unanimous verdict for the Court, rejecting Crown contentions that the investigative procedure ought to be withheld from public view, in this case of insalubrious slaughter of cattle at the Aylmer Meat Packers plant in Toronto. In fact, the scandal that ensued had a part in changing the leadership of the province.

A justice of the peace had issued six search warrants for various locations linked to the Aylmer business. The investigation by the Ontario Ministry of Natural Resources and the Canadian Food Inspection Agency on Sunday 23 August 2003 into the operation of Aylmer became the subject of widespread media reports five days after the execution of the warrants, after the following Wednesday Ontario public safety commissioner Dr. James Young told consumers not to eat any meat products from the Aylmer slaughterhouse. The suitability for human consumption of meat slaughtered and processed by Aylmer became a matter of public concern. The company was investigated for "possible offences involving the illegal processing of deadstock." Online records show that, as a result of the tainted meat scandal, company president Butch Clare pleaded guilty to distributing improperly labelled meat and received fines totalling $15,000.

== Opinion of the Court ==
The Dagenais/Mentuck test applies to all discretionary court orders that limit freedom of expression and freedom of the press in relation to legal proceedings, including orders to seal search warrant materials made upon application by the Crown. Court proceedings are presumptively “open” in Canada and public access will be barred only when the appropriate court, in the exercise of its discretion, concludes that disclosure would subvert the ends of justice or unduly impair its proper administration. Though applicable at every stage of the judicial process, the Dagenais/Mentuck test must be applied in a flexible and contextual manner, and regard must be had to the circumstances in which a sealing order is sought by the Crown, or by others with a real and demonstrated interest in delaying public disclosure.

In any constitutional climate, the administration of justice thrives on exposure to light — and withers under a cloud of secrecy. ... The issue in this case is whether [the Dagenais/Mentuck] test, developed in the context of publication bans at the time of trial, applies as well at the precharge or “investigative stage” of criminal proceedings. More particularly, whether it applies to “sealing orders” concerning search warrants and the informations upon which their issuance was judicially authorized. ... [T]he Dagenais/Mentuck test applies to all discretionary court orders that limit freedom of expression and freedom of the press in relation to legal proceedings. Any other conclusion appears to me inconsistent with an unbroken line of authority in this Court over the past two decades. And it would tend to undermine the open court principle inextricably incorporated into the core values of s. 2(b) of the Charter... [The Court below] emphasized the importance of freedom of expression and of the press, and noted that applications to intrude on that freedom must be “subject to close scrutiny and meet rigorous standards”
