= Vice-Chancellor of the County Palatine of Lancaster =

Political office of the Duchy of Lancaster

The Vice-Chancellor of the County Palatine of Lancaster is an office of the Duchy of Lancaster. The vice-chancellor is appointed by the Chancellor of the Duchy of Lancaster after consultation with the Lord High Chancellor of Great Britain. Since 1987, the vice-chancellor has been a High Court judge of the Chancery Division with a term of approximately three years.

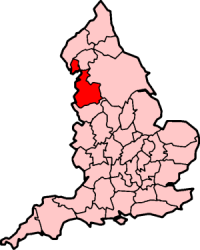
Lancashire County Palatine shown within England

The Vice-Chancellor of the County Palatine of Lancaster exercises general supervision over the conduct of Chancery division business in the North of England and is an ex-officio member of the court of Lancaster University.

Before the implementation of the Courts Act 1971, the appointment of the Vice-Chancellor of the County Palatine was controlled by section 14 of the Administration of Justice Act 1928 (repealed by Schedule 11, Part 2 of the Courts Act 1971). From 1973 to 1987, Andrew James Blackett-Ord, a circuit judge held the post. Since then, the office has been held by a Justice of the High Court sitting in the Chancery Division.

== List of vice-chancellors ==
Source: Somerville, Duchy of Lancaster Office Holders, (1871 onwards): Northern Circuit

- 1649 and 1651: Thomas Fell
- ?–?1790: William Swinnerton (served 33 years, died 1790)
- 1791-1799: James Allan Park
- 1800-1815: Edward King
- 1815-1820: William David Evans
- 1820-1822: Samuel Yate Benton
- 1826-1844 :Francis Ludlow Holt
- 1849–1851: William Page Wood
- 1851–1852: Richard Bethell, 1st Baron Westbury
- 1853–1868: William Milbourne James
- 1868–1871: John Wickens
- 1871–1881: George Little
- 1881–1893: Henry Fox Bristowe
- 1893–1895: William Fothergill Robinson
- 1895–1905: Sir Samuel Hall
- 1905–1912: Octavius Leigh-Clare
- 1912–1919: Sir Dudley Stewart-Smith
- 1919–1925: Roger Bernard Lawrence
- 1925–1936: Sir (William) Courthope Townshend Wilson
- 1936–1948: Sir John Bennett
- 1948–1963: Sir (John) Leonard Stone
- 1963–1973: Sir Thomas Burgess
- 1973–1987: Andrew James Blackett-Ord

Since 1987

- 1987–1991: Sir Richard Scott
- 1991–1994: Sir Andrew Morritt
- 1994–1999: Sir Jonathan Parker
- 1999–2002: Sir William Blackburne
- 2002–2005: Sir Timothy Lloyd
- 2005–2008: Sir Nicholas Patten
- 2008–2012: Sir David Richards
- 2012–2013: Sir Michael Briggs
- 2013-2017: Sir Alastair Norris
- 2017-2019: Sir Gerald Barling
- 2019-2021: Sir Richard Snowden
- 2021: Sir Timothy Fancourt
- 2024: Sir Tom Leech
