= Rayfield v Hands =

1960 British company law case

- Court: High Court (Chancery Division)
- Citation: [1960] Ch 1

Case opinions
- Vaisey J

Keywords
- Constitution, purchase of shares, articles

Rayfield v Hands [1960] Ch 1 is a UK company law case, concerning the enforceability of obligations against a company.

== Facts ==
Mr Rayfield sued the directors of Field Davis Ltd to buy his shares. Article 11 of the company’s constitution said ‘Every member who intends to transfer shares shall inform the directors who will take the said shares equally between them at a fair value.’ The directors were refusing to follow this rule, and Mr Rayfield sought an injunction.

== Judgment ==
Vaisey J granted the injunction and held the article imposed an obligation on the directors, not as officers, but also in their capacity as members. He referred to Re Leicester Club and County Racecourse Co where Pearson J referred to directors as ‘working members of the company’ and that ‘they are doing their work in the capacity of members, and working members of the company’. He referred to the privity decisions of Denning LJ in Smith and Snipes Hall Farm Ltd v River Douglas Catchment Board and Drive Yourself Hire Co (London) Ltd v Strutt and also Carlill v Carbolic and The Satanita to say that the company did not need to be joined to the action to bring it, even though a members create a contractual relation with the company.

Now the question arises at the outset whether the terms of article 11 relate to the rights of members inter se (that being the expression found in so many of the cases), or whether the relationship is between a member as such and directors as such. I may dispose of this point very briefly by saying that, in my judgment, the relationship here is between the plaintiff as a member and the defendants not as directors but as members. In In re Leicester Club and County Racecourse Co, Pearson J, referring to the directors of a company said that they "continue members of the company, and I prefer to call them working members of the company," and on the same page he also said: "directors cannot divest themselves of their character of members of the company. From first to last, ... they are doing their work in the capacity of members, and working members of the company. ..." I am of opinion, therefore, that this is in words a contract or quasi-contract between members, and not between members and directors.

== Authority ==
The case was approved by Scott J in Cumbrian Newspapers Group Ltd v Cumberland & Westmorland Herald Newspaper & Printing Co Ltd [1986] BCLC 286.

== See also ==
- UK company law
- Capacity in English law
- Agency in English law
