= Attorney General of the United Kingdom =

There is no position of Attorney General of the United Kingdom, as England and Wales, Scotland and Northern Ireland have different legal systems.

The term Attorney General when used in the United Kingdom may refer to:

- Attorney General for England and Wales
- Advocate General for Scotland
- Attorney General for Northern Ireland

Attorney General may also refer to historic positions which no longer exist:

- Attorney-General for Ireland, until 1921, of which the now Northern Ireland formed a part.
- Lord Advocate, until 1999, the former position for the top legal advisor on Scots law.

Separately, there are largely ceremonial roles of:

- Attorney-General of the Duchy of Cornwall
- Attorney-General of the Duchy of Lancaster
