= Reasons of the Supreme Court of Canada by Justice Fish =

This is a list of all the reasons that were written by Morris Fish during his tenure as puisne justice of the Supreme Court of Canada up to the end of 2007.

== 2004 ==
Morris Fish 2004 statistics

7	Majority or Plurality	0	Concurrence	0	Other
3	Dissent	0	Concurrence/dissent	Total =	10
Written opinions = ?		Oral opinions = ?		Unanimous opinions = ?

Case name	Issue	Co-authored by	Joined by
R v Lyttle [2004] 1 SCR 193; 2004 SCC 5	Cross examination	Major J.	Unanimous
Transport North American Express Inc v New Solutions Financial Corp [2004] 1 SCR 249; 2004 SCC 7	Illegal contracts.	None	Deschamps J.
R v Kehler [2004] 1 SCR 328; 2004 SCC 11	Corroborating evidence by an accomplice	None	Unanimous
R v Fontaine [2004] 1 SCR 702; 2004 SCC 27	Mental disorder automatism	None	Unanimous
Monsanto Canada Inc v Schmeiser [2004] 1 SCR 902; 2004 SCC 34	Biological patent	McLachlin C.J.	Major, Binnie and Deschamps JJ.
Banque nationale de Paris (Canada) v 165836 Canada Inc [2004] 2 SCR 45; 2004 SCC 37	Law of obligations	None	McLachlin C.J. and Binnie, Arbour, LeBel JJ.
Cabiakman v Industrial Alliance Life Insurance Co [2004] 3 SCR 195; 2004 SCC 55	Employment law	LeBel J.	Iacobucci, Bastarache, Binnie, and Deschamps JJ.
Glykis v Hydro-Québec [2004] 3 SCR 285; 2004 SCC 60	Interruptions of public services	LeBel J.	None
R v Sazant [2004] 3 SCR 635; 2004 SCC 77	Preliminary hearings	Bastarache J.	None
Martineau v MNR [2004] 3 SCR 737; 2004 SCC 81	Self-incrimination; Charter rights	None	Unanimous

== 2005 ==
Morris Fish 2005 statistics

11	Majority or Plurality	1	Concurrence	0	Other
3	Dissent	0	Concurrence/dissent	Total =	15
Written opinions = ?		Oral opinions = ?		Unanimous opinions = ?

Case name	Issue	Co-authored by	Joined by
R v Clark [2005] 1 SCR 6; 2005 SCC 2	Criminal disorderly conduct	None	Unanimous
R v Roberts [2005] 1 SCR 22; 2005 SCC 3	Defence of provocation	None	None
R v Ménard [2005] 1 SCR 24; 2005 SCC 4	Appealing jury verdict; jury instruction	None	Unanimous
R v Decorte [2005] 1 SCR 133; 2005 SCC 9	Arbitrary convention; Charter; First Nation police powers	None	Unanimous
R v Paice [2005] 1 SCR 339; 2005 SCC 22	Defence of consent; R. v. Jobidon	None	None
R v Chow [2005] 1 SCR 384; 2005 SCC 24	interception of communications	None	Unanimous
HL v Canada (AG) [2005] 1 SCR 401; 2005 SCC 25	Appellate review, questions of fact	None	McLachlin C.J. and Major, Binnie and Abella JJ.
R v Dionne [2005] 1 SCR 665; 2005 SCC 29	Circumstantial evidence	None	Unanimous
R v Fice [2005] 1 SCR 742; 2005 SCC 32	Conditional sentencing	None	Deschamps J.
Toronto Star Newspapers Ltd v Ontario [2005] 2 SCR 188; 2005 SCC 41	Freedom of the Press, open courts	None	Unanimous
R v Woods [2005] 2 SCR 205; 2005 SCC 42	Compelling breath samples	None	Unanimous
R v Hamilton [2005] 2 SCR 432; 2005 SCC 47	Counselling criminal offences by email	None	McLachlin C.J. and Bastarache, Binnie, LeBel and Deschamps JJ.
R v RC [2005] 3 SCR 99; 2005 SCC 61	Forensic DNA analysis	None	McLachlin C.J. and Major, Binnie and Deschamps JJ.
Contino v Leonelli-Contino [2005] 3 SCR 217; 2005 SCC 63	Shared custody	None	None
May v Ferndale Institution [2005] 3 SCR 809; 2005 SCC 82	Transfer inmates; Habeas corpus	LeBel J.	McLachlin C.J. and Binnie, Deschamps and Abella JJ.

== 2006 ==
Morris Fish 2006 statistics

4	Majority or Plurality	0	Concurrence	0	Other
2	Dissent	0	Concurrence/dissent	Total =	6
Written reasons = ?		Oral reasons = ?		Unanimous reasons = ?

Case name	Issue	Co-authored by	Joined by
R v Chaisson; 1 SCR 415; 2006 SCC 11	Arbitrary detention; appeals	None	Unanimous
R v Rodgers; 1 SCR 554; 2006 SCC 15	DNA samples; Charter	None	Binnie and Deschamps JJ.
R v Graveline; 1 SCR 609; 2006 SCC 16	Criminal appeals	None	McLachlin C.J. and Bastarache, Binnie, Abella and Charron JJ.
R v Gagnon; 2 SCR 621; 2006 SCC 17	Giving reasons for a judgment	Deschamps J.	None
Blank v Canada (Minister of Justice); 2006 SCC 39	Solitictor-client privilege	None	McLachlin C.J. and Binnie, Deschamps and Abella JJ.
Robertson v Thomson Corp; 2006 SCC 43	copyright in electronic databases	LeBel J.	Bastarache, Deschamps, Rothstein JJ.
R v Krieger; 2006 SCC 47	Right to trial by jury; jury nullification	None	Unanimous
R v Déry; 2006 SCC 53	Attempted conspiracy	None	Unanimous
R v Angelillo; 2006 SCC 55	Sentencing; fresh evidence	None	Binnie J.
R v Larche; 2006 SCC 56	Sentencing	None	Unanimous
R v Morris; 2006 SCC 59	Aboriginal treaty rights	McLachlin C.J.	None

== 2010 ==
Statistics

XXXXX	Majority or Plurality	XXX	Concurrence	XXXX	Other
XXXX	Dissent	XXXX	Concurrence/dissent	Total =	XXXXXX
Written opinions = XXX		Oral opinions = XXX		Unanimous decisions = XXX

Case name	Issue	Co-authored by	Joined by
XXX; CITATIONS [URL]	XXX	XXX	XXX
XXX; CITATIONS [URL]	XXX	XXX	XXX

== 2011 ==
Statistics

XXXXX	Majority or Plurality	XXX	Concurrence	XXXX	Other
XXXX	Dissent	XXXX	Concurrence/dissent	Total =	XXXXXX
Written opinions = XXX		Oral opinions = XXX		Unanimous decisions = XXX

Case name	Issue	Co-authored by	Joined by
R v Bruce; 2011 SCC 4	Reasonableness of trial verdict	–	–
Smith v Alliance Pipeline Ltd; 2011 SCC 7	Standard of review for Pipeline Arbitration Committee appointed pursuant to the National Energy Board Act	–	McLachlin CJ and Binnie, LeBel, Abella, Charron, Rothstein and Cromwell JJ
R v Miljevic; 2011 SCC 8	Whether trial judge erred in response to jury's questions	–	McLachlin CJ and Deschamps J
R v SD; 2011 SCC 14	Whether the fact the accused was convicted of an offence on a date other than the one referred to in the indictment affected trial fairness	–	–
R v St-Onge; 2011 SCC 16	Whether Court Martial Appeal Court of Canada erred when substituting its own balancing of factors relevant to sentencing for that of a military judge — Whether Supreme Court of Canada has jurisdiction to hear appeal	–	Unanimous
R v JA; 2011 SCC 28	Whether in offence of sexual assault, Criminal Code defines "consent" as requiring conscious, operating mind throughout sexual activity, or whether consent to sexual activity may be given prior to period of unconsciousness	–	Binnie and LeBel JJ
R v EMW; 2011 SCC 31	Jurisdiction of a court of appeal to consider whether there was a miscarriage of justice — Whether there was a miscarriage of justice	–	–
R v Sinclair; 2011 SCC 40	XXX	–	McLachlin CJ and Binnie and Cromwell JJ
Crookes v Newton; 2011 SCC 47	Tort of libel and slander — Whether a hyperlink to an allegedly defamatory article in itself constitutes a publication	McLachlin CJ	–
R v Barros; 2011 SCC 51	Whether investigator hired by the defence is bound by informer privilege — Whether trial judge committed errors of law allowing appellate review of acquittals for offences of obstructing justice and extortion	–	–
Nor-Man Regional Health Authority Inc v Manitoba Association of Health Care Professionals; 2011 SCC 59	Whether a labour arbitration award applying a common law or equitable remedy is reviewable on standard of reasonableness or correctness	–	Unanimous

== 2012 ==
Statistics

6	Majority or Plurality	1	Concurrence	0	Other
3	Dissent	0	Concurrence/dissent	Total =	10
Written opinions = 9		Oral opinions = 1		Unanimous decisions = 3

Case name	Issue	Co-authored by	Joined by
R v RP; 2012 SCC 22	Reasonableness of trial verdict	–	LeBel J
R v Gibbons; 2012 SCC 28	Offence of contempt of court and section 127 of the Criminal Code	–	–
R v Venneri; 2012 SCC 33	Criminal organizations under s. 467 of the Criminal Code and whether possession of cocaine was a foreseeable consequence of conspiring to traffic in cocaine	–	Unanimous
R v Punko; 2012 SCC 39	Issue estoppel	–	–
R v Knott; 2012 SCC 42	Sentencing and whether "imprisonment for a term not exceeding two years" relates only to imprisonment imposed by a sentencing court at a single sitting or an aggregate of all sentences imposed on an offender	–	Unanimous
R v Bellusci; 2012 SCC 44 [URL]	Remedy of a stay of proceedings under s. 24(1) of the Charter on grounds of a s. 7 Charter infringement	–	Unanimous
R v Prokofiew; 2012 SCC 49	Co-accused's counsel inviting jury to infer accused's guilt from a failure to testify, and whether the trial judge's failure to give explicit remedial instruction in charge to jury constituted a legal error under s. 4(6) of the Canada Evidence Act	–	McLachlin CJ and LeBel and Cromwell JJ
R v Rochon; 2012 SCC 50	Parties to offences – Doing or omitting to do anything to aid any person to commit an offence, and whether accused's omission was sufficient to establish that the accused aided the commission of an offence	–	McLachlin CJ and LeBel, Abella, Rothstein and Moldaver JJ (oral)
R v Cole; 2012 SCC 53	Whether a warrantless search and seizure of a laptop computer and disc containing Internet files breached accused right against unreasonable search and seizure under s. 8 of the Charter, and if so, whether the evidence ought to be excluded under s. 24(2) of the Charter; Whether accused had reasonable expectation of privacy in employer-issued work computer	–	McLachlin CJ and LeBel, Rothstein, Cromwell and Moldaver JJ
R v Boudreault; 2012 SCC 56	Offence of care or control of motor vehicle while impaired, and whether risk of danger is an essential element of care or control offences	–	LeBel, Deschamps, Abella, Moldaver and Karakatsanis JJ

== 2013 ==
2013 statistics

6	Majority or Plurality	2	Concurrence	0	Other
6	Dissent	1	Concurrence/dissent	Total =	15
Written opinions = 14		Oral opinions = 1		Unanimous decisions = 3

Case name	Issue	Co-authored by	Joined by
R v O'Brien; 2013 SCC 2	Offence of uttering threats	–	Cromwell, Moldaver and Wagner JJ
R v Manning; 2013 SCC 1	Forfeiture orders	–	Unanimous
R v Ryan; 2013 SCC 3	Criminal defence of duress	–	–
R v Sanichar; 2013 SCC 4	Whether appellate court erred in setting aside convictions and ordering a new trial	–	–
R v Taylor; 2013 SCC 10	Whether trial judge erred in rejecting evidence	–	Cromwell J (oral)
R v Levkovic; 2013 SCC 25	Constitutional challenge of s. 243 of the Criminal Code under s. 7 of the Charter on grounds of vagueness	–	Unanimous
R v Buzizi; 2013 SCC 27	Criminal defence of provocation and whether the defence should have been put to the jury	–	Moldaver and Karakatsanis JJ
R v Gauthier; 2013 SCC 32	Elements of the criminal defence of abandonment	–	–
R v Baldree; 2013 SCC 35	Admissibility of hearsay evidence	–	McLachlin CJ and LeBel, Abella, Rothstein, Cromwell, Karakatsanis and Wagner JJ
Ezokola v Canada (Citizenship and Immigration); 2013 SCC 40	Rejection of refugee applicant on grounds of complicity in crimes against humanity; Whether passive acquiescence is sufficient to establish complicity	LeBel J	Unanimous
Ontario v Criminal Lawyers' Association of Ontario; 2013 SCC 43	Jurisdiction of courts – Whether superior and statutory courts have inherent jurisdiction to determine the rate of remuneration of amici curiae	–	LeBel, Abella and Cromwell JJ
Divito v Canada (Public Safety and Emergency Preparedness); 2013 SCC 47	Constitutional challenge of provisions of the International Transfer of Offenders Act under mobility rights under s. 6(1) of the Charter	LeBel J	McLachlin CJ
R v Pappas; 2013 SCC 56	Defence of provocation	–	–
R v Hay; 2013 SCC 61	Jury charges and eyewitness evidence	–	–
La Souveraine, Compagnie d'assurance générale v Autorité des marchés financiers 2013 SCC 63	Provincial offences and strict liability under the Quebec Act respecting the distribution of financial products and services	–	LeBel J
