= Lord Justice Lloyd =

Lord Justice Lloyd may refer to:

- Tony Lloyd, Baron Lloyd of Berwick (born 1929), Lord of Appeal in Ordinary (1993–1998)
- David Lloyd Jones, Lord Lloyd-Jones (born 1952), Lord Justice of Appeal (2012–present)
- Timothy Lloyd (born 1946), Lord Justice of Appeal (2005–2013)
