= Charles Hall (judge) =

English barrister and judge (1814–1883)

Sir Charles Hall (1814–1883) was an English barrister and judge, who became Vice-Chancellor of England.

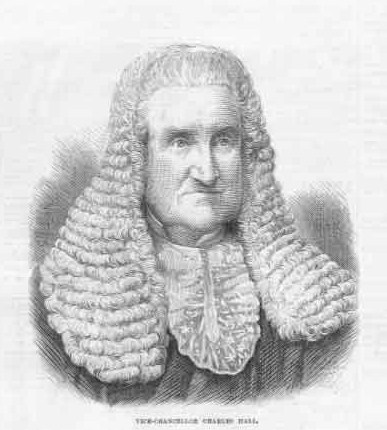
Sir Charles Hall, 1873

== Life ==
The fourth son of John Hall of Manchester and Mary, daughter of John Dobson of Durham, he was born on 14 April 1814. His father, after financial losses by a bank failure, articled him to a solicitor in Manchester. In 1835 he entered the Middle Temple, and read for the bar successively with William Taprell the special pleader, James Russell of the chancery bar, and Lewis Duval the conveyancer. At the end of his year as a pupil he became Duval's principal assistant.

In time Hall succeeded to the bulk of Duval's practice, and through his wife inherited much of his fortune; and lived for the rest of his life in Duval's house at 8 Bayswater Hill (now 150 Baywater Road, and not as sometimes supposed 8 Orme Square). During the next twenty years he became the recognised leader of the junior chancery bar, and the first authority of his day on real property law. Having been called to the bar in Michaelmas term 1838, he built up a large court practice, and his pupils were prominent in the following generation of equity lawyers.

Hall's best known cases were the Bridgewater peerage case in the House of Lords in 1853, the Shrewsbury peerage case, and Allgood v. Blake in the exchequer chamber in 1872. He drew up several bills for Lord Westbury, including his Registration of Titles Act, and assisted Lord Selborne in drafting the Judicature Act 1873. Hall twice refused to take silk. In 1862 he became under-conveyancer and in 1864 conveyancer to the court of chancery, and in 1872 a bencher of his inn. He was raised to the bench in succession to Vice-chancellor John Wickens in November 1873 and knighted. He was transferred to the Chancery Division of the High Court upon the creation of the latter in 1875.

While walking home from his court, Hall was attacked by a stroke of paralysis, in June 1882. He resigned his judgeship before the ensuing Michaelmas sittings, and died on 12 December 1883. He never played any part in politics.

== Family ==
In 1837 Hall married Sarah, daughter of Francis Duval of Exeter and Lewis Duval's niece. He had four sons, two of whom survived him, the younger being Charles Hall the lawyer and politician, and four daughters.

== Notes ==
Attribution

This article incorporates text from a publication now in the public domain: Stephen, Leslie; Lee, Sidney, eds. (1890). "Hall, Charles (1814-1883)". Dictionary of National Biography. Vol. 24. London: Smith, Elder & Co.
