= James Blackett-Ord =

British barrister and judge

Andrew James Blackett-Ord CVO
- Royal coat of arms of the United Kingdom

Vice-Chancellor of the County Palatine of Lancaster

Personal details
- Born: Andrew James Blackett-Ord; 1921 Haltwhistle, Northumberland, England
- Died: 21 February 2012 (aged 90–91) Brough, Cumbria, England
- Spouse: Rosemary Bovill
- Children: 5
- Education: New College, Oxford
- Occupation: Judge
- Profession: Barrister

Andrew James "Jim" Blackett-Ord, CVO (1921 – 21 February 2012) was a British barrister and judge. During World War II he was held for two years as a prisoner of war.

== Early life ==
He was educated at Eton College and New College, Oxford.

== War Service ==
During World War II he was commissioned into the Scots Guards, where in 1943 he met and later became engaged to Rosemary Bovill.

In 1943 he was posted to North Africa, where he later recorded that at one point, he found himself having dinner in a tent alone with King George VI, principally because all of the officers in his regiment had already embarked for Italy. He rejoined the regiment after Anzio landings, where his battalion was routed by the German counterattack. He ordered the remaining men to surrender. His obituary recorded that this act "saved many of their lives, but left him with no glorious military record".

He then spent two years as a German prisoner of war. When he was released at the end of his confinement, he weighed just seven stone, or 98 pounds (44 kg).

== Family ==
After the war, he returned home and married Rosemary. Together they had five children (one of whom died in infancy). In 1951 he inherited his wife's family estate at Helbeck, from the old Warcop family of Breeks, and then a year later in 1952, he inherited his ancestral family home of Whitfield Hall.

== Law ==
Blackett-Ord made his living as a barrister, mainly in conveyancing. He practiced from chambers in London from 1946 to 1972. In 1972 he was appointed Vice-Chancellor of the County Palatine of Lancaster, and returned north to sit as a judge. He was the first person appointed to the post subsequent the Courts Act 1971 coming into force (previously the appointment of the Vice-Chancellor of the County Palatine was controlled by section 14 of the Administration of Justice Act 1881). In the end, he was the only judge after that date to hold the office independently; after he stepped down in 1987, the office has been held by a Justice of the High Court sitting in the Chancery Division.

In a break with tradition he was awarded the Commander of the Royal Victorian Order (CVO) in the 1988 New Year Honours instead of the traditional knighthood when he retired.

== Church ==
Blackett-Ord also served as churchman, a churchwarden and chancellor of Newcastle diocese.
