= Milner Holland =

British lawyer (1902–1969)

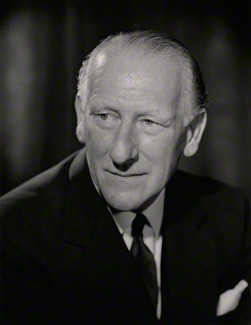
Holland in 1967

Sir Edward Milner Holland KCVO CBE QC (8 September 1902 – 2 November 1969) was a British lawyer. He served as the Attorney-General of the Duchy of Lancaster from 1951 to 1969.

Holland was born in Sutton, Surrey, the second son of the publisher Sir Edward John Holland, and was educated at Charterhouse School and at Hertford College, Oxford, (BA, BCL). He was called to the bar by the Inner Temple in 1927, and practised mainly at the Chancery bar. During World War II, he served in the British Army, rising to the rank of Brigadier and serving as the Deputy Director of Personal Services at the War Office. He was appointed Commander of the Order of the British Empire in 1945.

After the War, Holland returned to the bar and was made Queen's Counsel in 1948. He was appointed Attorney-General of the Duchy of Lancaster in 1951, and held the position until 1969. He was Chairman of the General Council of the Bar between 1957 and 1958 and between 1962 and 1963. He was a member of the Vassall Tribunal in 1963. In 1965 he was appointed Knight Commander of the Royal Victorian Order. Later in his life he refused appointment as a High Court judge.
