= Sydney Donkin =

British civil engineer (1871–1952)

Sydney Bryan Donkin (24 June 1871 – 12 November 1952) was a British civil engineer. His parents were Bryan Donkin Junior and Georgina Dillon. Donkin was educated at University College, London before beginning work for Sulzer Brothers, mechanical engineers, later the Sulzer company. Whilst based at this company's headquarters in Switzerland he became interested in Alpine climbing and spent much of his spare time climbing the nearby peaks. He was a founding member of the Climbers' Club and served on their committee in 1908 and later as vice-president and president.

He later became an assistant to Alexander Kennedy, the electrical engineer, and worked on several large hydro-electric dams including the first Lower Aswan Dam and the Owen Falls Dam. He also sat on the general board of the National Physical Laboratory, as chairman of the Association of Consulting Engineers, president of the Association of Supervisory Electrical Engineers, president of the Institution of Civil Engineers (ICE) and president of the Smeatonian Society of Civil Engineers. He was a proponent of social housing and built the first houses for the ICE Benevolent fund at Haywards Heath.

== Education and apprenticeship ==
Donkin was the great-grandson of Bryan Donkin, the distinguished mechanical engineer and industrialist and the grandson of John Donkin. He was educated at University College, London, from which he graduated with a degree in engineering. He served an apprenticeship first with the family firm of Bryan Donkin and Company, of Bermondsey, of which his father, Bryan Donkin Jr., was then chairman. This was where his father had carried out classic scientific boiler trials with Sir Alexander Kennedy, in 1887–88. He completed his apprenticeship (1889–1893) by spending a year in Switzerland about 9 months of which was with Sulzer company, a firm of mechanical engineers based at Winterthur in Switzerland. On returning to England in 1893 he rejoined Bryan Donkin & Company as a draughtsman, later becoming assistant to the manager.

== Mountain climbing ==
Donkin first began climbing when working in Switzerland with Sulzer Brothers. A cousin, William Frederick Donkin, had been a famed climber and secretary of the Alpine Club who died on a climb in the Caucasus in 1888. He soon became an enthusiast and climbed many of the Alpine peaks including Matterhorn, Monte Rosa, Zinalrothorn, Dent Blanche and the Dom as well as several mountains of North Wales. He made many of his ascents without a local guide and took most of his summer holidays in the Alps. He became a founding member of the Climbers' Club in 1898 and served on their committee in 1908–11, 1929–36 and 1939–43. He was elected vice-president for 1926-9 and president 1936-9.

== Electrical engineer ==
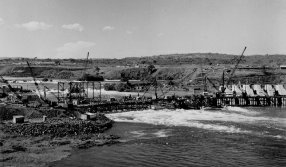
The Owen Falls Dam under construction

In 1897 he left the family firm to become an Assistant Engineer at Kennedy and Jenkin, working with Alexander Kennedy, the famed electrical engineer and another keen climber, and worked within his consultancy. He was made a partner in the business in 1908 and became the senior partner in 1934 on the retirement of John MacFarlane Kennedy, son of the founder. Donkin worked heavily in hydro-electric power and was involved in several large scale projects. Amongst these were the Aswan Low Dam on the Nile in Egypt which was built between 1899 and 1902 and the Owen Falls Dam on the White Nile in Uganda which was started in 1947 and finished two years after his death.

Donkin had a seat on the general board of the National Physical Laboratory from 1922 to 1927. He was one of the original consultants for the planning and construction of the National Grid, and was responsible for the design and construction of approximately half of the hydro-electric stations and distribution systems commissioned by the North of Scotland Hydro-Electric Board. Because of his great interest in mountain climbing, in 1928 he urged his assistants working on the design of the grid system that the pylons should be simple in design and positioned so as to do the least environmental damage. He was chairman of the Association of Consulting Engineers for two terms, first in 1927–28, and again in 1943–44. He acted as an adviser to the government on a proposed Severn barrage scheme, and was personally responsible for the crucial technical appendices of the report (HMSO 1945). Donkin also served as president of the Association of Supervisory Electrical Engineers from 1925 until 1931 and as president of the Institution of Civil Engineers for 1937 to 1938. He assisted the Ministry of Labour in their preparations for the Second World War by volunteering his services as chairman of the engineering section of the National Register of Scientists, Technical Experts and Professional Men which was established to allow the government to better use the skills of these men for the war effort. In the 1930s he became interested in uses for the heated water generated by power stations and this was the subject of his presidential address to the Institution of Civil Engineers in 1937. After the war he devised a way of using it to heat homes and businesses which was put into use on a housing estate in Pimlico. He erected a working model of it in his home in Surrey. He was made a Fellow of University College, London in 1946. In 1949 he was elected as president of the Smeatonian Society of Civil Engineers, of which he had become a member in 1931.

== Personal life ==
He was married to Phoebe Smiles in 1902, whilst working in England for Alexander Kennedy. He was a keen proponent of the provision of social housing and in this interest founded the Institution of Civil Engineers Benevolent Fund housing scheme in July 1937 with the construction of houses at Haywards Heath for members and their families in need. Donkin died at Albury, Surrey on 12 November 1952 at the age of 81. His wife had predeceased him by eight months.

Professional and academic associations
Preceded by Alexander Gibb	President of the Institution of Civil Engineers; November 1937 – November 1938	Succeeded by William Binnie
