= Alastair Norris =

British judge

Sir Alastair Norris
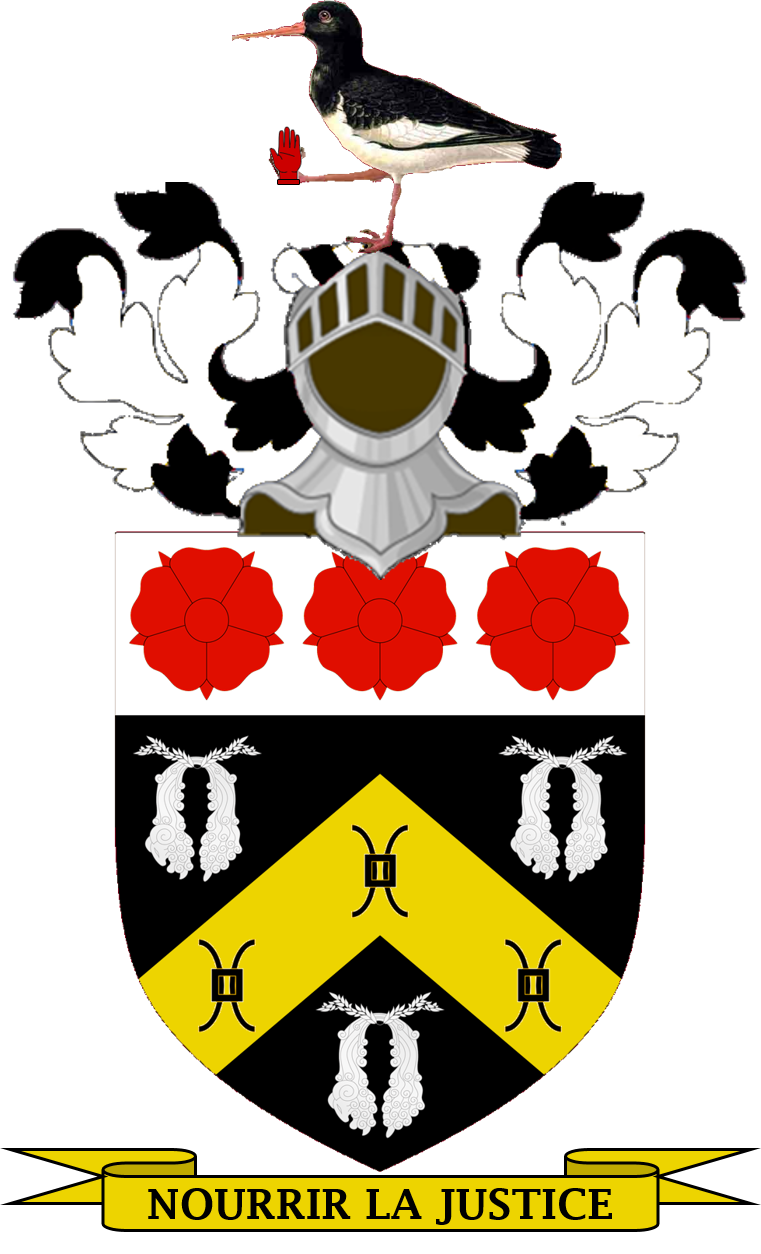

Justice of the High Court
- Incumbent
- Assumed office 2007

Vice-Chancellor of the County Palatine of Lancaster

Personal details
- Born: 17 December 1950 (age 75)
- Education: St John's College, Cambridge
- Occupation: Judge
- Profession: legal

Sir Alastair Hubert Norris (born 17 December 1950), styled The Hon. Mr Justice Norris, is a judge of the High Court of England and Wales.

He was educated at Pate's Grammar School and St John's College, Cambridge.

He was called to the bar at Lincoln's Inn in 1973. He has been a judge of the High Court of Justice (Chancery Division) since 2007. In 2018 he was knighted and granted a coat of arms by letters patent.

== Blazon ==
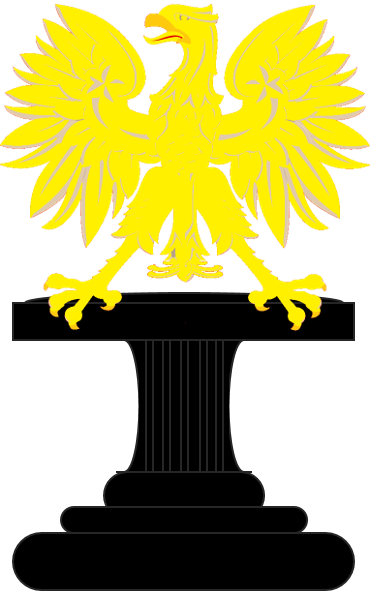
Norris's badge

- Arms: Sable on a Chevron Or between three Fleeces Argent three Millrinds Sable on a Chief Argent three Roses Gules.
- Crest: Upon a Helm with a Wreath Argent and Sable An Oystercatcher proper holding in the dexter foot a sinister Hand appaumy couped at the wrist Gules.
- Badge: Standing on a Capstan Sable an Eagle displayed Or.
