= Richard McCombe =

English barrister

The Right Honourable Sir Richard McCombe

Lord Justice of Appeal
- In office 26 October 2012 – 27 January 2021

Personal details
- Born: 23 September 1952 (age 74)
- Education: Downing College, Cambridge

Sir Richard George Bramwell McCombe, PC (born 23 September 1952) is an English barrister and former member of the Court of Appeal of England and Wales.

McCombe attended Sedbergh School and Downing College, Cambridge. He was called to the Bar in 1975 (Lincoln's Inn) and elected a bencher in 1996. He was second junior counsel to the Director-General of Fair Trading from 1982 to 1987, when he became first junior counsel, serving until 1989. The same year, he was made a Queen's Counsel. McCombe and Price Waterhouse executive John Heywood led an investigation into Norton Group, plc for the Department of Trade and Industry.

He became an Assistant Recorder in 1993 and a Recorder in 1996. He was appointed a Deputy High Court judge in 1999. From 1996 to 2001, he served as Attorney-General of the Duchy of Lancaster. He was appointed to the High Court on 11 January 2001, Receiving the customary knighthood, and was assigned to the Queen's Bench Division. He served as Presiding Judge on the Northern Circuit from 2004 to 2007 and Chair of the Association of High Court Judges from 2008 to 2009. On 26 October 2012, he was appointed a Lord Justice of Appeal And received the customary appointment to the Privy Council. He retired from the Court of Appeal with effect from 27 January 2021.

In 2011, McCombe passed judgement in the Hookway case, which had a significant effect on bail in England and Wales. The Police and Criminal Evidence Act 1984 stipulations on bail had previously been interpreted to mean that the time limits on holding a prisoner in police custody applied only to the time the prisoner was physically in custody. In the Hookway case, McCombe ruled that the custody time limits included the time the suspect was on bail, effectively limiting the maximum amount of time a suspect could be on bail to 96 hours (less the time spent in the police station). This decision caused significant disruption in the criminal justice system, and drew criticism. Michael Zander called McCombe as "a fool" and a senior police officer described the decision as causing "chaos". The Supreme Court offered to stay the decision ahead of an appeal by the police, but the government instead passed emergency legislation to reverse the change – the Police (Detention and Bail) Act 2011.

He was the presiding judge in the case concerning elderly torture victims in the Mau Mau Uprising, in which McCombe repeatedly ruled in their favour against the British government, paving the way for their eventual compensation. He also presided over the trial of Sharon Matthews and Michael Donovan for the kidnapping of Shannon Matthews in 2008.

Sir Richard is married to Jill Black, Lady Black of Derwent, a former Justice of the Supreme Court of the United Kingdom.

== Arms ==
Coat of arms of Richard McCombe
Motto Do It

== See also ==
- List of Lords Justices of Appeal
