= Cumberland and Westmorland Herald =

Newspaper printed and sold in Cumbria, England

Cumberland & Westmorland Herald
- Type: Weekly newspaper
- Format: Broadsheet
- Headquarters: Penrith
- ISSN: 1357-2164
- OCLC number: 500342714
- Website: www.cwherald.com

The Cumberland & Westmorland Herald (formerly The Penrith Herald, The Appleby and Kirkby Stephen Herald, and The Mid Cumberland and North Westmorland Herald over the years) is a local newspaper in Cumbria, England.

Established in 1860, the Herald is an independent weekly broadsheet newspaper covering a large area of Cumbria, including the towns of Penrith, Appleby-in-Westmorland, Kirkby Stephen, Keswick and Alston mainly corresponding to Eden district and part of Allerdale borough.

The newspaper is published weekly on a Saturday, though some shops in Penrith sell it on a Friday evening, with a circulation of approximately 15,910 copies. The Herald was printed at the CN Group's works at Carlisle until 2018. Since CN Group was taken over by Newsquest, it is printed in Glasgow.

In April 2013, the paper won "Weekly Newspaper Of the Year", at the National Newspaper Awards, and was congratulated by local MP Tim Farron and David Simpson MP at the House of Commons.

In 2025 the Herald's North Lakes Living magazine won "Supplement of the Year" at the Regional Press Awards.

The company went into administration in February 2020, and was bought by local engineer Andy Barr, through Barrnon Media Limited, which also owns the Keswick Reminder and the Teesdale Mercury.

== See also ==
- Cumbrian Newspapers Group Ltd v Cumberland & Westmorland Herald Newspaper & Printing Co Ltd [1986] BCLC 286, a famous legal case relating to the newspaper
