= Terence Etherton, Baron Etherton =

British judge (1951–2025)

The Right Honourable The Lord Etherton GBE PC KC
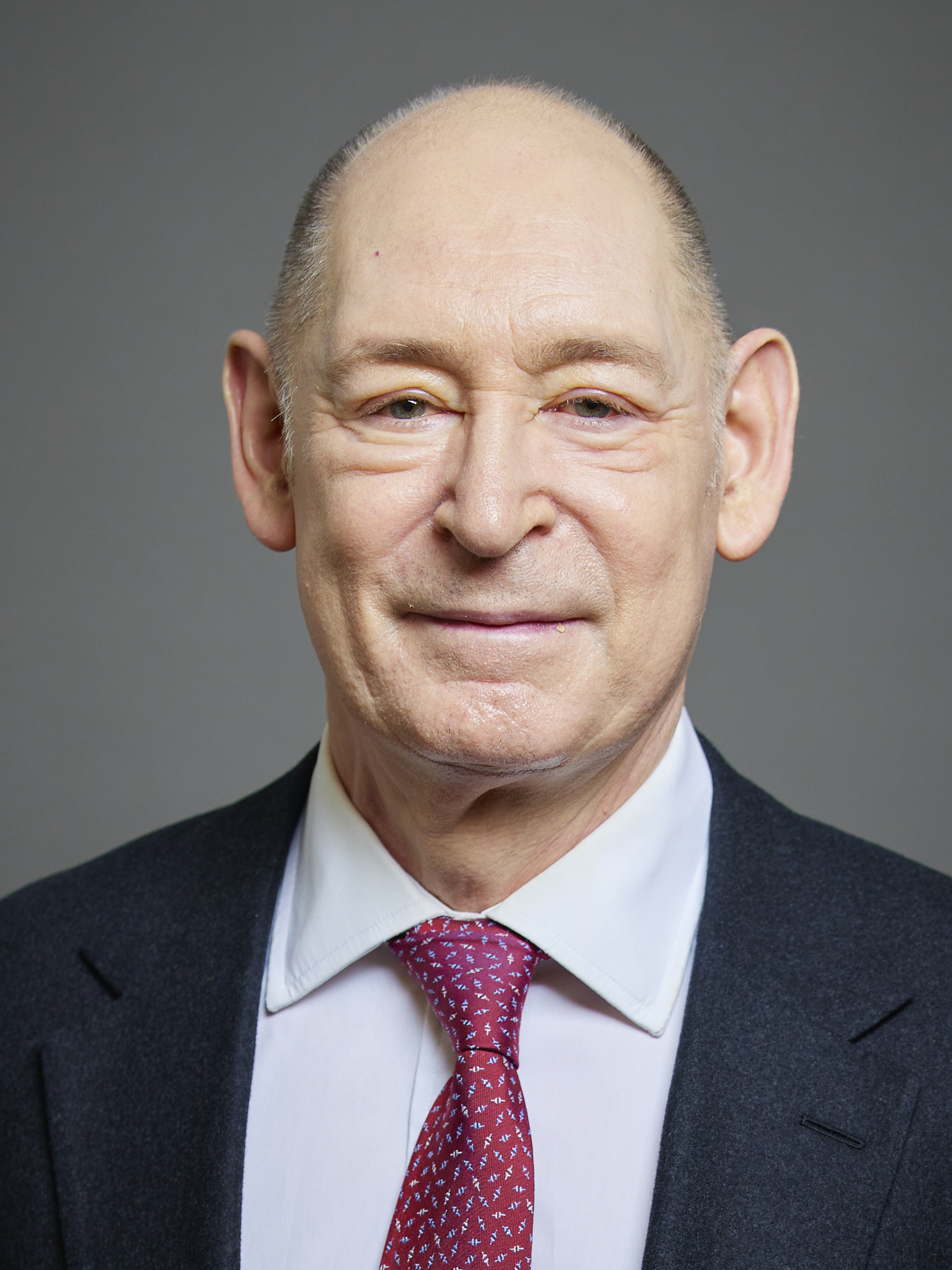
- Official portrait, 2023

Master of the Rolls
- In office 3 October 2016 – 11 January 2021
- Monarch: Elizabeth II
- Preceded by: Lord Dyson
- Succeeded by: Sir Geoffrey Vos

Chancellor of the High Court
- In office 11 January 2013 – 3 October 2016
- Preceded by: Sir Andrew Morritt
- Succeeded by: Sir Geoffrey Vos

Lord Justice of Appeal
- In office 29 September 2008 – 11 January 2013
- Nominated by: Gordon Brown as Prime Minister
- Appointed by: Elizabeth II

Member of the House of Lords
- Lord Temporal
- Life peerage 23 December 2020 – 6 May 2025

Personal details
- Born: Terence Michael Elkan Barnet Etherton; 21 June 1951 London, England
- Died: 6 May 2025 (aged 73)
- Party: None (crossbencher)
- Spouse: Andrew Stone
- Education: Corpus Christi College, Cambridge
- Occupation: Judge

Terence Michael Elkan Barnet Etherton, Baron Etherton (21 June 1951 – 6 May 2025) was a British judge and member of the House of Lords. He served as the Master of the Rolls and Head of Civil Justice from 2016 to 2021 and Chancellor of the High Court from 2013 to 2016.

== Early life ==
His grandparents moved from the pale of settlement in Russia to the East End of London in the early 20th century.

Etherton attended Holmewood House School and St Paul's School, and studied history and law at Corpus Christi College, Cambridge. He was a member of the British fencing team (sabre) from 1977 to 1980 and was selected to compete at the 1980 Summer Olympics in Moscow, but joined the boycott in protest against the 1979 Soviet invasion of Afghanistan.

== Legal career ==
Etherton was called to the bar (Gray's Inn) in 1974 and became a Queen's Counsel in 1990. He was appointed a High Court judge on 11 January 2001 and assigned to the Chancery Division, receiving the customary knighthood. In August 2006, he was appointed Chairman of the Law Commission, the statutory independent body created by the Law Commissions Act 1965 to keep the law under review and to recommend reform where needed.

On 29 September 2008, on expansion of the Court of Appeal from 37 to 38 judges, Etherton was appointed a Lord Justice of Appeal. He was sworn in on 29 September 2008, and received the customary appointment to the Privy Council. On 11 January 2013, he was appointed Chancellor of the High Court.

On 3 October 2016, Etherton succeeded Lord Dyson as Master of the Rolls.

In October 2016, Etherton was one of the three judges forming the divisional court of the High Court in case of R (Miller) v Secretary of State for Exiting the European Union, which concerned the use of the royal prerogative for the issue of notification in accordance with Article 50 of the Treaty on European Union (the Lisbon Treaty). His role in this judgment meant that he appeared in an infamous front-cover of the Daily Mail (Enemies of the People), and in a move which was widely seen as attacking his homosexuality, the Mail Online chastised Etherton for being an "openly-gay ex-Olympic fencer". The reference was swiftly removed, though without apology.

In June 2019, Etherton, Sir Stephen Irwin and Sir Rabinder Singh found that ministers had breached British law when they "made no concluded assessments of whether the Saudi-led coalition had committed violations of international humanitarian law in the past, during the Yemen conflict, and made no attempt to do so."

== House of Lords ==
In December 2020, it was announced that Etherton would be created a crossbench life peer in the 2020 Political Peerages. On 23 December 2020, he was created Baron Etherton, of Marylebone in the City of Westminster.

In May 2022, Lord Etherton was appointed by the Government to carry out an independent review of the treatment of LGBT military personnel between 1967 and 2000. His report was published in July 2023.

In the 2024 Birthday Honours, Etherton was appointed Knight Grand Cross of the Order of the British Empire (GBE) for services to LGBT veterans.

== Personal life and death ==
Etherton entered a civil partnership in 2006. On his appointment as Lord Justice of Appeal in 2008, he said, "My appointment also shows that diversity in sexuality is not a bar to preferment up to the highest levels of the judiciary".

On 10 December 2014, pursuant to legislation allowing couples in civil partnerships to convert the relationship to marriage, Etherton and his civil partner Andrew Stone were married in a Reform Judaism wedding ceremony at West London Synagogue.

Etherton died on 6 May 2025, at the age of 73. He was survived by his husband, Andrew Stone.

Coat of arms of Terence Etherton, Baron Etherton

Notes
Granted by Sir Thomas Woodcock on 25 May 2021. College reference: Grants 183/249
Motto
Hineini (Here I Am)

== Notes and references ==
Legal offices
Preceded by Lord Dyson	Master of the Rolls; 2016–2021	Succeeded by Sir Geoffrey Vos
Preceded by Sir Andrew Morritt	Chancellor of the High Court; 2013–2016	Succeeded by Sir Geoffrey Vos
