= Bugle-Observer =

Canadian newspaper in New Brunswick

The Bugle-Observer

- Type: Biweekly newspaper
- Format: Broadsheet
- Owner: Postmedia Network
- Publisher: James K. Irving
- Price: $1.00 CAD Monday to Friday $1.50 CAD Saturday; Not published on Sunday
- Website: telegraphjournal.com/bugle-observer/

The Bugle-Observer is a newspaper based in Woodstock, New Brunswick, which provides local news to Carleton and York Counties. The paper publishes twice weekly, on Tuesday and a weekend edition on Friday.

== History ==
Woodstock's newspaper began as two papers, The Bugle and The Observer in the neighbouring town of Hartland. The papers merged to become the Bugle-Observer and now provides Carleton County with the latest news and events. In 2008 The Bugle-Observer celebrated its 100th anniversary in the Woodstock market, one of the oldest newspapers in New Brunswick. The Bugle-Observer is published Tuesday and the Bugle-Observer Weekend is distributed Friday.

The paper is owned by Postmedia Network. The paper has gone by the name of The Bugle since it began in 1963 until it was sold to Brunswick News in 2003. When the Bugle began there was a rival newspaper called The Sentinel Press. Soon after the merge, a competing paper, called the Carleton Free Press was established by its former publisher, Ken Langdon. That paper folded after a year.

In 2022, the Bugle-Observer was sold along with other Brunswick News brands to Postmedia Network.

== See also ==
- List of newspapers in Canada
