= Timothy Lloyd =

English judge

Sir Timothy Andrew Wigram Lloyd, PC (born 30 November 1946) is an English former judge who was a member of the Court of Appeal.

Lloyd was educated at Winchester College and Lincoln College, Oxford. He was called to the bar (Middle Temple) in 1970 and was appointed a QC in 1986. He was appointed Attorney-General of the Duchy of Lancaster in 1993, he was made a judge of the High Court on 1 October 1996, receiving the customary knighthood, and assigned to the Chancery Division.

He served as Vice-Chancellor of the County Palatine of Lancaster, a Chancery judge appointed by the Chancellor of the Duchy of Lancaster on the advice of the Lord Chancellor to supervise Chancery business in the North.

He was appointed a Lord Justice of Appeal on 6 April 2005 and was in consequence named to the Privy Council of the United Kingdom. He retired on 1 October 2013.
