= Attorney-General of the Duchy of Lancaster =

The Attorney-General of the Duchy of Lancaster is the law officer of the Crown for matters arising in the Duchy of Lancaster.

== Attorneys-General ==
- 1478–1483: Richard Empson
- 1519–1522: John Hales
- 1522–1526: Edmund Knightley
- 1526–1531: Thomas Audley
- 1531–1535: Robert Wroth
- 1535–1536: John Baker
- 1538–1540: William Coningsby
- 1544–1566: John Caryll
- 1566–1580: George Bromley
- 1580–1613: Sir John Brograve
- 1614–1638: Sir Edward Mosley
- 1638–1644: Sir Thomas Bedingfield
- 1644–1649: Bulstrode Whitelocke
- 1649–1654: Bartholomew Hall
- 1654–1660: Nicholas Lechmere
- 1660–1688: John Heath
- 1689–1714: Edward Northey
- 1714–1722: Alexander Denton
- 1727–1728: Spencer Cowper
- 1733–1736?: Thomas Abney
- 1758–1763: Fletcher Norton
- 1770–1777: John Skynner
- 1777–1810: John Ord
- 1810-1833: William Walton
- 1833-1839: William Russell
- 1839-1861: Thomas Flower Ellis
- 1861-1893: Henry Wyndham West
- 1893–1895: Samuel Hall
- 1895-1899: William Ambrose
- 1899-1921: Robert Alfred McCall
- 1921–1946: Sir Joseph Herbert Cunliffe
- 1946–1947: David Jenkins
- 1947–1951: Gerald Upjohn
- 1951–1969: Sir Milner Holland
- 1969–1970: John Brightman
- 1970–1972: Sydney Templeman
- 1972–1975: Christopher Slade
- 1976–1980: Thomas Bingham
- 1980–1984: Richard Scott
- 1984-1986: John Knox
- 1986-1989: Donald Rattee
- 1989-1991: Jonathan Parker
- 1991–1993: Mary Arden
- 1993–1996: Timothy Lloyd
- 1996–2001: Richard McCombe
- 2001–2006: Michael Briggs
- 2006–2012: Robert Hildyard
- 2012–2020: Robert Miles
- 2020–present Sonia Tolaney
