= John Donkin =

British engineer (1802–1854)

John Donkin (1802–1854) was a British engineer. He was a son of Bryan Donkin and worked in his father's company in Bermondsey, primarily on paper-making equipment. He married Caroline Hawes, granddaughter of William Hawes, a founder of the Royal Humane Society. Caroline Hawes was the sister of Sir Benjamin Hawes, brother-in-law of Isambard Kingdom Brunel.

John Donkin was the father of Bryan Donkin Junior and grandfather of Sydney Donkin. He was first cousin of William Fishburn Donkin.

== Sources ==
- Stephen, Leslie, ed. (1888). "Donkin, Bryan" . Dictionary of National Biography. Vol. 15. London: Smith, Elder & Co.
- Grace's Guide Accessed 28 June 2013
