= Eley v Positive Government Security Life Assurance Co Ltd =

UK company law case

Eley v Positive Government Ltd
- Court: Court of Appeal
- Citation: (1876) 1 Ex D 88

Court membership
- Judges sitting: Lord Cairns LC; Lord Coleridge; Mellish LJ

Case opinions
- Lord Cairns LC

Eley v Positive Government Security Life Assurance Co Ltd (1876) 1 Ex D 88 is a UK company law case, concerning a company's articles of association as a contract between member and company.

== Facts ==
Article 118 of the constitution of Positive Government Ltd stated ‘Mr William Eley of 27 New Broad Street, City of London, shall be the solicitor to the company…’. Eley in fact drafted the articles. But then the company never employed him as its solicitor. He was a member, but he brought an action to enforce the articles in his capacity as a solicitor.

The Exchequer Division held the articles did not create any contract between Eley and the company.

== Judgment ==
In the Court of Appeal, Lord Cairns LC affirmed the decision and held, Mr Eley had the right to sue only in his capacity as member, not as solicitor. His brief judgment was as follows.

I wish to say, in the first place, that in my opinion a contract of the kind suggested to exist in this case ought not to receive any particular favour from the Court. The statement is that Baylis was endeavouring to form a joint stock insurance company upon a new principle, and applied to the plaintiff to make advances to meet the expenses of setting up the company, and it was arranged between them that in the event of the company being formed the plaintiff should be appointed permanent solicitor to the company. That is to say, a bargain is made between a professional man and Baylis which, so far as the case is concerned, does not appear to have been communicated to those who were invited to join the company, that if the former will advance money for the formation of the company, he shall be appointed permanent solicitor, and the company shall be obliged to employ him as their professional adviser. When the articles are prepared, they are so by the plaintiff, and in them he inserts a clause which no doubt informs those who signed the articles of the arrangement, but does not appear to have been brought to the notice of those who joined from receiving circulars. This, I repeat, is not a proceeding which the Court would encourage in any way.

I also wish to reserve my judgment as to whether a clause of this kind is obnoxious to the principles by which the Courts are governed in deciding on questions of public policy; but it does appear to me a grave question whether a contract under which a solicitor is not bound to give any particular services, but the company, on the other hand, are bound to employ him for all their business, and to continue to do so, however incompetent he may prove to be in point of physical health or otherwise, until they can convict him of some positive misconduct, is a contract which the Courts would enforce. I prefer to reserve my judgment on the validity of such an agreement until a case arises which calls for a decision on that point.

This case was first rested on the 118th Article. Articles of association, as is well known, follow the memorandum, which states the objects of the company, while the articles state the arrangement between the members. They are an agreement inter socios, and in that view, if the introductory words are applied to Art. 118, it becomes a covenant between the parties to it that they will employ the plaintiff. Now, so far as that is concerned, it is res inter alios acta, the plaintiff is no party to it. No doubt he thought that by inserting it he was making his employment safe as against the company; but his relying on that view of the law does not alter the legal effect of the articles. This article is either a stipulation which would bind the members, or else a mandate to the directors. In either case it is a matter between the directors and shareholders, and not between them and the plaintiff.

The matter has been put in another way. It is said, this, though not an agreement in itself, is at all events a statement of what had been agreed upon; it must have been intended to be brought to the plaintiff's knowledge, he has accepted and acted upon it, and therefore it is evidence of another agreement on which he can rely. Now it may be considered that Art. 118 would have warranted the directors in entering into an agreement with the plaintiff by which they should contract to employ the plaintiff; but I ask, was such a contract ever made? A joint stock company may act under their seal, or by the signature of their directors, which may have equal effect as their seal, or possibly by a resolution of the board. Nothing of the kind exists here; and if the article is not an agreement on which the plaintiff can rely, there is nothing in the case before us but the fact of his employment, and that would entitle him to remuneration only for work he has done. This seems to us to dispose of the whole of the case; and I think that, irrespective of any question on the Statute of Frauds, the judgment of the Court below must be affirmed.

Lord Coleridge and Mellish LJ concurred.

== See also ==
- UK company law
