= Carleton Free Press =

Defunct Canadian newspaper

- Type: Weekly newspaper
- Owners: Dwight Fraser; Ken Langdon
- Publisher: Ken Langdon
- Founded: 2007; 19 years ago
- Ceased publication: October 28, 2008; 17 years ago
- Headquarters: Prague
- City: Woodstock, New Brunswick
- Country: Canada
- Website: carletonfreepress.ca

The Carleton Free Press is a defunct Canadian weekly newspaper that was published twice a week in Woodstock, New Brunswick.

It covered Carleton County and the upper Saint John River valley and was owned by local entrepreneur Dwight Fraser and its publisher was Ken Langdon.

The first weekly edition was released on October 31, 2007, and its last edition was released on October 28, 2008.

The Carleton Free Press was available free of charge until December 31, 2007. The price of its final edition was $1.25 per issue.

The paper ceased publication allegedly due to 'unfair competition' by its competitor Brunswick News publication the Bugle-Observer which was selling at $.25 an issue through the use of coupons.

== Controversy ==
One of the co-owners of the Carleton Free Press and its publisher, Ken Langdon, was a former publisher of the competing Bugle-Observer.

Langdon's departure from his position at the Bugle-Observer was the focus of a controversial court action by his former employer, Brunswick News, which has accused him of holding information that might unfairly benefit the Carleton Free Press.

The battle over the Carleton Free Press started on September 27, 2007, when a team of four forensic accountants hired by CanadaEast News Inc., a media holding company owned by industrial conglomerate J.D. Irving Limited, barged into Langdon's home in Woodstock with a search warrant. The search by the forensic accountants was authorized under a rarely used power of the civil courts relating to industrial espionage, commonly called an Anton Piller order, coupled with an injunction. "They even rooted through my wife's lingerie drawer," Langdon said.

Days before the search, citing a poor relationship with his immediate supervisor, Langdon had resigned his post after four years as publisher of the Bugle-Observer, a paper owned by Brunswick News. In his resignation letter, Langdon expressed his intent to start a new paper.

"During my last weeks in the employ of the Irvings, I consulted with a lawyer who advised me that I had grounds for a constructive dismissal suit," wrote Langdon in the Carleton Free Press' first editorial. "Subsequently I sent to my home files that I could use as part of that suit."

The Irvings allege those files contained confidential commercial information. They were able to secure a court injunction to search Langdon's home while attempting to block the publication of the Carleton Free Press.

Langdon was exonerated by a New Brunswick court on all charges. On November 2, 2007, Justice Peter Glennie of the province's top court blocked the Irvings' request to halt the publication of the Carleton Free Press, while prohibiting Langdon from using confidential Brunswick News information. "In this province, the Irvings are connected to their monopoly in the forestry sector," Jeannot Volpe, leader of New Brunswick's Conservative Party, the official opposition, told IPS.

"I've been to events concerning this sector with hundreds of people which no one from the Irving papers covered. People are starting to get frustrated: how is our voice going to be heard if the media won't report the message?" said Volpe, whose party normally takes the side of big business.

While media rights activists are hopeful about the Carleton Free Press, Irving still dominates the province's public sphere. The company has big plans in the works, including a seven-billion-billion dollar oil refinery and a new liquefied natural gas facility and pipeline in the city of Saint John.

These mega-projects have raised the ire of environmentalists who say the province should be decreasing rather than increasing its production of greenhouse gases. "There is no credible reporting by anyone who understands the science behind these proposals," said Inka Milewski, science advisor to the Conservation Council of New Brunswick.

"There is no credible capacity of any Irving media outlets to cover these stories," Milewski told IPS.

"Media concentration is worse in Canada than in other industrialised countries -- and in New Brunswick, way worse," Robert Picard, a U.S. media economics expert, told a 2003 conference in Moncton, New Brunswick.

== Similar tactics used by Brunswick News ==
HERE, a tabloid-style weekly magazine, was New Brunswick's sole independent English language publication up until 2004, when the Irvings opened a competing "alternative" weekly called the Metro Marquee. While HERE had been publishing successfully for four years, the independent publication couldn't compete with the ad rates of the new Irving competitor and HERE's owners were forced to sell out to the monopoly rather than face financial ruin.

The Irvings closed down the Metro Marquee upon purchasing HERE and changed the paper from a staff-driven organisation to a freelance model, with most writers receiving 25 dollars per article and 10 dollars per photo.

On October 18, HERE, an Irving-owned weekly which bills itself as "New Brunswick's Urban Voice", ran a cover story titled "Why not choose natural gas?" HERE normally requires its cover stories to be at least 1,000 words; the natural gas cover clocked in at 302. The article, which reads like a press release from a natural gas company, ran without listing its author, which also violates the magazine's normal guidelines.
