= Richard Scott, Baron Scott of Foscote =

British judge

The Right Honourable The Lord Scott of Foscote PC
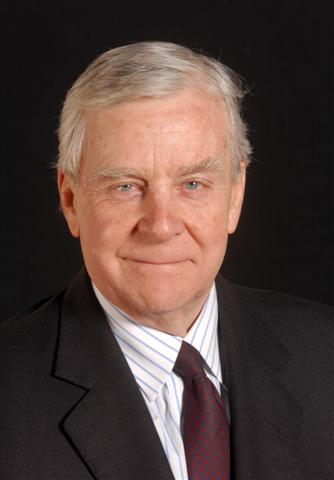

Lord of Appeal in Ordinary
- In office 17 July 2000 – 30 September 2009
- Monarch: Elizabeth II
- Preceded by: The Lord Phillips of Worth Matravers
- Succeeded by: Position abolished

Member of the House of Lords
- Lord Temporal
- Lord of Appeal in Ordinary; 17 July 2000 – 21 December 2016

Vice-Chancellor of the High Court
- In office 1994–2000
- Preceded by: Sir Donald Nicholls
- Succeeded by: Sir Andrew Morritt

Personal details
- Born: Richard Rashleigh Folliott Scott; 2 October 1934 (age 92) Dehradun, India
- Spouse(s): Rima Elisa Ripoll (m. 1959); 4 children
- Education: University of Cape Town; Trinity College, Cambridge
- Occupation: Jurist
- Profession: Barrister

Richard Rashleigh Folliott Scott, Baron Scott of Foscote, PC (born 2 October 1934) is a British judge, who formerly held the office of Lord of Appeal in Ordinary.

== Early life ==
The son of Lieutenant-Colonel C. W. F. and Katharine Scott, Scott was born on 2 October 1934 and educated at Michaelhouse School, Natal in South Africa. He then studied at the University of Cape Town, where he received a Bachelor of Arts degree in 1954, and Trinity College, Cambridge, where he received a B.A (Law Tripos) in 1957 and a Blue in rugby. He then spent a year as Bigelow Fellow at the University of Chicago, where he met his future wife, Rima Elisa Ripoll, who is from Panama.

== Legal career ==
Scott was called to the bar by the Inner Temple in 1959, becoming a Bencher in 1981. From 1960 to 1983, he practised at the Chancery Bar, and was appointed a Queen's Counsel in 1975. In 1980, Scott was appointed Attorney-General of the Duchy of Lancaster, a post he held until 1983. He was Vice-Chairman of the Bar from 1981 to 1982, and chairman from 1982 to 1983.

Scott was appointed a judge of the High Court of Justice in 1983, sitting in the Chancery Division, and received the customary knighthood. From 1987 to 1991, he held the office of Vice-Chancellor of the County Palatine of Lancaster, which has responsibility for overseeing Chancery business in the North of England. He was promoted to the Court of Appeal in 1991, becoming a Lord Justice of Appeal and receiving an appointment to the Privy Council, and serving as Vice-Chancellor, the head of the Chancery Division, from 1994 to 2000, and Head of Civil Justice from 1995 to 2000.

On 17 July 2000, he was appointed a Lord of Appeal in Ordinary and created a life peer as Baron Scott of Foscote, of Foscote in the County of Buckinghamshire. He retired from this post on 30 September 2009, and did not transfer along with the other Lords of Appeal of ordinary to the new Supreme Court of the United Kingdom. The vacancy on the bench his retirement created was filled by Lord Clarke of Stone-cum-Ebony, previously Master of the Rolls. He sat as a crossbencher until his retirement from the House of Lords on 21 December 2016.

In 2003, he was appointed a non-permanent member of Hong Kong's Court of Final Appeal, and while serving there, he is known by his Chinese name (Chinese: 施廣智). He left the court in 2012.

Notable judicial decisions of Lord Scott included:

- Cumbrian Newspapers Group Ltd v Cumberland & Westmorland Herald Newspaper & Printing Co Ltd [1986] BCLC 286 - leading authority on class rights of shares
- Royal Bank of Scotland plc v Etridge (No 2) [2001] UKHL 44 - leading case on the circumstances under which actual and presumed undue influence can be argued to vitiate consent to a contract
- Cobbe v Yeoman's Row Management Ltd [2008] UKHL 55 - on promissory estoppel in the context of negotiations proceedings the formation of a contract

== Scott Inquiry ==
In 1992, Scott, while a Lord Justice of Appeal, was appointed to chair an inquiry into the Arms-to-Iraq scandal, in which it was claimed the British government had supported British companies in selling defence equipment to Iraq. The report was published in 1996, although much of it was secret. In 2001, Scott said it was "regrettable and disappointing" the Government had not made changes to the law regulating the arms trade.

== Personal life ==
Lord Scott has been married to Rima Elisa Ripoll since 1959. They have two sons and two daughters.

Legal offices
| Preceded by Sir Donald Nicholls | Vice-Chancellor; 1994–2000 | Succeeded by Sir Andrew Morritt |
