= Andrew Morritt =

Former British judge (born 1938)

The Right Honourable Sir Andrew Morritt CVO

Chancellor of the High Court Vice-Chancellor of the Supreme Court (2000–2005)
- In office 17 July 2000 – 10 January 2013
- Preceded by: The Lord Scott of Foscote
- Succeeded by: Sir Terence Etherton

Lord Justice of Appeal
- In office 3 October 1994 – 17 July 2000

Justice of the High Court

Personal details
- Born: 5 February 1938 (age 88)

Sir Robert Andrew Morritt, CVO (born 5 February 1938), is a former British judge who served as Chancellor of the High Court of England and Wales.

== Life and career ==
Morritt was educated at Eton College and Magdalene College, Cambridge, and was called to the bar at Lincoln's Inn in 1962. He was appointed Queen's Counsel in 1977 and was Attorney-General to the Prince of Wales from 1978 to 1988.

On 15 April 1988, he was appointed a Justice of the High Court, receiving the customary knighthood, and assigned to the Chancery Division. He served from 1991 to 1994 as Vice-Chancellor of the County Palatine of Lancaster, the judge responsible for Chancery Division business in the North and North East of England. On 3 October 1994, he was appointed to the Court of Appeal, and received the customary appointment to the Privy Council.

He was appointed Vice-Chancellor of the Supreme Court (in effect the head of the Chancery Division of the High Court) on 17 July 2000. On 1 October 2005, his title was changed to Chancellor of the High Court under the provisions of the Constitutional Reform Act 2005. Morritt retired as Chancellor of the High Court on 10 January 2013.

Morritt was Treasurer of Lincoln's Inn in 2005. His family owns Rokeby Park in County Durham.

== Arms ==
Coat of arms of Andrew Morritt

Notes
Displayed on a painted panel at Lincoln's Inn.
Motto
Ubi Libertas Ibi Patria
