= President of the Business and Property Division =

Position in the High Court of Justice of England and Wales

President of The Business and Property Division
- High Court of Justice
- Incumbent; Vacant since 1 November 2026
- High Court of Justice; Judiciary of England and Wales
- Style: The Right Honourable
- Seat: Royal Courts of Justice
- Nominator: Judicial Appointments Commission
- Appointer: Monarch of the United Kingdom, on the recommendation of the Prime Minister and Lord Chancellor
- Formation: 10 April 1813
- Website: www.judiciary.uk/about-the-judiciary/who-are-the-judiciary/judges/profile-chancellor-hc/

The President of the Business and Property Division, known until 2005 as the Vice-Chancellor of the High Court, and between 2005 and 2026 as Chancellor of the High Court is the head of the Business and Property Division of the High Court of Justice of England and Wales. This judge and the other two heads of divisions (Family and King's Bench) sit by virtue of their offices often, as and when their expertise is deemed relevant, in a panel in the Court of Appeal (England and Wales). As such this judge ranks equally to the President of the Family Division and the President of the King's Bench Division.

From 1813 to 1841, the solitary and from 1841 to 1875, the three ordinary judges of the Court of Chancery – rarely a court of first instance until 1855 – were called vice-chancellors. The more senior judges of the same court were the Lord Chancellor and the Master of the Rolls (who were moved fully to the Court of Appeal above in 1881). Each would occasionally hear cases alone or make declarations on paper applications alone. Partly due to the old system of many pre-pleadings, pleadings, and hearings before most cases would reach Chancery the expense and duration of proceedings was pilloried in art and literature before the reforms of the late 19th century. Charles Dickens set Bleak House around raised hopes in a near-incomprehensible, decades-long case in Chancery (Jarndyce and Jarndyce), involving a decision on an increasingly old will which was rendered useless as all of the deceased's wealth was – unknowingly to the prospective beneficiaries – absorbed in legal costs. Reform swiftly followed.

Certain acts of Parliament between the 1870s and 1899 (the Judicature Acts) merged the courts of law and those of equity, bringing an end to the position of vice-chancellor in 1875. In 1971, the title of Vice-Chancellor was revived for the president of the Chancery Division of the High Court of Justice. In 2005, the judicial functions of the Lord Chancellor were abolished and the position of Vice-Chancellor was renamed Chancellor of the High Court. In 2026, the Chancery Division was renamed to the Business and Property Division

== Ireland ==
An equivalent position existed in Ireland between 1867 and 1904 (Vice-Chancellor of Ireland) when the office was abolished. Throughout that period it was held by Hedges Eyre Chatterton (who was born in Cork and died in 1910 aged 91).

== Vice-chancellors, 1813–1875 ==
Because of an increase in caseload in the Court of Chancery for its two judges (the Lord Chancellor and the Master of the Rolls), an additional judicial office, the Vice-Chancellor of England, was created by the Administration of Justice Act 1813 to share the work. With the transfer of the equity jurisdiction to the Court of Chancery from the Court of Exchequer, two vice-chancellors were added in 1841 by the Chancery Act 1841, with the caveat that no successor for the second of the two new judges (James Wigram) could be appointed. Lancelot Shadwell (the Vice-Chancellor of England at the time the bill came into effect) died in office in 1850 and the three vice-chancellors became of equal status, with the "of England" dropped. In 1851, Parliament relented so a successor to Wigram could be named to keep the number at three (George Turner), but again with the caveat (that proved temporary) that no future successor could be appointed. The caveat was lifted by section 52 of the Master in Chancery Abolition Act 1852, so the number became fixed at three until the next major court reforms.

After the Judicature Acts, which merged the Court of Chancery and various other courts into the new High Court of Justice, came into force, new vice-chancellors were not appointed: new judges of the Chancery Division became styled "Mr. Justice ..." like other High Court judges (adopting the style of the pre-merger common law courts).

- 10 April 1813: Sir Thomas Plumer
- 17 January 1818: Sir John Leach
- 2 May 1827: Sir Anthony Hart
- 31 October 1827: Sir Lancelot Shadwell
- 28 October 1841 – 1851: Sir James Lewis Knight-Bruce
- 28 October 1841 – 1850: Sir James Wigram
- 2 November 1850 – 1851: Sir Robert Monsey Rolfe (The Lord Cranworth from 12 December 1850)
- 2 April 1851 – 1853: Sir George Turner
- 20 October 1851 – 1866: Sir Richard Torin Kindersley
- 20 October 1851 – 1852: Sir James Parker
- 20 September 1852 – 1871: Sir John Stuart
- 10 January 1853 – 1868: Sir William Wood
- 1 December 1866 – 1881: Sir Richard Malins
- 13 March 1868 – 1869: Sir George Markham Giffard
- 2 January 1869 – 1870: Sir William Milbourne James
- 4 July 1870 – 1886: Sir James Bacon
- 18 April 1871 – 1873: Sir John Wickens
- 11 November 1873 – 1882: Sir Charles Hall

== Vice-chancellors, 1971–2005 ==
A new judicial post of Vice-Chancellor (its last holder having been that of 1882) was created by section 5 of the Administration of Justice Act 1970, which came into effect on 1 October 1971. Under its provisions the Vice-Chancellor was appointed by the Lord Chancellor (president of the Chancery Division). He became responsible to the latter for administering the division. The Senior Courts Act 1981 made the position one appointed by the Queen (like the President of the Family Division) and made the Vice-Chancellor vice-president of the Chancery Division.

- 1971: Sir John Pennycuick
- 1974: Sir Anthony Plowman
- 1976: Sir Robert Megarry
- 3 June 1985: Sir Nicolas Browne-Wilkinson
- 1 October 1991: Sir Donald Nicholls
- 3 October 1994: Sir Richard Scott
- 17 July 2000: Sir Andrew Morritt (Chancellor of the High Court after the relevant provisions of the Constitutional Reform Act 2005 came into effect on 1 October 2005.)

== Chancellor of the High Court, 2005–2026 ==
The Constitutional Reform Act 2005 removed the Lord Chancellor's role as a judge. As one of the judicial roles of the office was president of the Chancery Division, the office of Vice-Chancellor was renamed Chancellor of the High Court and replaced the Lord Chancellor. The name change took effect on 1 October 2005, but some of the responsibilities (including the presidency of the division) did not transfer until 3 April 2006.

- 1 October 2005: Sir Andrew Morritt (Vice-Chancellor before the relevant provisions of the Constitutional Reform Act 2005 came into effect on 1 October 2005.)
- 11 January 2013: Sir Terence Etherton
- 24 October 2016: Sir Geoffrey Vos
- 3 February 2021: Sir Julian Flaux
- 1 November 2025: Sir Colin Birss

== President of the Business and Property Division, 2026–present ==
On 1 October 2026, the Chancery Division was renamed to the Business and Property Division.

- 1 October 2026: Sir Colin Birss (continued in office)

== See also ==
- Lord Chief Justice of England and Wales
- Master of the Rolls
- President of the King's Bench Division
- President of the Family Division
