= Dagenais v Canadian Broadcasting Corp =

- Supreme Court of Canada

Hearing: January 24, 1994 Judgment: December 8, 1994
- Full case name: Canadian Broadcasting Corporation and the National Film Board of Canada v. Lucien Dagenais, Léopold Monette, Joseph Dugas and Robert Radford
- Citations: [1994] 3 S.C.R. 835; 1994 CanLII 39 (S.C.C.); (1994), 120 D.L.R. (4th) 12; (1994), 94 C.C.C. (3d) 289; (1994), 25 C.R.R. (2d) 1; (1994), 34 C.R. (4th) 269; (1994), 76 O.A.C. 81
- Prior history: Judgment for the respondents in the Court of Appeal for Ontario

Court membership
- Chief Justice: Antonio Lamer; Puisne Justices: Gérard La Forest, Claire L'Heureux-Dubé, John Sopinka, Charles Gonthier, Peter Cory, Beverley McLachlin, Frank Iacobucci, John C. Major

Reasons given
- Majority: Lamer C.J., joined by Sopinka, Cory, Iacobucci and Major JJ.
- Concurrence: McLachlin J.
- Dissent: Gonthier J.
- Dissent: La Forest J.
- Dissent: L'Heureux-Dubé J.

Dagenais v Canadian Broadcasting Corp, [1994] 3 S.C.R. 835 is the leading Supreme Court of Canada decision on publication bans and their relation to the right to freedom of expression under section 2(b) of the Canadian Charter of Rights and Freedoms. It was held that judges have a common law discretionary authority to impose publication bans on information revealed in a criminal trial. The judge, however, must weigh competing rights, such as freedom of expression and right to a fair trial, to mizzen the violation of rights. It was further held that the media has a right to appeal a decision of a publication ban.

== Background ==
Four former and present members of the Christian Brothers, a Catholic order, were charged with sexual abuse of young boys while they were teachers at an Ontario Catholic school. During their trial the Canadian Broadcasting Corporation produced a dramatic mini-series, based on another sexual abuse scandal at Mount Cashel Orphanage, named The Boys of St. Vincent, and it was scheduled to be broadcast nationwide in the first week of December, 1992. The defence brought an application requesting the jury be charged before the airing of the show or else sequestered over the weekend of the show's airing. The judge declined and instead merely directed the jury to avoid watching the show.

The day before the airing the defence applied for an injunction to restrain the CBC from broadcasting the show and from publishing any information relating to the show until the last of the four trials were over. The injunction was granted.

On appeal, the Court of Appeal for Ontario upheld the injunction but limited it only to Ontario and Montreal, and overturned the ban on any publicity of the show. The CBC and the National Film Board of Canada appealed the decision to the Supreme Court of Canada.

== Opinion of the Court ==
The majority of the Court held that the publication ban was in violation of the freedom of expression under section 2(b) of the Charter.

== Aftermath ==
The Court set out a test for a publication ban to be granted, and this has since become known as the Dagenais/Mentuck test:

Smith J stated in a 2014 judgment that:

The Supreme Court of Canada has closely guarded the open court concept over the years and in the last 20 years has narrowed the test for the use of discretionary orders to ban the publication of evidence in Dagenais v. Canadian Broadcasting Corp, and R v Mentuck, known as the "Dagenais-Mentuck" test. The "Dagenais-Mentuck" test requires the party opposing media access to demonstrate that the order (for the ban) is necessary to prevent a serious risk to the proper administration of justice and that the salutary effects of the order sought outweigh the deleterious effects on the rights and interests of the parties and public.

== See also ==
- List of Supreme Court of Canada cases (Lamer Court)
