= John Wickens =

English barrister and judge

Sir John Wickens (13 June 1815 – 25 October 1873) was an English barrister and judge.

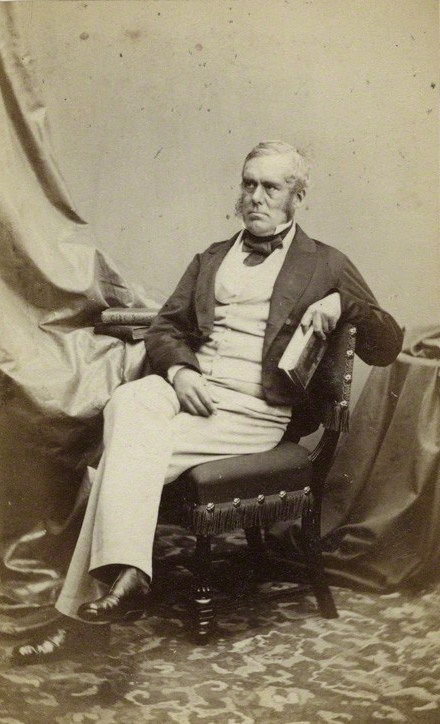
John Wickens, 1860s photograph

== Life ==
The second son of James Stephen Wickens of Chandos Street, Cavendish Square, London by his wife, Anne Goodenough, daughter of John Hayter of Winterbourne Stoke, Wiltshire, was born at his father's house on 13 June 1815. He was educated at Eton College under John Keate.

Wickens won in 1832 an open scholarship at Balliol College, Oxford, matriculating on 30 November. He graduated B.A. with a double first in Michaelmas term 1836, and M.A. in 1839, but was an unsuccessful candidate for a Balliol fellowship (a later rumour put this down to ill-timed display of his wit). Having entered Lincoln's Inn, he was called to the bar in May 1840.

A conveyancer and equity draftsman, Wickens had a practice that reaped the benefit when in 1852 a number of leading juniors took silk. He appeared frequently before the House of Lords and the privy council. During the later years of his career as barrister he was equity counsel to the treasury; he was never Q.C. nor a parliamentary candidate. Horace Davey was one of his pupils in the late 1850s, when his chambers had a high reputation on the equity side.

In 1868 Wickens was made vice-chancellor of the county palatine of Lancaster on the elevation of Sir William Milbourne James as Lord Justice of Appeal. In 1871 he was elected a bencher of his inn, and in April of that year was raised to the bench as Vice-Chancellor of England in succession to Sir John Stuart, and was knighted. As a judge he was considered to stay rather close to the case law.

Wickens's health broke down within a short period of his appointment, and he died at his seat, Chilgrove, near Chichester, on 23 October 1873.

== Family ==
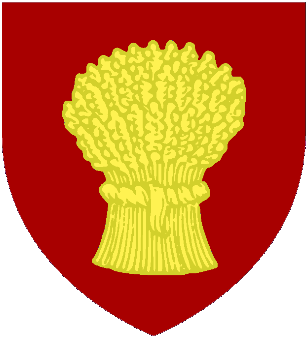
Shield of arms as displayed at Lincoln's Inn.

Wickens married, in 1845, Harriet Frances, daughter of William Davey of Cowley House, Gloucestershire. His daughter, Mary Erskine, married Mr. Justice George Farwell.

== Notes ==
Attribution

This article incorporates text from a publication now in the public domain: Lee, Sidney, ed. (1900). "Wickens, John". Dictionary of National Biography. Vol. 61. London: Smith, Elder & Co.
