= R v Mentuck =

- Supreme Court of Canada

Hearing: June 18, 2001 Judgment: November 15, 2001
- Citations: 2001 SCC 76, [2001] 3 SCR 442
- Docket No.: 27738

Court membership
- Chief Justice: Beverley McLachlin; Puisne Justices: Claire L'Heureux-Dubé, Charles Gonthier, Frank Iacobucci, John C. Major, Michel Bastarache, Ian Binnie, Louise Arbour, Louis LeBel

Reasons given
- Unanimous reasons by: The Court

R v Mentuck is a 2001 criminal case in Canada which led to changes in undercover police procedure and how to interrogate suspects.

== Overview ==
Clayton Mentuck, a native lad, was accused of killing a 14 year old teenager, Amanda Cook, in 1996. His first murder trial ended with a stay of proceedings in April 1998 after the trial judge ruled that certain statements, because police had violated his Charter rights, could not be heard by the jury. In April 1998 lawyers revealed that a tape of Mr. Mentuck's police interrogation had been doctored, causing Mr Justice John A. Menzies of the Court of Queen's Bench of Manitoba to issue the stay.

The conduct of the RCMP was questioned by the defence in the second trial because of the procedure that was employed to obtain Mentuck's confession, now known as Mr. Big (police procedure). After the first trial had ended in a hung jury, Mentuck denied the murder was his at least a dozen times to an undercover officer (aka "Mr Big") but he finally caved and confessed, after significant verbal pressure and financial subsidy from Mr Big. The judge ruled that the confession be excluded because the level of inducement diminished the reliability of the testimony.

Because the jury could not convict him in his second trial, the judge declared a mistrial. A third trial was scheduled a few months later.

For the third trial, Mentuck elected to be tried by judge alone. He was exonerated and wished for his ordeal, and in particular the tactics used in his case by the RCMP to elicit a confession, to be known by the public at large but was prevented by a publication ban. Mentuck appealed the ban to the Supreme Court of Canada. Unlike most cases this case did not come up through an appeal court. Contemporary law prevents intermediate courts from judging publication bans, making the only avenue for such challenges the Supreme Court. Mr. Justice Alan MacInnes called the technique "bizarre". Said Jonathan Kroft, a lawyer fighting the ban on behalf of The Winnipeg Free Press and Thomson Newspapers Ltd:

There is a huge public interest in knowing how government operates vis-à-vis the citizen, If this ban becomes permanent, it will be a permanent impediment from knowing how the police operate.

Justice Iacobucci wrote for a unanimous Supreme Court a judgment that supported

1. a publication ban for one year but no more as to the identity of police officers who arrested Mentuck, and
2. refusing a ban as to operational methods.

That is, the operational methods were forthwith subject to disclosure. The ban ordered by the trial judge was properly issued and was of the appropriate scope in light of the requirements of the Charter. A three-pronged analysis introduced here by the court required the consideration of the necessity of the ban in relation to its object of protecting the proper administration of justice.

The appeal was from a judgment of the Court of Queen's Bench of Manitoba. The particular trial dealt with a second-degree murder suspect. The suspect was subject to three trials, at the end of which he was acquitted. In the interval, Mentuck spent 20 months in jail. This case is important because it shows that the revelation of the operational methods of police is no bar to publication. A protocol has arisen in Canadian law to determine whether a publication ban can be justified; this protocol is now known as the Dagenais/Mentuck test.

The Mentuck case has become infamous, as the Mr Big procedure has become viewed by the courts as "ingenious, not insidious". One author, writing in 2007, even says that the technique is "indiscriminate and pernicious". A newspaper has taken to publish at intervals the story of Mentuck due to its importance.

Nearly twenty years later, it was revealed that Mentuck had written a note to Cook's mother in which he confessed the crime, but the note was deemed unreliable and inadmissible in court. It was not stated under what conditions the note had been written.

== See also ==
- Dagenais v Canadian Broadcasting Corp
- R (Canada) v Adams
