= Rocket artillery =

Class of rockets used as artillery

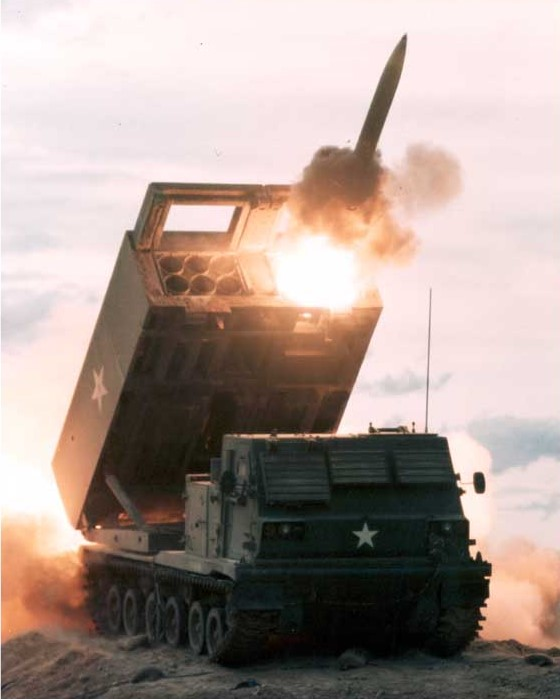
M270 MLRS

Rocket artillery is artillery that uses rockets as the projectile. The use of rocket artillery dates back to medieval China where devices such as fire arrows were used (albeit mostly as a psychological weapon). Fire arrows were also used in multiple launch systems and transported via carts. In the late nineteenth century, due to improvements in the power and range of conventional artillery, the use of early military rockets declined; they were finally used on a small scale by both sides during the American Civil War. Modern rocket artillery was first employed during World War II, in the form of the German Nebelwerfer family of rocket ordnance designs, Soviet Katyusha-series and numerous other systems employed on a smaller scale by the Western allies and Japan. In modern use, the rockets are often guided by an internal guiding system or GPS in order to maintain accuracy.

== History ==
=== Early history ===
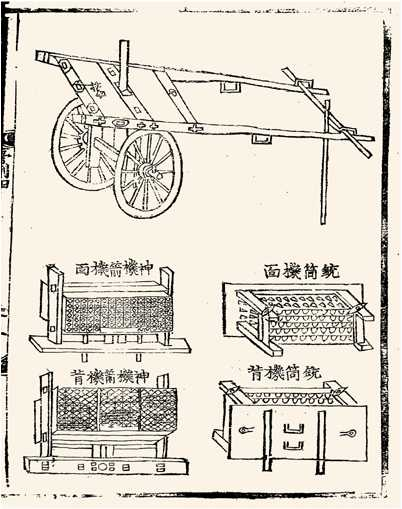
Illustration of a Korean rocket launcher of the 1500s

The use of rockets as some form of artillery dates back to medieval China where devices such as fire arrows were used (albeit mostly as a psychological weapon). Fire arrows were also used in multiple launch systems and transported via carts. Devices such as the Korean hwacha were able to fire hundreds of fire arrows simultaneously. The use of medieval rocket artillery was picked up by the invading Mongols and spread to the Ottoman Turks who in turn used them on the European battlefield.

The use of war-rockets is well documented in medieval Europe. In 1408 Duke John the Fearless of Burgundy used 300 incendiary rockets in the Battle of Othée. The city dwellers coped with this tactic by covering their roofs with dirt.

=== Metal-cylinder rocket artillery ===
In the Mughal Empire under Akbar's reign during the 16th century, Mughal artillery rockets began to use metal casing, which made them more weatherproof and allowed a larger amount of gunpowder, increasing their destructive power. Mughal ban iron rockets were described by European visitors, including François Bernier who witnessed the 1658 Battle of Samugarh fought between brothers Aurangzeb and Dara Shikoh.

The earliest successful utilization of metal-cylinder rocket artillery is associated with the Kingdom of Mysore, South India. Tipu Sultan successfully established the powerful Sultanate of Mysore and introduced the first iron-cased metal-cylinder rocket. The Mysorean rockets of this period were innovative, chiefly because of the use of iron tubes that tightly packed the gunpowder propellant; this enabled higher thrust and longer range for the missile (up to 2 km range).

Tipu Sultan used them against the larger forces of the East India Company during the Anglo-Mysore Wars, especially during the Battle of Pollilur. Another battle where these missiles were deployed was the Battle of Sultanpet Tope, where Colonel Arthur Wellesley, later famous as the First Duke of Wellington, was almost defeated by Tipu's Diwan Purnaiah.

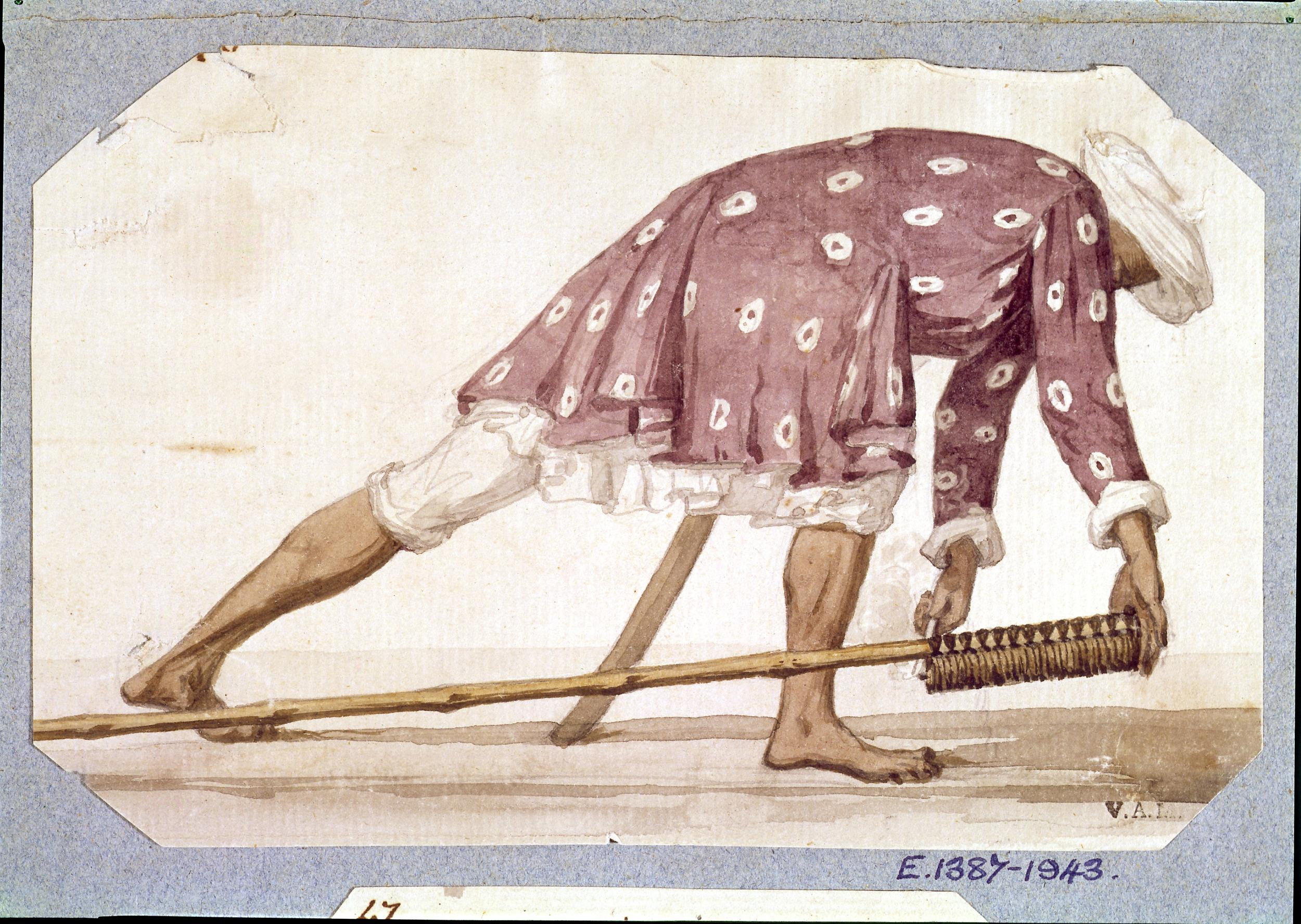
Rocket being lighted by Mysorean soldier (Illustration by Robert Home)

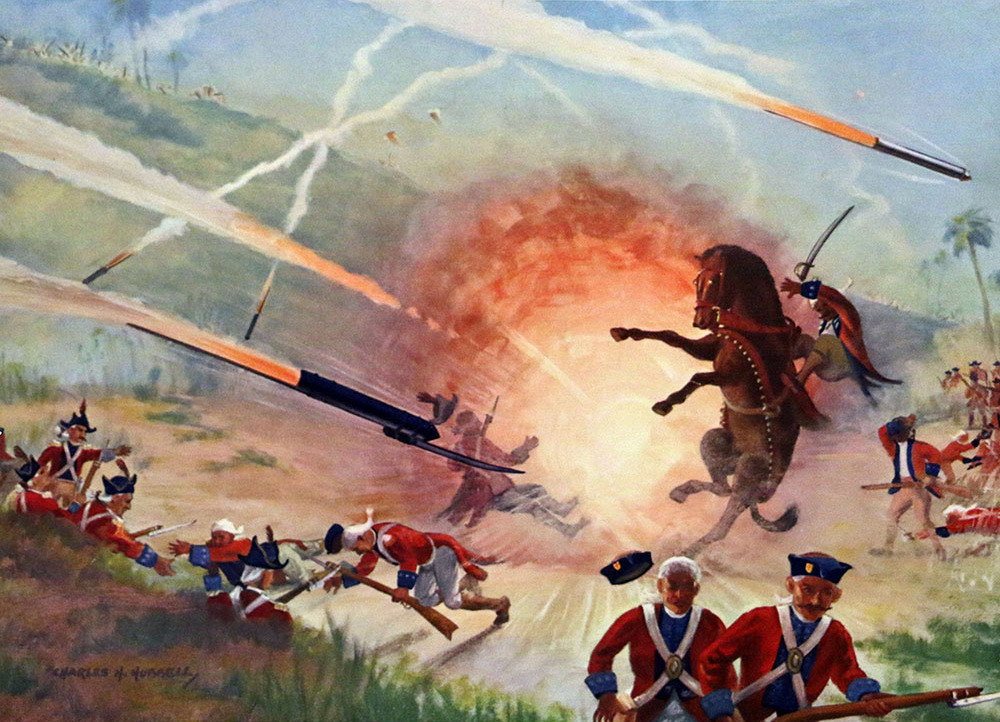
A painting showing the British forces confronted with Mysorean rockets

The rockets had a demoralizing effect on the enemy due to the noise and bursting light. The rockets could be of various sizes but usually consisted of a tube of soft hammered iron about 8 inches (20 cm) long and 1.5 to 3 inches (3.8 to 7.6 cm) in diameter, closed at one end and strapped to a shaft of bamboo about 4 ft (1 m) long. The iron tube acted as a combustion chamber and contained well-packed black powder propellant. A rocket carrying about one pound (~500 gm) of powder could travel almost 1,000 yards (~900 m).

According to Stephen Oliver Fought and John F. Guilmartin, Jr. in Encyclopædia Britannica (2008):

Hyder Ali, prince of Mysore, developed war rockets with an important change: the use of metal cylinders to contain the combustion powder. Although the hammered soft iron he used was crude, the bursting strength of the container of black powder was much higher than the earlier paper construction. Thus a greater internal pressure was possible, with a resultant greater thrust of the propulsive jet. The rocket body was lashed with leather thongs to a long bamboo stick. The range was perhaps up to three-quarters of a mile (more than a kilometre). Although individually these rockets were not accurate, dispersion error became less important when large numbers were fired rapidly in mass attacks. They were particularly effective against cavalry and were hurled into the air, after lighting, or skimmed along the hard dry ground. Hyder Ali's son, Tipu Sultan, continued to develop and expand the use of rocket weapons, reportedly increasing the number of rocket troops from 1,200 to a corps of 5,000. In battles at Seringapatam in 1792 and 1799 these rockets were used with minimal effect against the British.

=== Congreve rockets ===
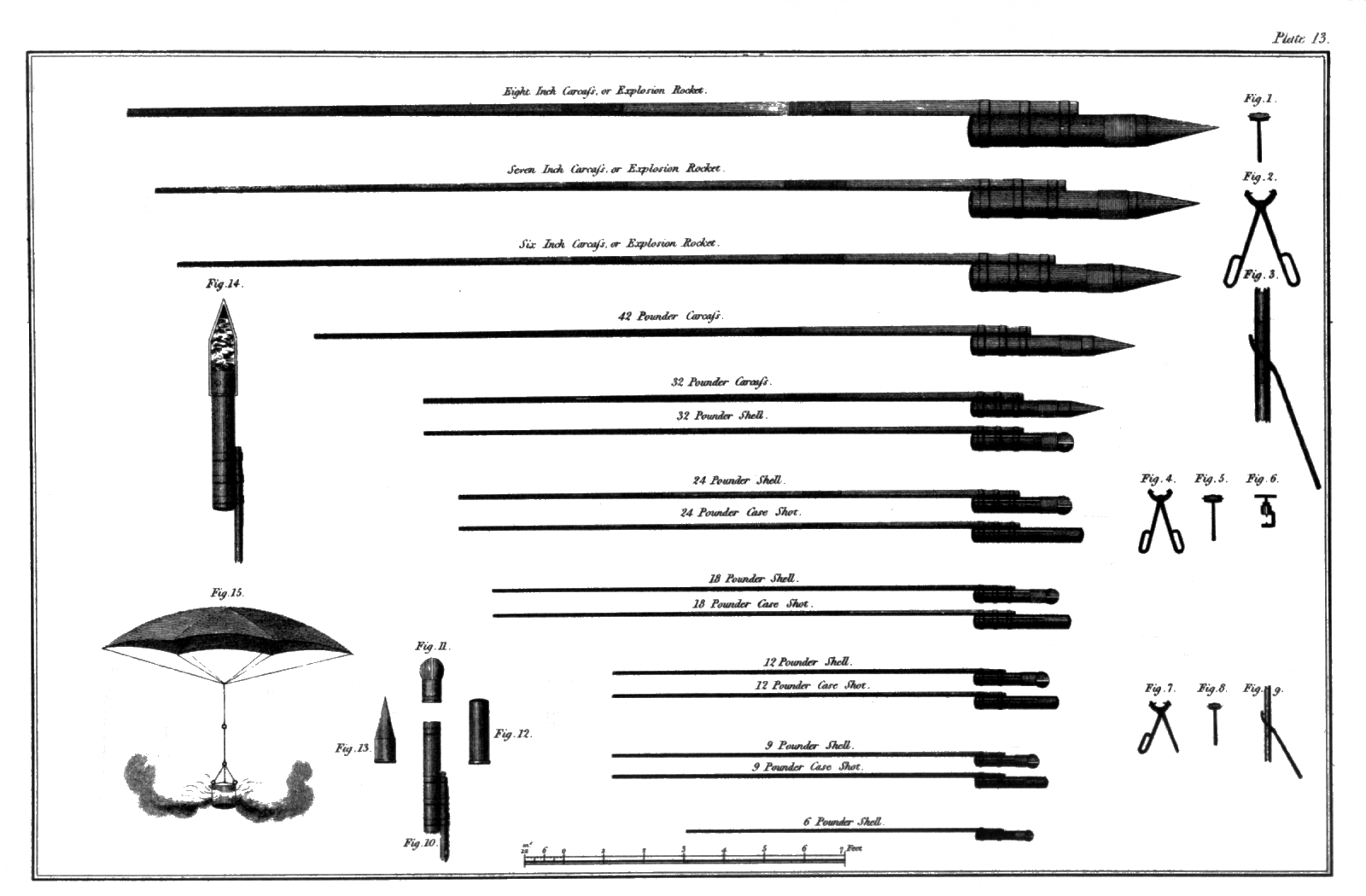
Congreve rockets from Congreve's original work; these weapons were successively employed during the Napoleonic Wars and the War of 1812.

The Indian Tipu Sultan's rocket experiences, including Munro's book of 1789, eventually led to the Royal Arsenal beginning a military rocket R&D program in 1801. Several rocket cases were collected from Mysore and sent to Britain for analysis. The development was chiefly the work of Col. (later Sir) William Congreve, son of the Comptroller of the Royal Arsenal, Woolwich, London, who set on a vigorous research and development programme at the Arsenal's laboratory; after development work was complete, the rockets were manufactured in quantity further north, near Waltham Abbey, Essex. He was told that "the British at Seringapatam had suffered more from the rockets than from the shells or any other weapon used by the enemy". "In at least one instance", an eyewitness told Congreve, "a single rocket had killed three men and badly wounded others".

It has been suggested that Congreve may have adapted iron-cased gunpowder rockets for use by the British military from prototypes created by the Irish nationalist Robert Emmet during Emmet's Rebellion in 1803. But this seems far less likely given the fact that the British had been exposed to Indian rockets since 1780 at the latest, and that a vast quantity of unused rockets and their construction equipment fell into British hands at the end of the Anglo-Mysore Wars in 1799, at least 4 years before Emmet's rockets.

Congreve introduced a standardised formula for the making of gunpowder at Woolwich and introduced mechanical grinding mills to produce powder of uniform size and consistency. Machines were also employed to ensure the packing of the powder was perfectly uniform. His rockets were more elongated, had a much larger payload, and were mounted on sticks; this allowed them to be launched from the sea at a greater range. He also introduced shot into the payload, which added shrapnel damage to the incendiary capability of the rocket. By 1805 he was able to introduce a comprehensive weapons system to the British Army.

The rocket had a "cylindro-conoidal" warhead and was launched in pairs from half troughs on simple metal A-frames. The original rocket design had the guide pole side-mounted on the warhead, this was improved in 1815 with a base plate with a threaded hole. They could be fired up to two miles, the range being set by the degree of elevation of the launching frame, although at any range they were fairly inaccurate and had a tendency for premature explosion. They were as much a psychological weapon as a physical one, and they were rarely or never used except alongside other types of artillery. Congreve designed several different warhead sizes from 3 to 24 pounds (1.4 to 10.9 kg). The 24 pounds (11 kg) type with a 15 foot (4.6 m) guide pole was the most widely used variant. Different warheads were used, including explosive, shrapnel and incendiary. They were manufactured at a special facility near the Waltham Abbey Royal Gunpowder Mills beside the River Lea in Essex.

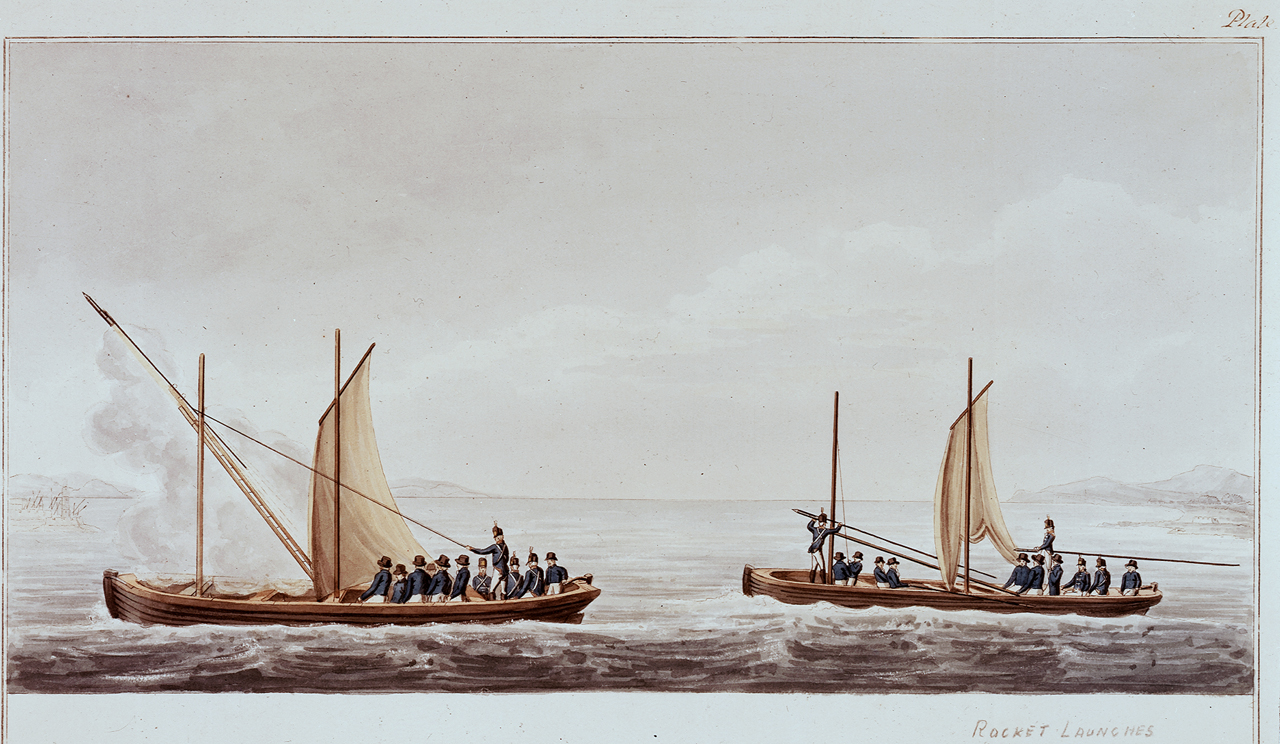
"Use of rockets from boats" - An illustration from William Congreve's book.

These rockets were used during the Napoleonic Wars against the city of Boulogne, and during the naval bombardment of Copenhagen, where over 25,000 rockets were launched, causing severe incendiary damage to the city. The rockets were also adapted for the purpose of flares for signalling and battlefield illumination. Henry Trengrouse utilized the rocket in his life-saving apparatus, in which the rocket was launched at a shipwreck with an attached line to help rescue the victims.

The Congreve rockets are also famous for inspiring the lawyer Francis Scott Key to pen the words the "rockets' red glare" in what became the US National Anthem during the War of 1812.

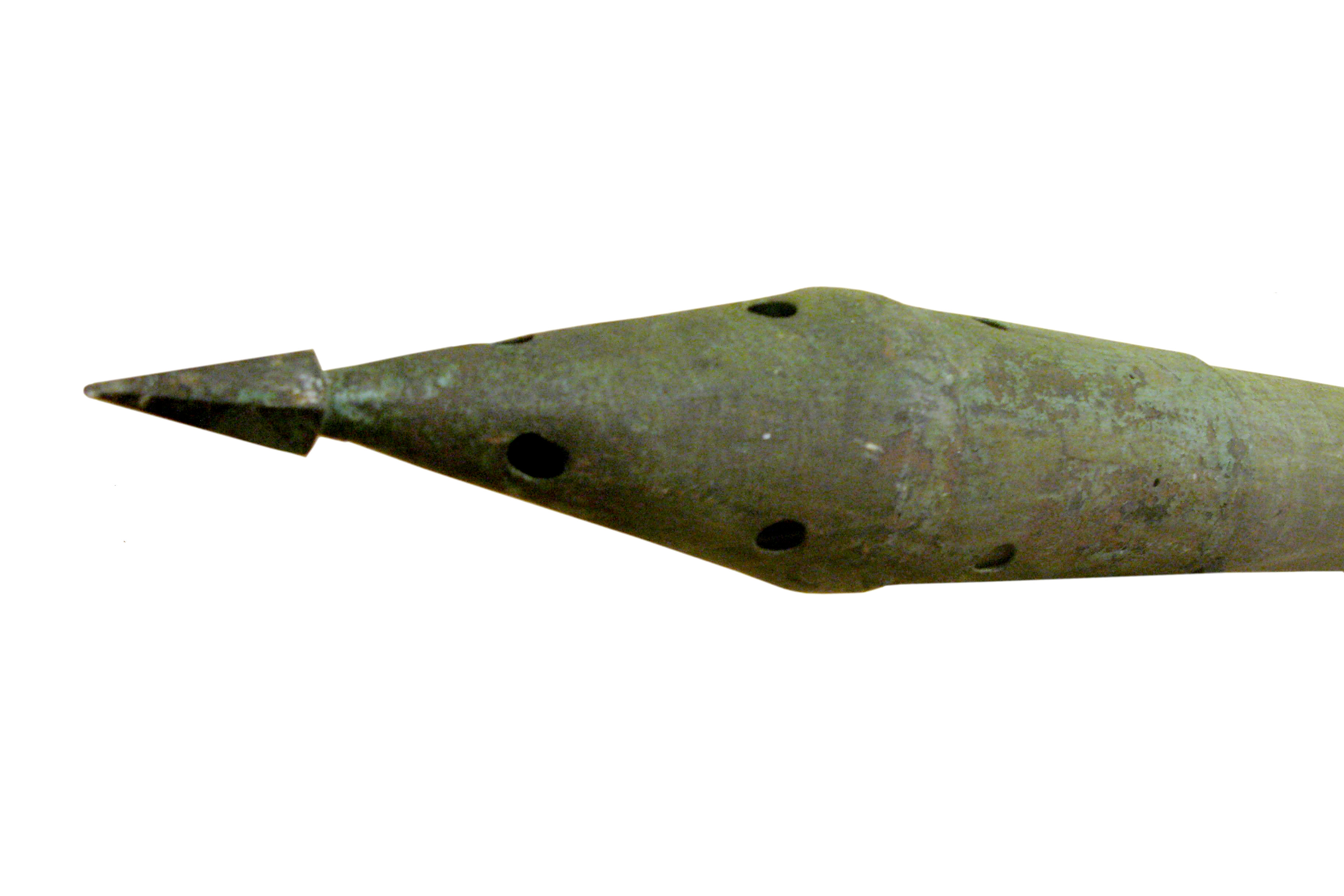
Tip of a Congreve rocket, on display at Paris naval museum

After the rockets were successfully used during Napoleon's defeat at the Battle of Waterloo, various countries were quick to adopt the weapon and establish special rocket brigades. The British created the British Army Rocket Brigade in 1818, followed by the Austrian Army and the Russian Army.

One persistent problem with the rockets was their lack of aerodynamic stability. The British engineer William Hale designed a rocket with a combination of tail fins and directed nozzles for the exhaust. This imparted a spin to the rocket during flight, which stabilized its trajectory and greatly improved its accuracy, although it did sacrifice somewhat of the maximum range. Hale rockets were enthusiastically adopted by the United States, and during the Mexican War in 1846 a volunteer brigade of rocketeers was pivotal in the surrender of Mexican forces at the Siege of Veracruz.

By the late nineteenth century, due to improvements in the power and range of conventional artillery, the use of military rockets declined; they were finally used on a small scale by both sides during the American Civil War.

=== World War II ===
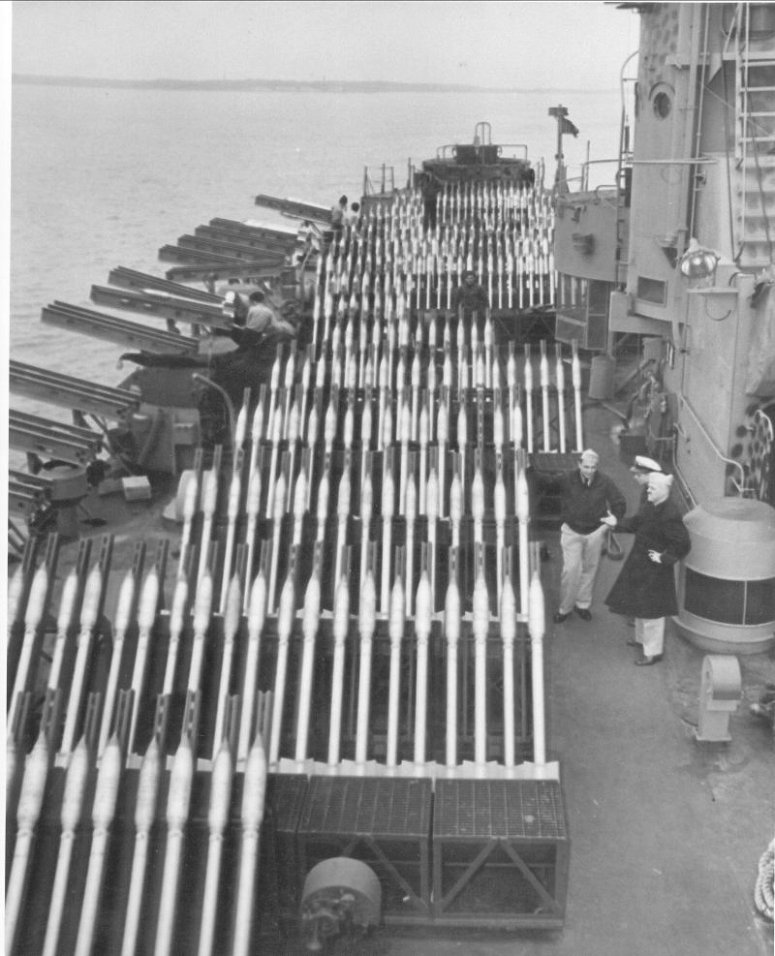
Rocket artillery on the US Navy LSM(R)-188 warship of World War II

Modern rocket artillery was first employed during World War II, in the form of the German Nebelwerfer family of rocket ordnance designs, and Soviet Katyusha-series. The Soviet Katyushas, nicknamed by German troops Stalin's Organ because of their visual resemblance to a church musical organ and alluding to the sound of the weapon's rockets, were mounted on trucks or light tanks, while the early German Nebelwerfer ordnance pieces were mounted on a small wheeled carriage which was light enough to be moved by several men and could easily be deployed nearly anywhere, while also being towed by most vehicles. The Germans also had self-propelled rocket artillery in the form of the Panzerwerfer and Wurfrahmen 40 which equipped half-track armoured fighting vehicles. An oddity in the subject of rocket artillery during this time was the German "Sturmtiger", a vehicle based on the Tiger I heavy tank chassis that was armed with a 380 mm rocket mortar.

The Western Allies of World War II employed little rocket artillery. During later periods of the war, British and Canadian troops used the Land Mattress, a towed rocket launcher. The United States Army built and deployed a small number of turret-mounted T34 Calliope and T40 Whizbang rocket artillery tanks (converted from M4 Sherman medium tanks) in France and Italy. In 1945, the British Army also fitted some M4 Shermans with two 60 lb RP3 rockets, the same as used on ground attack aircraft and known as "Tulip".

In the Pacific, however, the US Navy made heavy use of rocket artillery on their LSM(R) transports, adding to the already intense bombardment by the guns of heavy warships to soften up Japanese-held islands before the US Marines would land. On Iwo Jima, the Marines made use of rocket artillery trucks in a similar fashion as the Soviet Katyusha, but on a smaller scale.

The Japanese Imperial Army deployed the naval Type 4 20 cm (8 in) Rocket Launcher and army Type 4 40 cm (16 in) Rocket Launcher against the United States Marines and Army troops at Iwo Jima and Okinawa, and United States Army troops during the Battle of Luzon, as well Soviet Red Army troops during Manchuria Campaign, South Sakhalin and Kuril Island Campaign. Their deployment was limited relative to other mortar types and the projectiles on the 40 cm launcher were so large and heavy that they had to be loaded using small hand-operated cranes, but they were extremely accurate and had a pronounced psychological effect on opposing troops, who called them "Screaming Mimis", a nickname originally applied to the German Nebelwerfer tube-launched rocket mortar series in the European Theater of Operations. They were often used at night to conceal their launching sites and increase their disruptiveness and psychological effectiveness. The Japanese 20 cm rockets were launched from tubes or launching troughs, while the larger rockets were launched from steel ramps reinforced with wooden monopods.

The Japanese also deployed a limited number of 447mm rocket launchers, termed 45 cm Rocket Mortars by United States personnel who test-fired them at the close of the war. Their projectiles consisted of a 1,500 lb cylinder filled with propellant and ballistite sticks detonated by black powder, which produced a blast crater approximately the size of an American 1,000 lb bomb. In effect, this made the 447mm projectile a type of surface-to-surface barrel bomb. While these latter weapons were captured at Luzon and proved effective in subsequent testing, it is not clear that they were ever used against American troops, in contrast to the more common 20 and 40 cm types, which clearly contributed to the 37,870 American casualties sustained at Luzon.

==== Post-World War II ====
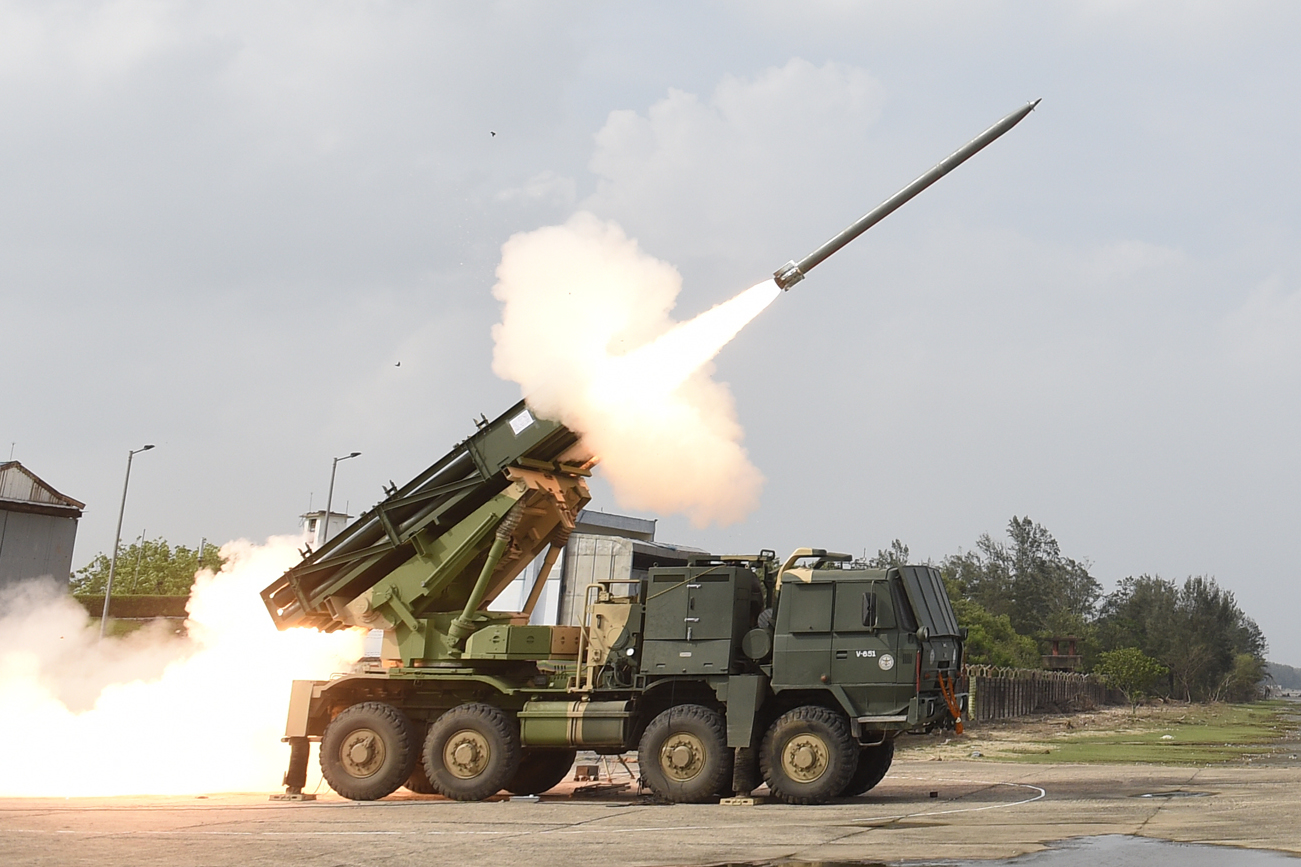
Pinaka Multi Barrel Rocket Launcher

Israel fitted some of their Sherman tanks with different rocket artillery. An unconventional Sherman conversion was the turretless Kilshon ("Trident") that launched an AGM-45 Shrike anti-radiation missile.

The Soviet Union continued its development of the Katyusha during the Cold War, and also exported them widely.

Modern rocket artillery such as the US M270 Multiple Launch Rocket System is highly mobile and are used in similar fashion to other self-propelled artillery. Global Positioning and Inertial Navigation terminal guidance systems have been introduced.

During the Kargil war of 1999, the Indian army pressed into service the Pinaka MBRL against Pakistani forces. Despite the system still being under development, it was still able to perform successfully, after which the Indian Army showed interest in inducting the system into service.

== Rocket artillery vs gun artillery ==
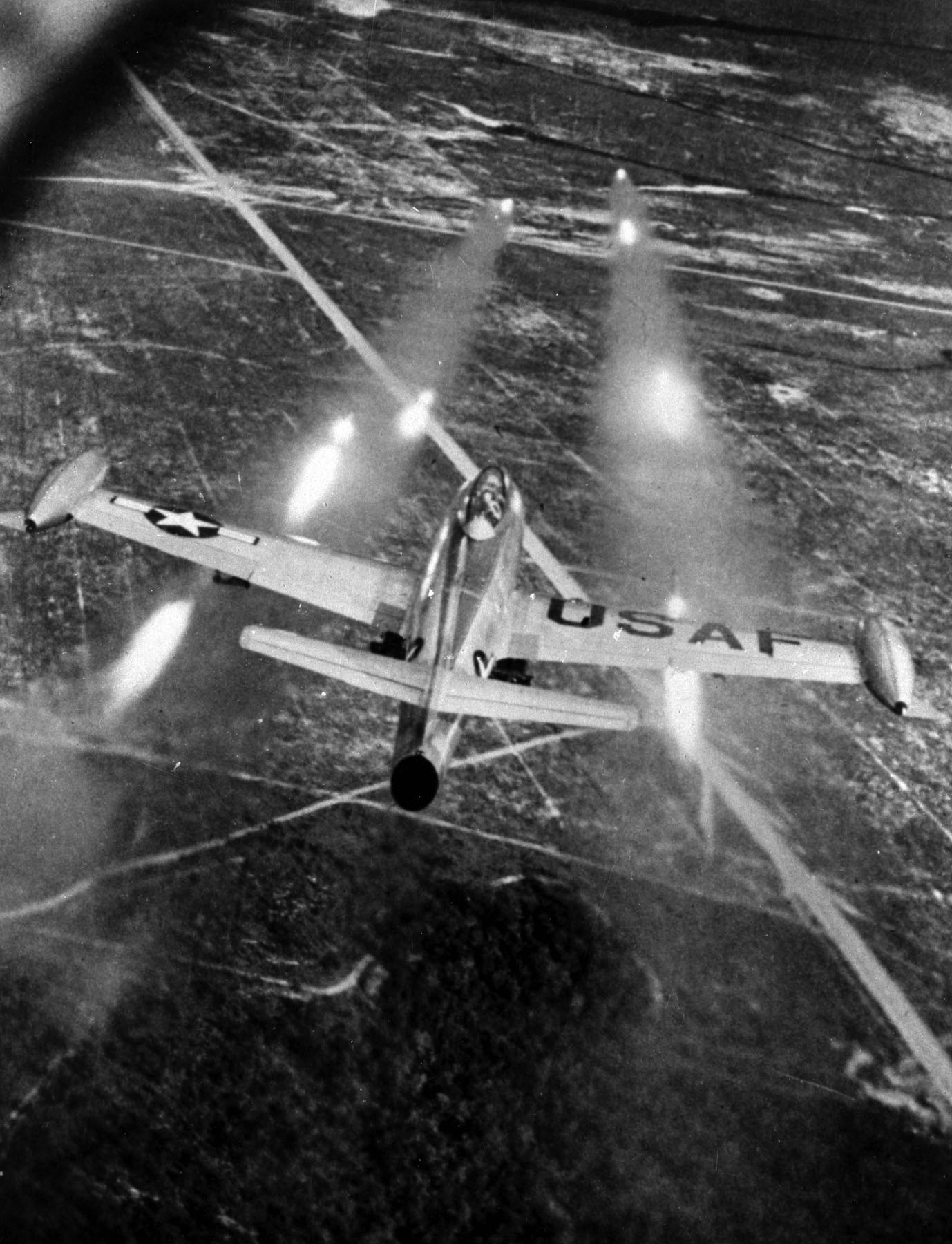
F-84E launching rockets.

- Rockets produce no or little recoil, while conventional gun artillery systems produce significant recoil. Unless firing within a very small arc with the possibility of wrecking a self-propelled artillery system's vehicle suspension, gun artillery must usually be braced against recoil. In this state they are immobile, and cannot change position easily. Rocket artillery is much more mobile and can change position easily. This "shoot-and-scoot" ability makes the platform difficult to target. A rocket artillery piece could, conceivably, fire on the move. Rocket systems produce a significant amount of backblast, however, which imposes its own restrictions. Launchers may be sighted by the firing arcs of the rockets, and their fire can damage themselves or neighbouring vehicles.
- Rocket artillery cannot usually match the accuracy and sustained rate of fire of conventional gun artillery. They may be capable of very destructive strikes by delivering a large mass of explosives simultaneously, thus increasing the shock effect and giving the target less time to take cover. Modern computer-controlled conventional artillery have recently begun to acquire the possibility to do something similar through MRSI but it is an open question if MRSI is really practical in a combat situation. On the other hand, precision-guided rocket artillery demonstrates extreme accuracy, comparable with the best guided gun artillery systems.
- Rocket artillery typically has a very large fire signature, leaving a clear smoke trail showing exactly where the barrage came from. Since the barrage does not take much time to execute, however, the rocket artillery can move away quickly.
- Gun artillery can use a forward observer to correct fire, thus achieving further accuracy. This is usually not practical with rocket artillery.
- While gun artillery shells are smaller than rockets, the gun itself must be very large to match the range of rockets. Therefore, rockets typically have longer range while the rocket launchers remain small enough to mount on mobile vehicles. Extremely large guns like the Paris Gun and the Schwerer Gustav have been rendered obsolete by long range missiles.
- Rate of fire: If the artillery barrage was intended as a preparation for an attack, and it usually is, a short but intense barrage will give the enemy less time to prepare by, for instance, dispersing or entering prepared fortifications such as trenches and bunkers.
- The higher accuracy of gun artillery means that it can be used to attack an enemy close to a friendly force. This, combined with the higher capacity for sustained fire, makes gun artillery more suitable than rocket artillery for defensive fire.
- The accuracy of gun artillery and its ability to be rapidly laid to engage targets makes it the system of choice for the engagement of moving targets and to deliver counter-battery fire.
- Many multiple rocket launcher vehicles now have the capability to fire guided rockets, eliminating the accuracy disadvantage at the cost of increased cost and decreased reliability.

== See also ==
- List of rocket artillery
- Rocket-assisted projectile
- Tactical ballistic missile
- Base bleed
