= Nebelwerfer =

German rocket artillery

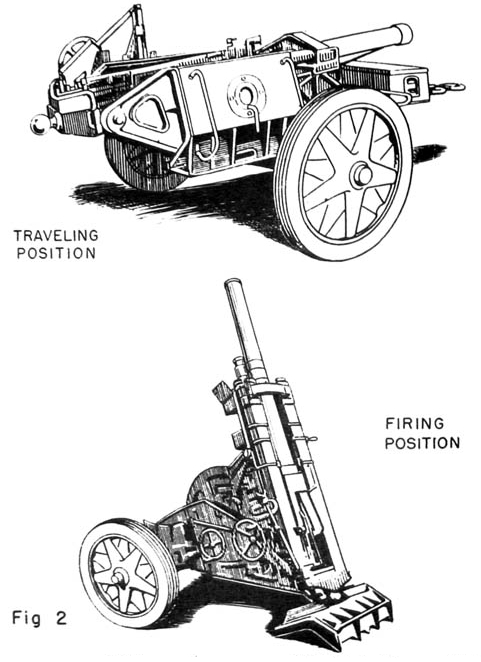
Allied intelligence diagram of a 10 cm NbW 40

The Nebelwerfer (transl. "fog launcher") was a World War II German series of weapons. They were initially developed by and assigned to the Army's Nebeltruppen. Initially, two different mortars were fielded before they were replaced by a variety of rocket launchers ranging in size from 15 to 32 centimetres (5.9 to 12.6 in). The thin walls of the rockets had the great advantage of allowing much larger quantities of gases, fluids or high explosives to be delivered than artillery or even mortar shells of the same weight. With the exception of the Balkans Campaign, Nebelwerfer were used in every campaign of the German Army during World War II. A version of the 21 cm (8.3 in) calibre system was adapted for air-to-air use against Allied bombers.

== Name ==
The Nebelwerfer's name, which translates as "fog launcher", had previously been given to a smoke-generating Nebelwerfer 35, and was later used for the 10 cm Nebelwerfer 40, which could deliver shells with chemical munitions, as well as high-explosive shells. The same name was then used for later rocket launcher systems. The name Nebelwerfer did remain in use for both systems, which was possibly not originally intended. The loud, shrill howling noise of the incoming rockets led Allied soldiers in the Sicily campaign to give it the nicknames "Screaming Mimi" and "Moaning Minnie".

Rudolf Nebel, a German aviator and rocket builder whose last name translates as "fog", is sometimes incorrectly named as the inventor of the Nebelwerfer artillery. Nebel did, however, develop a powder-based rocket system with the same name that he used as a fighter pilot during World War I, downing two British planes.

== Weapons ==
=== 10 cm Nebelwerfer 35 ===
The lower muzzle velocity of a mortar meant that its shell walls could be thinner than those of artillery shells, and it could carry a larger payload than artillery shells of the same weight. This made it an attractive delivery system for poison gases. The U.S. Army's Chemical Warfare Service developed their 4.2-inch chemical mortar for precisely that reason and the Nebeltruppen shared that reasoning. Its first weapon was also a mortar, the 10 cm Nebelwerfer 35, which was designed in 1934.

=== 10 cm Nebelwerfer 40 ===
Almost from the beginning, the army wanted more range than the 10 cm NbW 35's 3,000 metres (3,300 yd), but troop trials of two prototypes did not take place until May 1940. Neither was entirely satisfactory, but the best features of both were incorporated into the 10 cm Nebelwerfer 40. This was a very advanced breech-loading weapon with a recoil mechanism and an integral wheeled carriage. It had twice the range of its predecessor, but was eight times the weight and cost nearly ten times as much: 1,500 ℛ︁ℳ︁ vs 14,000 ℛ︁ℳ︁.

=== 15 cm Nebelwerfer 41 ===
Rocket development had begun during the 1920s and reached fruition in the late thirties. This offered the opportunity for the Nebeltruppen to deliver large quantities of poison gas or smoke simultaneously. The first weapon to be delivered to the troops was the 15 cm Nebelwerfer 41 in 1940, after the Battle of France, a purpose-designed rocket with gas, smoke and high-explosive warheads. It, like virtually all German rocket designs, was spin-stabilized to increase accuracy. One very unusual feature was that the rocket motor was in the front, the exhaust venturi being about two-thirds down the body from the nose, with the intent to optimize the blast effect of the rocket as the warhead would still be above the ground when it detonated. This proved to greatly complicate manufacture for not much extra effect and it was not copied on later rocket designs. It was fired from a six-tube launcher mounted on a towed carriage adapted from that used by the 3.7 cm PaK 36 and had a range of 6,900 metres (7,500 yd). Almost five and a half million 15 cm rockets and 6,000 launchers were manufactured over the course of the war.

=== 28/32 cm Nebelwerfer 41 ===
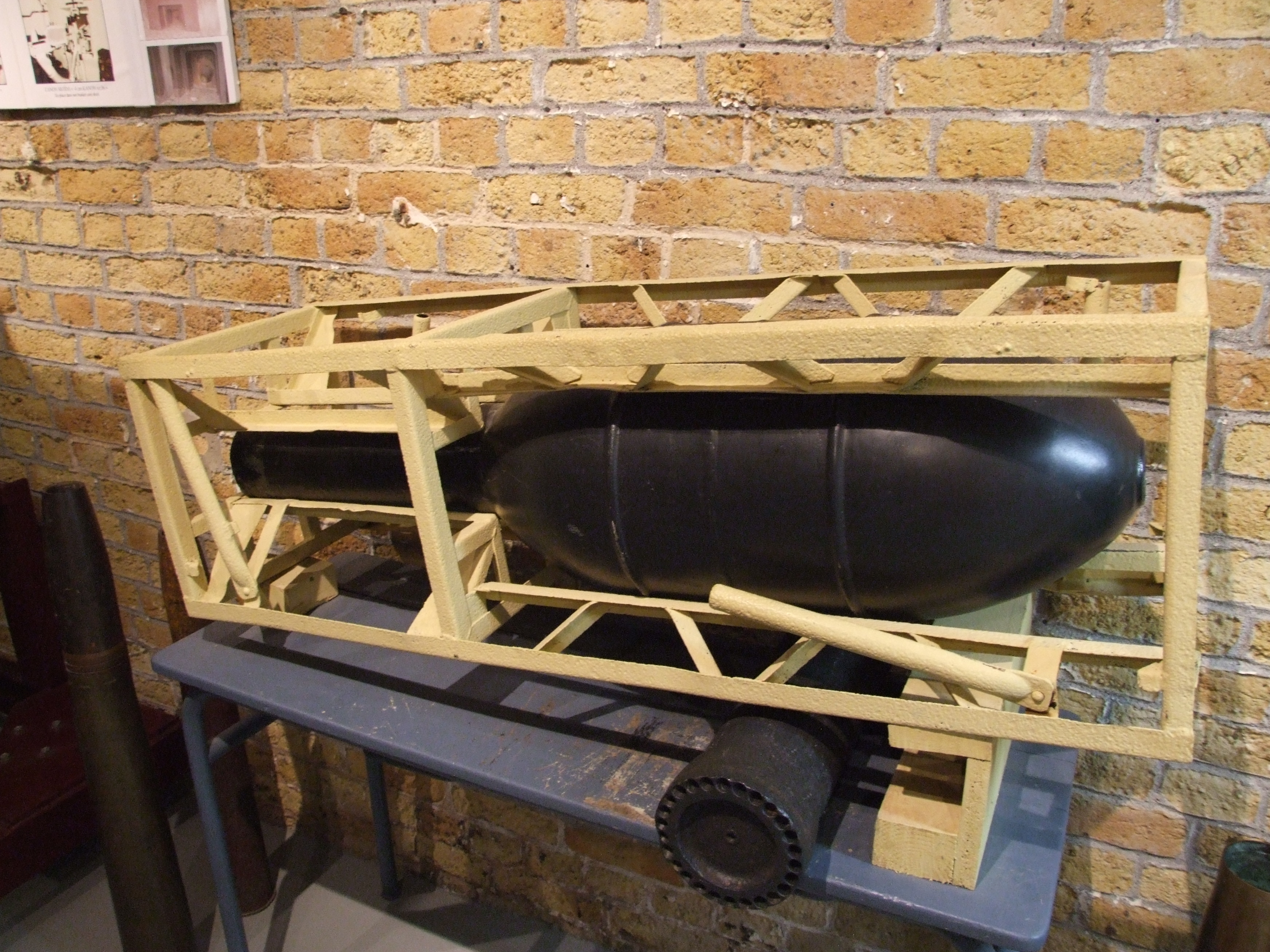
Schweres Wurfgerät 41, Mémorial du Souvenir, Dunkirk

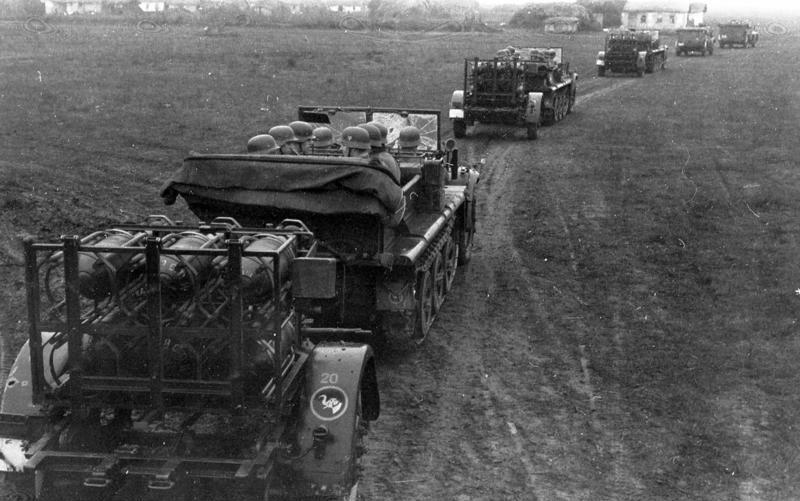
28/32 cm Nebelwerfer 41 rocket launcher

The 28/32 cm Nebelwerfer 41 rockets were introduced in 1941, before Operation Barbarossa. They used the same motor, but carried different warheads. The 28 centimetres (11 in) rocket had a HE warhead, while the 32 centimetres (13 in) rockets were incendiary. The maximum range for either rocket was only 2,200 metres (2,400 yd), a severe tactical drawback. Both could be fired from their wooden packing cases or a special wooden (schweres Wurfgerät 40 – heavy missile device) or tubular metal (schweres Wurfgerät 41 (sW.G. 41)) frame. Later, a towed launcher was developed that could take six rockets. Both rockets used the same launchers, but special liner rails had to be used for the 28 centimetres (11 in) rockets. A vehicular launch frame, the schwere Wurfrahmen 40 (sWu.R. 40), was also designed to improve the mobility of the heavy rockets. These were normally mounted on the sides of Sd.Kfz. 251 half-tracks, but they were also adapted for several different captured French tracked vehicles. The sWuR 40 was nicknamed the Stuka-zu-Fuß ("Stuka on Foot"). Over six hundred thousand rockets and 700 launchers, excluding the sW.G. and sWu.R. firing frames, were made during the war. In total, 345 launchers were built from 1941.

=== 21 cm Nebelwerfer 42 ===
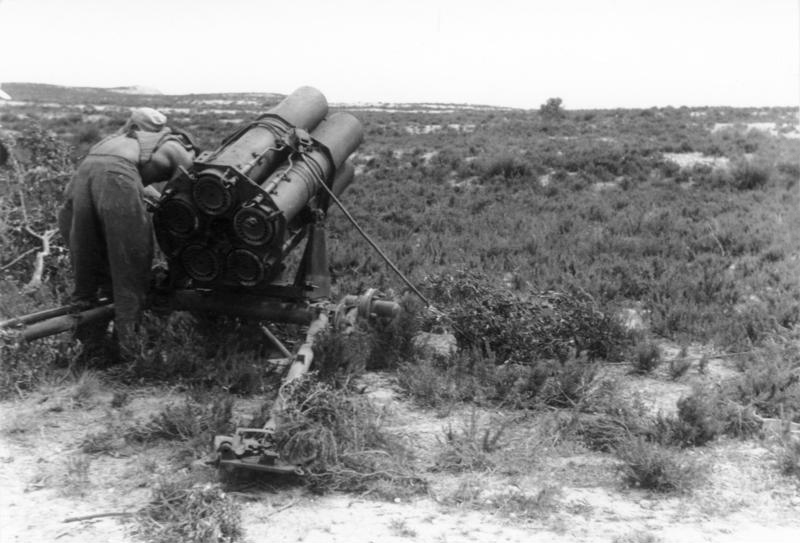
21 cm Nebelwerfer 42 launcher in North Africa

The 21 cm Nebelwerfer 42 rocket, which was introduced in 1942, had a longer range (7,850 metres (8,580 yd)) and a simpler design than the smaller 15 cm rocket. It was only made with high-explosive warheads and was fired from a five-tube launcher that used the same carriage as the smaller weapon. Liner rails were used to allow it to fire the smaller 15 cm rocket as well. It was also adapted for use by the Luftwaffe to break up Allied bomber formations in 1943 as the Werfer-Granate 21. Over four hundred thousand rockets and 1,400 launchers were completed.

=== 30 cm Nebelwerfer 42 ===
The last German-designed rocket to be introduced was the 30 cm Nebelwerfer 42 in 1943. This was intended to replace the 28 and 32 cm rockets, which had too short a range. Advances in propellant chemistry also reduced its smoke signature. It could be fired from all of the same platforms as the older rockets and many of the older launchers were converted to be used with the newer rocket by installing adapter rails, although it also had its own purpose-designed launcher, the 30 cm Raketenwerfer 56. Fewer than two hundred thousand rockets and 700 launchers were built during the war.

=== 8 cm Raketen-Vielfachwerfer ===
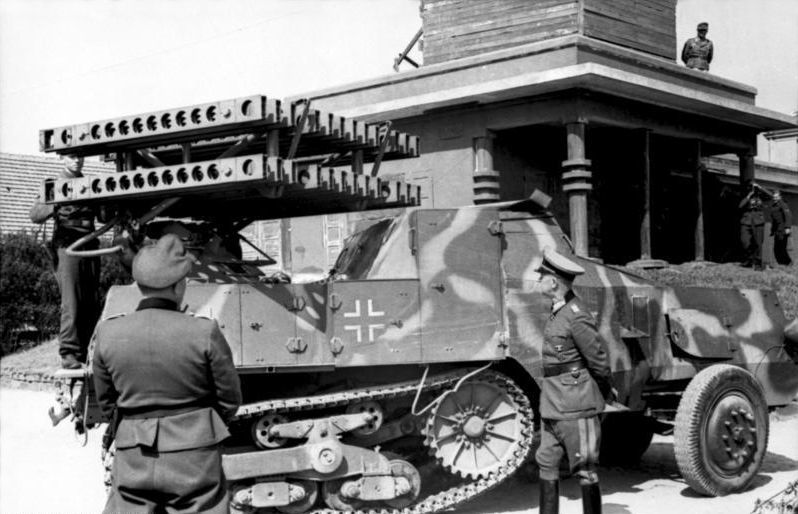
8 cm Raketen-Vielfachwerfer launcher mounted on a SOMUA MCG

The Waffen-SS decided to copy the Soviet 82-millimetre (3.2 in) M-8 Katyusha rocket launcher as the 24-rail 8 cm Raketen-Vielfachwerfer. Its fin-stabilized rockets were cheaper and easier to manufacture than the German spin-stabilized designs and used cheaper launch rails. It was also capable of using the considerable stocks of captured Soviet rockets. Separate production lines were set up under party control as the army refused to convert any of its existing factories, but not many actually appear to have been made. Production quantities are unknown, but photographic evidence shows the launcher mounted on lightly armored versions of the Sd.Kfz. 4 "Maultier" and captured French SOMUA MCG half-track.

=== Panzerwerfer ===
To improve the mobility of the Nebelwerfer units, a ten-tube 15 centimetres (5.9 in) launcher was mounted on a lightly armored Sd.Kfz. 4 "Maultier" half-track chassis as the 15 cm Panzerwerfer 42 auf Selbstfahrlafette Sd.Kfz. 4/1 (based on the Opel "Maultier", or "Mule", half-track). Three hundred of these were produced, split evenly between launchers and ammunition carriers (which were identical except for the launcher). These were superseded in production by the 15 cm Panzerwerfer 42 auf Schwerer Wehrmachtschlepper (Panzerwerfer auf SWS), which had improved cross-country mobility and had greater ammunition storage than the "Maultier". The exact number built of the latter weapon is unknown, but evidence suggests that fewer than 100 were completed before the end of the war.

=== Air-to-air adaptation (Werfer-Granate 21 rocket) ===
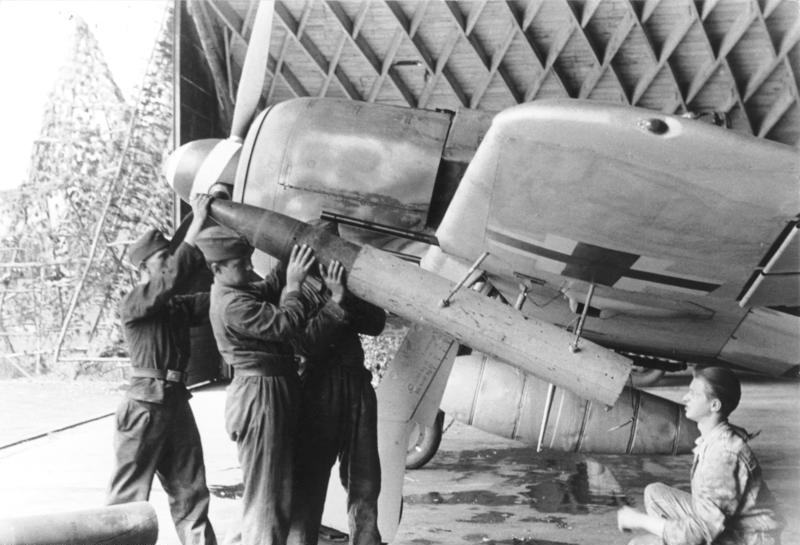
A Focke-Wulf Fw 190 being loaded with a Wfr.Gr. 21 rocket

The Werfergranate 21 (Wfr. Gr. 21), also called the 21 cm BR (BR believed to be the abbreviation for "Bordrakete" in official Luftwaffe manuals) was an unguided air-to-air rocket version of the projectile used in the Nebelwerfer 42 and was first used in the defense of Schweinfurt on 17 August 1943. The Wfr. Gr. 21 was mounted on Messerschmitt Bf 109 and Focke-Wulf Fw 190 fighters (one launch tube under each wing) and on the Messerschmitt Bf 110 and Messerschmitt Me 410 heavy fighters (two launch tubes under each wing) and was the first air-to-air rocket used by the Luftwaffe. Photographic evidence indicates that the Hungarians fitted three tubes under each wing of some of their twin-engined Me 210 Ca-1 heavy fighters. The rockets were used to break up Allied bomber combat box formations in order to enable more effective German fighter attacks against the scattered Allied aircraft. However, the high drag caused by the launchers reduced the speed and maneuverability of the launching aircraft, a handicap that could prove fatal if Allied fighters were encountered. Also, the launch tube's underwing mounting setup, which usually aimed the projectile at about 15° upwards from level flight to counter the considerable ballistic drop of the projectile in flight after launch, added to the drag problem.

One experimental fitment trial program of up to 33 of the 21 cm (8.3 in) rockets, meant to be fired from a single aircraft in an upwards direction (much like the Schräge Musik upward firing autocannon on German Nachtjäger night fighters) was proposed for the Heinkel He 177A as the Grosszerstörer, mounted in the central fuselage and flying below American combat box bomber formations to down them, but the quintet of He 177A-5 airframes set aside for the Grosszerstörer program only flew as experimental airframes, seeing no active combat deployment.

== Use in combat ==
After the crew had loaded and aimed the launcher, they had to take cover 10 to 15 metres (11 to 16 yd) away to avoid the exhaust flames, and would fire the rockets with an electric switch. After firing, however, a long streak of smoke was visible from a considerable distance, leaving the Nebelwerfer vulnerable to counter-battery fire. It was therefore necessary to relocate the launcher and crew as soon as possible after firing.

== Organization ==
Generally, mortars of the Nebeltruppen were organized into batteries of six or eight mortars, three batteries per battalion. The towed rocket launchers had six launchers per battery, three batteries per battalion. Usually, three battalions formed a regiment. Midway through the war brigades were formed, each with two regiments. A regiment was sometimes reinforced with a Panzerwerfer battery of six to eight vehicles. From 1942, their designations changed from "Nebelwerfer" to simply "Werfer".

As part of its general expansion, the Waffen-SS began to form its own Werfer units in 1943, although they never formed any unit larger than a battalion. These were organized much the same as their Army counterparts.

== Organizational history ==
The 1st, 2nd and 5th Nebelwerfer Battalions, each equipped with 24 10 cm Nbw 35 mortars in three batteries, were ready when the Germans invaded Poland in September 1939. The 1st and 2nd Battalions participated in that campaign, while the 5th remained in Western Germany. One battery of Artillery Regiment 222 was converted to 10 cm NbW 35s and participated in the Norwegian Campaign. By May 1940, five more battalions had been formed, all equipped with 10 cm NbW 35 mortars, filling out the sequence from one to eight, but only the first five were combat ready when the Battle of France began on 10 May 1940.

The first 15 cm NbW 41 rocket launchers were delivered in July 1940, forming three new regiments, the 51st, 52nd and 53rd Nebelwerfer Regiments, each with three battalions. The 54th Regiment was formed from the 1st and 7th Nebelwerfer Battalions. The Nebel-Lehr Regiment was formed from the Nebeltruppen school in Celle on 29 April 1941 with two battalions, one each with 10 cm NbW 35 mortars and 15 cm NbW 41 rockets. The independent Nebelwerfer Battalions retained their mortars with the exception of the 8th, which received rockets before Operation Barbarossa. The only way of differentiating those units equipped with mortars during this period from those with rockets being the "d." or "do." suffix added to the designations of the rocket-equipped units. Beginning in November 1941, the eight Decontamination Battalions were fully equipped with 28/32 cm NbW 41 rockets (some had sW.G. 40 and 41 launching frames earlier) and reorganized into three Heavy Werfer Regiments.

During early 1942, the 10th Mountain Werfer Battalion was formed from the 104th Decontamination Battalion and sent to 20th Mountain Army in Finland. In late 1943, Werfer-Battalion 11 was organized from two batteries already in Finland, including the battery from Artillery Regiment 222 that participated in the invasion of Norway. A new Panzerwerfer battery was sent from Germany to be its third battery at the same time. Both battalions retreated into Northern Norway after the Finnish armistice in September 1944 after the Vyborg–Petrozavodsk Offensive.

The 9th Nebelwerfer Battalion was given rockets, redesignated as the first battalion of Werfer-Regiment 71 and sent to North Africa late that year. Most of the second battalion were sent to Tunisia in early 1943, where it surrendered in May. The remainder of the regiment fought in Sicily and mainland Italy for the rest of the war.

Panzerwerfer batteries began to reinforce the Werfer Regiments beginning in mid-1943 and the regiments were paired into brigades beginning in early 1944. In late 1944, the brigades were redesignated as Volks-Werfer Brigades although no organizational changes occurred. A total of fifteen Werfer and Volks-Werfer Brigades were formed, plus one Positional Werfer Brigade (Stellungs-Werfer Brigade) during the war.

== Images of Nebelwerfers ==
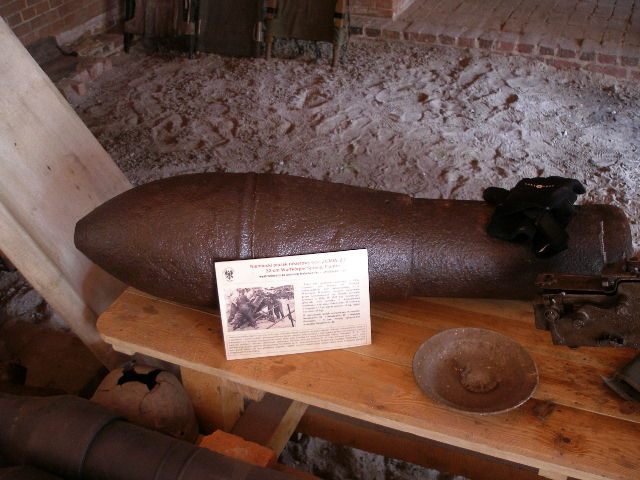
30 cm Nebelwerfer 42 rocket

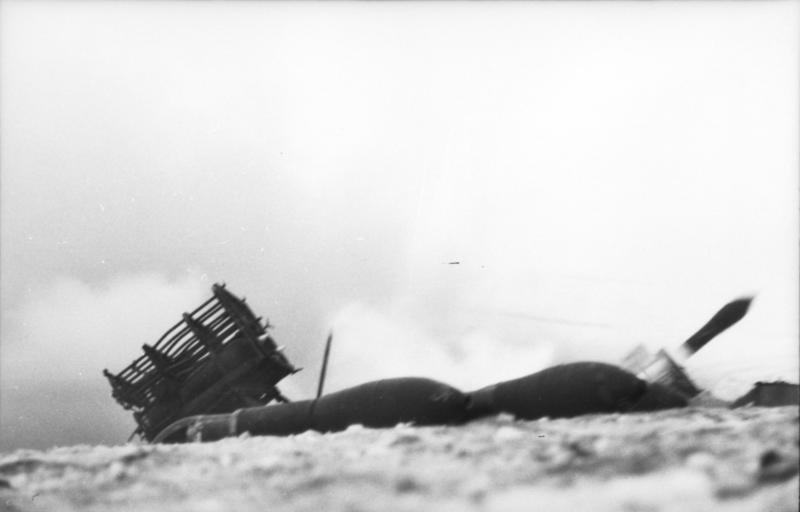
30 cm Nebelwerfer rocket in flight

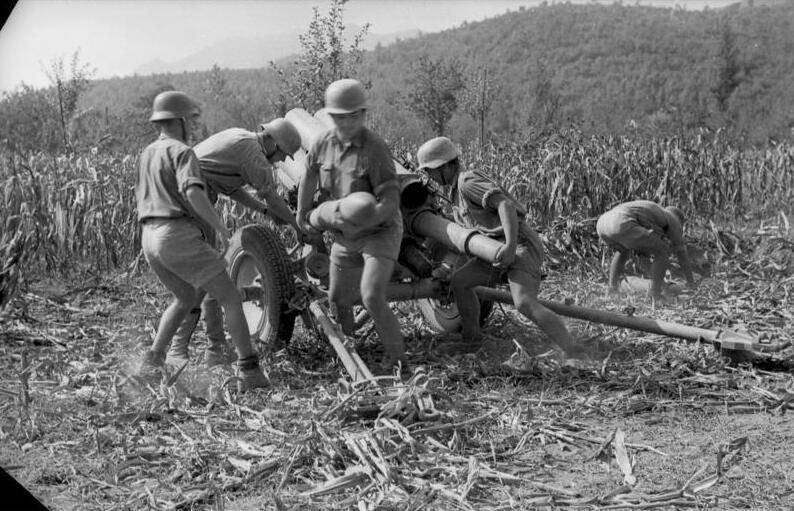
Loading a 15 cm NbW 41 in Italy

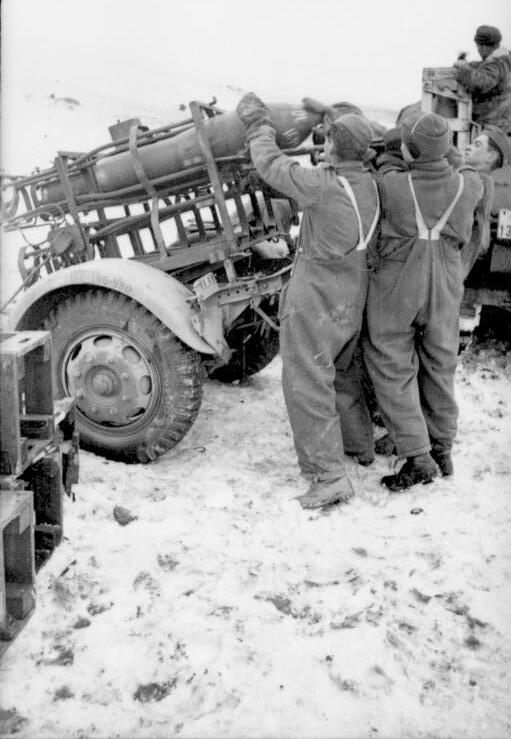
Loading 30 cm rockets

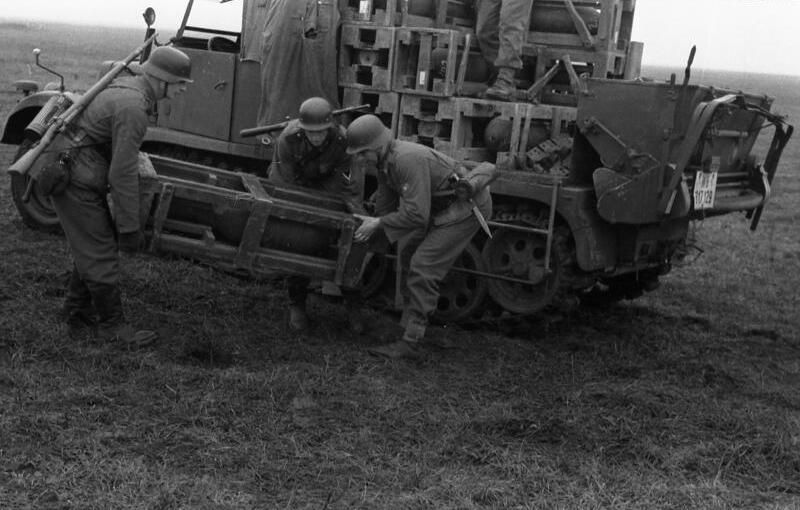
Unloading 28/32 cm rockets

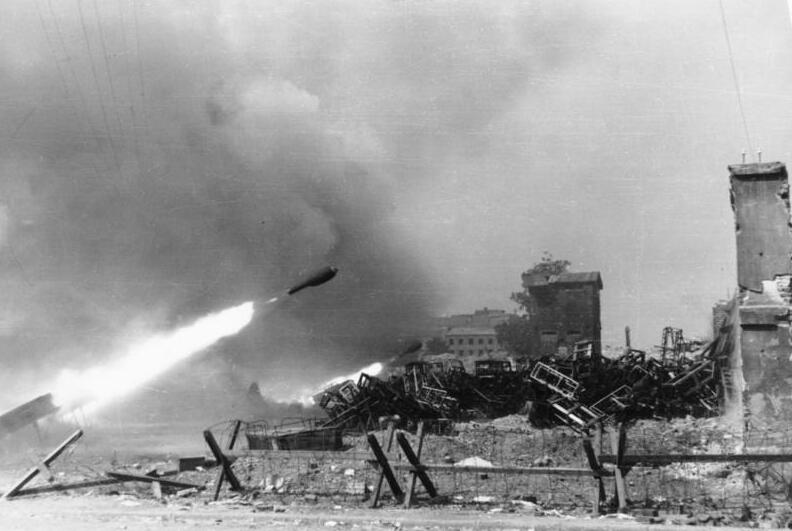
A 28/32 cm rocket in flight during the Warsaw Uprising, with piles of spent cases on the right

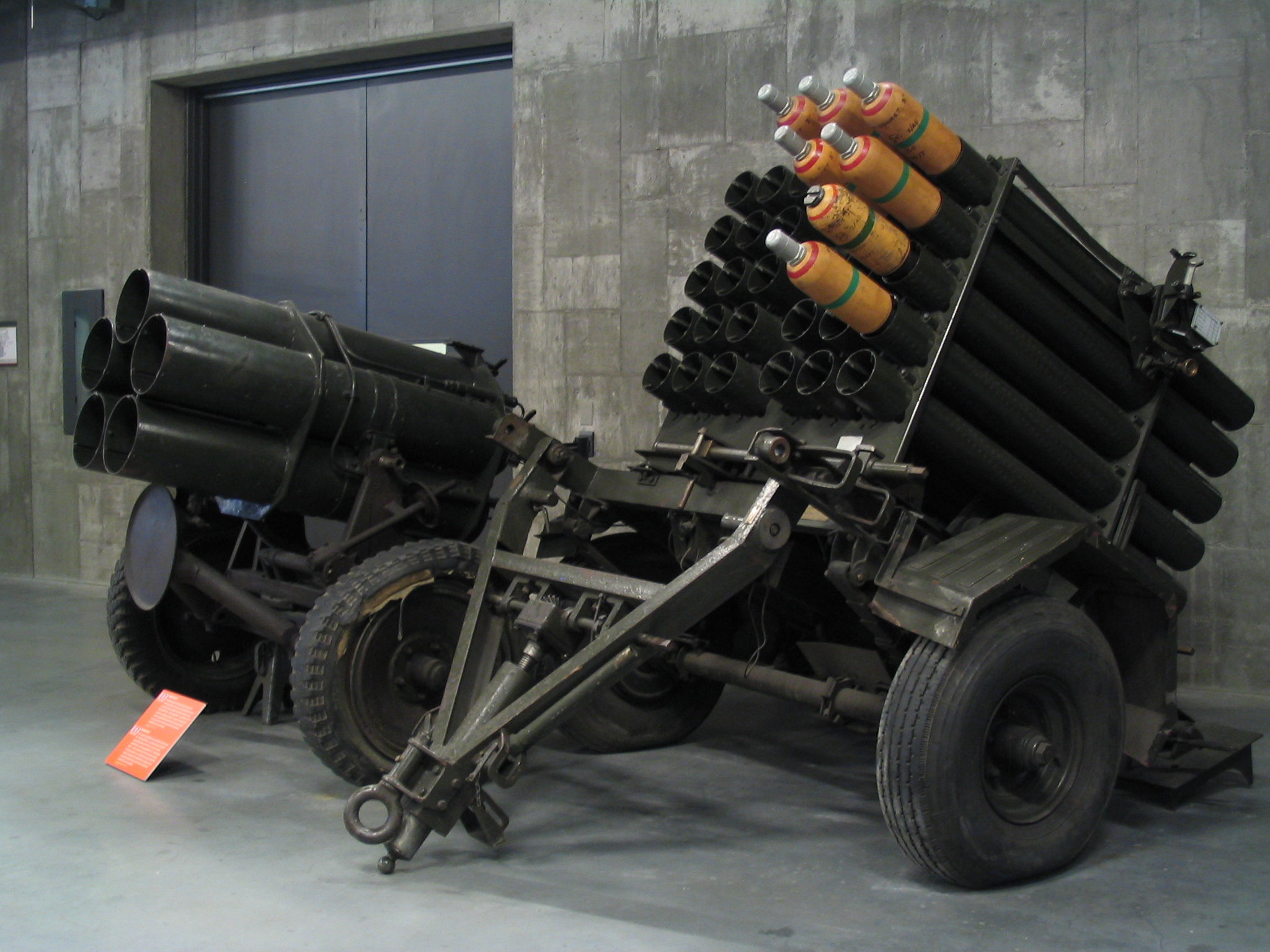
A 21 cm Nebelwerfer 42 and a similar weapon, the British Land Mattress

== See also ==
- Katyusha
- T34 Calliope
- T40/M17 Whizbang, firing 7.2-Inch Demolition Rockets (United States)
- Land Mattress
