= Type 4 40 cm rocket launcher =

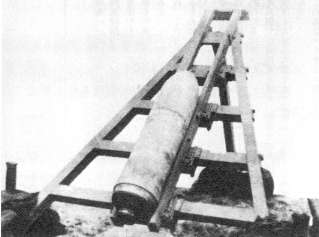
- Type 4 40 cm rocket
- Type: Rocket artillery
- Place of origin: Empire of Japan

Service history
- In service: 1943–1945
- Used by: Imperial Japanese Army
- Wars: World War II

Production history
- Designed: 1944
- Produced: 1945
- No. built: 1,700 wooden launchers during 1945, less than 200 rockets starting May 1945

Specifications
- Mass: 220 kilograms (490 lb)
- Barrel length: 3.22 metres (10 ft 7 in)
- Shell: 508 kilograms (1,120 lb)
- Caliber: 400 mm (16 in)
- Elevation: 40° to +65°
- Muzzle velocity: 220 m/s (720 ft/s)
- Maximum firing range: 3,700 metres (4,000 yd)

The Type 4 40 cm rocket (四式四〇糎噴進, Yonshiki yonjū-senchi funshinhō) was a 400 mm (16 in) rocket used by the Imperial Japanese Army in the final stages of World War II.

== Development and design ==
The Type 4 40cm rocket was developed in the final stages of World War II by the Imperial Japanese Army Technical Bureau, as a relatively low-cost, easy to produce weapon, which had an advantage of greater accuracy over conventional mortars in that it fired a spin-stabilized projectile. Due to its ease of construction, it was produced in limited numbers and distributed to hidden arsenals for use as last-ditch weapons during the projected Allied invasion of the Japanese home islands. Unlike the Japanese Type 4 20cm rocket mortar, the Type 4 40cm rocket did not see action and stocks were confined to the mainland.

The Type 4 40cm rocket was restricted to launch via standardized fixed wooden troughs which were largely constructed by Japanese Army garrison troops, and not steel tubes like the Type 4 20cm rocket mortar. During 1945 construction of the fixed wooden launchers outpaced actual production of the Type 4 40cm rocket. Range of the Type 4 40cm rocket was controlled via variable bleeding of the propellant gases.
