= The Daily Gleaner =

Canadian newspaper in New Brunswick

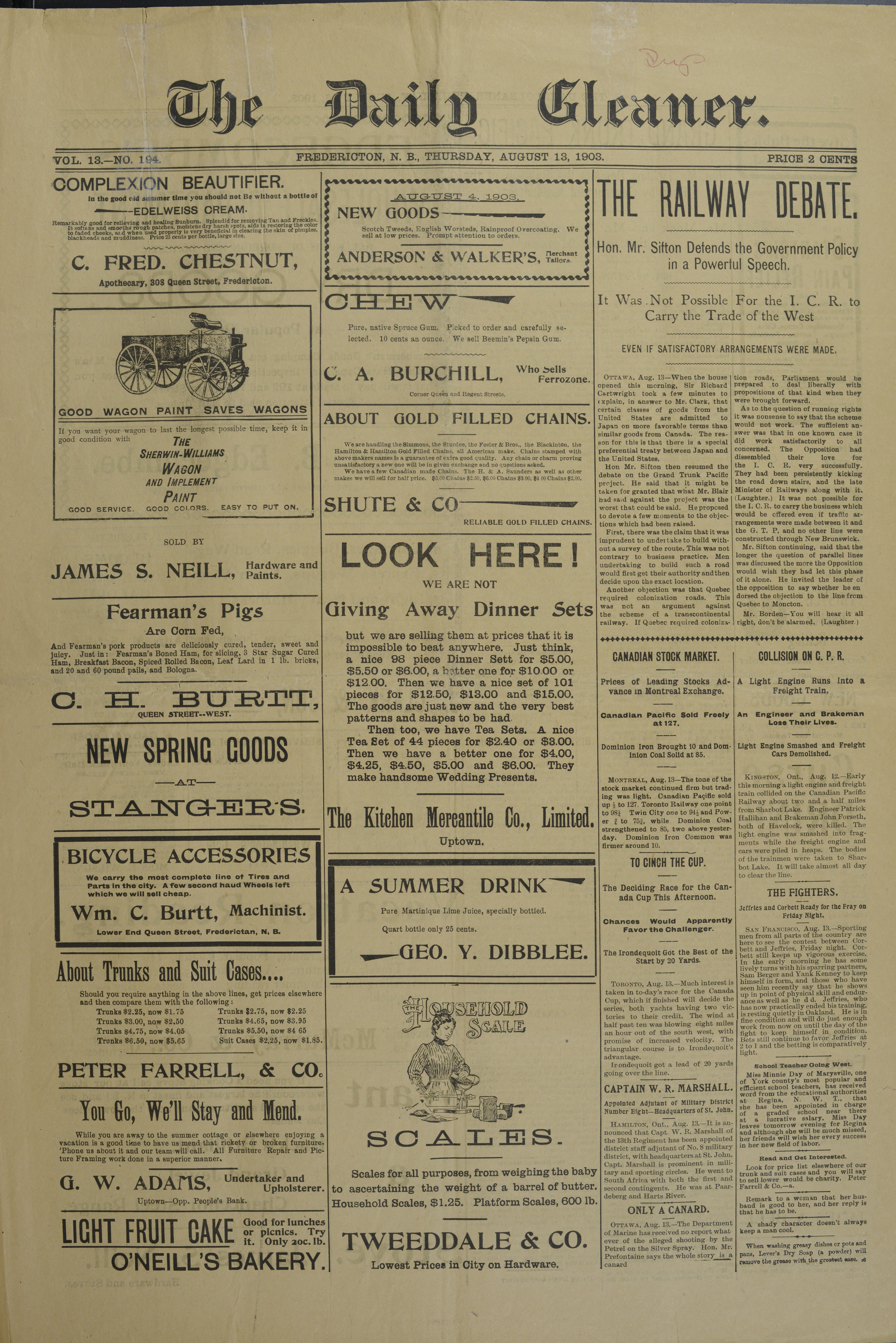
- Front page of the August 13, 1903, issue
- Type: Daily newspaper
- Format: Broadsheet
- Owner: Postmedia Network
- Publisher: James K. Irving
- Editor: Ted Rath
- Founded: 1880
- Headquarters: 71 Alison Boulevard; Fredericton, New Brunswick; E3C 2N5
- Circulation: 16,520 weekdays 16,969 Saturdays (as of 2013)
- Sister newspapers: Telegraph-Journal; Times & Transcript
- Website: https://tj.news/category/daily-gleaner-fredericton/

The Daily Gleaner is a morning daily newspaper serving the city of Fredericton, New Brunswick, and the upper Saint John River Valley. The paper was printed Monday through Saturday, until dropping to Tuesday through Saturday in 2022 and announced it would only publish the printed copy three days a week starting March 2023. Daily news coverage continues online. It began operating in 1880. In April 2006, the paper switched from afternoon to morning publication. The offices of the Daily Gleaner are located on Alison Boulevard on the city's south side.

K.C. Irving bought it in 1968 from Michael Wardell, who had owned it since 1950. In 2022, Brunswick News was acquired by Postmedia.

The paper has its roots in the earlier paper The Gleaner and Northumberland Schediasma, started in 1829.

== See also ==
- List of newspapers in Canada
