= Michael Wardell =

British-born army officer & publisher (1895–1978)

- Born: John Michael Stewart Wardell; 19 June 1895; London, England
- Died: 29 April 1978 (aged 82); Dolgellau, Gwynedd, Wales
- Resting place: Llanfachreth, Gwynedd, Wales
- Citizenship: Canadian
- Occupations: Publisher, army officer

Brigadier John Michael Stewart Wardell (19 June 1895 – 29 April 1978) was a British-born army officer and publisher. In the 1950s and 1960s he owned and operated a publishing company, a daily newspaper and a monthly magazine in New Brunswick. He became a Canadian citizen in 1962. He was a close associate of Lord Beaverbrook from the mid 1920s until Beaverbrook's death in 1964.

== Early life and career ==
Wardell was educated at Eton College and Royal Military College, Sandhurst. He served in the 10th Royal Hussars, a British cavalry unit, during World War I. He was wounded at the Battle of Ypres. Wardell left military service in 1925 with the rank of captain.

Wardell was "a man of high social connections", and a friend of Edward VIII, then Prince of Wales. He lost his left eye in a fox hunting accident in 1925. His eye was pierced by a thorn when his horse jumped a gate overhung with blackthorn and an operation to save his sight was unsuccessful.

== Association with Lord Beaverbrook and World War II ==
Wardell became acquainted with Lord Beaverbrook through his social connections and started working as a manager for Beaverbrook's Evening Standard newspaper in 1926. He became the newspaper's chairman, playing the role of "convenient middleman between [Beaverbrook] and his editorial staff". Wardell was one of Beaverbrook's closest associates, often accompanying him on trips abroad for business and pleasure.

During World War II Wardell returned to military service with the Welsh Guards. He designed a multi-barrelled rocket launcher known as a land mattress, which the British army tested in 1944 but chose not to use on the battlefield. Wardell subsequently worked with Lt. Col. Eric Harris, a Canadian artillery officer, to finish developing the land mattress in September 1944. It was first used by Canadian forces during the Battle of Walcheren Causeway. Canadians used the land mattress in every major operation of the First Canadian Army until the end of the war.

Wardell left the army at the end of the war with the rank of Brigadier and went back to working for Beaverbrook, this time at the Daily Express.

In August 1949, while visiting Lord Beaverbrook at La Capponcina, his villa at Cap-d'Ail, he was witness to Sir Winston Churchill’s first stroke.

== Publisher in New Brunswick ==
In the summer of 1950 Wardell and Beaverbrook visited Beaverbrook's home province of New Brunswick to go salmon fishing on the Restigouche River at the invitation of the province's premier, John B. McNair. While in Fredericton, the provincial capital, Wardell offered to buy the local newspaper, The Daily Gleaner. With the financial backing of Beaverbrook and others, including Sir James Dunn, he also acquired a printing company and a retail store selling books and stationery. These, and the newspaper, were absorbed by the University Press of New Brunswick Ltd. (also known as the Brunswick Press), which Wardell had incorporated in December 1950 "for the purpose of printing, publishing, stimulating the graphic arts, and carrying out the trade of printing and publishing books, newspapers, magazines, pamphlets, and decorative works of all kinds." The corporation was not associated with the University of New Brunswick.

Wardell invested heavily in the venture, purchasing a new headquarters building in downtown Fredericton and a sophisticated printing press which he imported from England. He recruited staff from England and the United States, including the former composing room manager at The Times.

The book publishing arm of the University Press of New Brunswick published New Brunswick authors, beginning with a novel by Grace Helen Mowat in 1951. More than 80 titles had been published by 1967.

In 1956 the University Press of New Brunswick bought the publishing rights to The Maritime Advocate and Busy East, a magazine that had been circulating under that name since 1933 and had its origins in The Busy East, which was launched in 1916 in Sackville, New Brunswick. Wardell renamed his acquisition The Atlantic Advocate and relaunched it as a general interest monthly magazine whose purpose was "to fight the battles of the Atlantic provinces which will win for them a fair place in the life of Canada." The first seven issues contained a serialized memoir by Lord Beaverbrook in which he described his youth and early business career in New Brunswick.

Wardell remained an associate and admirer of Beaverbrook and continued to be on the board of the Daily Express after moving to Canada. He looked after some of Beaverbrook's business and personal interests in New Brunswick and used the Atlantic Advocate and the Daily Gleaner to promote Beaverbrook's image. Wardell was editor in chief of both publications and used them to launch "Beaverbrook-style editorial crusades". These included opposition to restrictive liquor laws and municipal water fluoridation and promotion of efforts to save Fredericton's elm trees from Dutch elm disease. His publications usually supported the Conservative party.

Wardell became a Canadian citizen in 1962.

== Association with K. C. Irving ==
Beaverbrook did not approve of Wardell's lavish spending on such items as new state of the art darkroom equipment, and advised him against adding the book imprint, commercial printing operation, etc. to his holdings. Wardell relied on other backers to raise the additional capital to fund these ventures. In 1957, when he needed cash to repay a financial backer, he raised the money by selling a minority stake in the University Press of New Brunswick to the New Brunswick businessman K. C. Irving. Wardell made an agreement with Irving that the two "would always vote their shares together" and that each would have "the first option to buy out the other".

Irving's acquisition of a stake in the company was not made public. The Gleaner and the Atlantic Advocate both became strong supporters of Irving's interests. Irving was extremely opposed to the "Equal Opportunity" social and tax reforms introduced in the 1960s by Liberal premier Louis Robichaud and Wardell used the Daily Gleaner to attack Robichaud violently, publishing editorial cartoons portraying the Acadian premier as Hitler or Louis XIV.

In 1968 Irving exercised his option to buy out Wardell and gain ownership of the University Press of New Brunswick, including the Daily Gleaner and the Atlantic Advocate. Like his earlier acquisition of part ownership, the buyout remained a secret until 11 March 1969 when it was revealed on the floor of the Senate of Canada by New Brunswick Liberal senator Charles McElman. Irving had already owned all the other daily newspapers in New Brunswick, so the purchase of the Gleaner gave him a monopoly.

== Later life ==
Wardell retired to Lausanne in 1975. He died of a stroke in Dolgellau on 29 April 1978 while on a visit to his family in Wales. He had been married three times and had three sons.
