= 10 cm Nebelwerfer 40 =

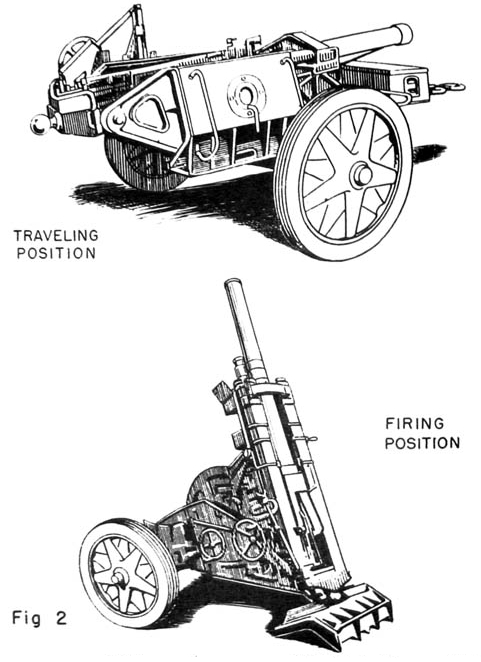
- Allied intelligence diagram of a 10 cm NbW 40
- Type: Mortar
- Place of origin: Nazi Germany

Service history
- In service: 1941–45
- Used by: Nazi Germany
- Wars: World War II

Production history
- Designer: Rheinmetall
- Designed: 1939–40
- Manufacturer: Rheinmetall
- Unit cost: 14000 Reichsmark
- Produced: 1941–42

Specifications
- Mass: 800 kg (1,763.6 lbs)
- Barrel length: 1.72 metres (5 ft 8 in) L/17.7
- Shell: HE: 8.6 kg (18 lb 15 oz); Smoke: 8.9 kg (19 lb 10 oz)
- Caliber: 105 mm (4.13 in)
- Elevation: 45° to 84°
- Traverse: 14°
- Rate of fire: 8–10 rpm
- Muzzle velocity: 310 m/s (1,017 ft/s)
- Maximum firing range: 6.35 km (3.95 mi)

The 10 cm Nebelwerfer 40 (10 cm NbW 40) was a heavy mortar used by Germany during the Second World War. Much like the American M2 4.2 inch mortar it was intended to deliver chemical munitions, such as gas and smoke shells, as well as ordinary high-explosive shells. It was derived from Rheinmetall's Nebelwerfer 51 and 52 prototypes of the late 1930s which were attempts to develop a more accurate and longer-ranged mortar than the 10 cm Nebelwerfer 35. The NbW 40 is one of the better examples of German overengineering since it fired a slightly heavier bomb over twice as far as the NbW 35, but weighed almost eight times more than the earlier model.

It was an innovative breech-loading design with the wheels permanently attached to the carriage, from which it was fired, and which wasn't disassembled for transport. It replaced the NbW 35 in (German: Nebelwerfer "smoke-mortar") battalions belonging to the Chemical Corps of the Heer; exactly how the American fielded their own M2s in chemical mortar battalions. It was replaced by the 15 cm Nebelwerfer 41 multiple rocket launcher from 1941.

== Operational use ==
They began to replace the 10 cm Nebelwerfer 35 mortars from late 1941 in the Nebelwerfer battalions, and were used by Gebirgs-Werfer-Abteilung (Mountain Mortar Battalion) 10 plus the first battalion of the Nebel-Lehr Regiment (Demonstration Regiment) and saw service in the North Africa, Finland and Russia.

== Gallery ==
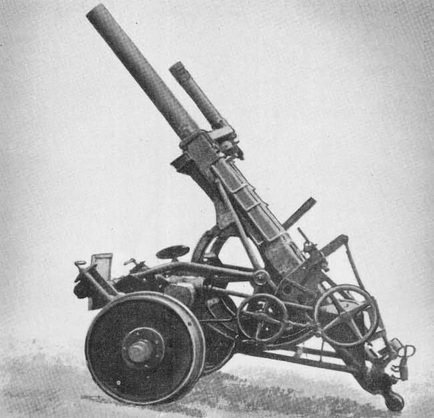
A Nebelwerfer 40.
