= Times & Transcript =

Canadian newspaper in New Brunswick

Coordinates: 46°05′16″N 64°46′56″W

Moncton Times & Transcript

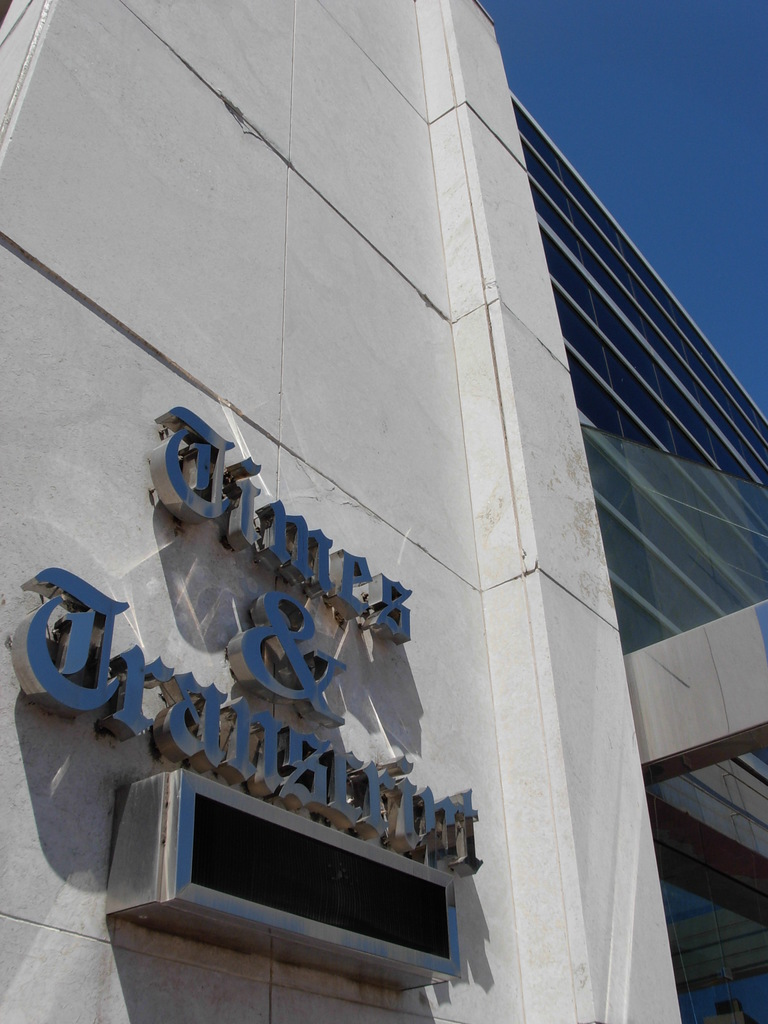
- The Times & Transcript building in downtown Moncton
- Type: Daily newspaper
- Format: Broadsheet
- Owner: Postmedia Network
- Editor: Jackson Doughart (Brunswick News)
- General manager: Shannon Tilley
- Founded: 1868; 158 years ago, as The Times and Westmorland and Albert Local News Journal
- Headquarters: 939 Main Street; Moncton, New Brunswick; E1C 1G8
- Circulation: 33,033 daily 35,468 Saturday (as of 2011)
- Price: $1.00 CAD Monday to Friday $1.50 CAD Saturday; Not published on Sunday
- Sister newspapers: The Daily Gleaner; Telegraph-Journal
- ISSN: 1912-1504
- Website: https://tj.news/category/times-transcript-moncton/

The Times & Transcript is a newspaper from Moncton, New Brunswick. It serves Greater Moncton and eastern New Brunswick. Its offices and printing facilities are located on Main Street in Downtown Moncton. The paper is published by Postmedia Network.

The Times & Transcript building also houses the presses that print all Brunswick News newspapers, including Saint John's Telegraph Journal and Fredericton's The Daily Gleaner. It also produces 14 weekly newspapers in both French and English serving all major communities in New Brunswick.

== History ==
The Times and Transcript was formed by the merger of The Moncton Times and The Moncton Transcript; the merger was announced on October 22, 1982, and the first post-merger issue was published on January 3, 1983. The following tables contain the historical names of both those papers.

Moncton Times

| Name | Years |
|---|---|
| The Times and Westmorland and Albert Local News Journal | 1868–1877 |
| Daily Times | 1877–1932 |
| Moncton Daily Times | 1932–1971 |
| Moncton Times | 1971–1982 |

Moncton Transcript

| Name | Years |
|---|---|
| Daily Transcript | 1882–1905 |
| Moncton Transcript | 1906–1982 |

In May 2022, the Monday print edition was discontinued, and in March 2023 the print edition was reduced to three days a week.

== See also ==
- List of newspapers in Canada
