= 10 cm Nebelwerfer 35 =

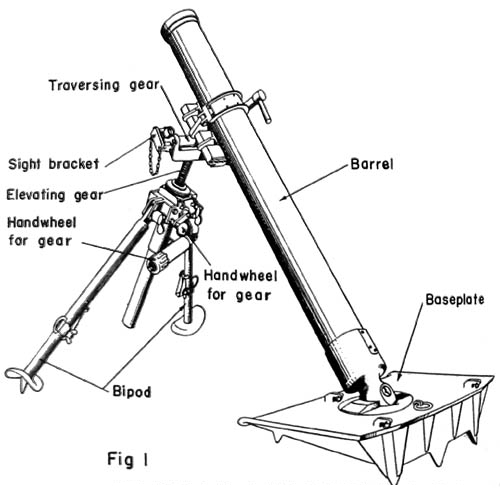
- Allied intelligence diagram of a 10 cm NbW 35
- Type: Mortar
- Place of origin: Nazi Germany

Service history
- In service: 1939–1945
- Used by: Nazi Germany
- Wars: World War II

Production history
- Designer: Rheinmetall
- Designed: 1934–39
- Unit cost: 1,500 RM
- Produced: 1939–41

Specifications
- Mass: 105 kg (231.48 lbs)
- Barrel length: 1.344 m (4 ft 5 in) L/13
- Crew: 7
- Shell: 7.38 kg (16 lb 4 oz)
- Caliber: 105 mm (4.13 in)
- Elevation: 45° to 90°
- Traverse: 28°
- Rate of fire: 10–15 rpm
- Muzzle velocity: 193 m/s (633 ft/s)
- Maximum firing range: 3 km (1.9 mi)

The 10 cm Nebelwerfer 35 (10 cm NbW 35) was a heavy mortar used by Germany during World War II. Much like the American M2 4.2 inch mortar it was intended to deliver chemical munitions, such as gas and smoke shells. Unlike the American weapon it appears to have had an ordinary high-explosive shell from the beginning. It was of conventional design, and was virtually a scaled-up 8 cm GrW 34. It broke down into the standard three loads for transport. The tube weighed 31.7 kg (70 lb), the baseplate 36.3 kg (80 lb) and the bipod 32.2 kg (71 lb). Each could be man-packed for some distance, but small handcarts were issued for longer distances. Each mortar squad consisted of a squad leader, three gunners and three ammunition bearers.

It was initially deployed in (German: Nebelwerfer "smoke mortar") battalions belonging to the Chemical Corps of the Heer; exactly how the American initially fielded their own 4.2 inch mortar in chemical mortar battalions. From 1941 they were replaced by the 10 cm Nebelwerfer 40 and the 15 cm Nebelwerfer 41 multiple rocket launcher.

== Operational use ==
Initially they were deployed in Nebelwerfer battalions numbered 1 to 9, plus the Nebel-Lehr Abteilung (Demonstration Battalion) and saw service in the Battle of France and Russia during Operation Barbarossa.

Specialist units using these mortars were also formed, such as Gebirgs-Werfer-Abteilung (Mountain Mortar Battalion) 10 which was formed in Finland in early 1942 by expanding Nebelwerfer-Batterie 222. This had itself been converted from 8th Battery of Artillery Regiment 222 of the 181st Infantry Division during the invasion of Norway.

Following their replacement in the chemical corps, further uses were found for the mortars, including issue to Fallschirmjager units as heavy mortars.
