= 7.2-Inch Demolition Rocket =

T37
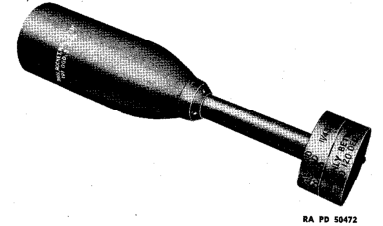
- Type: Surface-to-surface rocket
- Place of origin: United States

Service history
- Used by: United States Army, United States Navy

Production history
- Designer: Caltech
- Designed: 1943
- Produced: 1944–1945

Specifications
- Mass: 61 lb (28 kg)
- Length: 35 in (890 mm)
- Diameter: 7.2 in (180 mm)
- Warhead: C2 explosive
- Warhead weight: 32 lb (15 kg)
- Engine: Solid-fuel rocket
- Operational range: Minimum: 300 yd (270 m); Maximum: 3,400 yd (3,100 m)
- Maximum speed: 110 mph (49 m/s)
- Guidance system: None

The 7.2-Inch Demolition Rocket, also known as the T37, was a 7.2-inch (180 mm) rocket developed and used by the United States military during World War II. Derived from the "Mousetrap" anti-submarine rocket, it was intended for use in demolishing concrete bunkers and fortifications, and saw use from August 1944.

== Development ==
The 7.2-Inch Demolition Rocket was developed by the Physical Chemical Problems branch of the National Defense Research Committee, located at Caltech, in late 1943 as a modification of the existing 7.2 in (180 mm) ASW rocket (Mousetrap) for use against heavily fortified ground targets. Assigned to the United States Navy for development and production in July 1944, An additional high-explosive rocket, the T24, was planned, but was dropped in favor of the T37. The rockets utilized a standard 2.25-inch (57 mm) rocket motor, fitted with a larger-diameter warhead; a longer-ranged version utilizing a 3.5-inch (89 mm) motor was also produced.

== Operational history ==
The T37 saw its first operational use during Operation Dragoon, the invasion of southern France, in August 1944, fired from 120-round "Woofus" launchers mounted aboard Landing Craft Rocket vessels offshore.

The rocket was also intended to be fired from tanks for the clearing of bunkers and anti-tank obstacles. The initial launcher, dubbed "Cowcatcher", was mounted on the front of M4 Sherman tanks; it was quickly found unsatisfactory, and was replaced by 20-round (T40 "Whiz Bang") and 24-round ("Grand Slam") launchers mounted atop the tank's turret. The 20-round launcher could fire its entire loadout of rockets in approximately 10 seconds; however the tank installation was unpopular with crews, as the launcher prevented the tank's turret hatches from being opened.
