= Mattress (rocket) =

British multiple launcher

Land Mattress
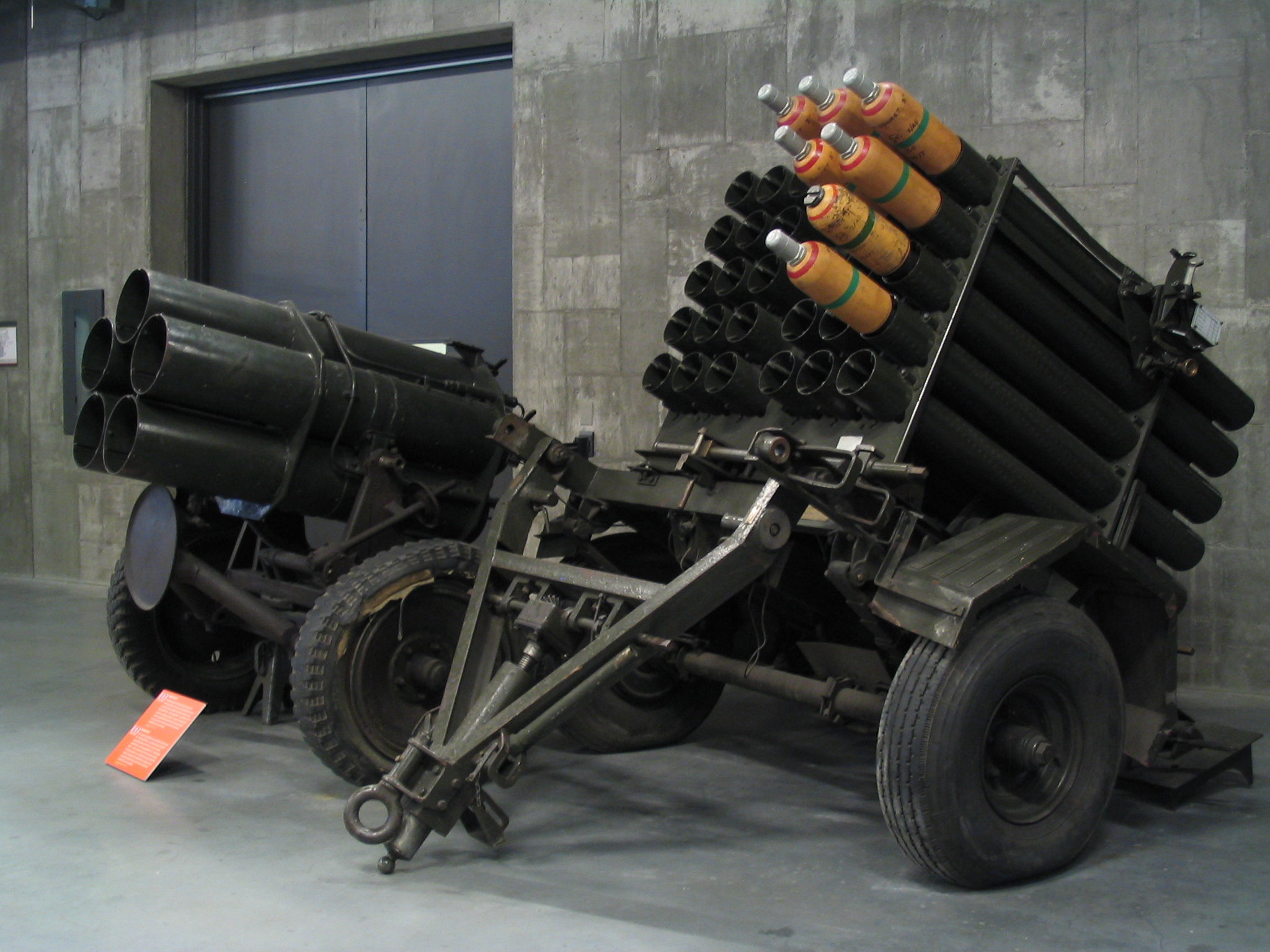
- Land Mattress (right) and German Nebelwerfer (left) at the Canadian War Museum. The brass registration plaque on the Mattress reads Proj., Rocket 3in, No. 8 MK-1. A.C. Cars. 1945. Reg. No. 108
- Type: Multiple rocket launcher
- Place of origin: United Kingdom

Service history
- Wars: World War II

Specifications
- Mass: 1,118 kg (2,465 lb)
- Shell: Rocket length: 1.77 m (5 ft 10 in); Rocket weight: 30.5 kg (67 lb); Warhead: 3.18 kg (7 lb)
- Caliber: 76.2 mm (3 in)
- Muzzle velocity: 353 m/s (1,160 ft/s)
- Maximum firing range: 7,230 m (7,910 yd)

Mattress was the term applied to ground-based British-devised multiple rocket launchers during World War II. Compared with the German and Soviet counterparts (the Nebelwerfer and Katyusha launchers respectively), the western Allies deployed these weapons late in the war. Nevertheless, they did see useful service as artillery support during the crossings of the Rhine and the Scheldt rivers.

== Sea Mattress ==
The first multiple rocket launch system developed by the British was designed to be deployed on warships and landing craft and fired in support of troops in a landing action. The rockets were 5-inch cordite sticks and the launching system, known as a "mattress projector", was capable of projecting a salvo of 16 to 30 rockets 3,000 yards (2.7 km) in around 45 seconds. The weapon was also known as the "Stickleback".

For naval assault on beaches, the specially-outfitted Landing Craft Tank (Rocket) - LCT(R) was devised, each of which carried over a thousand rockets intended to be fired en masse against targets on the invasion beaches and intended for saturating the defenders' positions with rockets. They were used in the Allied invasion of Italy and in the Battle of Normandy.

== Land Mattress ==
The so-called land mattress was a ground weapon named after its naval equivalent. It was originally developed by Lt. Col. Michael Wardell of the British army in 1944. Based on the British Z gun anti-aircraft rockets, it was tested in the summer of 1944 and saw some action with British and Canadian troops, with mixed results. The Land Mattress was based on the 3-inch-diameter (76 mm) tube of the RP-3 or "60-lb" rocket used as an air-to-ground weapon with naval 5-inch shells as warheads and consisted of a 16- or 30-tube launchering system mounted on a towed carriage. The land version had an operational range of 8,000 yd (4.5 mi; 7.3 km). Rounds were fired at a rate of 4 per second. At the crossing of the Scheldt, over a thousand rockets were fired in six hours.

== See also ==
- Landing Craft Tank (Rocket)
- Hedgehog (weapon)
- List of U.S. Army rocket launchers
