= T40/M17 Whizbang =

7.2-inch Multiple Rocket Launcher T40/M17
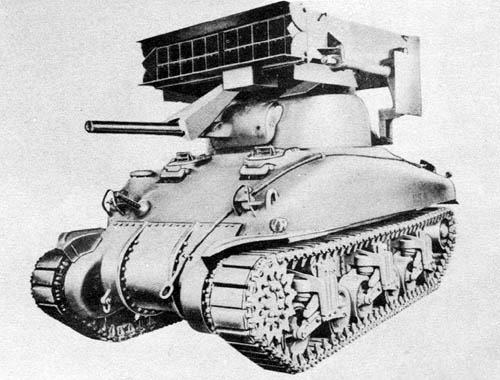
- T40/M17 mounted on an M4 Sherman
- Type: Tank mounted Multiple Rocket Launcher
- Place of origin: United States

Service history
- In service: 1944–1945
- Used by: United States
- Wars: World War II

Specifications
- Mass: 4,615 lb (2,093 kg) (Empty)
- Length: 105 in (2.7 m)
- Barrel length: 90 in (2.3 m)
- Width: 105 in (2.7 m)
- Shell: HE Rocket T37; Chemical Rocket T21
- Shell weight: T37: 61 lb (28 kg); T21: 51.8 lb (23.5 kg)
- Caliber: 7.2 in (180 mm)
- Barrels: 20
- Carriage: M4 Sherman
- Elevation: -5° to 25°
- Traverse: 360°
- Muzzle velocity: T37: 160 ft/s (49 m/s); T21: 680 ft/s (210 m/s)
- Maximum firing range: T37: 230 yd (210 m)

The 7.2-inch Multiple Rocket Launcher T40/M17 Whizbang (sometimes spelled Whiz-Bang or Whiz Bang) was a tank-mounted multiple rocket launcher used by the United States Army during World War II. The launcher was mounted atop 75mm variants of the M4 Sherman, and fired a barrage of 7.2 in (180 mm) rockets from 20 launch tubes. It was developed and used in the late stages of the war, and saw limited combat in 1944–45.

== Design ==
The T40/M17 Whizbang could hold twenty 7.2-inch rockets in two racks of ten rockets each, housed in a box-like frame protected by hydraulically operated doors. These doors protected the rockets from enemy fire, reflecting that it was designed to be used at a close range. The launcher could be aimed by elevating the tank's main gun, and had two firing modes, enabling the operator to fire a single rocket, or a salvo of rockets at a selected rate of fire. After expending all the rockets, the operator could easily jettison the empty launcher by turning the turret towards the side of the tank, fully elevating the gun, disconnecting the cables, and then pulling two handles.

== Service history ==
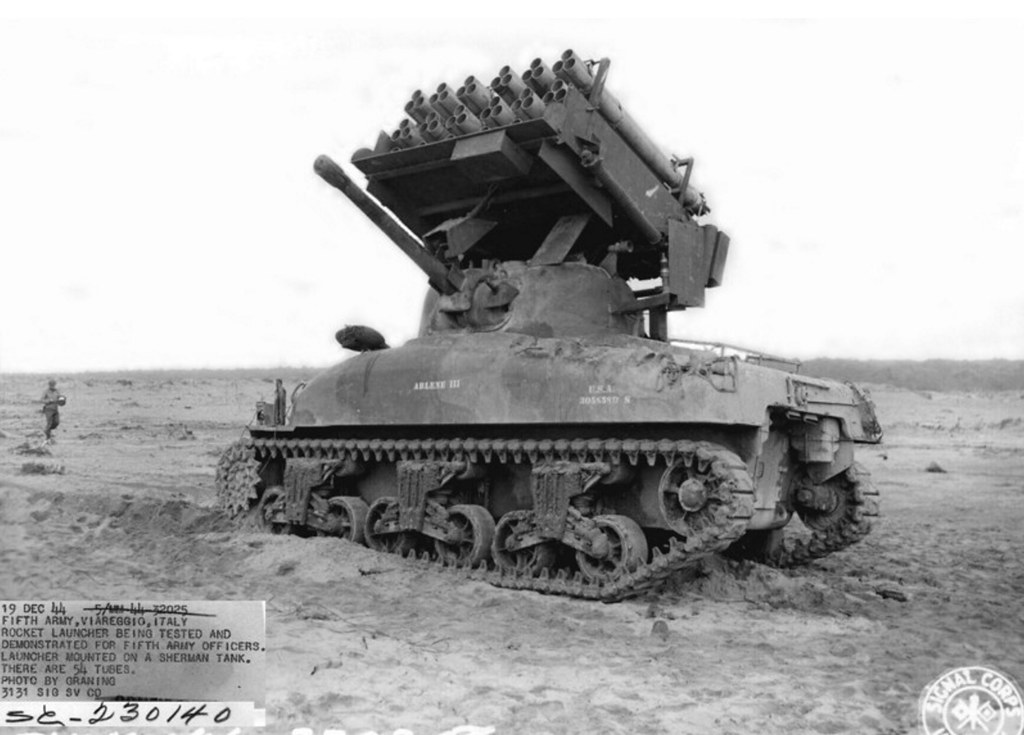
A modified Whizbang mounted on M4A1 Sherman "Arlene III"

The Whizbang was originally intended for use in the allied invasion of France, where it would be used to breach shoreline defenses. No T40s were ultimately deployed during the landings, despite some tanks already being fitted with the mounting brackets. Later the U.S. Army planned to equip a total of 30 Shermans, belonging to the 743rd Tank Battalion, with the system, to be used in a planned operation in Belgium in December 1944. This operation was eventually cancelled due to the German counter-offensive in the Ardennes on 16 December, prompting the U.S. Army to remove the T40s from the battlefield. The launcher ended up not being reinstalled on their intended Shermans, instead, 8 of the launchers were sent to Italy, to be used for artillery fire support. In Italy, the Whizbang's range proved dissatisfactory, prompting the 760th Tank Battalion to rearm at least one of theirs with 54 4.5-inch M10 aircraft rocket launch tubes.

The Marine Corps examined the Whizbang for possible use in the Marianas Campaign in 1944, but ultimately it was not used in the Pacific.

== See also ==
- T34 Calliope – Similar M4 Sherman-mounted rocket launcher firing 4.5 in M8 rockets.

== Bibliography ==
- Anderson, Richard C. (2010). Cracking Hitler's Atlantic Wall: The 1st Assault Brigade Royal Engineers on D-Day. Mechanicsburg, PA: Stackpole Books. ISBN 0-81170-589-7.
- Chamberlain, Peter; Ellis, Chris (1969). British and American Tanks of World War II. New York, NY: Arco Publishing Company. ISBN 0-668-01867-4.
- Green, Michael (2014). American Tanks & AFVs of World War II. Oxford, UK: Osprey Publishing. ISBN 1-78200-931-0.
- United States War Department (1945). 7.2-inch Multiple Rocket Launcher M17 Technical Manual (PDF). Washington, D.C.: War Department.
- Office, Chief of Ordnance, Research and Development Service (1944). Rocket Materiel (PDF).
- Zaloga, Steven (2012). U.S. Marine Corps Tanks of World War II. Oxford, UK: Osprey Publishing. ISBN 1-78096-032-8.
- Zaloga, Steven (2005). U.S. Armored Funnies; U.S. Specialized Armored Vehicles in the ETO in World War II. Hong Kong: Concord Publications Company. ISBN 962-361-085-8.
