= Justa Monk =

Justa Monk (1942-2018) was a leader of the Dakelh people of the central interior of British Columbia. He was known as a strong advocate for indigenous rights, for protection of the environment, especially fishery, and for the maintenance of his Carrier language. The first part of his life was documented in a full-length biography by Bridget Moran.

== Early life ==
Born the youngest of nine children on November 20, 1942, and raised in Tachie , he grew up on the land and was a fluent speaker of the Carrier language. He spoke only Carrier until he was 10 years old and started school at Lejac Residential School, where he was forbidden to speak his language. He and his brother ran away from the abuse at Lejac when he was 14, in grade 7, during a tuberculosis outbreak. He worked in the forest industry for the next ten years. In 1967, when he was 24, while drunk, he stabbed his brother John with a hunting knife, killing him, for which he served a prison sentence of two years less a day. After further education in Dawson Creek he returned to Tachie where he worked for the band, Tl'azt'en Nation, in maintenance, initially driving a snow plow.

== Political career ==
Monk eventually became band manager, the top staff position, and was then elected chief. He focused on bringing electricity and clean water to the village and on improving roads. He was also instrumental in founding Tanizul Timber, a company owned by Tl'azt'en Nation, which obtained Tree Farm License 42, the first tree farm license owned by a First Nation.

He was the founding chief of the Carrier Sekani Tribal Council, serving from 1981 to 1983 and again from 1990 to 1994. In this role he pushed for self-government for indigenous people and for the closure of the Prince George office of the Department of Indian Affairs and for the reassignment of its budget to First Nations. He played a major role in the ultimately successful opposition to the Kemano Completion Project, which would have further reduced the flow of water in the Nechako River.

He also served as co-chair of the Northwest Treaty Tribal Nations. At the provincial level, he served two terms as co-chair of the First Nations Summit.

He continued to serve his community until poor health intervened. He was elected Tl'azt'en Nation chief in December 2013 and served until his resignation in 2017.

== Personal life ==
Monk was married twice. With his first wife, Theresa Monk, he had five children: Sharon Monk, Bonita Monk, Darcy Monk, Justa Monk Jr., and Shania Monk.

He died on March 14, 2018, in Tachie. He was buried in Tachie on March 19, 2018.
