= Edward John =

Canadian politician and lawyer

Minister of Children and Families of British Columbia
- In office November 1, 2000 – June 5, 2001
- Premier: Ujjal Dosanjh
- Preceded by: Gretchen Brewin
- Succeeded by: Gordon Hogg

Personal details
- Born: July 8, 1949 (age 76) Tl'azt'en Nation, British Columbia
- Party: British Columbia New Democratic Party
- Occupation: Lawyer

Edward John (born July 8, 1949) is a prominent First Nations political leader in Canada.

== Early life ==
The son of Louis and Amelia John, he was born in the Carrier village of Tachie, along the north shore of Stuart Lake, about 60 km from Fort St. James, British Columbia. He holds the name 'Ukailch'oh (Carrier Linguistic Committee spelling, often spelled Akile Ch'oh) in the Lusilyoo clan. He has three grown children from his first marriage. He is currently married to former Musqueam chief Wendy Grant-John.

He attended Lejac Residential School, Prince George College, and Notre Dame University College in Nelson, B.C. before receiving a B.A. in sociology (with distinction) from the University of Victoria in 1974 and an LL.B. from the University of British Columbia in 1979. He practiced law as a solo practitioner in Prince George, British Columbia from 1981 to 1993. In 2004 he received an honorary Doctor of Laws degree from the University of Northern British Columbia.

== Political career ==
John served as an elected Councillor of Tl'azt'en Nation from 1974 to 1990 and as elected Chief from 1990 to 1992. From 1984 to 1988 he was Chief of the Carrier-Sekani Tribal Council. From 1992 until 1999 he was Chief Treaty Negotiator for the Carrier-Sekani Tribal Council, a position he resumed in 2006. He is also chairman of the board of Tanizul Timber and Teeslee Forest Products, companies owned by Tl'azt'en Nation. For his service to Tl'azt'en Nation he was awarded the title of Grand Chief of Tl'azt'en Nation.

A fluent speaker of Carrier and one of the few people considered eloquent public speakers in Carrier, John was the founding President of the Yinka Dene Language Institute. He was also involved in establishing the University of Northern British Columbia. He played a prominent role in the Interior University Society, the regional organization whose pressure led to the creation of UNBC, and subsequently served on the Implementation Council and the Interim Governing Council, the predecessor to the Board of Governors.

John was the First Nations representative to the First Ministers Conference on aboriginal constitutional rights from 1983 to 1987. In 1991, along with the late Squamish Chief Joe Matthias, he helped to create the First Nations Summit, the organization representing the British Columbia First Nations involved in treaty negotiations with Canada and British Columbia. This group produced the tripartite Task Force Report that led to the current British Columbia Treaty Process.

In June 2016 John was elected to his eleventh term on the Task Group (political executive) of the First Nations Summit, of which he has been a member almost continuously since 1993. His position on the Task Group ended in June 2019 when he chose not to run again. From June through mid-November 2019 he served as an adviser to the First Nations Summit.

On November 1, 2000 he was appointed to the provincial cabinet as Minister for Children and Families, serving until the change of government in June 2001. In the election of May 16, 2001 he ran unsuccessfully as the New Democratic Party candidate for Member of the Legislative Assembly from the Prince George-Omineca riding. In 2015 he was appointed as a special advisor on Aboriginal Child Welfare by Liberal Premier Christy Clark.

John also plays a prominent role at the national level in the Assembly of First Nations. In October 2005 he represented the AFN at the Second Indigenous Peoples' Summit of the Americas in Buenos Aires. In January 2011 he began a three-year term as the North American Representative to the United Nations Permanent Forum on Indigenous Issues., of which he became Chair in May 2012. He was appointed to a second three-year term effective January 2014 and served until the end of his membership in the Forum in January 2017.

On August 7, 2024 John was again elected Chief of Tl'azt'en Nation.

== Honours ==
In 2012 John received an Indspire Award in the area of Politics. and an honorary Doctor of Laws from the University of Victoria. In May 2018 he received the Alumni Award of Distinction from the Allard Law Alumni Association of the University of British Columbia School of Law.

== Criminal charges ==
On November 14, 2019, John was charged with four counts of having sexual intercourse with a woman without her consent. The alleged criminal acts date to 1974 and involve the same woman, whose identity is protected by court order. The Carrier Sekani Tribal Council issued a statement indicating that as the matter is before the courts it would have no comment. On July 8, 2020 he entered a plea of not guilty. His trial began in provincial court in Prince George on July 25, 2022. On the second day of the trial, the complainant broke down under cross-examination by John's lawyer, who brought out inconsistencies in her testimony and produced a photograph showing that John had long hair at the time, contradicting her testimony that his hair was short. After an extended consultation with the complainant the Crown determined that the prospects for conviction were poor and entered a stay of proceedings, dropping the charges.

== Electoral results ==
2001 British Columbia general election: Prince George–Omineca
Party	Candidate	Votes	%	Expenditures
Liberal	Paul Nettleton	10,469	61.65	$58,110
New Democratic	Edward John	3,156	18.58	$22,087
Unity	Eldon Matte	1,685	9.92	$27,420
Green	David Usher	1,026	6.04	$1,144
Marijuana	Will DeWolf	646	3.81	$924
Total valid votes		16,982	100.00	
Total rejected ballots		84	0.49	
Turnout		17,066	73.70	
Source: Elections British Columbia

British Columbia provincial government of Ujjal Dosanjh
Cabinet post (1)
Predecessor	Office	Successor
Gretchen Brewin	Minister of Children and Families; November 1, 2000 – June 5, 2001	Gordon Hogg
