= Tlʼaztʼen Nation =

First Nation in Canada

- Band No. 617
- People: Dakelh
- Headquarters: Fort St. James
- Province: British Columbia

Land
- Main reserve: Tache 1
- Reserves: List: Tsay Cho 4; Kuz Che 5; Bihlkʼa 6; Dzitline Lee 9; Sisul Tlʼo Kʼut 14, 21; Teeslee 15; Carsoosat 17; North Road 19; Bihlʼkʼa Chah 20; Tlʼo Ba 22; Metso A Choot 23; Tsaz Cheh Koh 24; Natazutlooh 25; Tsaz Chech 27, 28; Camsell Lake 30; Dlah Koh 31; Jus Kʼay Tlʼoh 32; La Tse Cho Diz I 33; Tse Bay Ha Tine A 34; Shas Dzuhl Koh 35; Ta Duhlʼ 36; Tsun Tine Ah 37; Keom Cho 38; Nakʼa Lat 39; Wha Tʼa Noo 40; Chuz Teeslee 41; Noo Kat 42; Tanizul 43; Ihchʼaz Uz Ta Tsoh 44; Dzin Tlʼat 46; Kʼay Noo 47; Skooby Island 48; Teh Nooʼn Che 49
- Land area: 27.86 km^{2} (10.76 sq mi)

Population (2025)
- On reserve: 445
- On other land: 43
- Off reserve: 1068
- Total population: 1556

Government
- Chief: Edward John
- Council: 2024-2027: Leslie Aslin; Christian Harpe; Cecelia Harvey; Mina Holmes; Beverly John; Jermaine Joseph; Vera Mattess

Tribal Council
- Carrier Sekani Tribal Council

Website
- tlaztennation.ca

Tlʼaztʼen Nation is a First Nations band located along the north shore of Stuart Lake near the outlet of the Tache River, in the northern interior of British Columbia. The main village belonging to Tlʼaztʼen Nation is Tache (often spelled Tachie in English), 60 km north-west of Fort St. James.The small settlements of Middle River (Dzitʼlainʼli).on Trembleur Lake and Grand Rapids, along the Tache River between Stuart Lake and Trembleur Lake also belong to Tlʼaztʼen Nation. The main administrative offices are in Tache, as a school - Eugene Joseph Elementary School, Daycare, Head Start, Health Unit, Education Centre/ Learning Centre for Adults, RCMP/ Justice Office, Public Works building that supplies diesel and gasoline, water treatment plant, a newly built youth recreation center (2012), a Catholic and Christian church, one in Old Tache and one in "sunny side", a volunteer fire department with a fire hall; rec sites include a paintball park, a basketball court and a hockey rink. The village of Portage (in Carrier Yekooche) once belonged to the Tlʼaztʼen Nation but separated in 1994 as Yekooche First Nation. The village of Pinchie once belonged to Tlʼaztʼen Nation separated on March 12, 2019 and is now the Binche Whutʼen First Nation Prior to 1988 Tlʼaztʼen Nation was known as the Stuart-Trembleur band. Tlʼaztʼen Nation formerly belonged to the Carrier Sekani Tribal Council but is no longer a member.

The people of Tlʼaztʼen Nation are called Dakelh (pronounced [tákʰɛɬ]) in their own language, Carrier in English. Tlʼaztʼen means "people at the edge of the bay" in the Dakelh language. Approximately 1,700 people are members of Tlʼaztʼen Nation. Of these, roughly 900 live off reserve.

Tlʼaztʼen Nation owns a not-for-profit company Tanizul Timber Ltd which managed the Tree Farm License 42 for the Nation from 1981-2009. In November 2009, the company surrendered this Tree Farm License and entered into a Community Forest Agreement with the Province of British Columbia November 2009. It also manages the John Prince Research Forest jointly with the University of Northern British Columbia under Chuzgun Resources Ltd.

== Prominent members ==
- Russell Alec
- Edward John
- Justa Monk
