= Disappearance of Immaculate Basil =

Missing person, British Columbia, Canada

Coordinates: 54.654°N 124.760°W

Immaculate "Mackie" Mary Basil
- Mackie Basil
- Born: December 8, 1985
- Disappeared: June 14, 2013 (aged 27); Kuz Che Reserve, BC, Canada
- Status: Missing for 12 years, 11 months and 25 days
- Occupations: Casual worker; part-time secretary; substitute teacher's assistant; homemaker
- Parents: Samuel Basil (father); Patricia Joseph (mother)
- Family: Jamison (son), Ida (sister), Crystal (sister), Peter (brother), Nick (brother), Keith (cousin), Bonnie Joseph (cousin), Vanessa Joseph (cousin)

Immaculate "Mackie" Mary Basil is an indigenous Canadian woman who went missing early on Friday, June 14, 2013, near the Kuz Che Indian Reserve, 70 kilometres (43 mi) north of Fort St. James in British Columbia, Canada, aged 27. It was reported that she had last been seen with her cousin and another man leaving a house party. Her disappearance is considered uncharacteristic of her personality.

== Life before disappearance ==
The daughter of Samuel Basil and Patricia Joseph, Immaculate Mary "Mackie" Basil had a son, Jamison, who was 5 years old when she disappeared. Basil had three sisters and three brothers: Crystal, Ida, Samantha (deceased), Nick, Peter, and Travis (deceased). Basil was born on December 8, 1985, which is also the Roman Catholic Feast of the Immaculate Conception. It is likely the date influenced her name.

Basil grew up in the foster care system with her sisters Ida and Crystal. Ida has said that their experience there bonded them; they called each other daily at 10 am. Mackie was part of the Tl'azt'en Nation, based out of Tachie, south of the Kuz Che Reserve. Basil lived in Fort St. James at the time of her disappearance, working part-time as a secretary and as a teacher's assistant at a school. She had recently split from her long-time partner, the father of Jamison.

She was known to be an introvert who rarely partied and was not known to drink or take drugs. She preferred to spend time at home cleaning, decorating, completing tasks, being online, talking with her sisters, or spending time with her son, and was also very careful about who she spent time with. It came as a surprise to her family that she was reported to have gone to a party alone and had been drinking.

Ida said of her sister that she was a "caring, beautiful person" and that "she'd help out in any way she can if you asked her for help."

Basil had recently separated with her common law husband just before the time of her disappearance. News of the breakup was also a surprise to the family, and the cause of the separation is unknown. It is not public knowledge how long she was with her husband.

== Disappearance ==
Locations in the disappearance of Immaculate Basil
1 Tachie Indian Reserve - location of the party.
2 Kuzche Reserve near Fort St. James - location of the hunters cabin.
3 Leo Creek - location of the accident and the trucker sighting of Basil hitchhiking alone.

The events leading up to Basil's disappearance are not all known, but she was seen at a house party on the Tachie Reserve before she left with a man named Victor and her cousin Keith shortly after midnight. It is not substantiated, but it was reported that she attempted to hitchhike alone after the truck that she was in got into an accident.

Basil was not driving a vehicle at the time of her disappearance. Uncharacteristically for her for an overnight trip, she did not bring her makeup bag or an extra set of clothes, and she did not own a cell phone. She was reported to have been wearing grey yoga (capri) pants, white shoes, and a black hoodie with a maple leaf on the front. She also had a dark blue iPod Shuffle with white earphones on her when she went missing. None of the items that went missing with Mackie were ever found.

Basil attended a house party on Thursday, June 13, 2013, in Tachie. It is not public knowledge who also was at the party that night, or how many people were there, but Vanessa Joseph believes that it was mostly Basil's cousins. One cousin Keith, and a man named Victor, who was known to Vanessa, were also there. The party was at a house that was a 20-minute walk from Basil's house.

Large portions of Mackie's timeline the night that she went missing are not public knowledge. She was alone for much of the night and after midnight, she left with Victor and her cousin Keith, who haven't made public what happened.

Approximate Timeline of Basil's Movement When She Went Missing to When She Was Reported Missing
Note	Start	End
Basil attended her aunt's funeral.	17:00 13 June 2013	13 June 2013
Basil attends a house party on Tachie Reserve.	13 June 2013	00:00 14 June 2013
Basil is seen by her brother Peter while she is picking up a 26-ounce bottle of vodka. Mackie mentions that she was with Victor and Keith.	00:00 14 June 2013	00:00 14 June 2013
Allegedly Basil left with Victor and Keith to get some red tin from a hunter's cabin near Kuzche. They travelled in a white and blue truck. Her location is unknown after she left the party; the truck got into an accident on Leo Creek Forest Service Road.	00:00 14 June 2013	10:00 14 June 2013
Victor is seen walking down a street in Tachie, in clothes wet up to his chest.	10:00 14 June 2013	
Basil misses daily phone call with sisters Crystal and Ida. They suspect that she may be at her brother Nick's house where there wasn't a phone but they live too far to physically check.	10:00 14 June 2013	
Crystal and Ida call people who know Basil, searching for her.	10:00 15 June 2013	
The two sisters learn that Mackie wasn't at Nick's.	16 June 2013	
They call the RCMP to file a missing person's report.	17 June 2013	
The RCMP meet Crystal in person for the first time regarding the report. The RCMP start interviewing people from the party.	18 June 2013	

According to the RCMP's report to the family, Victor and Keith reported that they were riding in a white truck with Basil the night of the disappearance. Sometime early on June 14, 2013, the truck that Keith, Victor, and allegedly Basil, were traveling in got into an accident on Leo Creek Forest Service Road between Tachie and Kuzche, near a place called "16 kilometer." The accident happened while the truck was traveling away from the cabin. Vanessa said the accident was apparent because there were parts of the truck near a tree that was broken in half. Vanessa said that she learned that an attempt was made to get a black truck at the hunter's cabin in Kuzche to pull the truck. Victor and Keith both told the RCMP that Basil separated from them after the accident. RCMP press releases indicated that she separated from the two other men shortly after their truck got stuck in the mud.

At about 10 am on Friday, June 14, 2013, Victor was seen walking down the street in Tachie wearing clothes that were wet up to his chest. Vanessa, Joseph, and Ron witnessed this in front of Ron's house. They thought it strange, but not knowing that Basil was missing at the time, didn't investigate further. After learning that the truck that Victor was driving was in an accident near Kuzche, Vanessa considered it odd that Victor would be back in town so soon, on foot. The black truck from the hunting cabin was not driven back to Tachie but was left on Leo Creek Forest Service Road, an hour away by vehicle from where Victor was seen walking.

== Investigation, search and awareness efforts ==
Both Victor and Keith were given polygraph tests. The RCMP reported to the family that both men were cooperative. They were also interviewed by a forensic psychologist. The psychologist's report to the family stated that they found nothing suspicious. Vanessa believes that the police interviewed everyone involved.

No one revealed to the family that Basil left the party with Keith and Victor until after police interviews on 18 June 2013, when the RCMP disclosed this to the family. According to relatives, the family did not hear much from the RCMP in the first year after she went missing, though the RCMP issued a press release to the public on the third anniversary of Mackie's disappearance.

The RCMP took part in the search effort for about a week after 18 June 2013. They used dogs, and there was a hailstorm and unfavorable rainy weather on the weekend of 22 June 2013. Extensive ground and air efforts were made in the days after Basil's disappearance, carried out by numerous search-and-rescue organizations, RCMP air services, relatives, and locals. In the time since search efforts have been made only by search-and-rescue and the Tl'azt'en band. An approximate 20 km radius area was searched in the area around Tachie/Kuzche.

=== Tachie/Kuzche geography ===
Tl'azt'en nation, which includes the communities of Tachie, Kuzche, and Dzitl’ainli, is located on the northeastern shore of Stewart Lake, British Columbia. Tachie is about 45 minutes north of Fort St. James, and Kuzche is located about 45 minutes north of Tachie. The area consists of numerous rivers, ponds, lakes, and rolling hills. Most of the land is covered in forest, and the area has one main highway to Fort St. James, numerous logging roads, and a railway that runs through it and through both Tachie and Kuzche; industry in the area consists mainly of mining and logging. Both Tachie and Kuzche are accessible by road as well. The railroad is no longer in use and the local sawmill, owned by Tanizul Timber, has been shut down since before Basil's disappearance. Various animals are known to the area, including cougars, black and grizzly bears, coyotes, and wolves.

Numerous posters, billboards and news articles have gone up in an effort to raise awareness about the disappearance. The RCMP released numerous press releases, including one during the month marking the three-year anniversary of Basil's disappearance. In 2016, shortly after the third anniversary press release, the Tl'azt'en nation also offered a $20,000 reward for information leading to Basil's recovery at the behest of her brother Peter Basil.

== Theories ==
Due to family connections and a young child whom Basil was known to be affectionate toward, in addition to no history of running away, it is considered unlikely that she ran away. Although they are skeptical that she ran away, the RCMP are hesitant to attribute her disappearance to foul play. This leaves animal attack or accident as possible explanations for Basil's disappearance. The RCMP haven't ruled out the possibility of foul play playing a role in Basil's disappearance.

=== Animal attack, accident, or misadventure ===
Although there are numerous dangerous wild animals that are known to live in the area around Tachie/Kuzche, the theory of an animal attack is brought into question due to the lack of evidence of an attack found by the searchers involved in the thorough ground and air search. There was no confirmed recovery of any of the items that the young mother had when she went missing, nor was there any discovery of blood or other remains confirmed to be hers. If she went missing due to an accident or misadventure, then it is also reasonable to presume that she would have walked to where she met her demise. This would have been well within the range of the search party who were looking for her remains, which were never found.

A number of unsubstantiated rumors and inconsistent reports happened after Basil went missing. The RCMP followed up on many and reported to her family their findings.

=== Known debunked sightings ===
Basil was reported to have been seen on the morning of June 14, 2013 by either forestry workers, tree planters, or a truck driver. The rumor was that she was seen attempting to hitchhike. The RCMP followed up with these claims and determined that they were false.

Another false sighting was near Saik'uz reserve, south of Vanderhoof, British Columbia.

=== Foul play ===
Basil was allegedly riding with two men, Keith and Victor, in a white pickup truck; at the time of her disappearance, they were heading to a hunter's cabin near Kuzche reserve to pick up some unused roofing tin to deliver to an elder. This story was only substantiated by Keith and Victor with no other witnesses.

Neither man has talked with the family about exactly what happened that night. Keith is younger than Basil. Victor was about 48 years old at the time and not from Tachie. In addition to being reported to have been mean to his ex-wife, he has a history of convictions for violent crime (files 22683-1-K, 24087-1-KC, 25237-2-A, 27961-6-C and 29420-1) and at least one charge of sexual assault (file 27961-6-C). Most of these crimes had resulting court appearances in the Dease Lake court.

Considering the area's remoteness and the timing of Basil's vanishing, it is unlikely that she disappeared due to a stranger abduction. However, according to the FBI, stranger abductions involving women mostly are motivated by sexual assault and are also the most likely to involve the use of a firearm.

== Similar disappearances ==
Basil disappeared in an area that is part of what is known as "the Highway of Tears corridor." Mackie's cousin Bonnie Marie Joseph went missing along the same corridor. Joseph was last seen by her cousin Joanne hitchhiking east towards Prince George from Vanderhoof on Saturday, September 8, 2007.

== See also ==
- Highway of Tears
- List of people who disappeared mysteriously: post-1970
