= Nazko (disambiguation) =

Nazko is a community in the Central Interior region of British Columbia.

Nazko may also refer to:

- Nazko Cone, a volcano in the Central Interior of British Columbia, Canada
- Nazko River, a river in the Central Interior of British Columbia
- Nazko First Nation
