= Lejac =

Locality in British Columbia, Canada

Coordinates: 54°03′00″N 124°45′00″W

Lejac is a locality on the Canadian National Railway line in the Nechako Country region of British Columbia, located on the south shore of Fraser Lake between the communities of Fraser Lake (W) and Fort Fraser (E).

== Name origin ==
Lejac derives its name from the now-closed Lejac Residential School, which had been named for one of the co-founders of the residential school at Fort St. James. Though not on Indian reserve itself, Lejac is a community of the Nadleh Whut'en First Nation of the Dakelh (Carrier) people, whose main community, Nadleh Village, is adjacent to the original site of the fort, which is located in Beaumont Provincial Park. Nadleh was also referred to as Fort Fraser, though today's non-native community of that name was based around the CNR stop of that name, and is on the opposite side of the Nechako River, which is connected to the outflow from Fraser Lake by the short Nautley River, whose name comes from the Nadleh Whuten people. Fort Fraser was the site of the first non-native agricultural undertakings in British Columbia.

== Catholic pilgrimage site ==
Lejac is most notable for a now-annual pilgrimage by Catholic faithful to the grave of Rose Prince, or "Rose of the Carrier", who had been a student at the residential school and is revered by Catholics for her uncorrupted body being discovered during the moving of coffins from an older cemetery to a new one. Many believe she will eventually be sainted, and so far has been approved by the Vatican for preliminary steps towards beatification, a precursor to official sainthood.

== See also ==
- List of Canadian residential schools
