= Grand Rapids, British Columbia =

Community

Coordinates: 54°47′N 124°53′W

Grand Rapids is a Dakelh community northwest of Fort St. James, British Columbia, Canada, located at the confluence of the Tachie and Kuzkwa Rivers near Trembleur Lake. It is on the site of Kuz Che Indian Reserve No. 5, formerly named Grand Rapide IR No. 5. Nearby is Tsay Cho IR No. 5, formerly named Stevan IR No. 4. These reserves are under the administration of the Tl'azt'en Nation. Kuz Che is an anglicization of the Carrier name, which is K'uz̲che.

== See also ==
- List of communities in British Columbia
