= Fawnie Nose =

Coordinates: 53°16′11″N 125°08′56″W

Fawnie Nose (1933 m / 6342 ft, prominence 872 m) is the highest summit of the Fawnie Range of the Nechako Plateau in the Central Interior of British Columbia, Canada. The range is located north of the West Road River and to the south of the Natalkuz Lake portion of the Ootsa Lake reservoir.

== See also ==
- List of noses
