= Lynda Prince =

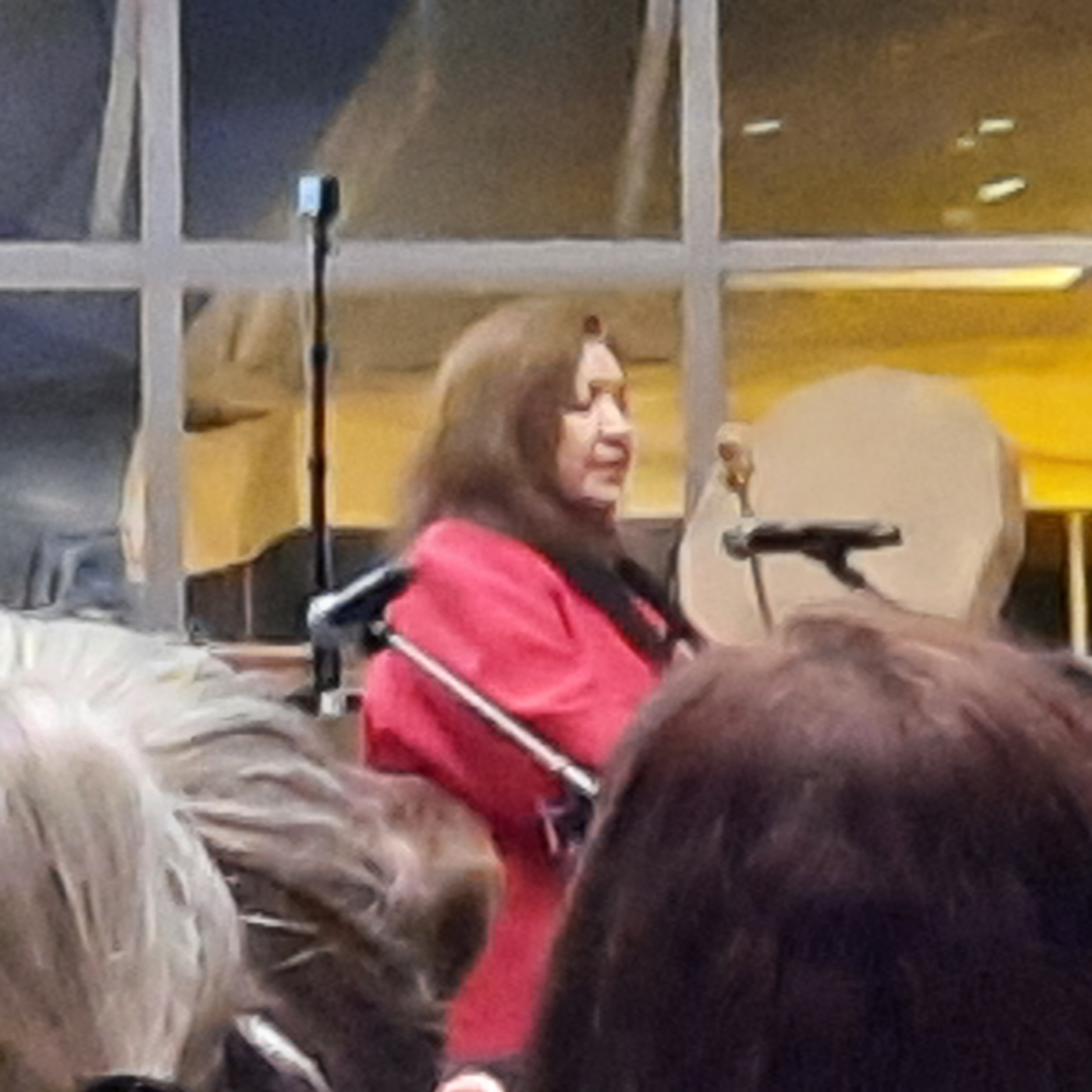

Carrier Sekani Tribal Council Tribal Chief
- In office 1994–1997
- Preceded by: Justa Monk
- Succeeded by: Mavis Erickson

Nak'azdli Band Member

Personal details
- Relations: Raymond Prince
- Mother tongue: Carrier language

Lynda Prince is a Canadian First Nations advocate and politician who served as Tribal Chief of the Carrier Sekani Tribal Council from 1994 to 1997. She is considered Canada's first female Grand Chief.

She was born in Tache, British Columbia to a family of 15 siblings. She was sent to a residential school at 5 years old, and experienced the abuse first had.

She was appointed Executive Director of the Carrier Sekani Family Services in 1993, a position she held for a year. She was reelected as Tribal Chief in 1995 and 1996. She worked on Carrier self-government, and a framework agreement was signed in April 1997. She called for a full scale enquiry into the abuse at residential schools. She was succeeded by Mavis Erickson.

Her uncle, Raymond Prince, fought in the Second World War with the Seaforth Highlanders of Canada.

Prince's experiences in the Catholic run residential school pushed her away from Christianity, through later in life she reconnected with the religion. She doesn't self identify as a Christian, despite holding those beliefs and working with Christian Indigenous groups in North America and worldwide. she brought 120 drums to Native communities in the United States for "Christian ceremonies as a way of encouraging American Indians to worship in the ways of their culture".

In 1999 she joined a mission of 100 Indigenous leaders to the Israeli Knesset. She was involved in the creation of the Indigenous Embassy, Jerusalem, and has endorsed the embassy being led by the Maori community.
