= Nechako Lakes =

Group of lakes in Canada

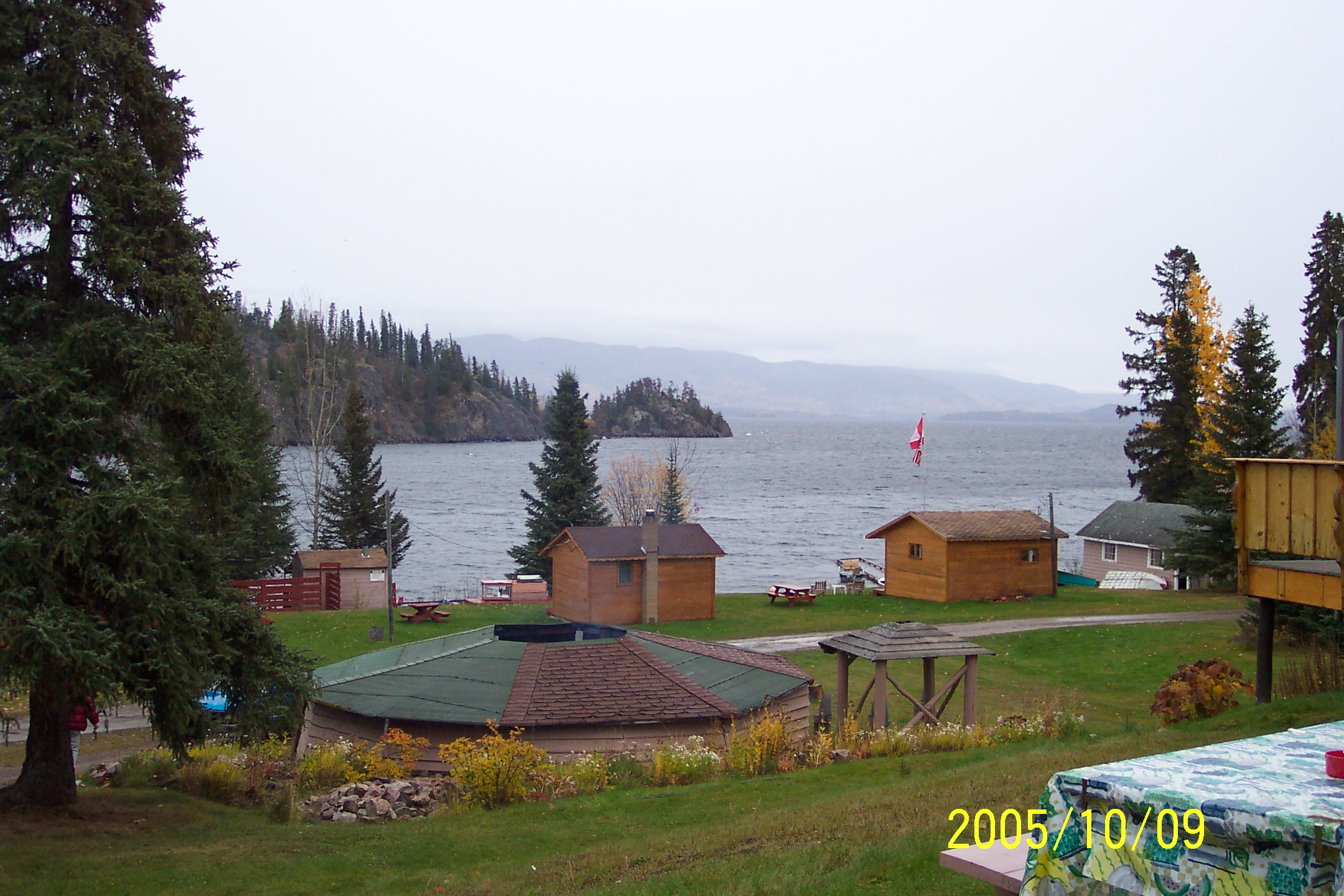
Babine Lake

The Nechako Lakes is a term for group of lakes in Northern British Columbia, Canada on the Nechako Plateau. Major lakes in the group are Babine Lake, Francois Lake, Ootsa Lake, Trembleur Lake, Takla Lake and Stuart Lake.

"Nechako Lakes," "Nechako Lakes District" and "Lakes District" is used as a regional identifier for several organizations in the area, such as School District #91 (Nechako Lakes).

The more common name for the northern part of the region the lakes are located in is the Omineca Country, for the southern the Nechako Country.

The lakes are also a provincial electoral district.

== See also ==
- List of lakes of British Columbia
