= Kwah =

- Kw'eh

Carrier People leader
- Succeeded by: Hoolson (brother)

Personal details
- Born: 1755 Stuart Lake, B.C.
- Died: 1840 (aged 84–85) Fort St James, New Caledonia
- Relations: Raymond Prince Rose Prince Lynda Prince
- Mother tongue: Carrier language

Kwah is the usual English form of the name of the Carrier leader Kw'eh. He was born around 1755 and died in 1840. Chief Kw'eh was chief of his Keyoh called Nak'azdli in the late eighteenth and early nineteenth centuries, In his time, few people lived at Nak'azdli (Fort Saint James). Carrier people from other keyohs were attracted to Kwah's village due to the North West Company (later Hudson's Bay Company) fort there, which was established after 1806. In 1892, Nak'azdli village was designated Nak'azdli Indian Reserve no1 under the Indian Act.

Chief Kwah was a significant Keyohwhudachun or Keyoh Chief, and his Keyoh territory was situated along the Stuart River. The Keyoh system was the customary land governance structure (pre 1846) of the Stuart Lake Carrier peoples for at least 500 years and it continues today. Each Keyoh consists of an extended family and a Keyoh Chief (Holder or Noble) appointed per keyoh system customs. Furthermore, each Keyohwhudachun could decide to contribute surplus resources at a gathering, attended by members of other keyoh(s).

Chief Kw'eh also held the name Ts'ohdai in the Lhts'umusyoo (Beaver Clan).

Chief Kw'eh was among those who received the explorer Simon Fraser in 1806 when local Carrier people brought his foundering canoes into Tsaooche village, another family's keyoh in Sowchea Bay. In gratitude, Simon Fraser presented Kw'eh with red cloth. In 1997 the red cloth was returned to the state of Canada by Kwah's descendant, Ts'ohdai Pete Erickson, in a symbolic gesture of the deplorable relationship between the State of Canada and Dakelh people.

Chief Kw'eh is also known for the incident in which, in 1828, he spared the life of his prisoner, the fur trader James Douglas, who later became the first governor of the united Colony of British Columbia. He was also known for his acquisition of an iron dagger prior to the arrival of the first Europeans in the area, presumably one traded in from the coast. He is an ancestor to a large percentage of the Carrier people in the Stuart Lake area.

Chief Kw'eh was featured on the Carrier Northwest Indian Heritage dollar issued in 1978.

Due to his importance, traders called him "King", and then his sons "Prince". The title Prince was taken by his third son, who took over as Chief from Kwah's brother, and the surname Prince was applied once missionaries began converting the community. Kwah had 16 children.

== Family ==
=== Immediate Family ===
- Hoolson, brother. Native name Œhulhtzœn. Succeeded Kwah as Chief.
- Tsalekulhyé, father.

=== Descendants ===
- Simeon le Prince
  - Chief Joe Prince
    - Alec Prince
      - Raymond Prince
        - Lynda Prince
  - Louise Prince (1873-1946)
  - Louis-Billy Prince (1864-1962)
- Unknown Son
  - Jean-Marie Prince
    - Rose Prince
