= Baezaeko River =

Location
- Country: Canada
- Province: British Columbia
- District: Cariboo Land District

Physical characteristics
- Source: Fraser Plateau
  - coordinates: 52°50′55″N 124°36′27″W
  - elevation: 1,620 m (5,310 ft)
- Mouth: West Road River
  - location: Fraser Plateau
  - coordinates: 53°8′6″N 123°40′17″W
  - elevation: 835 m (2,740 ft)
- Discharge
  - location: stream gauge 08KG003
  - average: 2.36 m^{3}/s (83 cu ft/s)
  - minimum: 0.220 m^{3}/s (7.8 cu ft/s)
  - maximum: 24.7 m^{3}/s (870 cu ft/s)

Basin features
- Tributaries
  - left: Coglistiko River

The Baezaeko River /bɪˈziːkoʊ/ is a tributary of the West Road River, one of the main tributaries of the Fraser River, in the Canadian province of British Columbia. It flows through the Fraser Plateau to the West Road River.

The Baezaeko River's name is derived from a Dakelh word besikoh meaning "basalt river", referring specifically to the black basalt from which arrowheads were made. Another meaning is ″where there is obsidian in the river″.

== Course ==
The Baezaeko River originates in and flows through the Fraser Plateau. From its source it flows generally east, then northeast and north. It flows through three Nazko First Nation Indian reserves: Baezaeko River Indian Reserves 25, 26, and 27. The Coglistiko River joins the Baezaeko from the west.

== See also ==
- List of tributaries of the Fraser River
