= Mount Swannell =

Mountain in British Columbia, Canada

Coordinates: 53°21′10″N 125°16′12″W

Mount Swannell, 1821 m (5974 ft), prominence 771 m, is a mountain in the Fawnie Range of the Nechako Plateau in the Central Interior region of British Columbia, Canada. It is located to the south of the outlet of the Entiako River into Natalkuz Lake, which is part of the Nechako Reservoir. The northernmost of the summits of the Fawnie Range and is in the northeastern end of Entiako Provincial Park, it is the only named summit of the Fawnie Range within the park.

== Name origin ==
Mount Swannell, like other similar names in British Columbia, is named for Frank Swannell, a notable British Columbia Land Surveyor who mapped much of the province by foot and horseback in the late 19th and into the mid 20th Century. He mapped this region in the 1920s, producing detailed topographic and trigonometric surveys, leaving such publications as:

- Sketch Map of the [Nechako] River and Lake System, 1920-21-22
- Topographic plan 14T1: Morice, Nanika, Tahtsa Lakes, 1923
- Topographic plan 11T2: Eutsuk Lakes area, 1924
- Topographic plan 3T255: Portion of Range 4 Coast District, 1923

Most of his output of maps, studies, photography and journals are searchable online from the Royal British Columbia Archives, or available through the Ministry of Forests Library of the Ministry of Natural Resources.

== See also ==
- Telegraph Range
- Quanchus Range
