= Northwest Indian Heritage Dollars =

The Northwest Indian Heritage Society of British Columbia issued three sets of commemorative trade dollars in 1977–1979, produced by the Sheritt Mint in Fort Saskatchewan. The majority were made of nickel, but small numbers, with the same face value, were made in silver, and in some cases also in gold. 100,000 of the nickel version of each coin was minted. Each was marked as losing its value as currency on a date within the year of issue.

Series I - 1977
Name	Designer(s)	Honoree	Link to Images
Nishga dollar	Norman Tait	Chief Mountain	https://en.numista.com/67852
Haida dollar	Robert Davidson	Charles Edenshaw	https://en.numista.com/48811
Salish dollar	Rose Sparrow	Khahtsahlano	https://en.numista.com/70641
Kwakiutl dollar	Lloyd Wadhams	Mungo Martin	https://en.numista.com/67857
Nootka dollar	Joseph Smith	Maquinna	https://en.numista.com/130738

Series II - 1978
Name	Designer(s)	Honoree	Link to Images
Carrier dollar	Louise Joseph	Chief K'wah	https://en.numista.com/170251
Shuswap dollar	Ernie Philip	Chelouis	https://en.numista.com/170250
Tsimshian dollar	Roy Vickers	Legaic	https://en.numista.com/170249
Okanagan dollar	Toussowashet	Nicola	https://en.numista.com/170252
Kootenay dollar	Charlotte Basil; The Basil; Agatha Jacobs	Isadore	https://en.numista.com/170248

Series III - 1979
Name	Designer(s)	Honoree	Link to Images
Capilano dollar	Vernon Brown	Mary Capilano	https://en.numista.com/70642
Nimpkish dollar	Vernon Brown	Kakasolas	https://en.numista.com/79505
Cowichan dollar	Vernon Brown	Sahelton	https://en.numista.com/70643
