= Raymond Prince =

Canadian soldier (1923–1996)

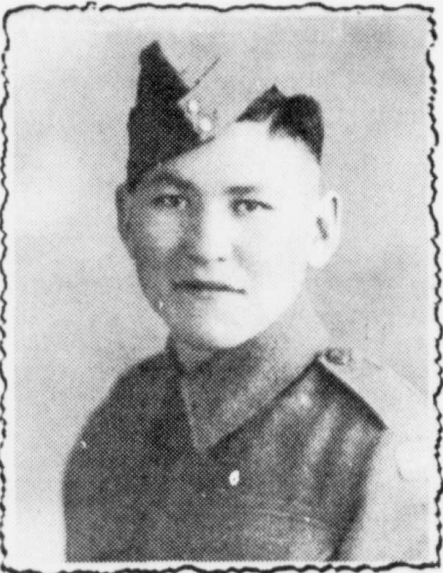

Personal details
- Born: August 31, 1923 Grand Rapids, British Columbia, Canada
- Died: December 3, 1996 (aged 73)
- Resting place: Fort St James, British Columbia, Canada
- Relations: Lynda Prince
- Known for: Indigenous Veterans Advocacy
- Mother tongue: Carrier language
- Military career
- Allegiance: Canada
- Branch: Canadian Army
- Years active: 1940–1946
- Rank: Private
- Unit: Seaforth Highlanders
- Conflicts: Allied invasion of Sicily

Raymond Prince (1923-1996) was a Native Canadian soldier from the Nak'azdli Band in the Second World War. He spent much of his life advocating for Native Canadian veterans, and working to preserve the Carrier language.

== Early life ==
Price was born to parents Alex and Rosalie in Grand Rapids, British Columbia. He grew up in Grand Rapids and Fort St. James, in the Nation Lakes region of the BC interior. At the age of seven, he was sent to the Lejac Residential School. There he suffered abuse, poor food (including spoiled milk and fish), and was forbidden from speaking his native language, Carrier. He ran away after three years, traveling over 100 km to return to Fort St. James and his parents. He spent the next six years working in the bush.

According to his niece Lynda Prince, he may have been the only Native to successfully escape a residential school - others tried but were caught or froze to death in the elements.

== Military service ==
At the age of 16 or 17, Price volunteered to enlist in the Canadian Army. He was placed in the Seaforth Highlanders of Canada, along with his brothers Fredrick, Walter, and Theodore Prince, and was trained in Scotland. He participated in the invasion of Sicily, and fought mostly in Italy, but also France, Belgium, Holland, and Germany. He caught pneumonia on the front lines of Europe. He was honourably discharged in 1946.

== Post war and advocacy ==
"They told us we were fighting for King and country and freedom of speech. They didn't live up to it. We didn't get justice."

— Raymond Prince

Following Prince's discharge from the army at 24, he found that he couldn't drink, vote, or own land. He also was told that he no longer had Indian status, since he had signed those rights away when he enlisted. Specifically, an Indian agent knocked on his door and told him he was no longer a band member and had to leave. Those forms had been forged, he later said. He also wasn't given war benefits, allowed into the Royal Canadian Legion Hall, and wasn't allowed to march with non-Native veterans during Remembrance Day.

He had 5 children, worked as a heavy construction operator, and devoted his life to advocating for Native Canadian veterans and preserving the Carrier language. He taught Carrier through free lessons in Prince George, and helped translate the bible. He also founded the Carrier Linguistic Society of Ft. St. James, and contributed to recordings of the language.

In 1987, he was able to regain his Native status with help from federal politician Iona Campagnolo.

Prince was the regional representative for Carrier and Sekani veterans. In 1993 he produced and co-directed a documentary with Raymond Yakeleya on other Native veterans who had faced discrimination, like Frank Sam Jimmy Quaw. His documentary may have been the first produced by a Native elder in Canada, and catalyzed the creation of the National Aboriginal Veterans Monument.

He was a delegate to the First People's Forum on the Canadian Constitution in Vancouver in 1992. He was president of the local branch of the United Native Nations and the Dekehl Trappers Association.

Prince died in 1996.
