= Nechako Range =

Mountain range in British Columbia, Canada

Coordinates: 53°25′00″N 124°38′00″W

The Nechako Range, 1795 km^{2}, is a ridge-like hill-range on the Interior Plateau of the Central Interior of British Columbia, located southwest of the city of Prince George and to the east of the similar Fawnie Range. Formerly known as Nechako Mountain, the range lies between the West Road River to its south and the Euchiniko River to the north, and Knewstubb Lake to its northwest (part of the Ootsa Lake reservoir).
