= Parkland Elementary School =

Parkland Elementary School may refer to:

- Parkland Elementary School (Coquitlam)
- Parkland Elementary School (Farmington)
- Parkland Elementary School (Quesnel)
- Parkland Elementary School (Louisville, Kentucky)
