= Swannell =

Swannell may refer to:

- Swannell Ranges, a subrange of the Omenica Ranges in British Columbia, Canada
- Mount Swannell, a summit in the Fawnie Range of the Nechako Plateau of British Columbia
- Swannell River, a river of British Columbia

== People with the surname ==
- Blair Swannell (1875–1915), English rugby union player
- Frank Swannell (1880–1969), Canadian surveyor, after whom the Canadian geographic items are named
- John Swannell (born 1946), English photographer
- Robert Swannell (born 1950), British businessman
