= Middle River (British Columbia) =

Coordinates: 54°52′00″N 125°07′00″W

The Middle River, or in the Carrier language (Dakelh) Dzitl'ainli Koh, is a river in the Omineca Country of the northwestern Central Interior of British Columbia, Canada, flowing southeast from the outlet of Takla Lake into Trembleur Lake over a distance of approximately 35 kilometres (22 mi). The river is part of the route of the Stuart River-Takla Lake salmon run, which comes up the Fraser River via its tributaries the Nechako and Stuart Rivers and terminates at Takla Lake, and the route of the unfinished Dease Lake Extension of the British Columbia Railway runs along the river's left (north) bank. The community of Middle River, including the Dzitline Lee Indian Reserve 9. O K'Ay Wha Cho 26, another Indian reserve, is located on the west bank of the river between Takla and Trembleur Lakes.

== See also ==
- List of rivers of British Columbia
