= Mary John Sr. =

Mary John Sr. CM (June 15, 1913 – September 30, 2004) was a leader of the Carrier people of the central interior of British Columbia in Canada. She was known as "Mary John Sr." to distinguish her from her daughter-in-law, also named Mary John. She became well known both for her political and social activism and as a role model, a person of enormous integrity, strength, and gentleness.

== History ==
John was born at Lheidli (near Prince George, British Columbia) to Anzel Quaw. She grew up in Saik'uz (Stoney Creek) village, raised by her mother and her stepfather Johnny Paul. She was a member of the Tachek clan, whose crests are cariboo and ruffed grouse. She survived the flu epidemic of 1918, during which, only five years old, she had to care for her sick mother. At the age of eight she was sent to the residential school in Fort St James where she learned English. The next year she moved to the newly established Lejac Residential School, which she attended until she was fourteen years old. At the age of sixteen she married Lazare John, with whom she had twelve children.

In 1942, she helped to found the local chapter of the British Columbia Homemakers' Association, of which she was the first President. She later served as district president. Although the Homemakers' Association was intended by the Department of Indian Affairs to teach homemaking skills to native women, she and other women turned it into a vehicle for political action. In the 1950s, with the help of her friend Bridget Moran, she founded the Welfare Committee, which worked to place aboriginal children in aboriginal foster homes in or near their own community.

In 1980, along with her daughter Helen, and elders Celina John and Veronica George, she established the Stoney Creek Elders' Society. The Elders' Society built the Potlatch House and the associated campground as economic development initiatives. Still more important, the Elders' Society provided the impetus for social change and political action.

In the 1980s, she began her liaison work with the Royal Canadian Mounted Police. She invited the staff to her fishing camp for a barbecue every summer. She eventually served on the Aboriginal Advisory Committee to the Commanding Officer of RCMP "E" Division, a province-wide body, of which she was a founding member.

Mary John was greatly concerned with the preservation of her culture and language, of which she was a fluent speaker. In the 1970s she taught the Carrier language and culture at St. Joseph's School, the Catholic school in Vanderhoof, British Columbia, as well as several conversational Carrier courses for adults. She was one of the founders of the Yinka Dene Language Institute of which she became the Permanent Honorary Chair. She was one of the principal contributors to the Saik'uz Children's Dictionary and other teaching materials. From 1992 until her death, she worked tirelessly with linguist Bill Poser to document her dying language.

== Honors ==
In her later years, Mary John received many honors. In 1978, she was honored as Vanderhoof Citizen of the Year, the first time that a native person had received this award. In 1995 she received an honorary degree from the University of Northern British Columbia. In 1997 she was made a Member of the Order of Canada with the following citation:

A well-loved and respected elder of the Carrier Nation of the Stoney Creek Reserve in British Columbia, she has dedicated her life to helping others. She is the strong force and influence behind the success of many positive initiatives and was one of the originators of the Friendship House, a community centre for Native and non-Native people. She survived many hardships to emerge as a respected elder, counsellor, midwife, educator and conciliator between the Aboriginal and non-Aboriginal communities. Now in her eighties, she is still promoting the Carrier culture to the younger generation.

In 2002, she received the Queen's Jubilee Medal.

In January 2008, the Vanderhoof Public Library opened the Mary John Collection, a collection of 800 books on First Nations topics created in her honor.

== See also ==
- Notable Aboriginal people of Canada

== Bibliography ==
- Eulogy delivered by Colleen Erickson
- Moran, Bridget and Mary John (1989) Stoney Creek Woman: The Story of Mary John. Arsenal Pulp Press. ISBN 1-55152-047-8.
- Order of Canada record,
