= Dominic Patrick =

Dominic "Dick" Patrick was a Canadian war hero and prominent activist for Indian civil rights. A Carrier Indian, he was born in 1920 in Saik'uz village in British Columbia and lived most of his life there. In early 1942 he enlisted in the Canadian army. He served in the Canadian 4th Armoured Division with the rank of Gunner as a member of the crew of an M10 tank destroyer.

On September 10, 1944 during the Battle of Moerbrugge near Moerbrugge, Belgium, his unit was having difficulty locating enemy positions. Patrick went ahead alone to reconnoiter, encountered an enemy machine gun nest, attacked it, and singlehandedly captured 55 German soldiers. For this action he received the Military Medal from King George VI on October 23, 1945 at Buckingham Palace. The citation reads:

The Argyll and Sutherland Highlanders of Canada and the Lincoln and Welland Regiment secured and for two days held a small bridgehead on the east side of the canal at Moerbrugge during which time a bridge was built. The bridgehead was limited in depth to about 300 yards due to heavy mortar and machine gun fire. Gunner Patrick was a member of a 17‐pounder M‑10 machine gun crew which with two tanks of the 29th Canadian Armoured Reconnaissance Regiment crossed the bridge at 0700 hours, 10 September 1944. After the M‑10 had shot several suspected enemy positions, the actual location of the enemy positions became hard to estimate accurately due to poor visibility and fog. Gunner Patrick asked permission to go ahead on foot and carry out reconnaissance to locate enemy positions. Despite the enemy fire he succeeded in getting into the middle of an enemy machine gun position and there opened fire with his light machine gun. His daring attack completely surprised the enemy, who totalled three officers and 52 other ranks into surrender and cleared out a strong point which had pinned the infantry down for approximately two days. The extension of the bridgehead was due in large part to the daring of this gunner.

He used the opportunity to tell the King of the discrimination that he and his people experienced.

I told [the King] when my people went into Vanderhoof, they were not allowed to go into restaurants, use public toilets, and had to come in the back door of a grocery store to buy groceries. We spoke for a long time about the injustice to my people. He told me he would endeavour to help my people.

— The Indian Voice, December 1980, Volume 12, Number 12

While in the Army, Patrick was treated as an equal, with little discrimination, but after his discharge in March 1946 he faced the same discrimination as before. In Vanderhoof, the town nearest to his village, Indians were refused service by many businesses and required to use separate entrances and facilities by others. Shortly after his return, he entered the Silver Grill Café, took a seat, and attempted to order a meal. When he was denied service, he refused to leave. For this he was arrested, charged with disturbing the peace, and sentenced to six months in prison. He served his time in Oakalla Prison, which was notorious for its brutal and inhumane conditions.

When he was released and returned to Vanderhoof, he immediately went back to the Silver Grill Café and again demanded service. He was again arrested and sent to prison. Over the course of a year he demanded to be served 11 times and was imprisoned 11 times. He spent 11 months of the year in prison.

Dick Patrick died in 1980 and was buried, with full military honors, in Saik'uz village.

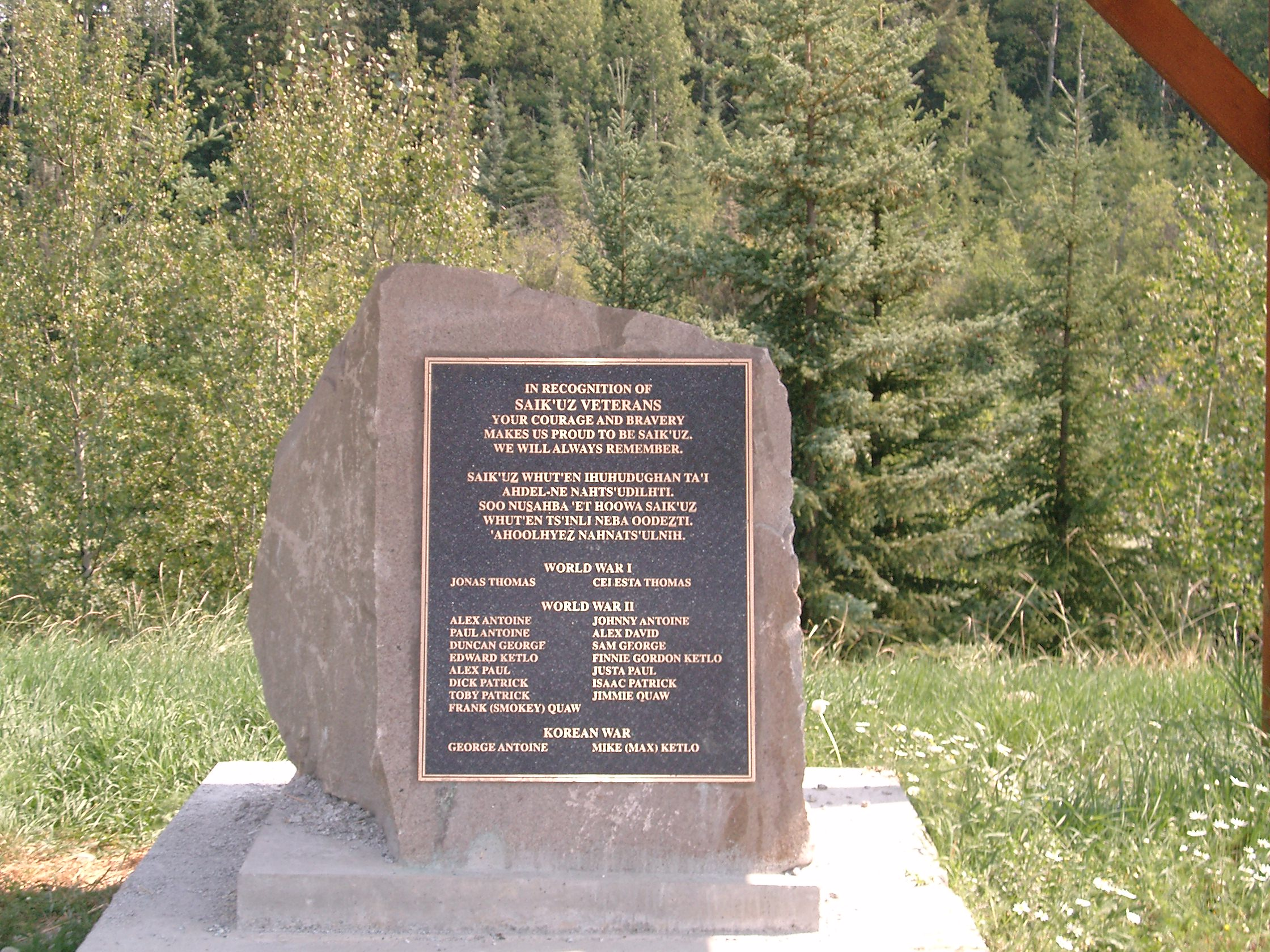
Saik'uz veterans memorial.
