= Fawnie Range =

Mountain range in British Columbia, Canada

Coordinates: 53°16′00″N 125°03′00″W

The Fawnie Range is a small hill-range located to the south of the Ootsa Lake reservoir and to the north of the West Road River in the Nechako Plateau region of the Central Interior of British Columbia, Canada. The northwest part of the park is within Entiako Provincial Park and includes Mount Swannell, (1821 m /5974 ft), one of the range's main summits, overlooking Natalkuz Lake (part of the Ootsa Reservoir) from the south. Other named summits include Tutial Mountain (1844 m / 6050 ft), Fawnie Dome (1733 m / 5686 ft) and Fawnie Nose (1933 m / 6342 ft), the highest summit in the range.

== See also ==
- Telegraph Range
- Quanchus Range
- List of landforms of British Columbia
