= Pinchie, British Columbia =

Coordinates: 54.567°N 124.510°W

Pinchie is the English name of the Carrier village of Binche on the northeast shore of Stuart Lake, outside of Fort Saint James in north central British Columbia. Formerly part of Tlʼaztʼen Nation, it became an independent band in 2019. As of September, 2023 it had 217 members. Its traditional language is Carrier.
