= Yinka Dene Language Institute =

The Yinka Dene Language Institute (YDLI) is an organization based in Stoney Creek, British Columbia, whose purpose is the study and maintenance of the language and culture of Dakelh and other First Nations people in northern British Columbia.

== History ==
It was founded in 1988 by the Carrier Sekani Tribal Council, the College of New Caledonia, School District 55 Burns Lake, School District 56 Nechako and School District 28 Quesnel. The late Mary John, Sr. was one of the founders of YDLI and was Permanent Honorary Chair until her death in 2004. Grand Chief Edward John was instrumental in the founding of YDLI and served as its first president.

The University of Northern British Columbia joined in 1995, and in 2000, School District 91 Nechako Lakes, formed by the merger of Districts 55 and 56, withdrew from the institute.

== Governance ==
YDLI is governed by a board of trustees of whom the Carrier Sekani Tribal Council appoints six, the Elders' Council three, and the other members two each. The current members are the Carrier Sekani Tribal Council, the College of New Caledonia, School District 28, and the University of Northern British Columbia.

== Activities ==
YDLI's activities include research, archiving, teacher training and production of educational and reference materials.
