= Nechako Country =

Historical provincial geographic region

The Nechako Country, also referred to as the Nechako District or simply "the Nechako" is one of the historical geographic regions of the Canadian province of British Columbia, located southwest of the city of Prince George and south of Hwy 16 on the inland side of the Hazelton Mountains (an inland subrange of the Coast Mountains), and comprising the basin of the Nechako River and its tributaries. "Nechako" is an anglicization of netʃa koh, its name in the indigenous Carrier language which means "big river".

The area is sparsely populated, mostly by members of the Carrier people, and is noted for its many large lakes, including Ootsa Lake Reservoir, which is the source of water for the Kemano Powerhouse on a neighbouring coastal inlet, which is the power supply for the aluminum smelter at Kitimat.

To the north of the Nechako Country are the Omineca Country and Bulkley Valley, while to its south is the Chilcotin Country and to the southeast the Cariboo Country.

== In media ==
Nechako Country: In the Footsteps of Bert Irvine is a memoir and regional history that documents the people, landscapes, and changing way of life of the region from the 1930s onward.

== See also ==
- Lejac
- Nechako Plateau
- Nechako River
