= Nazko First Nation =

First Nation government in British Columbia, Canada

- Band No. 720
- People: Dakelh
- Headquarters: Nazko
- Province: British Columbia

Land
- Main reserve: Nazco 20
- Reserves: List: Blackwater No. 1; Nahlquonate 2; Ulkah 3; Umliisle 4; Deep Creek 5; Trout Lake Jonny 15; Trout Lake Alec 16; Euchinico Creek 17, 18, 19; Nazco Cemetery 20A; Nazco 21; Michelle Creek 22, 23; Fishpot Lake 24; Lower Fishpot Lake 24A; Baezaeko River 25, 26, 27; Coglistiko River 29; Redwater Creek 30
- Land area: 19.73 km^{2} (7.62 sq mi)

Population (2025)
- On reserve: 114
- On other land: 15
- Off reserve: 309
- Total population: 438

Government
- Chief: Leah Stump
- Council: Delores Alec; Anthony Perry

Tribal Council
- Carrier Chilcotin Tribal Council

Website
- nazkoband.ca

Nazko First Nation is a First Nations government of the Dakelh people in the north-central Interior of British Columbia. Its reserves are located around the community of Nazko, British Columbia, which is 120 km west of Quesnel and southwest of Prince George.

Nazko/Ndazkoh is located on the Nazko River and ndazkoh means "river flowing from the south".

== Indian reserves ==
Indian Reserves under the administration of the Nazko First Nation are:

- Baezaeko River Indian Reserve No. 25, 3 miles (4.8 km) NW of Fishpot Lake, 64.70 ha. 52°59′00″N 123°48′00″W
- Baezaeko River Indian Reserve No. 26, on the Baezaeko River, 3 miles (4.8 km) NW of Fishpot Lake, 64.70 ha. 52°58′00″N 123°48′00″W
- Baezaeko River Indian Reserve No. 27, on the Baezaeko River adjoining IRs No. 25 and 26, 16.20 ha. 52°59′00″N 123°48′00″W
- Coglistiko River Indian Reserve No. 29, on a small unnamed lake 5 miles (8.0 km) NW of Fishpot Lake, 64.80 ha. 52°59′00″N 123°51′00″W
- Deep Creek Indian Reserve No. 5, 1/2 mile N of the West Road River, 1-mile (1.6 km) W of the mouth of Pantage Creek, 1.0 ha. 53°18′00″N 123°07′00″W
- Euchinico Creek Indian Reserve No. 17, on the West Road River, 2 miles (3.2 km) S of the mouth of Euchiniko Creek, 358.60 ha. 53°13′00″N 123°30′00″W
- Euchinico Creek Indian Reserve No. 18, 3 miles (4.8 km) S of the mouth of Euchiniko Creek, 129.50 ha. 53°12′00″N 123°32′00″W
- Euchinico Creek Indian Reserve No. 19, on a small creek, 2 miles (3.2 km) SW of Nuntzun (Cultus) Lake, 129.50 ha. 53°15′20″N 123°33′10″W
- Fishpot Lake Indian Reserve No. 24, on north shore of Fishpot Lake, 8 miles (13 km) W of Stump Lake, 2.0 ha. 52°57′00″N 123°46′00″W
- Lower Fishpot Lake Indian Reserve No. 24A, on a small unnamed lake 9 miles (14 km) W of Stump Lake, 52.40 ha. 52°58′00″N 123°48′00″W
- Michelle Creek Indian Reserve No. 22, at the headwaters of Michelle Creeik, 48.60 ha. 52°54′00″N 123°39′00″W
- Michelle Creek Indian Reserve No. 23, at the headwaters of Michelle Creek east of and adjoining IR No. 22, 64.70 ha. 52°54′00″N 123°39′00″W
- Nahlquonate Indian Reserve No. 2, on left (N) bank of the West Road River 12 miles (19 km) W of its mouth on the Fraser River, 87.80 ha. 53°18′00″N 123°11′00″W
- Nazco Indian Reserve No. 20, on the Nazko River at Stump Lake, 463.80 ha. 52°57′00″N 123°34′00″W
- Nazco Indian Reserve No. 21, on Michelle Creek 2 miles (3.2 km) west of Stump Lake, 48.50 ha. 52°56′00″N 123°38′00″W
- Nazco Cemetery Indian Reserve No. 20A, on the Nazko River, north of Stump Lake, north of and adjoining IR No. 20. 0.10 ha. 52°58′00″N 123°34′00″W
- Redwater Creek Indian Reserve No. 30, on two small lakes, 1 mile (1.6 km) SW of Redwater Lake, 64.70 ha. 53°01′00″N 123°47′00″W
- Trout Lake Alec Indian Reserve No. 16, on the West Road River, 5 miles (8.0 km) north of the mouth of the Nazko River, 125.0 ha. 53°11′00″N 123°32′00″W
- Trout Lake Johny Indian Reserve No. 15, 2 miles (3.2 km) S of Nutzun (Cultus) Lake, 64.80 ha. 53°14′00″N 123°34′00″W

== Politics ==
In 1973, the government of British Columbia unveiled plans to conduct extensive logging on the lands of Nazko and Kluskus First Nations. For over two years, Kluskus unsuccessfully sought an agreement on cooperative planning that would allow future generations of their peoples to benefit from the extraction of their natural resources. In March 1975, Kluskus and Nazko signed a joint declaration opposing further encroachment on their territories, the watersheds of the Nazko and Blackwater (Tiyakoh) Rivers west of the River to the Ulgatcho Mountains. When the provincial government continued to pursue logging plans, the people of the two first nations held public protests (led by Nazko Band manager Dennis Patrick and Kluskus Chief Roger Jimmie) in Quesnel in 1976.
