= Nazko River =

Location
- Country: Canada
- Province: British Columbia
- District: Cariboo Land District

Physical characteristics
- Source: Fraser Plateau
- Mouth: West Road River
  - location: Fraser Plateau
  - coordinates: 53°7′36″N 123°34′0″W
  - elevation: 800 m (2,600 ft)
- Discharge
  - location: above Michelle Creek
  - average: 4.90 m^{3}/s (173 cu ft/s)
  - minimum: 0.106 m^{3}/s (3.7 cu ft/s)
  - maximum: 88.0 m^{3}/s (3,110 cu ft/s)

Basin features
- Tributaries
  - left: Clisbako River
  - right: Snaking River

The Nazko River is a tributary of the West Road River, one of the main tributaries of the Fraser River, in the Canadian province of British Columbia. It flows through the Fraser Plateau region west of Quesnel.

The name "Nazko" comes from Ndazkoh (Ndaz – meaning ″from the south″ and koh – meaning ″River″) a Dakelh (Carrier) word meaning "river flowing from the south".

== Course ==
The Nazko River originates in a boggy area of many lakes on the Fraser Plateau, around 52°20′N 123°30′W. It flows generally north. Ross Creek joins just before the Nazko River flows through a series of lakes, including Nazko Lake, Tanilkul Lake, Nastachi Lake, Tzazati Lake, and Tchusiniltil Lake. The river also flows through Nazko Lake Provincial Park in this area. Goering Creek joins from the east, Anoko Creek from the west. The Nazko River turns to the east and Brown Creek joins from the north. Then the river plummets over Nazko Falls. Tautri Creek joins just before the Nazko resumes its northernly direction. As it flows north the river collects Wentworth Creek from the east and the Clisbako River from the southwest. The Nazko flows by Marmot Lake and Stump Lake as it enters the Nazko First Nation's Indian reserve and the community of Nazko.

North of the town of Nazko the river is joined by Redwater Creek from the west, then the Snaking River from the southeast. Shortly after that the Nazko reaches its confluence with the West Road River.

== History ==
The Nazko River is within of the tradition lands of the Chuntezni’i, Euchinico, and Lhoosk'uzt'en bands of the Dakelh people. Today the Nazko First Nation includes Indian Reserves around the community of Nazko, British Columbia.

== See also ==
- List of tributaries of the Fraser River
