= Keyoh =

Keyoh is a term in the Dakelh (Carrier) language meaning territory, village, or trapline. It refers to a traditional Indigenous land governance system practiced by the central and southern Carrier peoples in the interior of British Columbia, Canada.

== Definition and Structure ==
A Keyoh is the principal area over which a specific Indigenous corporate family group or band society holds customary rights. These rights include use, occupancy, stewardship, and ownership of the land. The governance system is patrilineal, meaning leadership and land responsibilities are passed down through the male line.

The hereditary chief of a Keyoh is known as the keyohwhuduchun, often translated as Keyoh Holder or noble. This role carries responsibilities for land stewardship and community leadership, within the Keyoh. One prominent historical Keyohwhuduchun was Chief Kwah, a respected figure in Carrier history.

== Distinction from Colonial Systems ==
Although trapline is sometimes used to translate Keyoh, this can be misleading. A Keyoh is not limited to trapping rights and is independent of the provincial trapline registration system introduced in 1925. That system assigns trapping rights to individuals, historically only men, whereas a Keyoh reflects collective family governance and broader territorial stewardship.

Keyohs also predate the Indian Act and its creation of Indian Bands, such as the Nak'azdli Band. Unlike Bands, which are statutory entities under Canadian law, Keyohs are rooted in customary law and Indigenous governance. They continue to function today, often alongside or in contrast to colonial systems.

The term Keyoh is also used in contemporary contexts to assert Indigenous rights and governance. For example, the Maiyoo Keyoh Society frames Keyoh as a basis for hereditary stewardship and territorial authority, independent of colonial systems such as the Indian Act and provincial trapline registration. This usage reflects ongoing efforts to have Keyoh governance recognized under Section 35 of the Constitution Act, 1982.

== Contemporary Usage ==
The term keyoh is used in various cultural and institutional contexts. For example, at the University of Northern British Columbia, one student residence is named keyoh, meaning “our community,” while another is called Neyoh, meaning “our home.” In western dialects of Dakelh, the word appears as Keyah.
