= Trembleur Lake Provincial Park =

Provincial park in British Columbia, Canada

- IUCN category II (national park)
- Location within British Columbia
- Interactive map of Trembleur Lake Provincial Park
- Location: British Columbia, Canada
- Nearest city: Fort. St James
- Coordinates: 54°49′47″N 125°14′05″W
- Governing body: BC Parks

Trembleur Lake Provincial Park is a provincial park in British Columbia, Canada.

Trembleur Lake Provincial Park is a part of the larger preserved area, known as the Stuart-Trembleur-Takla Lakes boating system, a waterway of nearly 300 kilometres. Trembleur Lake, after which the park is named, is a pristine lake nearly 50 kilometres in length. The lake and park offer a spectacular wilderness setting and recreational activities such as boating, hunting, and angling.
