= Tachie River =

Coordinates: 54°39′07″N 124°45′45″W

The Tachie River is a river in central British Columbia, Canada. It originates at Trembleur Lake and flows southeastward into Stuart Lake, which it enters at Tachie village. In the indigenous Carrier language it is called Duz̲dlikoh, which means "driftwood flows river".

== See also ==
- List of rivers of British Columbia
