= Takla Lake Marine Provincial Park =

Provincial park in British Columbia

Takla Lake Provincial Park
- IUCN category II (national park)
- Location within British Columbia
- Interactive map of Takla Lake Provincial Park
- Location: British Columbia, Canada
- Nearest city: Smithers
- Coordinates: 55°07′39″N 125°39′35″W
- Area: 5.5 km^{2} (2.1 sq mi)
- Established: March 8, 1990
- Governing body: BC Parks

Takla Lake Marine Provincial Park is a provincial park in British Columbia, Canada. Located northeast of the town of Smithers and roughly parallel to Babine Lake to its west/southwest, it comprises three sites on Takla Lake in the northwestern part of the Omineca Country of the province's North-Central Interior. The three sites are the Sandy Point Site, containing about 160 ha (400 acres), Takla Lake West containing about 41 ha (100 acres), and White Bluff, containing about 349 ha (860 acres).
