= Bridget Moran =

Canadian writer and activist (1923–1999)

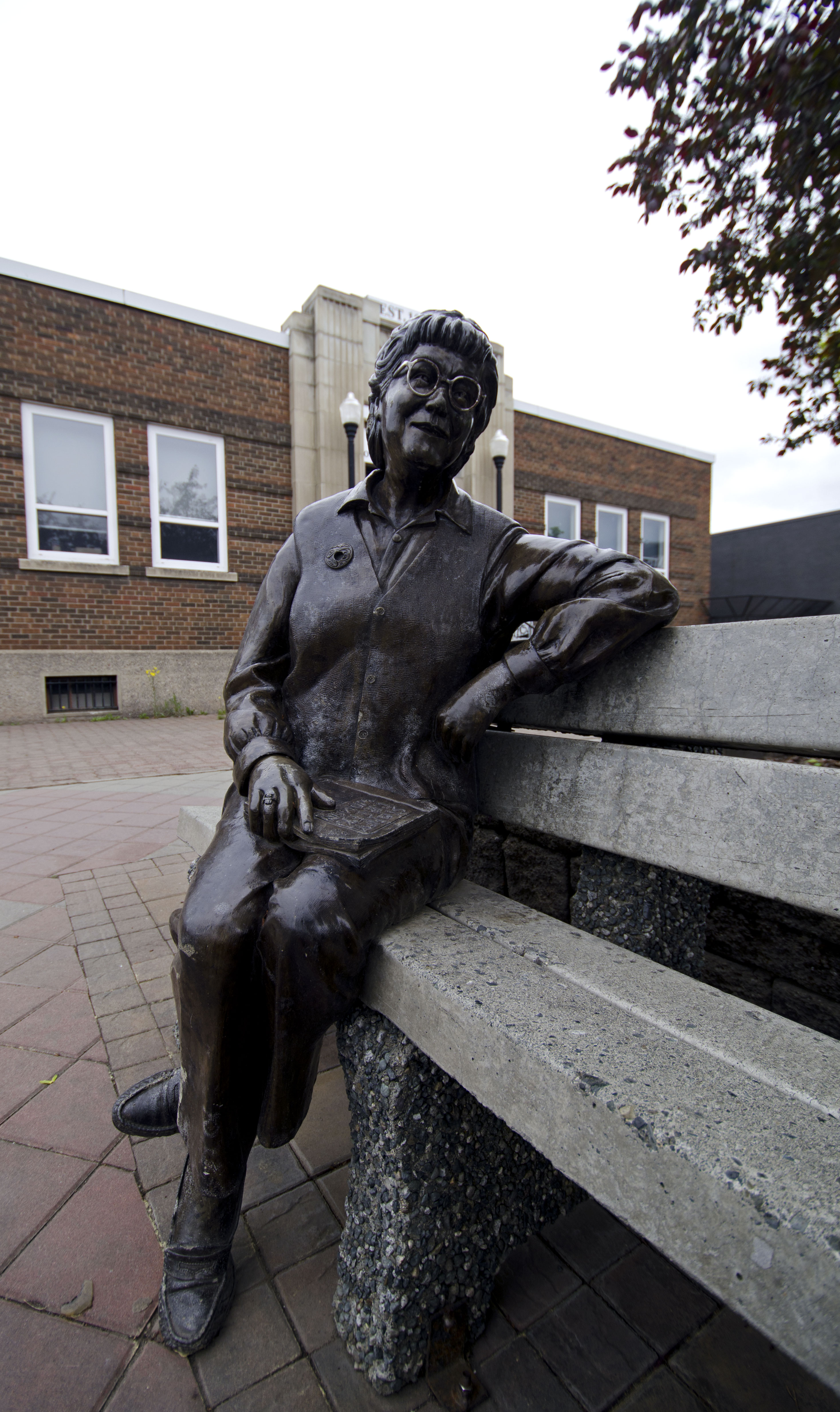
Statue of Bridget Moran in Prince George, British Columbia, Carved by Nathan Scott

Bridget Moran (September 1, 1923 – August 21, 1999), née Drugan, was a Canadian social activist and author in British Columbia. Born in Enniskillen, County Fermanagh, Northern Ireland, shortly after her birth her family emigrated to Success, Saskatchewan, where she grew up.

== Biography ==
After attending Normal School, she taught school in rural Saskatchewan until 1944 when she enlisted in the Women's Royal Canadian Naval Service. Discharged from the Navy in 1946, she received a B.A. in Philosophy and English with Honours, graduating as a gold medalist from the University of Toronto. She began work on a master's degree in History, but was unable to continue because the Department of Veterans' Affairs refused to provide financial support on the grounds that they found no women teaching in history departments in Canada.

As a result, she immigrated to British Columbia and began a career as a social worker in Prince George in November 1951, going on to work in both Salmon Arm and Vernon. In 1954, she took the position of District Supervisor of Welfare Services, based in Prince George. She was responsible for a significant portion of BC's Central Interior and worked in Prince George for 10 years.

In 1964 the provincial government suspended her, along with four other social workers, for their public criticisms of child welfare services, including an open letter to Premier W.A.C. Bennett (Social Credit party) She ultimately won reinstatement but was not able to find further work in the provincial Ministry of Social Services. Thereafter, she worked as a social worker for the Prince George Regional Hospital, the University of Victoria Social Work Department, and, from 1977 until 1989, the Prince George school district.

Around the time of her retirement from the Prince George School District, she began to write. She became interested in the inquest into the death of Coreen Thomas, a Carrier Indian woman. At the inquest she met Mary John, Sr. In 1988, Mary John's daughter Helen Jones, asked her to write her mother's biography. Mary John told her the story of her life on the Stoney Creek reserve, resulting in the award-winning book Sai'k'uz Ts'eke: Stoney Creek Woman. This was the beginning of her writing career. In addition to Sai'k'uz Ts'eke: Stoney Creek Woman, she wrote Judgment at Stoney Creek: Sai'k'uz Ne ba na huz'ya,, about the death of Coreen Thomas. This second book also offered an analysis of Aboriginal/non-Aboriginal relations in rural BC (1970s). She wrote A Little Rebellion, about her work with the Ministry of Social Services, including her dispute with the Bennett government, and Justa: A First Nations Leader, Dakelhne Butsowhudilhzulh'un, a biography of Carrier Indian leader Justa Monk.

Moran was married for many years to Pat Moran whom she married in 1955 and with him had four children. Her daughter Mayo Moran is a legal scholar. In her later years, Moran served on the boards of the College of New Caledonia, the Legal Services Society of British Columbia, and the Yinka Dene Language Institute.

Moran was also commissioned by the Elizabeth Fry Society Elizabeth Fry Society to profile the case of a battered woman named "Theresa", in the book Don't Bring Me Flowers (1992).

In her later years, Moran served on the boards of the College of New Caledonia (CNC), the Legal Services Society of British Columbia, and the Yinka Dene Language Institute. She received many honours for her writing, including the Lieutenant Governor's Medal for Historical Writing from the British Columbia Historical Federation and the Jeanne Clark Memorial Award for Local History. She was an honorary member of the Canadian Research Institute for the Advancement of Women. She received honorary Doctor of Laws degrees from the University of Northern British Columbia (1995) and the University of Victoria (1996).

Her last book, entitled Prince George Remembered from Bridget Moran (1996), highlights oral histories of white settler memories of arrivals to Prince George between 1911 and 1920. She originally documented these in the 1950s.

Moran died in 1999 and is remembered for having consistently fought on behalf of the weak and underprivileged. At her memorial service in Prince George, the concluding hymn was Solidarity Forever.

In 2003, the City of Prince George commissioned a statue of her by sculptor Nathan Scott and erected it at the intersection of Third Avenue and Québec Street. Her memory lives on in many aspects of Prince George life, including an award named after her, and a tradition of dressing her statue up seasonally. For example, the Prince George Celtic Club has been known to dress her up for St. Patrick's Day and street people frequently wrap her in warm scarves and toques on cold winter days.

== Works ==
- Stoney Creek Woman: The Story of Mary John. Vancouver: Arsenal Pulp Press. 1988. ISBN 978-1-55152-047-6.
- Judgment at Stoney Creek. Vancouver: Arsenal Pulp Press. 1990. ISBN 978-1-55152-053-7.
- A Little Rebellion. Vancouver: Arsenal Pulp Press. 1992. ISBN 978-0-88978-252-5.
- Justa: A First Nations Leader. Vancouver: Arsenal Pulp Press. 1994. ISBN 1-55152-014-1.
- Prince George Remembered. Prince George, British Columbia: Moran Publishing. 1996.
