= Mount Blanchet Provincial Park =

Provincial park in British Columbia, Canada

- IUCN category II (national park)
- Location within British Columbia
- Interactive map of Mount Blanchet Provincial Park
- Location: British Columbia, Canada
- Nearest city: Smithers
- Coordinates: 55°17′29″N 125°53′00″W
- Area: 247.74 km^{2} (95.65 sq mi)
- Established: January 25, 2001
- Governing body: BC Parks

Mount Blanchet Provincial Park is a provincial park in British Columbia, Canada, located on the west side of the southern end of Takla Lake, north of Smithers.
