= Nazko Lake Provincial Park =

Provincial park in British Columbia, Canada

Nazco Lake Provincial Park
- IUCN category II (national park)
- Location within British Columbia
- Interactive map of Nazco Lake Provincial Park
- Location: British Columbia, Canada
- Nearest city: Quesnel
- Coordinates: 52°27′44″N 123°31′59″W
- Area: 78.54 km^{2} (30.32 sq mi)
- Established: July 13, 1995
- Governing body: BC Parks

Nazko Lake Provincial Park is a provincial park in British Columbia, Canada. It is located at Nazko Lake on the Nazko River.
