= Band government =

First Nations government in Canada

A band (French: bande; also known as a First Nation) (Note: While band is the official term for the administrative unit, many Bands now prefer the term First Nation. This is distinct from the use of the term First Nation to refer to a larger Indigenous group, with a shared culture and language, which may comprise several bands.) is an administrative entity and basic unit of government for First Nations in Canada, created by the Indian Act of 1876. (Note: Non-status Indians, Métis, and Inuit are not part of the system of band governments and reserves.) It includes members of a First Nation group "for whom lands have been set apart, and for whom money is held by the Crown". As of 2024, there were 619 bands in Canada, representing over 50 First Nation groups.

Bands function as local governments, managing infrastructure on their reserves, education, and social services. Each band is typically governed by an elected band council (French: conseil de bande) chaired by an elected chief, and sometimes also a hereditary chief. Membership is determined either through the Indian Register maintained by Indigenous Services Canada, or by the individual bands. Many First Nations also have large off-reserve populations whom the band government also represents; it may also deal with non-members who live on reserve or work for the band.

Bands can be united into larger regional groupings such as tribal councils, treaty councils or associations, chiefs' councils, provincial councils or similar organization, and national organizations like the Assembly of First Nations.

== History ==
The term band is historically related to the anthropological term band society, but as a legal and administrative unit the band need not correspond to a band in this sense. Some bands draw their members from two or more ethnic groups due to the disruption of traditional ways by colonization and/or the administrative convenience of Canada, or by consensual alliances between such groups, some pre-dating the Indian Act.

First Nations were first organized into bands by the Gradual Enfranchisement Act of 1867. The act replaced traditional governments with municipal-style band governments, which were given minor governing powers, while the federal government controlled the reserves. Band councils were introduced to undermine traditional forms of government, as a part of the government policy of assimilation.

== Band ==
In Canada, the elected government of a First Nations band consists of a chief and councillors. Many bands, especially in British Columbia, control multiple Indian reserves, that is, multiple parcels of land. Although bands have considerable control over their reserve land, legally neither the band itself nor its members hold aboriginal land title. Rather, the land is held in trust for the band by the Crown.

== Band councils and elections ==
The functioning of a band is controlled by the Indian Act, the legislation that defines the position of status Indians. The band government is controlled by a chief councillor and council. The number of councillors is determined by the number of band members, with a minimum of two in addition to the chief councillor. The Indian Act specifies procedures for the election of the chief councillor and council. Some bands make use of a policy provision (called 'custom election', which allows them to exempt themselves from these requirements in order to follow traditional procedures for the choice of leaders. This is a matter of controversy. Proponents argue that it allows First Nations to adapt the externally defined system to their traditions. Sometimes this means that 'hereditary' leaders become the chief councillor. Opponents argue that custom systems are frequently not traditional and that, traditional or not, they are unfair and undemocratic and have the effect of preserving the power of corrupt cliques. In many cases they exclude women and also exclude hereditary leaders. The term "Chief" refers to a chief councillor: this individual is not necessarily a hereditary chief or leader, though some are.

Although the current policy of the Crown–Indigenous Relations and Northern Affairs Canada (CIRNAC) is to treat band governments as largely autonomous, under the Indian Act band council resolutions have no effect unless endorsed by the Minister of Crown–Indigenous Relations.

In addition to the chief and council system mandated by the Indian Act, some bands have a traditional system of government that retains considerable influence. In some cases the two systems have come to an accommodation, such as the Office of the Hereditary Chiefs of the Wet'suwet'en. In other cases the two are in conflict.

== Tribal councils ==
Two or more bands may unite to form a tribal council. Tribal councils have no independent status; they draw their powers entirely from their member bands. What powers are delegated to the tribal council and which services are provided centrally by the tribal council varies according to the wishes of the member bands.

=== Other organizations ===
In addition to tribal councils, bands may create joint organizations for particular purposes, such as providing social services or health care. For example, in the central interior of British Columbia, Carrier Sekani Family Services provides social services for a dozen bands. CSFS was originally a part of the Carrier Sekani Tribal Council but is now a separate organization. Its members include bands that are not members of CSTC.

During treaty negotiations, such as those attempted by the BC provincial government in the form of the British Columbia Treaty Process, bands claims are coordinated and negotiated, if negotiated, by treaty councils. The composition of these may correspond to the local tribal council, such as the Ktunaxa Kinbasket Tribal Council vs the Ktunaxa Kinbasket Treaty Council. But in that particular case American tribal governments belong to the former tribal council but not to the treaty council. Others, such as the Maa-nulth Treaty Association or the Temexw Treaty Group, span different tribal councils and individual bands, covering more than one ethnic group. Another organization called a chiefs council may include bands that belong to one or more tribal councils and also individual bands that belong to none. For instance, the St'át'timc Chiefs Council serves as a common voice for all Stʼatʼimc and formally does not acknowledge Crown sovereignty.

In other provinces, where treaties already exist, a treaty group or treaty association is composed of bands already signatory to existing treaties, such as Treaty 6 and Treaty 8.

In addition to tribal councils and special-purpose service organizations, bands may form larger organizations. The largest is the Assembly of First Nations, which represents the chiefs of over 600 bands throughout Canada. There are also some regional organizations. The Chief of the AFN is referred to as the National Chief. The AFN also has a Vice-Chief for each region.

In British Columbia, the First Nations Summit represents 203 bands in the province that are engaged in treaty negotiations with Canada and British Columbia. An older organization, the Union of British Columbia Indian Chiefs, represents the bands that reject the current British Columbia Treaty Process. Some bands belong to both. In Ontario, the Chiefs of Ontario serve as the provincial-level organization; in Saskatchewan, the provincial-level grouping is the Federation of Sovereign Indigenous Nations.

== See also ==
- First Nations in Canada
- Classification of Indigenous peoples of the Americas
- List of First Nations band governments
- List of Indian reserves in Canada
