= Rose Prince =

Canadian subject of pilgrimage

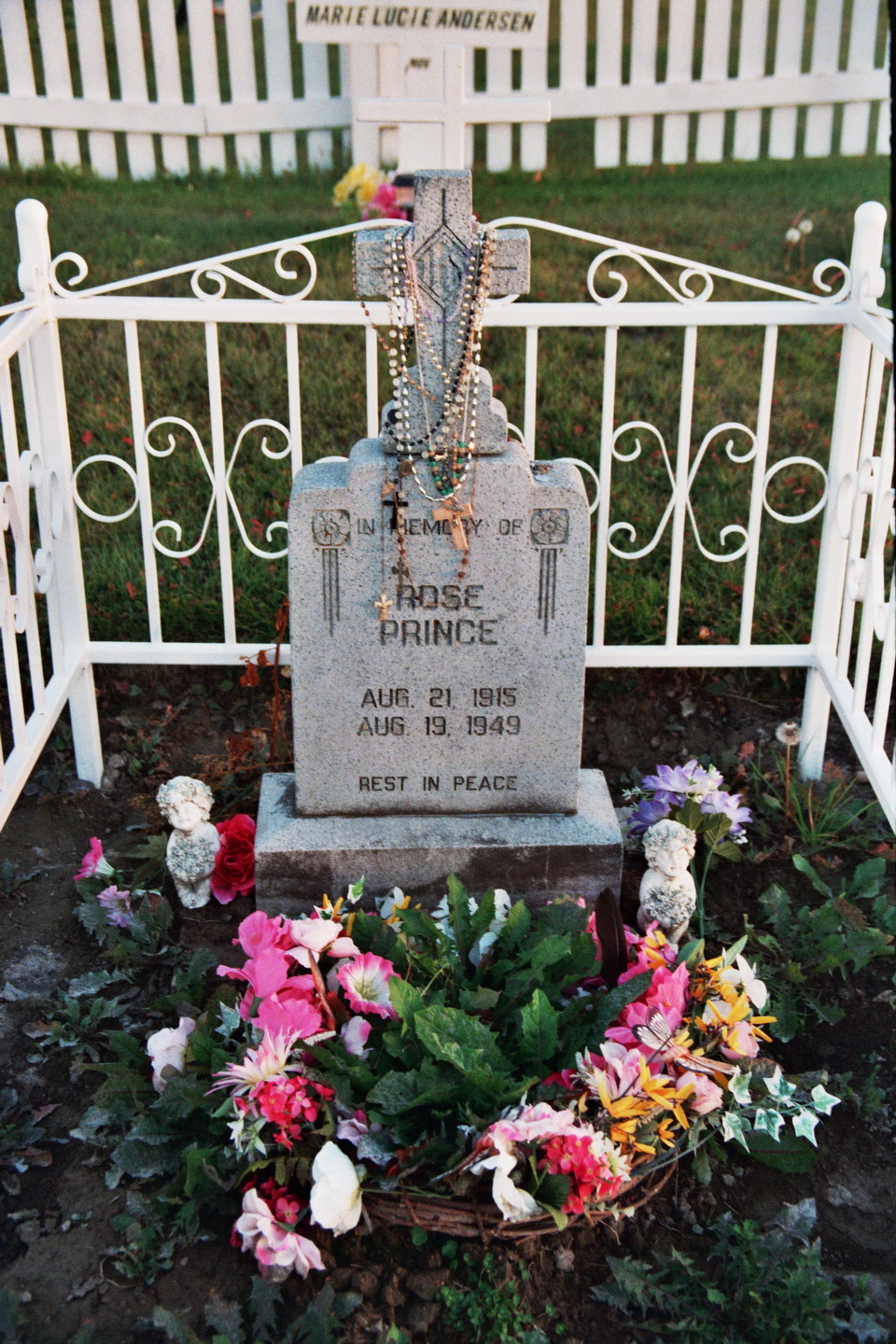
The grave of Rose Prince, at the former site of Lejac Residential School on Fraser Lake

Rose Prince (or Rose of the Carrier) was a Dakelh woman who has become the subject of a Catholic pilgrimage.

== Biography ==
Rose Prince was born in Fort St. James, British Columbia, in 1915, the third of the nine children of Jean-Marie and Agathe Prince. Jean-Marie was descended from the great chief Kwah. He met his wife Agathe at the residential school that was part of Saint Joseph's Mission in Williams Lake, British Columbia.They were married at the school.

When the Lejac Residential School was built in 1922 Rose was sent there with some of her siblings and other children from her school, as part of the Canadian residential school system. When Prince was 16, still attending school at Lejac, her mother and two youngest sisters died from an influenza outbreak. Devastated, she opted not to return home for the summers, but to stay on at the school instead. After graduation, she stayed on at the school, tutoring children who needed help with their schoolwork, completing chores such as mending and sewing, painting and embroidering. She also worked as a secretary to the director.

At some point, Prince contracted tuberculosis, and by the age of 33 she was confined to bed. On August 19, 1949, two days before she turned 34 she was admitted to the hospital and died the same day.

== Pilgrimage ==
In 1951, two years after her death, her body was reportedly found incorrupt.

Decades later, Father Joules Goulet called for a pilgrimage to Lejac. Although only 20 people gathered in its first year in 1990, awareness has grown dramatically through passing years. In 1995, 1200 people made the trip to Lejac, coming from the region and even other provinces. Father Goulet's prayers and anointments at the site have even been claimed to heal the chronically injured.
