= Middle River, British Columbia =

Middle River
- Location of Middle River in British Columbia
- Coordinates: 54°52′00″N 125°07′00″W
- Country: Canada
- Province: British Columbia
- Time zone: UTC−07:00 (Pacific Time)
- Area codes: 250, 778

Middle River, formerly Middle River Village, is an unincorporated settlement at the mouth of the Middle River at its mouth into Trembleur Lake in Omineca Country of the Central Interior of British Columbia, Canada. The community includes Dzitline Lee Indian Reserve 9, which is located on the left bank of the mouth of the Middle River.
