= Saikʼuz First Nation =

- Band No. 615
- Stoney Creek
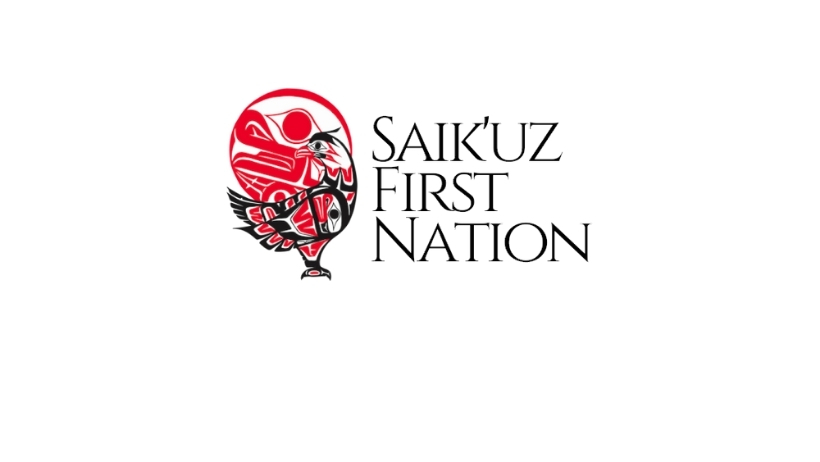
- People: Dakelh
- Headquarters: 135 Joseph St, Vanderhoof, BC V0J 3A1
- Province: British Columbia

Land
- Main reserve: Stoney Creek 1
- Reserves: Poison Bay 2; Laketown 3; Old Country Meadow 4; Clustalach 5; Noonla 6; Tatuk Lake 7; Sinkut Lake 8; Corkscrew Creek E. 9; Corkscrew Creek W. 10
- Land area: 32.35 km^{2} (12.49 sq mi)

Population
- On reserve: 346
- Off reserve: 637
- Total population: 983

Government
- Chief: Priscilla Mueller
- Council: Alison Johnny; Jasmine Thomas; Jason Alexis; Rodney Teed

Tribal Council
- Carrier-Sekani Tribal Council

Website
- http://www.saikuz.ca/

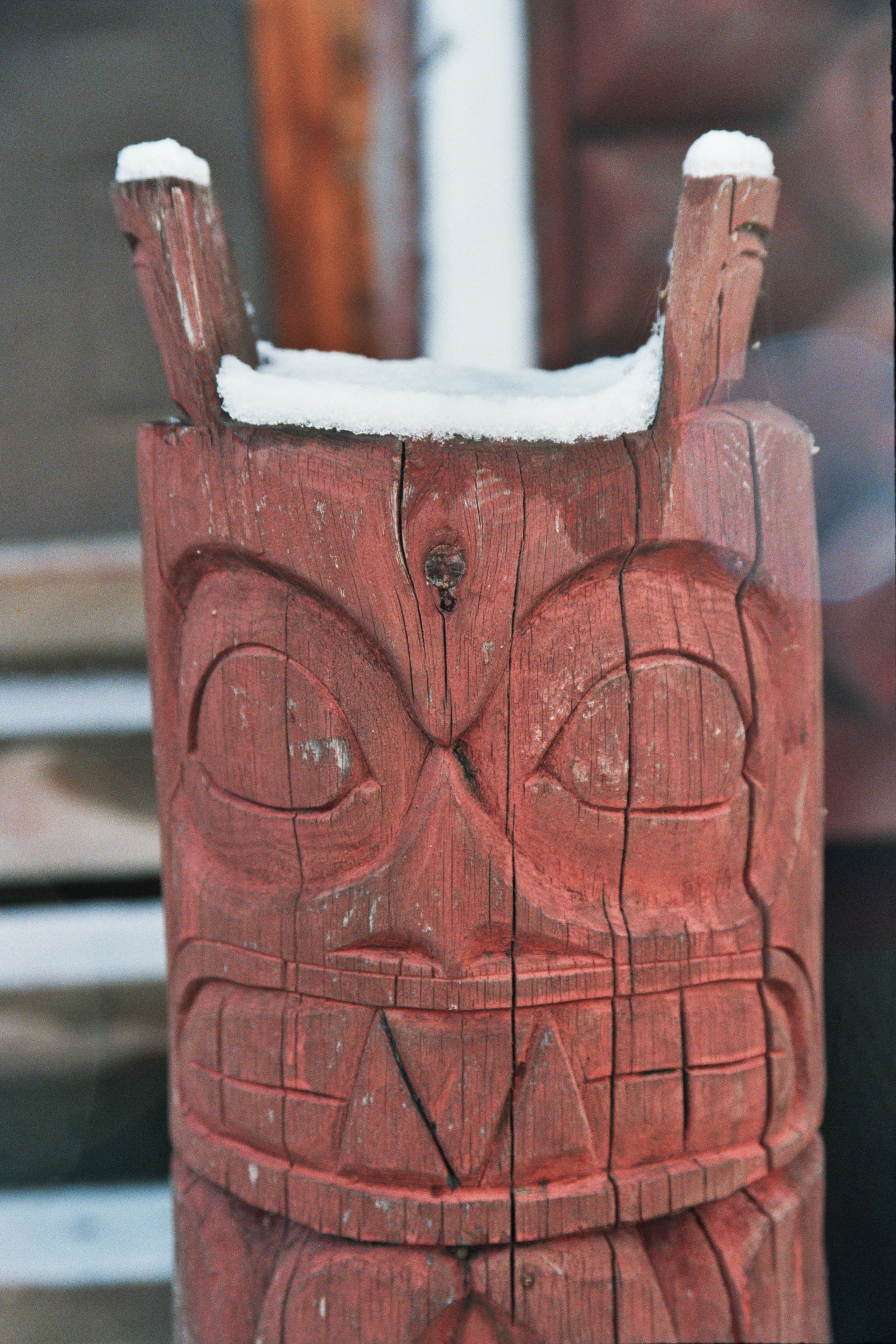
A small totem outside the Saikʼuz Potlatch House

Saikʼuz, translated as "on the sand", formerly known as Stoney Creek, is a Dakelh nation whose main community is on a reserve 9 km (6 mi) southwest of Vanderhoof, British Columbia along Kenney Dam Road. Saikʼuz is a member of the Carrier Sekani Tribal Council.

== Amenities ==
The Saikʼuz First Nation has a number of amenities, including a Band Administration Office where the Chief and Council make decisions on issues like housing, education, and forestry. The new band office is located in the new subdivision, which was previously an elementary school. Beside the band office is a daycare. The multiplex community hall is a building for traditional native dancing and annual general meetings (which all members of the community may attend). It is also used for extra-curricular activities like volleyball, basketball, floor hockey, and other social gatherings. Saikʼuz First Nation is also home to a local health station, which provides the community with drug and alcohol counseling, parenting programs, and a community kitchen. The reserve also has a volunteer fire hall in case of emergencies, and a convenience store called G&F market. It has a gas bar (Which is closed for the time being) It sold canned goods, pizza, snack foods, and fresh milk as well as locally produced native crafts. There are three water pumps located in various parts of the reserve where community members found water before electricity. Today, water is stored in a Green water tower on the reserve. The reserve also honours its veterans with a memorial park to commemorate their service in the two world wars and the Korean War. Saikʼuz also has a baseball field and holds many tournaments and is home to the "RD boys" and "the Tigers".

== Prominent members ==
There are currently 21 elders living on reserve. One of the nation's most famous elders was Mary John, Sr., whose 1989 memoir "Stoney Creek Woman" won the Lieutenant Governor's Medal for Historical Writing. She was also a recipient of the Order of Canada.

Another well-known elder was Sophie Thomas, known for her expertise in herbal medicine.

The late Celena John was also a prominent leader among the Carrier Sekani people.

Dick Patrick was a war hero who became well known for his refusal to accept discrimination on his return from his military service.

== Economy ==
The two largest sources of employment are the forest products industry and the band government. As in many First Nations communities, the unemployment rate is high. The band also operates several businesses.

The Saikʼuz potlatch house was built by the Stoney Creek Elders' Society on the shore of Nulki Lake. The potlatch house is a large log building that can hold 200–250 people, big enough for weddings, dances, meetings, and education courses. It serves important ceremonial purposes including governance, economy, social status, and other spiritual practices. Upstairs are the main hall, a kitchen, and two washrooms. Downstairs are a larger kitchen and several offices.

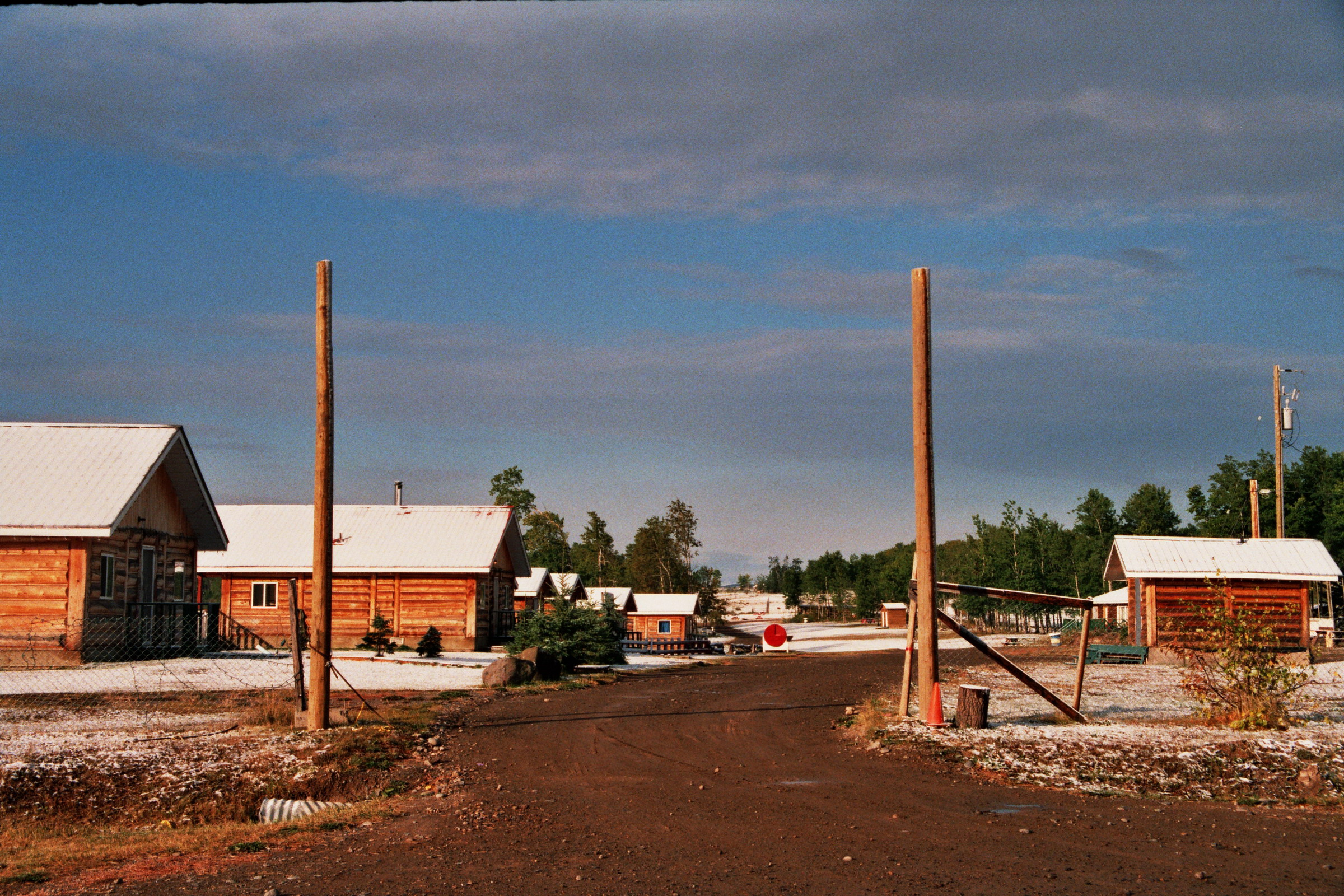
Cabins along Nulki lake, near the Potlatch House

Adjacent to the Potlatch House are eight cabins, a shower house, a boat launch, a smoke shack and a workshop. Six year-round staff members keep the campground and Potlatch House running smoothly.

Bingo is held at the Potlatch House every Wednesday. It was started in the late 1980s by two women from the Saikʼuz reserve. Past jackpots have included a truck and cash prizes up to $20,000. Other sources of revenue are the campgrounds and boat launch, which hold an annual fishing derby on May Long Weekend. In 2006, the 16th annual derby offered the highest prize to date, $5000. Other prizes are donated by various business in Vanderhoof and surrounding areas.

== Bibliography ==
- Moran, Bridget and Mary John, Sr. (1988)Stoney Creek Woman. Vancouver: Tillacum Library.
- Moran, Bridget (1990) Judgement at Stoney Creek. Vancouver: Tillacum Library.
- Poser, William J. (2021). Saikʼuz Whutʼen Hubughunek (Stoney Creek Carrier Dictionary). Stony Creek, British Columbia: Saikʼuz First Nation. seventh edition.
- Young, Jane and Alex Hawley (2002)Plants and Medicines of Sophie Thomas: Based on the Traditional Knowledge of Sophie Thomas, Sai'kuz Elder and Healer. © Sophie Thomas.
