= Lejac Residential School =

Catholic school in British Columbia, Canada

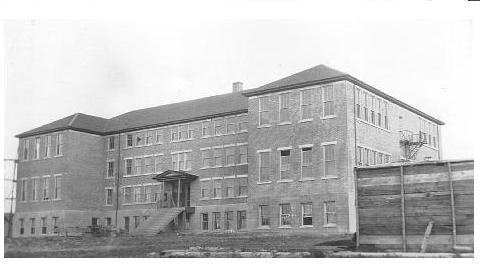
Lejac Residential School at Fraser Lake 1920s

Lejac Residential School was a Canadian residential school in British Columbia that operated from 1922 to 1976 by the Roman Catholic Church under contract with the Government of Canada.

Construction of the school was completed on 17 January 1922, succeeding the school that opened in 1917 in Fort Saint James. Lejac Residential School was located in an otherwise undeveloped area on the shore of the Fraser Lake just east of Fraser Lake, just off the railway line. This location was about 10 km (6.2 mi) from the First Nation village of Stellako at the west end of the lake (within Stellat'en First Nation territory) and the village of Nadleh at the east end of the lake (on Nadleh Whut'en First Nation territory). Although there were a few lay employees, most of the staff belonged to the Catholic Church, the men to the Oblates of Mary Immaculate, the women Sisters of the Child Jesus. The school was named after Father Jean-Marie Lejacq, an Oblate missionary who co-founded the mission at Fort Saint James in 1873.

Due to its location at the centre of Carrier country, the majority of students were Carrier; however, Lejac also enrolled substantial numbers of students from neighbouring tribes, including the Sekani and Gitksan.

As with most other residential schools, former students have charged that they were physically and sexually abused. In 2003, the RCMP charged a former dormitory supervisor with 10 counts of indecent assault, three of gross indecency, two of buggery, and six counts of common assault, for incidents that allegedly took place at the Lejac School and at the Cariboo-St. Joseph's Indian Residential School near Williams Lake, BC, between 1965 and 1973.

After the school closed in 1976 the land was transferred to the Nadleh Indian Band and the school buildings razed. What remains at the site are the cemetery and a memorial, the site of an annual pilgrimage in honor of Rose Prince, a Carrier girl who remained to live and work at the school whom some consider a candidate for sainthood.

== Death of students ==
As in many Canadian Indian Residential Schools (IRS), some children died while under the care of the school staff and administration. In one particularly tragic incident at the Lejac Residential School, four boys ran away on New Year's Day in 1937 and were found dead, frozen on a lake shortly thereafter. Allen Willie (age 8), Andrew Paul (age 9), Maurice Justin (age 8), and Johnny Michael (age 9) had fled the school "without caps and lightly clad" and had covered six of the seven miles to Nadleh reserve before succumbing to the cold.

== Bibliography ==
- Coccola, Father Nicolas (1988) They Call Me Father: Memoirs of Father Nicola Coccola. Vancouver: University of British Columbia Press. Edited by Margaret Whitehead.
- Fiske, Jo-Anne (1981) "And Then We Prayed Again": Carrier Women, Colonization, and Mission Schools. MA. Thesis, University of British Columbia.
- John, Mary and Bridget Moran. (1989) Stoney Creek Woman: The Story of Mary John. Arsenal Pulp Press. ISBN 1-55152-047-8.
- Yinka Dene Language Institute (1989) We Remember Lejac. Videotape. Vanderhoof, British Columbia: Yinka Dene Language Institute.

== Etc. ==
Marcel Gagnon Indigenous musician pays tribute to the story of deceased boys on his CBC album, New Years Day

== See also ==
- List of Canadian residential schools
