= Carrier Sekani Family Services =

Indigenous Services Organization

Carrier Sekani Family Services (CSFS) is an indigenous-led organization in British Columbia, Canada providing health, child welfare and other services to member nations of the Carrier Sekani Tribal Council, plus some other nations that speak the Carrier or Sekani languages, mostly in north central British Columbia. In 2020 they celebrated 30 years of work reasserting First Nations control of justice, health, social and family services.

== Services provided ==
CSFS provides a broad range of health and social services including covid vaccines, child welfare, employability and life skills training, a soup bus, prenatal and postnatal support, etc. They have nurses and doctors. They have contact locations in Prince George, Vanderhoof, Burns Lake, West Vancouver and Fort Saint James. Their daycare in the Burns Lake area is open to indigenous and non-indigenous children. They have over 180 programs, with for example 350 staff in child welfare and child health services. They helped pioneer telehealth in British Columbia and the rest of Canada, according to Warner Adam, CEO of CSFS. They also provide some legal services and do research.

== Nowh Guna training program ==
CSFS started the Nowh Guna “Our Way” Foot in Both Worlds Carrier Agility Training program in north central British Columbia. It involves facilitators and knowledge holders who are both indigenous and non-indigenous, and is led by Elders and Knowledge Keepers. Participants typically are a mixture of indigenous and non-indigenous from a variety of walks of life. The sessions involve stories, emotions and straightening out of inaccurate assumptions.

== Healing centre in northern British Columbia ==
A new healing centre is being built by CSFS and their partners near Tachick Lake, near Vanderhoof. It's expected to cost $40 million and open its doors in spring 2025. It will have a ten-bed detox treatment and 36-bed residential treatment. It will feature land-based healing. It's an indigenous-led project and the first detox treatment in northern B.C. A ground-breaking ceremony was held on June 12, 2023, marking the beginning of the project. "The Healing Centre will provide health and treatment based on sound practices including cultural, spiritual, social and science-based medical treatments", states Warner Adam.

== Awards ==
CSFS won the 2021 BC Reconciliation Award given by the Lieutenant Governor of British Columbia. In 2022, CSFS won two child welfare awards from the American National Indian Child Welfare Association; one for “exemplary service to Native children and families” and one for “significant contributions to the well-being of Indigenous children, families and communities in the United States or Canada”.
