= Telegraph Range =

Mountain range in British Columbia, Canada

Coordinates: 53°23′00″N 123°29′00″W

The Telegraph Range is a small hill-range located on the Nechako Plateau to the south of Ootsa Lake in the Cariboo Land District of the Central Interior of British Columbia, Canada. It was named by George M. Dawson to commemorate the route of the Collins Overland Telegraph, which lay along the range's northeast flank. The range is approximately 750 km^{2} in area.
