= Nechako Plateau =

Geographic feature in British Columbia, Canada

- Plateau
- Location within British Columbia
- Coordinates: 54°00′00″N 126°00′00″W
- Location: British Columbia, Canada
- Part of: Interior Plateau
- Geology: Flood basalt

The Nechako Plateau is the northernmost subdivision of the Interior Plateau, one of the main geographic regions of the Canadian province of British Columbia. It spans the basin of the Nechako River and its tributaries the Stuart River and Endako Rivers, and is bounded on the south by the West Road River (Blackwater River), south of which is the Chilcotin Plateau and on the north by the Nation River and the valleys of Babine and Takla Lakes, beyond which are the Omineca Mountains (N) and Skeena Mountains (NW). To the west, it abuts the various ranges of the Hazelton Mountains while on its east it is bounded by the pass between Prince George, British Columbia and the Parsnip Arm of Williston Lake, beyond which is the McGregor Plateau, which skirts the Northern Rockies. Some classification systems include the plateau area on the east bank of the Fraser River beyond the city of Prince George; this area neighbours the northernmost reaches of the Quesnel Highland and Cariboo Mountains.

"Nechako" is an anglicization of netʃa koh, its name in the indigenous Carrier language which means "big river".

== Sub-ranges ==
The Nechako Plateau has four official subranges:

- Fawnie Range
- Nechako Range
- Quanchus Range
- Telegraph Range

The Fawnie, Nechako and Telegraph Ranges are low ranges of hills, but the Quanchus Range is a very mountainous near-island within the arms of the Nechako Reservoir (formerly a chain of lakes). Much of this area of the plateau is in Tweedsmuir North Provincial Park and Protected Area.

== Geology ==
The Nechako Plateau was created by lava flowing over older volcanic and sedimentary rock. Large ice sheets then carved the bedrock into rolling hills.

The Nechako Canyon, also called the Grand Canyon of the Nechako, is now in a provincial protected area due to its striking landscape, formed by the course of the Nechako River carving into the plateau's lava and lined with pinnacles and overhanging cliff. It begins at the outlet of the Nechako Reservoir at Kenny Dam and ends at Cheslatta Falls, an 18m drop which is the last leg of the Cheslatta River.

== Climate and ecology ==
The area is populated with white spruce, subalpine fir, and (at higher elevations) Engelmann spruce trees. The plateau is protected from the Pacific weather systems by the Coast Mountains and Hazelton Mountains, resulting in dry, warm summers and dry, cold winters.
