= First Nations Summit =

The First Nations Summit is a First Nations political organization in British Columbia founded in 1992 after the formation of the British Columbia Treaty Commission and the British Columbia Treaty Process. It represents the interests of First Nation band governments involved in the treaty process. In 2007, these constituted 111 of the 194 of the bands in British Columbia but represent over 60% of the First Nations population. By 2023 this had expanded to "approximately 150" First Nations.

The executive of the First National Summit organization, together with the executives of the BC section of the Assembly of First Nations and the Union of BC Indian Chiefs, forms the First Nations Leadership Council of BC.

== See also ==
- British Columbia Treaty Process
