= School District 28 Quesnel =

School district in central British Columbia, Canada

- School District 28 Quesnel Logo

Location
- Quesnel Quesnel, Wells in Northeast British Columbia; Canada

District information
- Superintendent: Mr Dan Lowndes
- Schools: 16

Students and staff
- Students: Approx 3000

Other information
- Website: www.sd28.bc.ca

School District 28 Quesnel is a school district in central British Columbia. Most schools are located in Quesnel with one outlying school in Wells, a small community near the historic gold mining town of Barkerville and another school in the community of Nazko which is 100 km west of Quesnel.

== History ==
There are no working schools in Barkerville BC, nor have there been since the 1930s. The school is located in the town of Wells, BC. Wells is 8 km away from Barkerville and is also a historic mining town – although not a ghost town as Barkerville had become. Barkerville is a historic park, reminiscent from the time of the Gold Rush, and has a school house that puts on "classes" in the visitor season, which is June–September. The classes are not official but merely a dramatization of what the school house might have been in the time of the Gold Rush.

Quesnel "Gold Pan City" is now the largest of the three cities and the home of the school district's head office and most of its schools.

== Schools ==
School	Location	Grades
Barlow Creek Elementary School	Quesnel	K–7
Bouchie Lake Elementary School	Quesnel	K–7
Carson Elementary School	Quesnel	K–7
Continuing Ed SD 28	Quesnel	Closed
Correlieu Secondary School	Quesnel	10–12
Dragon Lake Elementary School	Quesnel	K–7
Ecole Baker	Quesnel	closed June 2016
Kersley Elementary School	Quesnel	K–7
Lakeview Elementary School	Quesnel	K–7
McNaughton Centre	Quesnel	8–12
Nazko Valley Elementary School	Nazko	K–7
Parkland Elementary School	Quesnel	K–7
Quesnel Distributed Learning	Quesnel (distance)	K–12
Quesnel Junior School	Quesnel	8–9
Ecole Red Bluff Lhtako Elementary School	Quesnel	K–7
Riverview Elementary School	Quesnel	K–7
Voyageur Elementary School	Quesnel	K–7
Wells Barkerville Elementary School	Wells	K–7

== See also ==
- List of school districts in British Columbia
