= Takla Lake =

Lake in British Columbia, California

- Location within British Columbia
- Location: British Columbia
- Group: Nechako Lakes
- Coordinates: 55.31°N 125.77°W
- Primary inflows: Driftwood River
- Primary outflows: Middle River
- Basin countries: Canada
- Surface area: 246 km^{2} (95 sq mi)
- Average depth: 103.1 m (338 ft)
- Max. depth: 287 m (942 ft)
- Water volume: 25.36 km^{3} (6.08 cu mi)
- Surface elevation: 684 m (2,244 ft)

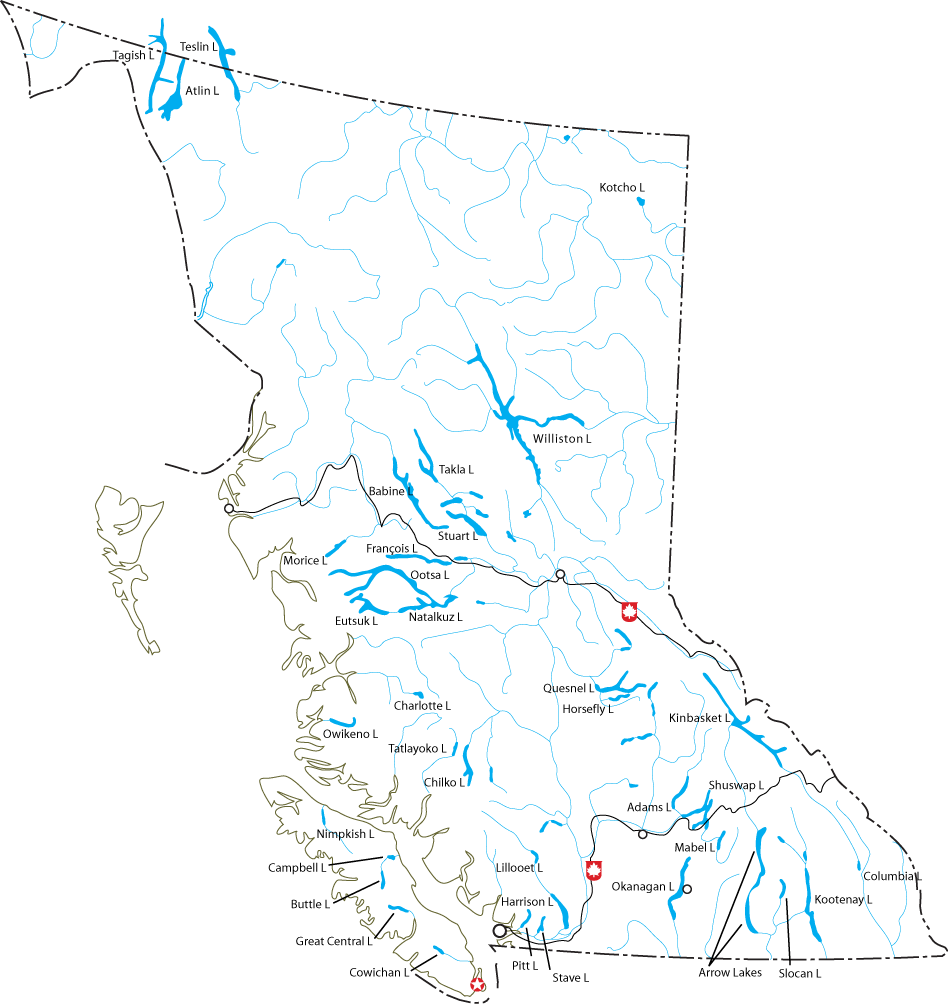
Lakes of British Columbia.

Takla Lake is the fifth largest natural lake in British Columbia, Canada. It is a deep fjord-like lake with the Swannell Ranges to the east, the Driftwood River flowing into it from the north, and the Middle River draining it. It is the terminus of the early Stuart-Takla sockeye salmon run, and noted for its large rainbow trout, lake trout and Dolly Varden. The peninsula is the home of Mount Blanchet Provincial Park. Also on the peninsula is a herd of collared woodland caribou, and the winter range of grizzly bears. Two special features are Takla Lake Marine Park, and an Ecological Reserve on the peninsula, a stand of very northerly Douglas Fir. Takla Lake is also the origin of both of Canada's national airlines, both Russ Baker and Grant McConachie running bush plane routes out of Takla Lake. It is a popular canoe route from the top end down to Fort St. James.

Takla Lake may be a corruption of thaitla, meaning "bottom of the lake" (18th Annual Report, G.B.C).

== See also ==
- List of lakes of British Columbia
