= Trembleur Lake =

- Cross Lake
- Location within British Columbia
- Location: Omineca Country, Central Interior of British Columbia, Canada
- Coordinates: 54°49′48″N 125°08′45″W
- Type: lake

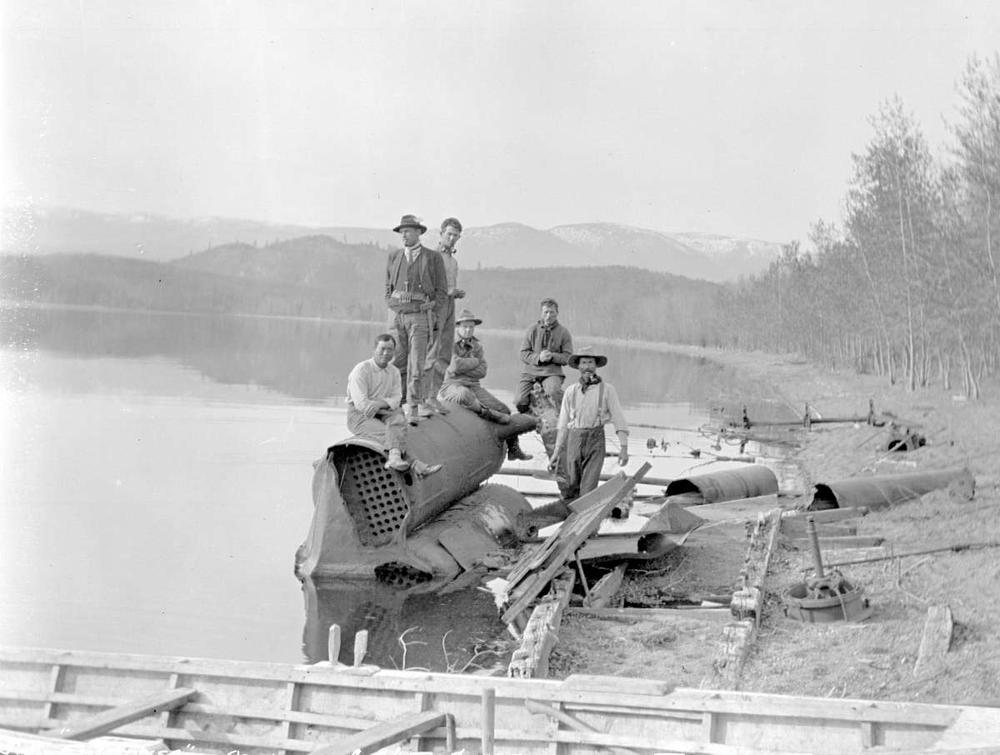
The steamship Enterprise supplied miners, during the Omineca Gold Rush, when she was wrecked on the lake in 1871.

Trembleur Lake is a lake in the Omineca Country of the Central Interior of British Columbia, Canada, northwest of Fort St. James between Stuart Lake and the south end of Takla Lake. It is part of the Nechako Lakes. Its name in the Dakelh language is Dzindlat Bun. It has also been known as Cross Lake. Trembleur Lake Provincial Park is on its north shore, above the Middle River. The reserve settlement of Middle River is at that river's mouth into Trembleur Lake.

== See also ==
- List of lakes of British Columbia
