= Quanchus Range =

Mountain range in British Columbia, Canada

- Location within British Columbia

Highest point
- Coordinates: 53°33′N 126°27′W

Geography
- Country: Canada
- Province: British Columbia
- Parent range: Nechako Plateau

The Quanchus Range is a subrange of the Nechako Plateau in the Interior of British Columbia, Canada, located on the north end of Tweedsmuir North Provincial Park and Protected Area. It is almost completely an island after the creation of the Nechako Reservoir. Its two main summits are Michel Peak (2260m) and Tweedsmuir Peak (2194m).
