= Tachie, British Columbia =

Carrier village in British Columbia, Canada

Coordinates: 54.654°N 124.760°W

Location of Tachie in British Columbia

Tachie is a Carrier village in British Columbia, located where the Tachie River enters Stuart Lake. It is one of the Indian reserves belonging to Tl'azt'en Nation. Tachie is the English spelling of the Carrier language name Tache.
