= West Road River =

West Road River Blackwater River
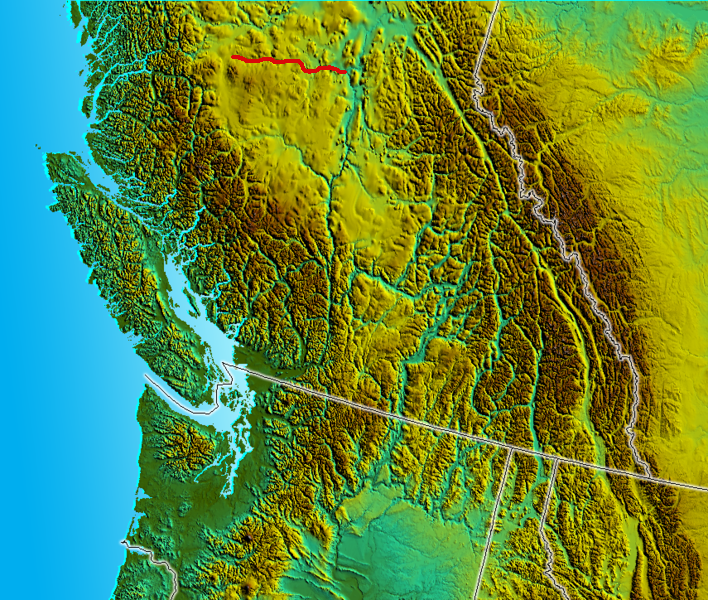
- Location of the West Road River

Location
- Country: Canada
- Province: British Columbia
- District: Cariboo Land District

Physical characteristics
- Source: Tundra Lake
  - location: Ilgachuz Range
  - coordinates: 52°48′N 125°22′W
  - elevation: 1,877 m (6,158 ft)
- Mouth: Fraser River
  - coordinates: 53°18′38″N 122°52′32″W
  - elevation: 497 m (1,631 ft)
- Length: 280 km (170 mi)
- Basin size: 12,000 km^{2} (4,600 sq mi)
- Discharge
  - location: gage 08KG001
  - average: 34.4 m^{3}/s (1,210 cu ft/s)
  - minimum: 4.90 m^{3}/s (173 cu ft/s)
  - maximum: 377 m^{3}/s (13,300 cu ft/s)

The West Road River or Blackwater River or Tiyakoh is an important tributary of the Fraser River, flowing generally north-eastward from the northern slopes of the Ilgachuz Range and across the Fraser Plateau in the Chilcotin region of central British Columbia, Canada. With only one major tributary, the Nazko River ("river flowing from the south" in the Carrier language), its confluence with the Fraser is approximately 40 km northwest of Quesnel. It forms the division between the Chilcotin Plateau (S) and the Nechako Plateau (N), which are subdivisions of the Fraser Plateau.

The river is 280 km (170 mi) long, draining an area of approximately 12,000 km^{2} (4,600 sq mi), and dropping over 900 m (3,000 ft) before joining with the Fraser.

The river is of significant historical importance to both First Nations and Canadian history. For centuries, the Dakelh (Carrier) and Tsilhqot'in peoples used a trail—the so-called "Grease Trail"—on the northern side of the river in their trade with coastal First Nations communities. The name Grease Trail refers to one of the main commodities transported along the route—eulachon grease, a highly prized staple, traces of which coated parts of the route after centuries of use. It was this trail that Sir Alexander Mackenzie used in his historic overland journey west to the Pacific Ocean in 1793, traversing the river itself on his return. He named the river in 1793.

The West Road (Blackwater) River has been designated as a heritage river by the government of British Columbia.

The two major settlements along the river are the Kluskus First Nation and Ulkatcho First Nation (Alexis Family). Near the river to its south, on the Nazko, is the settlement of Nazko, a ranching community, the focus of which is the reserve of the Nazko First Nation.

== See also ==
- List of tributaries of the Fraser River
- List of rivers of British Columbia
