= Nazko =

- City
- Location of Nazko in British Columbia
- Country: Canada
- Province: British Columbia
- Region: North Cariboo
- Regional district: Cariboo Regional District
- Founded: 1876

Population (2011)
  - Total: 1,511
- Time zone: UTC−07:00 (PT)

Nazko /ˈnæzkoʊ/ is a small ranching and logging community, including a historic First Nations community located 100 km west of Quesnel on the Nazko River in the Central Interior of British Columbia, Canada. Nazko means, "river flowing from the south".

Nazko is the gateway to the Nuxalk Carrier Grease-Alexander Mackenzie Heritage Trail. It has a sizeable Indian reserve, home to the Nazko First Nation, and is well known in ranching history.

The first schools were built in 1950 by ranchers and homesteaders, and in 1960 by the government of Canada. In 1984, BC Hydro brought electricity to the area and the following year the road from Quesnel to Nazko was paved.

Nazko is 22 kilometers from the Nazko Cone, which last erupted 7,200 years ago. From 2007 to 2008, a swarm of earthquakes occurred just 30 km (19 mi) west of Nazko Cone.

Nazko Community Association:

President (2013–present): Stewart Fraser

Former President (2012): Sabrina Fraser

Former President (2011): Vikki Roy

== Location ==
Nazko is in the Cariboo North Electoral District, in the Central Interior, 112 km west of Quesnel.
