= Carrier Sekani Tribal Council =

Tribal council representing eight First Nations in BC, Canada

The Carrier Sekani Tribal Council (familiarly known as CSTC) is a tribal council representing six First Nations in the Central Interior of British Columbia. It was originally known as the Lakes District Tribal Council. The CSTC was incorporated in 1981 and is a registered non-profit society.

== Member governments ==
Its current members are:

- Nadleh Whut'en First Nation
- Saik'uz First Nation
- Stellat'en First Nation
- Takla Lake First Nation
- Ts'il Kaz Koh First Nation (formerly known as Burns Lake Indian Band)
- Wet'suwet'en First Nation (formerly known as Broman Lake Band or Broman Lake Indian Band)

Not all Carrier or Sekani bands belong to CSTC. Three Blackwater Carrier bands, Ulkatcho Indian Band, Lhoosk'us Dene, and Red Bluff Indian Band, belong to Carrier-Chilcotin Tribal Council. Other bands, such as the Cheslatta Carrier Nation and the Lheidli T'enneh in the Prince George area, are independent.

The Nak’azdli Whut’en band was removed from the Council in 2019, at its own request.

== Chief and councillors ==
CSTC is governed by a General Manager, appointed by the Board of Directors (Chiefs of member Nations). Social services are provided by Carrier Sekani Family Services, a now separate organization spun off by CSTC. The Yinka Dene Language Institute, now defunct, was charged with linguistic and cultural matters, and was indirectly controlled by CSTC, which appointed the majority of its board of directors. Government to government negotiations and relations are provided by the Carrier Sekani First Nations Society which consists of seven member Nations (Nadleh Whut'en, Saik'uz First Nation, Stellat'en First Nation, Takla Nation, Tl'azt'en Nation and Ts'il Kaz Koh.

== Treaty process ==
In January 1994, the CSTC entered the treaty process. By April 1997, they had reached Stage 4 of the six-stage process - negotiation of an agreement in principle. The CSTC borrowed $14 million (CAN) from the government to resolve grievances regarding unceded territories. By 2007, negotiations reached a deadlock. In her report to Parliament in December 2006, Auditor General Sheila Fraser, noted that the financial burden placed on First Nations when negotiations are drawn out, are among the factors that have led some First Nations to use litigation or other options for settling land claims. DINA's process was complex, inflexible and slow. In March 2007 during a Treaty Forum hosted by the CSTC that provided an opportunity for the Membership to listen to the Governments and the British Columbia Treaty Commission officials, the CSTC made the historic decision to vote to abandon treaty negotiations because the British Columbia Treaty Process had failed to produce expected results in Carrier territory.

== Mandate ==
The CSTC focuses on issues related to Carrier & Sekani heritage and identity, self-government, land claims, standard of living, social and economic independence and public relations on behalf of member nations.

== History ==
CSTC has at times included other bands. Lake Babine Nation band left CSTC in 1991. Lheidli T'enneh left in 1992. Burns Lake Band withdrew in 1993 but subsequently returned.

In 2006 the CSTC commissioned and oversaw the Aboriginal Interest and Use Study (AIUS) to investigate impacts of the Enbridge oil pipeline proposal.

In October 2010 the Supreme Court ruled against the tribal council in CSTC vs. Rio Tinto Alcan. The court ruled that nobody was obligated to come to First Nations to consult on the issue of the Electricity Purchase Agreement (EPA) structured between BC Hydro and Alcan. However, the high court noted that, "The Kenny Dam was built without consultation and at the time, CSTC or its member nations were not permitted to hire a lawyer under the Indian Act. That said, the project itself was built without consultation and the Supreme Court now says First Nations can receive compensation on the lack of consultation."

The CSTC had claimed that, "[i]n the 1950s, the government of British Columbia authorized the building of a dam and reservoir which altered the amount and timing of water flows in the Nechako River. The First Nations claim the Nechako Valley as their ancestral homeland, and the right to fish in the Nechako River, but, pursuant to the practice at the time, they were not consulted about the dam project."

== Demographics ==
The estimated total number of CSTC members was 25,682 in 2004 according to DINA.

== Social, educational and cultural programs and facilities ==
In addition to representing its members in treaty negotiations with British Columbia and Canada and in various other dealings, CSTC provides technical and professional services to its members in such areas as fisheries, education, economic development, community and infrastructure planning, forestry, and financial management. Carrier Sekani Family Services provides health, child welfare and other services to member nations.

== See also ==
- Dakelh
- Carrier language
- Carrier-Chilcotin Tribal Council
- Lheidli T'enneh
- List of tribal councils in British Columbia
