= Dakelh =

Indigenous people in British Columbia, Canada

- Communities living within the Dakelh language area

Regions with significant populations
- Canada (British Columbia)

Languages
- English, Dakelh

Religion
- Animism

Related ethnic groups
- Other Dene peoples Especially Wet'suwet'en, Babine, Tsilhqotʼin, and Sekani

The Dakelh (pronounced ['takʰɛɬ]) or Carrier are a First Nations Indigenous people living a large portion of the Central Interior of British Columbia, Canada. The Dakelh also call themselves Yinka Dene ("the people on the land"), and the Babine-Witsuwitʼen-speaking bands prefer the equivalent Yinka Whutʼen ("the people on the land"). Sometimes in old travelogues and ethnographic works they are also referred to as Porteurs and Taculli.

The Dakelh people are a First Nations people of the Central Interior of British Columbia, Canada, for whom Carrier has been a common English name derived from French explorers naming of the people. Dakelh people speak two related languages. One, Babine-Witsuwit'en is sometimes referred to as Northern Carrier. The other includes what are sometimes referred to as Central Carrier and Southern Carrier. They speak Witsuwitʼen or Babine/Nedut'en, dialects of the Babine-Witsuwitʼen language which, like its sister Dakelh language, is a part of the Central British Columbia branch of the Northern Athabaskan languages. They belong to the Northern Athabascan or Dene peoples (Dené is the common Athabaskan word for "people").

== Name ==
The autonym of the Dakelh, or Dakelh-ne (ᑕᗸᒡ) translated to “travel upon water”, literally "people who travel by boat early in the morning", a Synaeresis of uda ukelh and ne. The suffixes -xwoten, “people of” or -t’en, “people” to village names or locations to refer to specific groups (for example, Tl’azt’en or Wet’suwet’en).

The Wetʼsuwetʼen (Whutsot'en, ᗘᙢᗥᐣ, "People of the Wet'sinkwha/Wa Dzun Kwuh River, i.e. Bulkley River", lit: "People of the blue and green River"; also known as Western Carrier) and Babine (Nadot'en) (Nadot'enne, ᘇᑎᗥᐣ, "Lake Babine People"; also known as Northern Carrier) peoples are a branch of the Dakelh/Carrier people, and have been referred to as the Western Carrier.

== Geography ==
Dakelh territories called Keyoh, include the area along Fraser River (Lhtakoh – "rivers within one another") from north of Prince George (Lheidli – "confluence") to south of Quesnel and including the Barkerville-Wells area, the Nechako Country, the areas around Stuart Lake (Nak'albun – "Mount Pope lake"), Trembleur Lake (Dzinghubun – "day after lake"), Takla Lake (Khelhghubun – "load after lake"), Fraser Lake (Nadlehbun – "(fish) run lake"), and Babine Lake, the Bulkley Valley, and the region along the West Road River, west to the Hazelton Mountains and the Kitimat Ranges of the Coast Mountains, including the Kluskus Lakes (Lhoosk'uz – "Rocky Mountain whitefish place"), Ootsa Lake (Oosa Bunk'ut – "bucket lake"), the Quanchus and Fawnie Ranges, and Cheslatta Lake (Tsetl'adak Bunk'ut – "Peak Rock Lake").

Dakelh territories are for the most part sub-boreal forest, dotted with numerous lakes. There are numerous rivers, all ultimately draining into the Pacific Ocean, mostly via the Fraser River. The climate is continental, with cold winters during which the rivers and lakes freeze over and a short growing season. The area is hilly, with mountains of modest size. The Rocky Mountains form the eastern boundary of the Dakelh territories, but the Dakelh are not very familiar with the foothills because that area in recent times has been occupied by the Cree (Dushina, ᑐᙘᘇ). Part of the Coast Mountains and Hazelton Mountains fall within Wit'suwit'en territory. Farther south, 'Ulkatcho people share the Coast Range with the Coast Salish Nuxalkmc (Bella Coola) and the northern Chilcotin Plateau with Northern Athabaskan speaking strong warrior nation (with political influence from the Similkameen region in the south (of British Columbia), the Pacific coast in the west, and the Rocky Mountains in the east) Tsilhqot'in (Chilkot'in, ᗘᙢᗥᐣ).

== Culture ==
The traditional Dakelh way of life is based on a seasonal round, with the greatest activity in the summer when berries are gathered and fish caught and preserved. The mainstay of the economy is centered on harvesting activities within each family keyoh (ᗸᘏᑋ, territory, village, trapline) under the leadership of a hereditary chief, known as a Keyoh holder or keyoh-whudachun. Fish, especially the several varieties of salmon, are smoked and stored for the winter in large numbers. Hunting and trapping of deer, caribou, moose, elk, black bear, beaver, and rabbit provided meat, fur for clothing, and bone for tools. Other fur-bearing animals are trapped to some extent, but until the advent of the fur trade, such trapping is a minor activity. With the exception of berries and the sap and cambium of the lodgepole pine, plants play a relatively minor role as food, though the sacredness of plants are appreciated by Dakelh people. The Dakelh are familiar with and occasionally use a variety of edible plants. Plants are used extensively for medicine. Winter activity is more limited, with some hunting, trapping, and fishing under the ice. Although many Dakelh now have jobs and otherwise participate in the non-traditional economy, fish, game, and berries still constitute a major portion of the diet.

The Dakelh engaged in extensive trade with the coast along trails known as "grease trails". The items exported consisted primarily of hides, dried meat, and mats of dried berries. Imports consisted of various marine products, the most important of which was "grease", the oil extracted from eulachons (also known as "candlefish") by allowing them to rot, adding boiling water, and skimming off the oil. This oil is extremely nutritious and, unlike many other fats, contains desirable fatty acids. Other important imports were smoked eulachons and dried red laver seaweed. "Grease" and smoked eulachons are still considered by many to be delicacies and are prized gifts from visitors from the west. The route by which Sir Alexander MacKenzie and his party reached the Pacific Ocean in 1793 in the first crossing of North America by land was, from the Fraser River westward, a grease trail. Other examples include the Cheslatta Trail and the Nyan Wheti.

=== Ethnobotany ===
==== Plants used in cuisine ====
They use the berries of Vaccinium vitis-idaea to make jam.

==== Plants used medicinally ====
They take a decoction of the entire plant of Viola adunca for stomach pain. The Southern Carrier use a strong decoction of the root of Orthilia as an eyewash.

A full list of their ethnobotany can be found at http://naeb.brit.org/uses/tribes/27/, http://naeb.brit.org/uses/tribes/28/, and http://naeb.brit.org/uses/tribes/29/.

== History ==
=== Salvage archaeology ===
In the late 1940s, University of British Columbia professor Charles Edward Borden shifted his attention toward urgent salvage archaeology in Nechako Canyon after learning of the planned Kemano reservoir that would flood the canyon, a large part of Dakelh hunting territory in Tweedsmuir Park. In 1951, he received funding from Alcan and the British Columbia Ministry of Education to undertake salvage archaeology at the "Carrier Indian site". In 1951, Borden and his protégé, anthropology student Wilson Duff, located over 130 sites of importance to Cheslatta T'en history. They conducted more intensive investigations prior to the flooding of the area. The damming triggered "devastating changes for First Nations communities whose traditional territories lay in their path, including the destruction of Aboriginal gravesites, territories, livelihoods, and archaeological sites." In 1957, Alcan opened the spillway gate to Skin's Lake, desecrating Cheslatta graves, which came to public attention during the Royal Commission on Aboriginal Peoples.

In 1951, Borden began survey and excavation of the site and returned to work there every summer until he retired in 1970. His final article published in Science in 1979 was based on excavations of early microblade assemblages at Namu in 1977.

== Language ==
The Carrier people speak the Carrier language, which is endangered.

== Bands ==
As an ethnic term, Carrier or Dakelh includes speakers of both the Dakelh language proper and its sister language Babine-Witsuwit'en, both of which are endangered languages.

Band	IPA	Translation	Language	Tribal Council	Location
Cheslatta Carrier Nation			Dakelh	Independent	Cheslatta Lake
Kluskus Indian Band (Lhoosk’uzt’en)		"the half or side of the white fish is white"	Dakelh	Carrier Chilcotin Tribal Council	Kluskus (band offices are in Quesnel (Genel))
Lheidli T'enneh Band (Lheidlit'en, ᘱᐉᘬᗥᐣ)		"People of the confluence, i.e. of Prince George"	Dakelh	Independent	Prince George (Lheidli)
Nadleh Whut'en First Nation (Nadleht'en / Nadleh Whut'enne, ᘇᘫᑋᗥᐣ)		"People of the (salmon) run, i.e. along the Nautley River"	Dakelh	Carrier Sekani Tribal Council	Fort Fraser
Nak'azdli Indian Band (Nak'azdlit'en, ᘇᘀᙆᘬᗥᐣ)		"People from where the Stuart River begins to flow, i.e. from Stuart Lake"	Dakelh	Independent	Fort St. James
Nazko Indian Band (Nazkot’en)		"People along the river flowing from the south, i.e. Nazko River"	Dakelh	Carrier Chilcotin Tribal Council	Nazko
Red Bluff Indian Band (Nak'azdlit'en, ᘇᘀᙆᘬᗥᐣ, or Lhtakot’en)		"People from downstream" or "People from where the three rivers meet" (formerly Quesnel Band)	Dakelh	Carrier Chilcotin Tribal Council	Quesnel (Genel)
Saik'uz First Nation (Saik'uzwhut'en / Saik'uẕ Whut'enne, ᙓᐉᗽᙆᗘᗥᐣ)		"Stony Creek Village People", "on the sand"	Dakelh	Carrier Sekani Tribal Council	Vanderhoof
Stellat'en First Nation (Stellat'en / Stella Whut'enne)		"People of the peninsula, lit. People of Stella(koh) Village” (formerly Stellaquo Indian Band)	Dakelh	Carrier Sekani Tribal Council	Fraser Lake
Tl'azt'en Nation		People of the end of the lake	Dakelh	Carrier Sekani Tribal Council	Stuart Lake-Trembleur Lake
Ulkatcho First Nation (‘Ulkatchot’en)		“fat of the land” or "fertile place"	Dakelh	Carrier Chilcotin Tribal Council	Anahim Lake
Yekooche First Nation		mouth of Yekoh River	Dakelh	Independent	Stuart Lake
Lake Babine Nation (Nat'oot'en / Nadot'enne)		"Babine Lake People"	Babine-Witsuwit'en	Independent	Burns Lake & Babine Lake
Witset First Nation			Babine-Witsuwit'en	Independent	Witset
Nee Tahi Buhn Band			Babine-Witsuwit'en	Independent	south of Francois Lake
Skin Tyee Band			Babine-Witsuwit'en	Independent	Skins Lake, south of Francois Lake
Takla Lake First Nation		end of the lake	Babine-Witsuwit'en and Sekani	Carrier Sekani Tribal Council	Takla Lake
Wet'suwet'en First Nation (Whutsot'en, ᗘᙢᗥᐣ)			Babine-Witsuwit'en	Carrier Sekani Tribal Council	Burns Lake
Ts’il Kaz Koh First Nation (Burns Lake Indian Band)		hone creek	Mixed Dakelh-Babine-Witsuwit'en (historically Carrier)	Carrier Sekani Tribal Council	Burns Lake
Hagwilget			Babine-Witsuwit'en	Hereditary Chiefs	Hagwilget

=== Tribal councils ===
Seven bands form the Carrier Sekani Tribal Council:

- Burns Lake Indian Band,
- Saik'uz First Nation,
- Stellat'en First Nation,
- Tl'azt'en Nation,
- Takla Lake First Nation,
- Wet'suwet'en First Nation

Four bands belong to the Carrier Chilcotin Tribal Council:

- Kluskus Indian Band
- Nazko Indian Band
- Red Bluff Indian Band
- Ulkatcho Indian Band
- Toosey Indian Band of the Tsilhqot'in people is also a member of the CCTC

The other bands are independent.

== Synonymy ==
In some of the literature Dakelh people are known by the French term Porteurs. Another term sometimes seen is Taculli along with variant spellings. This is a linguistically naive adaptation of the phonetic notation used by Father Adrien-Gabriel Morice. The first written reference to Dakelh people, in the journal of Sir Alexander MacKenzie, uses the term Nagailer.

== Etymology of name ==
The received view of the origin of the Sekani name aɣelne for the Dakelh, of which the English name is a translation, is that it refers to the distinctive Dakelh mortuary practice in which a widow carried her husband's ashes on her back during the period of mourning. One problem for this hypothesis is that there is little evidence of the existence of this custom, the report of which is due to Father Morice. According to Lizette Hall's (1992) father, Louie-Billy Prince, who had been Father Morice's houseboy and knew him well, Father Morice pestered the Dakelh so persistently on the origin of the name that they finally told him the story about widows carrying ashes to satisfy him. An alternative hypothesis is that it refers to the fact that the Dakelh, unlike the Sekani, participated in trade with the coast, which required packing loads of goods over the Grease Trails.

== See also ==
- Dakelh language
- Edward John
- Mary John Sr.
- Rose Prince
- Chief Kwah (aka Kw'eh)

== Bibliography ==
- Birchwater, Sage (1991). 'Ulkatchot'en : the people of Ulkatcho. Illustrated by Ronald Cahoose. Anahim Lake: Ulkatcho Cultural Curriculum Development Committee. ISBN 978-0-9695308-0-0.
- Birchwater, Sage (1991). Ulkatcho: Stories of the Grease Trail. Illustrated by Ronald Cahoose. Anahim Lake, BC: Ulkatcho Cultural Curriculum Development Committee.
- Brown, Doug (2002). "Carrier Sekani Self-Government in Context: Land and Resources" (PDF). Western Geography. 12: 21–67. Archived from the original (PDF) on 2017-08-11.
- Furniss, Elizabeth (1993). Dakelh keyoh: The Southern Carrier in Earlier Times. Quesnel, BC: Quesnel School District. ISBN 978-0-9693638-8-0.
- Furniss, Elizabeth (1993). Changing Ways: Southern Carrier History 1793-1940. Quesnel, BC: Quesnel School District. ISBN 978-0-9693638-9-7.
- Goldman, Irving (1940). "The Alkatcho Carrier of British Columbia". In Linton, Ralph (ed.). Acculturation in Seven American Indian Tribes. New York: Appleton-Century. pp. 333–389. LCCN 40003756.
- Hall, Lizette (1992). The Carrier, My People. Quesnel, BC: Lizette Hall. ISBN 978-0-9696211-0-2.
- Hudson, Douglas R. (1983). Traplines and Timber: Social and Economic Change among the Carrier Indians of British Columbia (PhD dissertation thesis). Edmonton: University of Alberta.
- Tobey, Margaret L. (1981). "Carrier". In Helm, June (ed.). Handbook of North American Indians. Vol. 6: Subarctic. Washington, DC: Smithsonian Institution. pp. 413–432.
