= James Lavadour =

American painter

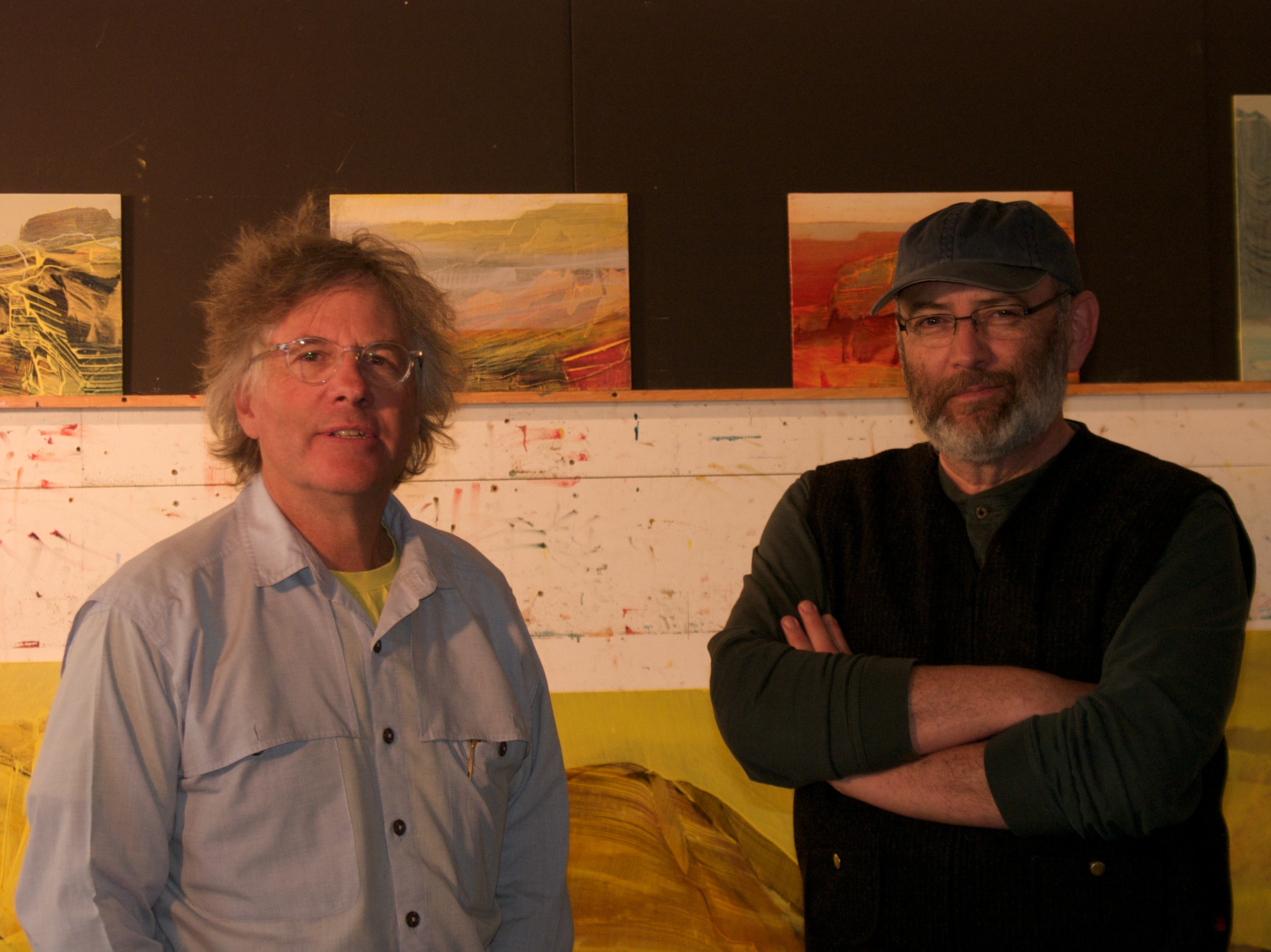
- James Lavadour (right) with Spencer B. Beebe of Ecotrust
- Born: James Lavadour; 1951 (age 74–75); Pendleton, Oregon
- Education: Self-taught
- Known for: Painting, printmaking
- Website: http://pdxcontemporaryart.com/lavadour

James Lavadour (born 1951) is an American painter and printmaker. A member of the Walla Walla tribe, he is known for creating large panel sets of landscape paintings. Lavadour is the co-founder of the Crow's Shadow Institute of the Arts.

I believe that a painting must stand up on its own without explanation. I think of myself as an abstract action painter. I just happen to see landscape in the abstract events of paint. - James Lavadour

== Background ==
I'm a tribal member and grew up on the Umatilla reservation, and I love it there. One of the aspects of tribal life is that the land and I are one. - 2005

=== Early life ===
James Lavadour was born in 1951 to parents of Chinook, Walla Walla, German, Irish, Assiniboine, and French Canadian descent in Pendleton, Oregon. Discovering his love for painting as a child, Lavadour never completed high school, however he was encouraged by his family to explore his artistic endeavors. As a child he was inspired by what he described as "The Sistine Chapel": the peeling and water stained ceiling of his grandmothers house, with its drips and exposed layers, a visual experience that would influence his work for the rest of his life.

When he was young, his parents worked at the Washington State Penitentiary in Walla Walla. A troubled teenager and a poor student, he focused on working at any job he could find: delivery boy, canner, janitor, carpenter, and even a firefighter. Without opportunities to gain formal artistic training he used books to explore the world of art and culture, including books about: Charles Marion Russell, Robert Rauschenberg, Richard Diebenkorn, Pierre Bonnard, J. M. W. Turner, and Franz Kline. The major turn for his artistic interest came with exploring Chinese and Asian art, a different creation process where "the kinetic experience is the essence of making art."

=== Professional and personal life ===
Exhibiting in Seattle, Washington since the 1970s, Lavadour's first major exhibitions came with his involvement in Sacred Circle, a Native American art gallery.

A hiker, Lavadour's exploration of the mountain regions of his home continue to serve as a major source of inspiration for his work today.

== Fine art career ==
I use two elemental structures, a landscape and an architectural abstraction (a vortex and a grid). There's the flow of landscape and then the intersection of the architectural structure, which is just like being in a room looking out a window, with floors, angles, walls, doors, ceilings, pathways. A painting is a complex event with many things going on at multiple levels. Close, far, color, layers, scrapes, and drips all swirled around by memories. I keep it all organized with structure. Structure is the bed to the river.
- James Lavadour

Rejecting the iconography and symbolism inherent in Western art, Lavadour believes that rather than trying to make his artwork mean something it eventually just became something. A theory of rejection that he credits to his relationship with the environment and growing up on the Umatilla reservation.

=== Early work ===
Primarily self-taught, Lavadour grew up exploring his environment on the Umatilla Indian Reservation and Western Oregon. His earlier works, reminiscent of German romanticism, displayed what an impact geology and landscape had on his creation process through his own monochromatic abstract lens (he described these works as his Interiors). Described as "emotional interpretations of the land," these Interiors tend to look like painted, hazy photograph-like paintings with streaks of color traveling through them.

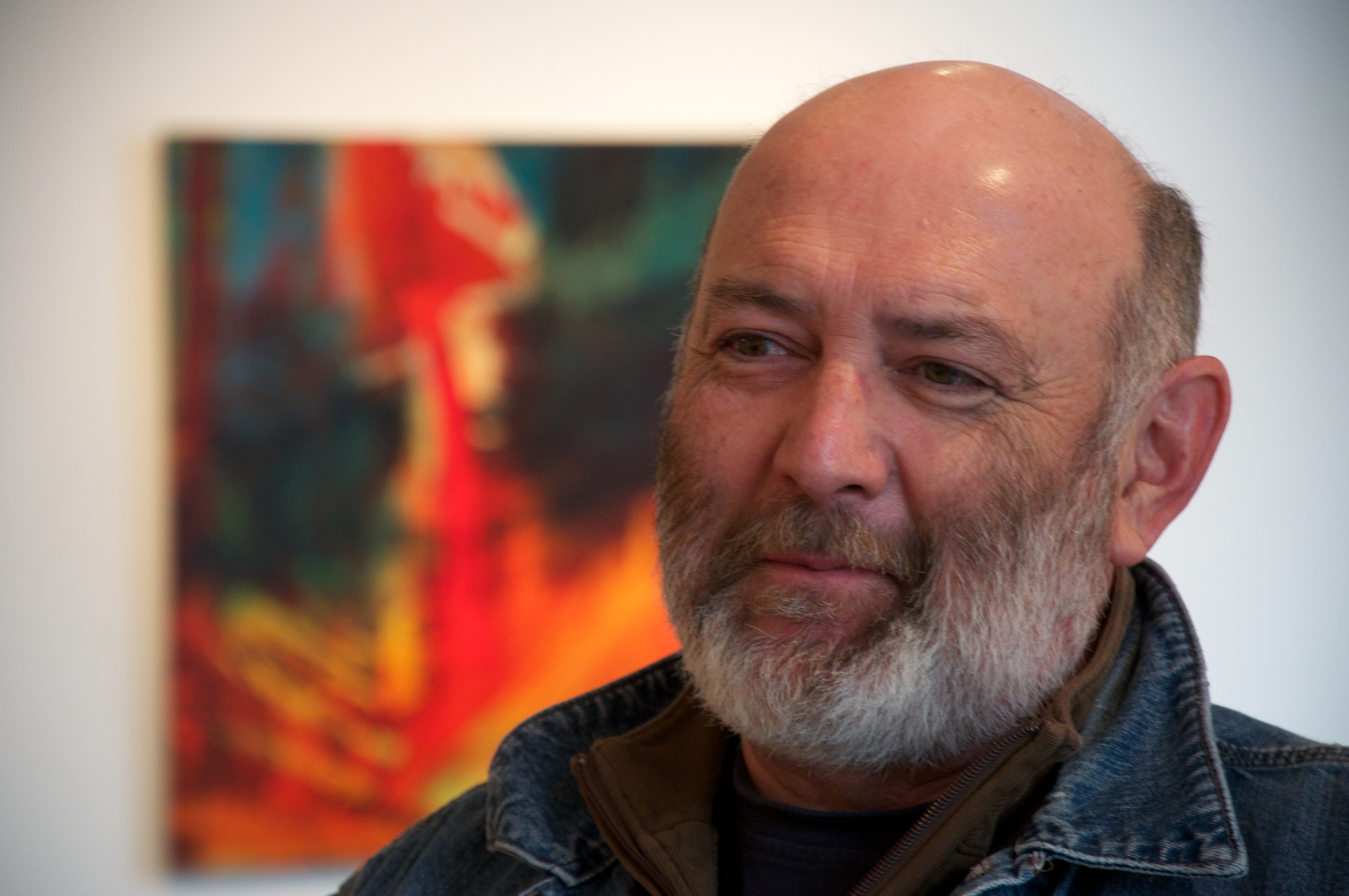
James Lavadour at PDX Contemporary Art gallery, 2012

=== Current work ===
In the 1990s Lavadour started to explore printmaking. The melding of printmaking with his painting led to complex layer usage in these new works. The layering technique of printmaking makes the geological features of the landscape look like maps or as if they are moving. These new works have also been compared to the art of Gerhard Richter. He also began to explore other themes, influenced by his interest in Chinese painting, abstract expressionism and jazz music (specifically John Coltrane), however, landscapes continue to be the basis for his work.

The usage of panels is also seen throughout Lavadour's work, involving selections of works placed together to provide a panorama and visual exploration of the environment through Lavadour's eyes. Lavadour is represented by PDX Contemporary Art, in Portland.

=== Creation process ===
He wakes up about 3:00 AM every morning to work in his studio on the Confederated Tribes of the Umatilla Indian Reservation. Music serves as an inspiration and a motivator; often jazz music by the likes of some of his favorite artists: John Coltrane, Sun Ra and Miles Davis.

Lavadour's process generally involves applying layers of paint, then scraping or wiping it away, performing his own form of erosion on his unique landscapes. He believes there are two major aspects to his work: the capturing of the sediments, layers and shape of the physical scenery, and then an exploration of the energy of that scenery, its emotions and its relationship with the cosmos. This exploration allows him to discover the physics of the paint - the way it moves on the canvas and its final form, over the color manipulation that many artists often focus on.

=== Crow's Shadow Institute of the Arts ===
Motivated by his experiences as a fellow at Rutgers University, in 1990 Lavadour co-founded Crow's Shadow Institute of the Arts, a non-profit arts organization that brings "technology, instruction and cultural exchange" to artists on the Umatilla Indian Reservation.

== Notable collections ==
- Whitney Museum of American Art
- Denver Art Museum
- Heard Museum
- Indian Arts and Crafts Board
- National Museum of the American Indian
- Qwest Corporation
- Seattle Arts Commission
- Washington State Arts Commission
- Eiteljorg Museum of American Indians and Western Art
- Bank of America
- Boise Art Museum
- Ecotrust
- Hilton
- Microsoft

== Major exhibitions ==
- Stretching the Canvas: Eight Decades of Native Painting, 2019–21, National Museum of the American Indian George Gustav Heye Center
- Venice Biennale, collateral exhibition, 2013
- Vantage Point, 2010, National Museum of the American Indian
- James Lavadour: The Properties of Paint, 2008, Hallie Ford Museum of Art
- A Sense of Place: Selections from the Tacoma Art Museum Collection, 2005, Tacoma Art Museum
- Into the Fray: The Eiteljorg Fellowship for Native American Fine Art, 2005, Eiteljorg Museum of American Indians and Western Art
- Lewis and Clark Territory: Contemporary Artists Revisit Place, Race and Memory, 2005, Tacoma Art Museum
- Site Unseen: A Contemporary Look at Landscape, 2005, Savannah College of Art and Design
- Seattle Perspective, 2004, Seattle Convention Center
- 2003 Oregon Biennial, 2003, Portland Art Museum
- Solo exhibition, 2002, Maryhill Museum of Art
- Solo exhibition, 2001, Northwest Museum of Arts and Culture
- Solo exhibition, 1998, Pacific Northwest College of Art
- Land, Spirit, Power, 1992, National Gallery of Canada (NGC) Lavadour also participated in the symposium for this international travelling exhibition co-curated by Diana Nemiroff, Robert Houle, and Charlotte Townsend-Gault— the NGC's first major exhibition featuring a new generation of Aboriginal artists.
- Solo exhibition, 1990, Portland Art Museum
- Solo exhibition, 1990, Boise Art Museum

Lavadour has also exhibited at numerous private galleries.

== Awards ==
- Eiteljorg Fellowship, 2005, Eiteljorg Museum of American Indians and Western Art
- Honorary Doctorates in Humane Letters, 1999, Eastern Oregon University
- Joan Mitchell Fellowship for Painting, 1998, Joan Mitchell Foundation
- Rutgers Center for Innovative Print Making Fellow, 1995, Rutgers University
- Oregon Governor's Arts Award, 1994
- Betty Bowen Award, 1991, Seattle Museum of Art
