= Celery Stalks at Midnight =

Celery Stalks at Midnight may refer to:

- "Celery Stalks at Midnight," a song by Doris Day with Les Brown
- Celery Stalks at Midnight, an album by Al Simmons
- The Celery Stalks at Midnight, a children's novel by James Howe
