= Marcel Gagnon =

Marcel Gagnon may refer to:

- Marcel Gagnon (politician)
- Marcel Gagnon (musician)
