= Kym Gouchie =

Canadian musician and visual artist

Kym Gouchie is an indigenous Canadian musician and visual artist. She plays the acoustic guitar and traditional hand drum, sings, composes songs, and tells stories. Her music often deals with First Nations, women's and environmental issues and promotes reconciliation and community building.

== Personal life and education ==
Gouchie was born in 1964 to Ernie Gouchie, a son of prominent elder Mary Gouchie, and Robin Gouchie. She is a member of the Lheidli T'enneh First Nation, a Dakelh nation whose territory includes the city of Prince George, British Columbia, where she lives. She is of Dakelh (Carrier), Secwépemc (Shuswap), Cree and Irish ancestry. She has four children and ten grandchildren.

Kym received her training as an artist in the Fine Arts Diploma Program at the University College of the Cariboo, now Thompson Rivers University, in the Northwest Coast Native Art and Silk-screening program at the Prince George Native Friendship Centre, and in the National Aboriginal Professional Artist Training Program at the En’owkin Centre in Penticton, British Columbia.

== Artistic work ==
Gouchie performs frequently, both solo and as part of several groups, all over British Columbia as well as elsewhere in Canada and in the United States. Apple Music characterizes her musical style as '‘alternative folk'’

Most of her songs are in English, but Gouchie has also composed songs in her endangered ancestral Carrier language, working especially with her grandmother Mary Gouchie, one of the last fluent speakers of the Lheidli dialect, until her death in 2019 at the age of 97. In 2008 she received a C$8,000 grant from the Canada Council for the Arts to compose songs in the Lheidli dialect.

== Influence ==
Gouchie's music has inspired others. Angela Rudden, principal violist with the National Ballet of Canada and music teacher at the Dixon Hall Music School in Toronto, was inspired by Gouchie's 2016 song "Cleansing the Highway of Tears" and played it to her class. She and her students then wrote an orchestral score to accompany the song. Gouchie subsequently recorded a new vocal track to accompany their score.

== Awards and honours ==
In August 2015 her single 'For the People' was included in a collection of information about the Canadian Indian residential school system, the Truth & Reconciliation Compilation CD. The same month her single 'Sister Rain' made it to the top of the NCIFM National Aboriginal Top 40 Music Countdown.

In 2019 Gouchie received the Stingray Rising Star Award at the Mundial Montreal world music conference and festival. The following year she was an invited speaker at the International Indigenous Music Summit in New Orleans, Louisiana.

In 2022 Gouchie received the Jeanne Clark Local History Service Award from the Prince George Public Library for her efforts to preserve Lheidli T'enneh history, culture, language, and music.

The same year, she received a gold medal for her contributions to the BC Summer Games, where she performed in the opening ceremonies and for which she designed the medal ribbons, with themes based on local wildlife.

In 2025 she was one of the five nominees for the Juno Award for Children's Album of the Year.

== Discography ==
- Mountain of Youth (2014)
- Sister Rain (2015)
- In the Hearts of You & Me (2016)
- Northern Shining Star Woman (2017)
