= Charlotte Townsend-Gault =

Art historian, author, and curator

Charlotte Townsend-Gault is an art historian, professor emeritus, author, and curator. Townsend-Gault's research, teaching and scholarship concerns contemporary visual and material Native American and First Nations cultures, particularly those of the Pacific Northwest.

== Education ==
She has a bachelor of Arts degree from the University of Sussex. She also has a PhD in Social Anthropology from the University College London (1988).

== Background ==
Townsend-Gault developed early career experience as curator of the Mezzanine Gallery at the Nova Scotia College of Art and Design (NSCAD) between 1969 and 1973. She then left NSCAD to pursue her doctoral studies, subsequently joining the Department of Art History, Visual Art and Theory (AHVA) at the University of British Columbia (UBC) in the late 1980s.

Townsend-Gault is also an Associate faculty member (emeritus) with the Department of Anthropology at UBC, and an Honorary Professor in the Department of Anthropology at University College London.

== Scholarship ==
Townsend-Gault's own writing and collaborative editorial projects are recognized as foundational reading for students and scholars working in the areas of museums studies, museum anthropology, and the art history of Indigenous arts of the Northwest Coast.

The 2013 anthology Native Art of the Northwest Coast: A History of Changing Ideas was co-edited by Townsend-Gault, Jennifer Kramer and Ki-Ke-In, and has been awarded three prizes:

- 2015 Canada Prize in the Humanities (Federation for the Humanities and Social Sciences)
- 2015 Jeanne Clarke Award for Publication, Prince George Public Library
- Melva J. Dwyer Award, Art Libraries Society of North America.

Townsend-Gault's writing has appeared in art history and anthropology journals, and she has participated as a reviewer in publications such as RACAR, Vanguard and C Magazine.

== Selected publications ==
=== Books and exhibition catalogues ===
- Charlotte Townsend-Gault, Jennifer Kramer and Ki-Ke-In. Native Art of the Northwest Coast: A History of Changing Ideas. Vancouver: UBC Press, 2013.
- Karen Duffek and Charlotte Townsend-Gault. Bill Reid and Beyond: Expanding on Modern Native Art. Vancouver: Douglas & McIntyre, 2004.
- Townsend-Gault, Charlotte and James Luna. Rebecca Belmore: The Named and the Unnamed. Vancouver BC: Morris and Helen Belkin Art Gallery UBC, 2003. e-Artexte: https://e-artexte.ca/id/eprint/21312/ Belkin.
- Diana Nemiroff, Robert Houle, and Charlotte Townsend-Gault. Land, Spirit, Power: First Nations at the National Gallery of Canada. National Gallery of Canada, 1992.

=== Book chapters ===
- “The Raven, the Eagle, the Sparrows, and Thomas Crow: Making Native Modernism on the Northwest Coast.” In Essays on Native Modernism: complexities and contradiction in American Indian art. (Washington, D.C.: National Museum of the American Indian, Smithsonian Institution, 2006).
- "Ways of Knowing" (revised), in The Anthropology of Art: a reader, edited by Howard Morphy and Morgan Perkins. (Malden, MA: Blackwell Pub., 2006).
- “When the (Oven) Gloves Are Off: The Queen’s Baton – Doing What to Whom.” In Beyond Aesthetics: Art and the Technologies of Enchantment, edited by Nicholas Thomas and Christopher Pinney. (Oxford: Berg, 2001).
- “Conceptual Daze At NSCAD – The Mezzanine.” In Conceptual Art: The NSCAD Connection 1967-1973, edited and curated by Bruce Barber. Nova Scotia College of Art and Design. (Halifax, N.S.: Anna Leonowens Gallery, 2001).
