= Barry Seymour =

Barry Leslie Seymour (April 26, 1959 - April 3, 2026) was a prominent aboriginal leader in British Columbia. A member of the Lheidli T'enneh First Nation, whose territory includes the city of Prince George, British Columbia, he was elected chief in 1995 and served four terms, until 2005, during which he led economic development efforts. On July 28, 2003 he signed an Agreement in Principle with British Columbia and Canada, a major step toward a treaty covering Lheidli T'enneh's unceded territory.

Prior to his election as chief, Seymour worked as his band's Lands Manager and played a major role in the development of the Prince George Native Friendship Centre, of which he served as President. He took on numerous roles in aboriginal and local organizations. In 1988 he was Vice-Chief of the Carrier Sekani Tribal Council. He served as President of the Prince George Aboriginal Business Development Centre. and as President of the United Native Nations

He played a major role in the creation of the Central Interior Native Health Society (now known as Soonats'ooneh) and later served as the Executive Director of the Vancouver Native Health Society In 2004 he was appointed to the Community Advisory Group of the British Columbia Ministry of Forests.

He served as a director of The Exploration Place museum from 2010 until his death and played a major role in developing exhibits about his Carrier people and territory. The permanent gallery "Hodul’eh-a : A Place of Learning" which he helped to create won the Governor General's History Award for Excellence in Community Programming in 2017.

== Personal life ==
In his youth he excelled in sports, especially fastball and football, and in his later life was an active supporter of local sports and frequently in attendance at games. He loved to hunt and fish. He held the noble title "Tus̲yen" in the Saik'uz clan system. He died of a heart attack on April 3, 2026 at the age of 66. He is survived by his wife Phyllis, daughters Tasha, Tandi, and Tamara, son Trent mother Vera, and brothers Calvin, Jim, and Darcy.
