= Mr. PG =

City mascot in Prince George, British Columbia

Coordinates: 53°53′49″N 122°46′07″W

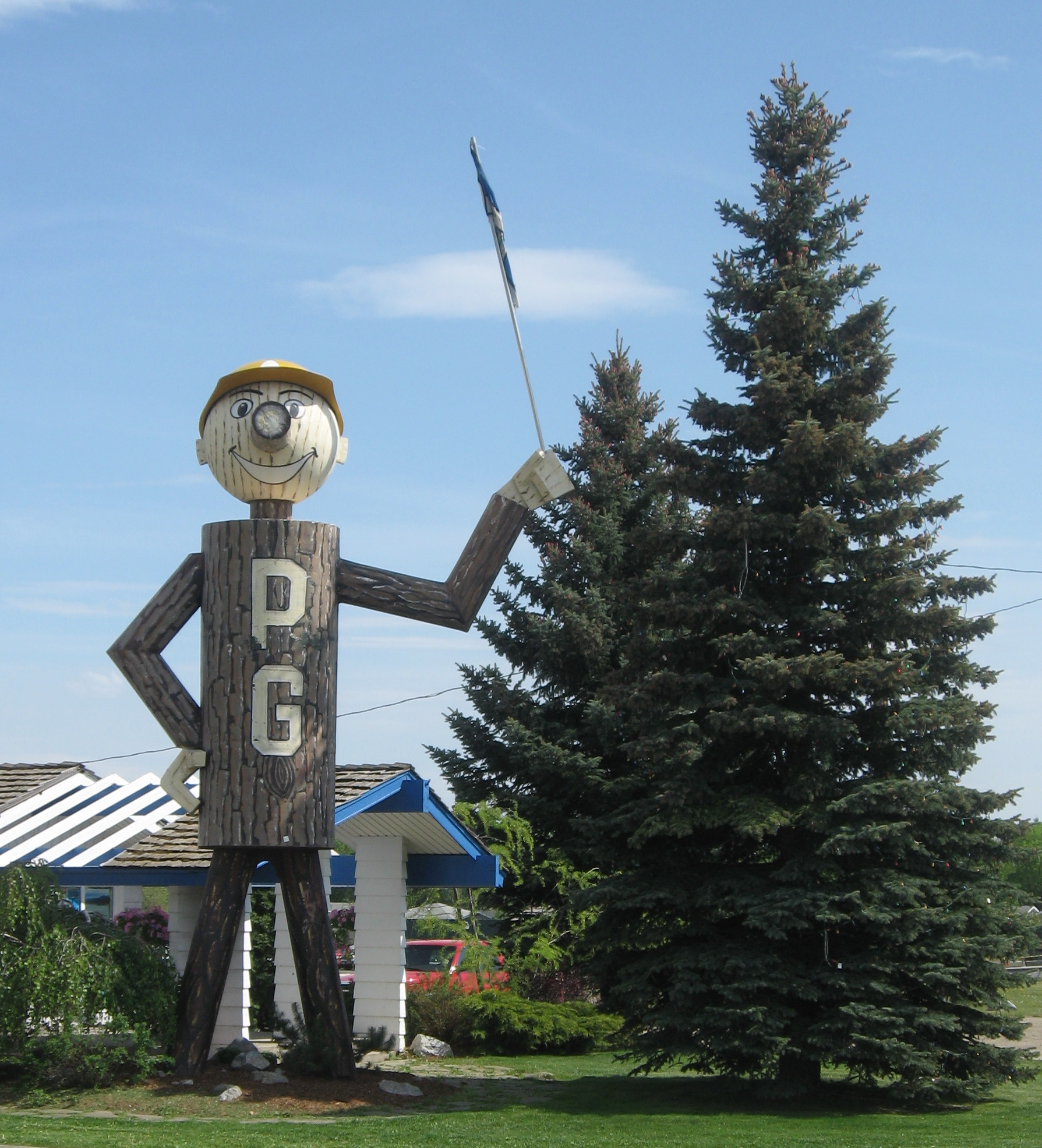
Mr. PG at the junction of Highway 97 and Highway 16

Mr. PG is a mascot for and monument in Prince George, British Columbia, Canada. He was first constructed in 1960 as a symbol of the importance of the forestry industry to the city. He currently stands at the junction of Highway 97 and Highway 16. He is 8.138 m (26.70 ft) tall and his head is 1.5 m (4 ft 11 in) in diameter. The original was constructed out of wood but the current replacement is made mostly of painted metal. For both versions his head was, and is currently, fabricated from a spherical plastic septic tank.

Mr. PG's first appearance occurred on May 8, 1960, at a Rotary International conference taking place at the Simon Fraser Inn. Later that year, he took part in the Prince George May Day parade and could speak and bow. In 1961, he was entered in the Kelowna Regatta and the Vancouver PNE Parade, and also travelled to Smithers. Two years later, he appeared in the 1963 Grey Cup parade. In 1970, he was installed at his current location, the intersection of Highways 16 and 97.

Mr. PG was trademarked by the City in 1985. In 1997, children's performer Al Simmons wrote a song about him titled Mr. PG. In 2009, Canada Post featured him on a stamp.

Despite his forest industry roots, Mr. PG echoes a resounding commitment to supporting a brighter tomorrow through various initiatives, proudly showcased through his distinctive clothing and fluttering flags.

In April 2020, he flew a flag emblazoned with a red heart as part of a community support initiative during the coronavirus pandemic in the province.
