= Lheidli Tʼenneh Band =

First Nations band government in British Columbia, Canada

Lheidli Tʼenneh
- Band No. 611
- People: Dakelh
- Headquarters: Prince George
- Province: British Columbia

Land
- Main reserve: Fort George 2
- Reserves: Fort George Cemetery 1A; Clesbaoneecheck 3; Salaquo 4
- Land area: 6.755 km^{2} (2.608 sq mi)

Population (2025)
- On reserve: 94
- On other land: 5
- Off reserve: 829
- Total population: 928

Government
- Chief: Dolleen Logan
- Council: 2025-2027 Council: Jamie Bird; Dominic Frederick; Crystal Gibbs; Kyle McIntosh; Doug Olson; Clayton Pountney; Miranda Seymour; Tasheena Seymour

Website
- www.lheidli.ca

Lheidli Tʼenneh Band also known as the Lheidli Tʼenneh First Nation and historically known as the Fort George Indian Band is the First Nations band government for the Lheidli Tʼenneh, a subgroup of the Dakelh people whose traditional territory includes the City of Prince George, British Columbia. The name means "The People from the confluence of the two rivers" in the Carrier language referring to how the Nechako River enters the Fraser River at Prince George.

The Lheidli Tʼenneh are Carrier people. Their traditional language, now spoken only by a few people, is a dialect of the Carrier language. The Lheidli Tʼenneh did not have permanent settlements in what is modern day Prince George until the arrival of the HBC post Fort George. Temporary and seasonal settlements were used across the traditional territory and archeological evidence of fishing camps along the Nechako and Fraser rivers as well as the Beaverly area.

== 19th and 20th centuries ==
=== HBC Trading Post ===
The Northwest Company established a trading post near the confluence of the Nechako and Fraser rivers in the early 1820s. The Northwest Company was absorbed into the Hudson's Bay Company (HBC) in 1821. First Nations in the area were expected to bring furs to the post in exchange for goods. This original post was closed in 1824 but rebuilt in 1829 further down the Fraser river. The HBC Fort George Trading post was part of a series of HBC posts in the north.

First Nations who traded with the HBC post soon developed a permanent settlement close to Fort George trading post along the Fraser river towards the confluence. In 1839 a census of the Lheidli village recorded 75 men, 50 women and 62 children for a total of 187. in 1883 the Fort George Indian Reserve was established, the footprint of which would later become the land wanted and acquired by the Grand Trunk pacific Railway to build its Prince George townsite. The Fort George Reserve No.1 encompassed 1366 acres. Three other reserve sites were also surveyed around the region. The land was considered to be agriculturally worthless and remote enough to not interfere the development. Census in the 1890s there were 29 houses with 124 residents in the village. People living in the village relied on hunting, fishing, and trapping and had also cultivated garden patches as trade with the HBC post diminished.

Roman Catholic priests and Oblate missionaries from other posts in the region visited the Lheidli Tʼenneh often.

=== Acquisition of Reserve No.1 by the Railway ===
In 1908, the Grand Trunk Pacific Railway (GTP) identified the Reserve No.1 land as an ideal area for a railway and station site, and attempted to claim that all of the 1366 acres was needed for railway purposes, and thus circumvent negotiations with the Department of Indian Affairs. This was rejected. The Department of Indian Affairs wished to protect the Lheidli Tʼenneh's interests but also supported railway development. By 1910, the DIA agent in the area was concerned about the influence of white settlers on the Lheidli Tʼenneh, including the supply of liquor to the village and that "civilization has overtaken them too rapidly" DIA Indian Agent John McDougall however saw that the Lheidli Tʼenneh had come to see the value of the land and employed that in negotiations.

Between 1908 and 1911, several offers for the acquisition of the Reserve No.1 lands were made by the GTP and others such as Charles Millar (of BC Express) who wanted to develop the land. The Department of Indian Affairs in conjunction with railroad representatives made several offers for the land. In 1910, Chief Louis described the attachment to the land and village to McDougall, who reported that "Land, Cash, and farm equipment" would be needed to overcome resistance, and the band was considered to be averse to a sale. McDougall met with Chief Louis again in December 1910 offering CA$68,300 (equivalent to $1,947,599 in 2025) (CA$50 (equivalent to $1,426 in 2025)/acre) but Chief Louis told McDougall that "they could not in their present mind surrender this reserve". A vote was held at a meeting two days later with members of the Band over age 21. the vote approved the surrender of the reserve land 12–11, but Chief Louis asked to talk with his people and the Band did not consider the vote final. The Band appointed Oblate Missionary E.C Bellot as an emissary to Ottawa with a larger cash demand of $1000 per acre, which was refused by DIA representatives. Upon return to Fort George, a new vote by the Band unanimously turned down the sale. During this time, the business developers of Fort George Townsite opposed the sale of the reserve lands as it would lead to its rival building a competing town while South Fort George, which was built close to the old HBC Post and the village, welcomed the railway and its townsite.

In 1911, federal Indian agent W.J. MacAllan took on the negotiations with assistance from Reverend Father Coccola. Father Coccola conflicted role as he had interests in the well-being of the Lheidli Tʼenneh but was also negotiating on behalf of the railway company which might connect to his mission on Stuart Lake. Father Coccola had wanted to relocated the Lheidli Tʼenneh to a safer area where they would be away from settlers and could be schooled in agriculture and in religion. Coccola suggested to the band that "if it tolerated intoxicating liquor and moral disorders, he would be the first to insist to have them removed". Coccola made several statements that he would convince or persuade the Band to relocate if they refused offers, and even involved himself in pricing amounts that could be offers to the Lheidli Tʼenneh. With several offers and refusals, the Lheidli Tʼenneh saw a split in support for a land sale. Chief Louis favored the surrender of the land, but Joseph Quah, an influential leader in the Band, wanted a higher price.

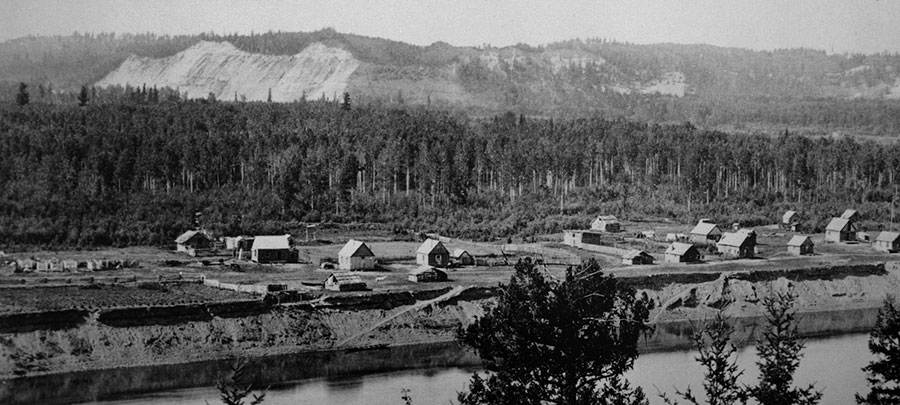
Lheidli T'enneh Village - Early 20th Century before the Band was reloacated to Shelley Reserve. This Village was burned in 1913. The HBC post would be to the left, out of the photo.

On November 18, 1911, Fort George Indian Band agreed to sell the Reserve No.1 lands for CA$125,000 (equivalent to $3,722,478 in 2025) (one quarter to be paid immediately) which included $25,000 for construction on reserve No.2 and No.3 and the preservation of the original village cemetery. The band committed to relocate by June 1912. The vote for this agreement saw 32 in favor and one against, and three abstentions. The timeline was difficult to keep as new buildings had to be constructed. Delays in contracts being awarded by the government to build a new village meant that few could move by the deadline and Band members planted crops needed later in the year. The June 1912 payment was withheld as the DIA saw the planting as refusal to leave. Chief Louis argued that the agreement stated that the payment was to be made in June and was not contingent on relocation. Winter was also coming and the crops would be needed if the new village was not built or supplies given to the Band.

The new village was completed in 1913 with Band members moving there in September. The old village was destroyed "to force the Indians away" and ensure that it was not reoccupied. The Fort George Herald reported the destruction of the old village as "the torch of the white man will be thrust into the remaining houses and the village will disappear quietly in a cloud of smoke". Indian Agent W. J. MacAllan's accounts of the situation reveal a need on his part and the part of the GTP to strong arm the bandmembers out, targeting two cabins in the village that were empty as the residents were away hinting "I knew that to set fire to the cabins would cause a flare up of intense excitement and give me the break I needed, for a crisis had to be created before the deadlock could be broken".

The site of Reserve No.2 (Shelley) was much further away from the new Prince George townsite and other communities. The land was not particularly fertile for agriculture and the Band suffered economically. The site of the old village and the HBC post would become Fort George Park. The cemetery would become Reserve No.1A.

== 21st century ==
There are over 700 members of Lheidli Tʼenneh First Nation. Many also live off the reserve.

=== The Lheidli Tʼenneh Treaty ===
On October 29, 2006, the Lheidli Tʼenneh became the first people to initiate a treaty with British Columbia and Canada within the framework of the British Columbia Treaty Process created in response to the Delgamuukw case. It remains for the treaty to be ratified by a vote of Lheidli Tʼenneh band members, by the Legislative Assembly of British Columbia, and by the Canadian Parliament.

On February 9, 2007, the Treaty 8 First Nations launched a legal challenge of the ratification of Lheidli Tʼenneh treaty. The Treaty 8 First Nations asserted that Canada, British Columbia and the Lheidli Tʼenneh did not adequately consult them about the overlap of the Lheidli Tʼenneh treaty area and the area of Treaty 8.

The Treaty 8 First Nations sought an interlocutory injunction preventing the ratification of the treaty until such time as the parties resolves the issues of the overlap. Justice Wilson of the Supreme Court of British Columbia denied the plaintiff's application for an interlocutory injunction.

A similar challenge was launched by Secwepemc Nation on March 12, 2007.

The Lheidli Tʼenneh band members did not ratify the treaty in a treaty ratification vote held on March 30, 2007. In the vote, 123 people voted against the treaty and 111 voted in favour of it.

In response to this outcome, the British Columbia Treaty Commission undertook a "Lheidli Tʼenneh Communications Probe" to determine why the treaty was not ratified. This included a survey carried out by the Mustel Group, a marketing and public opinion research firm based in Vancouver.

The Lheidli Tʼenneh nation is currently preparing for another ratification vote.

=== Canada Winter Games ===
The City of Prince George, as part of its 100th anniversary celebrations, hosted the 2015 Canada Winter Games. The Lheidli Tʼenneh were the Official Host First Nation, the first time the Games acknowledged a First Nations as a formal partner.

=== Fort George Park renaming ===
In 2015, Prince George City Council voted in favor of renaming Fort George Park, which is the location of the original HBC post and Lheidli Tʼenneh village, to Lheidli Tʼenneh Memorial Park.

In 2017, 11 human remains were found in an area of the park being developed for a new shelter. The area where remains were found is outside the fence line of the established Cemetery (reserve No.1A), but the fence line of the cemetery is disputed, and remains are likely to be found in a large area around the Cemetery.

=== Treaty debate ===
In June 2018, Lheidli Tʼenneh First Nation voted against a proposed treaty with the federal and provincial governments, which would have granted self-governance powers.

=== Pipeline explosion ===
The Lheidli Tʼenneh First Nation was affected by an explosion on the Enbridge BC Pipeline in October 2018. The explosion forced about 100 members of the Band to evacuate their homes, even though nobody was hurt in the explosion, and no property was damaged apart from the pipeline itself. In 2019, Lheidli Tʼenneh First Nation filed a lawsuit seeking a permanent injunction which would prevent Enbridge from operating the pipeline in their territory and reserves, and require the company to dismantle the pipeline and restore the affected lands to their natural state.

=== Potlatch (Balhats) ===
In November 2019, the Lheidli Tʼenneh hosted their first potlatch (Balhat) in 73 years. Potlaches had previously been outlawed by the Canadian government.

== Notable members ==
- Kym Gouchie
- Marcel Gagnon
- Mary Gouchie
- Barry Seymour
