= Al Simmons (musician) =

Canadian musician (born 1948)

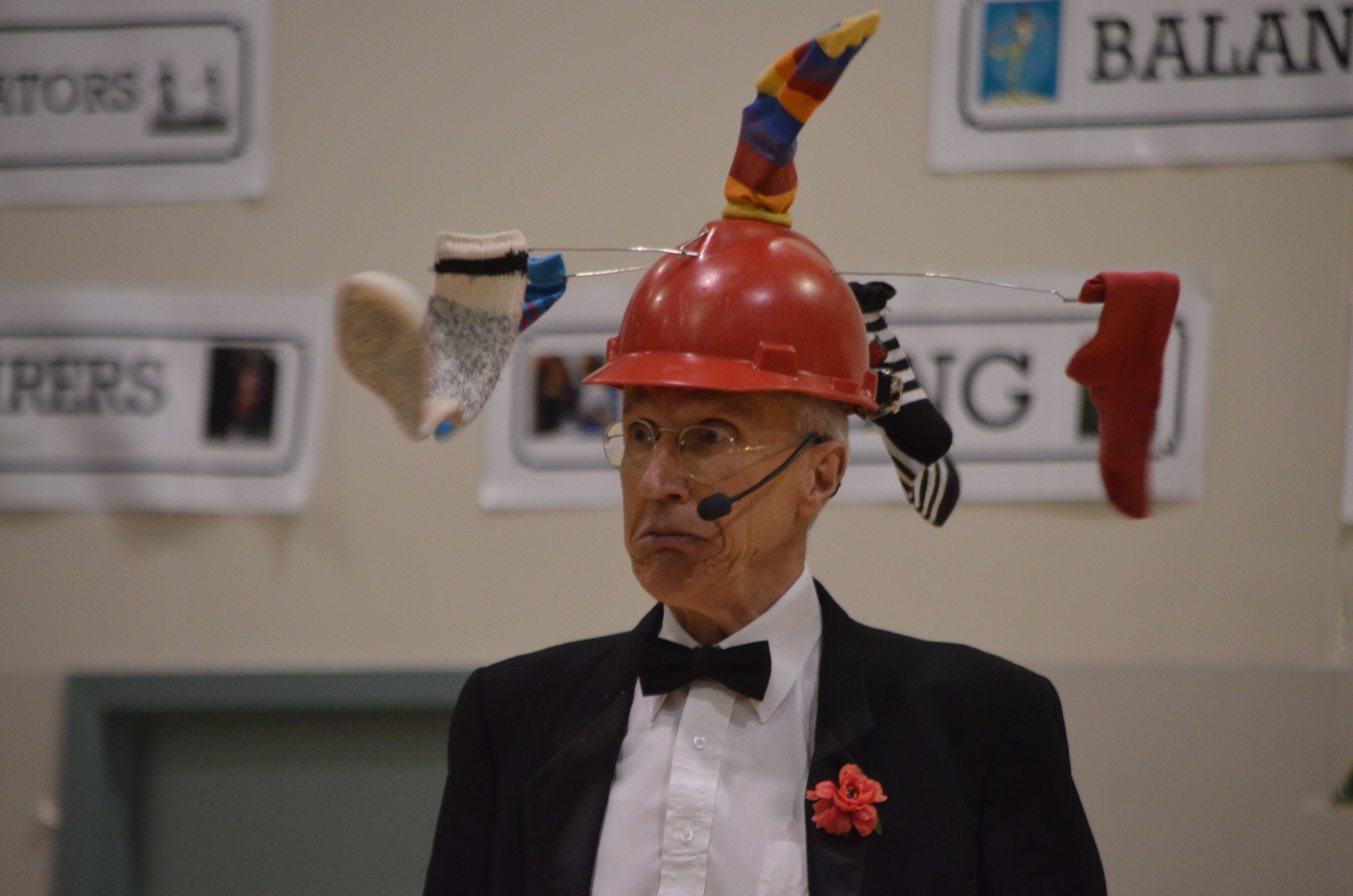
- Simmons in 2013
- Born: Albert William Simmons; September 5, 1948 (age 77); Anola, Manitoba, Canada
- Occupation: Children's performer
- Spouse: Barbara Freundl (m. 1976)
- Children: 3
- Awards: Order of Manitoba

Albert William "Al" Simmons, OM (born September 5, 1948) is a Canadian children's performer from Anola, Manitoba. He began performing in 1970. Al and his wife Barb starred in a television series on CTV, in the early 1980s, called “All For Fun,” and later made guest appearances on Fred Penner's television show as well as Sesame Street. He tours regularly across Canada and the United States, and as far away as Singapore, Hong Kong, Japan, and Australia. He has recorded several albums for children and won a Juno Award in 1996, and a Western Canada Music Award in 2025

Simmons worked as a gas jockey, steelworker, and clerk before becoming an entertainer. He started performing in amateur shows and volunteering his services for benefit concerts. He formed a comedy/rock band called Out to Lunch and then a comedy/folk band, Kornstalk, before venturing out on his own again as a musician and prop comic. His first solo act was the Human Juke Box: "two bits a laff."

Simmons has released four CDs, Something's Fishy at Camp Wiganishie, Celery Stalks at Midnight, The Truck I Bought From Moe, each of which won Parents' Choice honours and were nominated for Juno awards. The Whistling Egg Man won a Western Canada Music award in 2025, and Celery Stalks, an ode to vaudeville, won the 1996 Juno Award for Best Children's Album. His illustrated children's book Counting Feathers was short-listed for the McNally-Robinson Book of the Year in 1997. He received a Cable Ace Award nomination for his music video "I Collect Rocks," which is also the title track of his DVD. He also voiced the Genie Award-winning 1985 animated short, Get a Job.

In 1997, he wrote a song about Prince George, British Columbia mascot Mr. PG.

Simmons married Barbara Freundl in 1976. They have three sons, Karl, Will, and Brad; and six granddaughters, Ashley, Katie, Marley, Clover, and Penny.
