= Prince George, British Columbia =

City in British Columbia, Canada

Prince George
- City
- City of Prince George
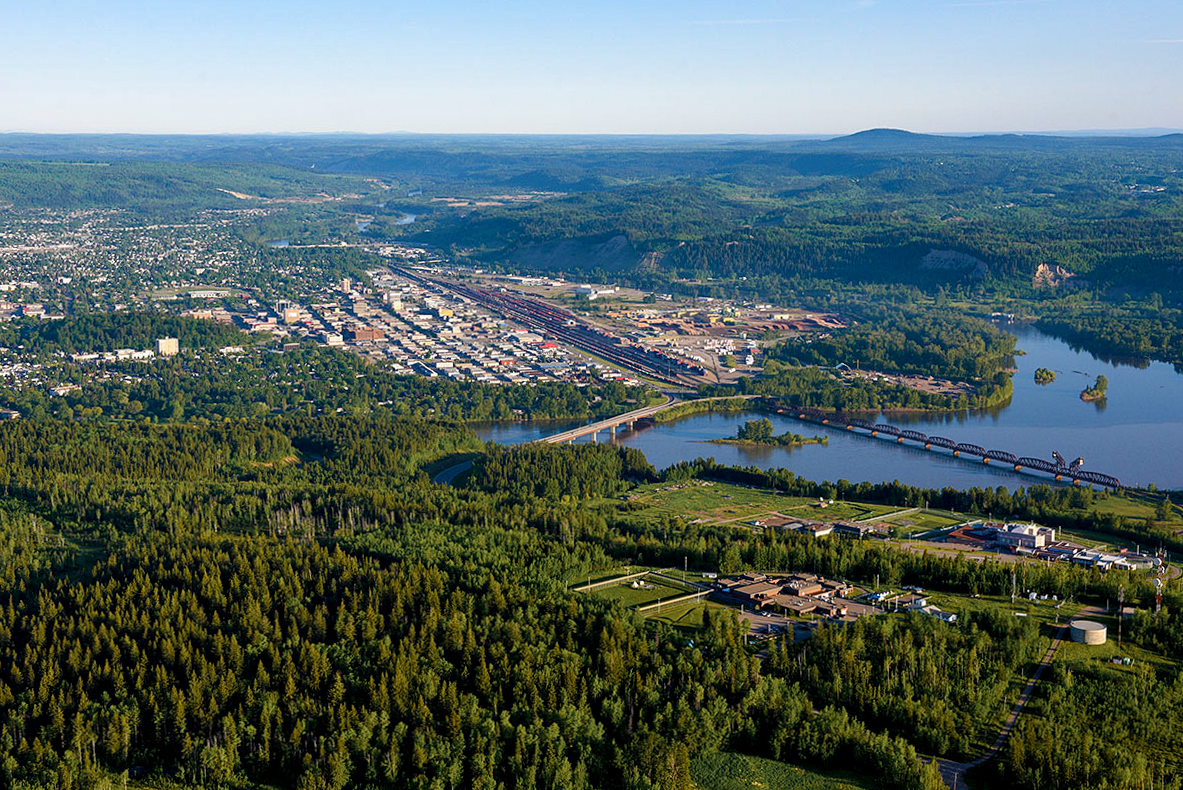
- An aerial view of Prince George

- Flag Logo
- Motto: "Shaping a Northern Destiny"
- Location of Prince George Prince George (Canada) Prince George (North America)
- Coordinates: 53°54′47″N 122°44′43″W
- Country: Canada
- Province: British Columbia
- Regional district: Fraser–Fort George
- Established: 1807
- Incorporated: March 6, 1915

Government
  - Mayor: Garth Frizzell
  - Governing body: Prince George City Council
  - MPs: Todd Doherty (CPC); Bob Zimmer (CPC)
  - MLAs: Rosalyn Bird (BCC); Sheldon Clare (BCC); Kiel Giddens (BCC)

Area
  - City: 318.26 km^{2} (122.88 sq mi)
  - Urban: 73.9 km^{2} (28.5 sq mi)
- Elevation: 575 m (1,886 ft)

Population (2021)
  - City: 76,708
  - Density: 242.2/km^{2} (627/sq mi)
  - Urban: 67,339
  - Metro: 89,490
- Time zone: UTC−07:00 (Pacific Time)
- Forward sortation area: V2K – V2N
- Area codes: 250, 778, 236, 672
- Website: princegeorge.ca

Prince George is a city in British Columbia, Canada, situated at the confluence of the Fraser and Nechako rivers. The city itself has a population of 76,708; the metro census agglomeration has a population of 89,490. It is often called the province's "northern capital" because it serves as a centre for higher education, health care, government services, arts and entertainment, sports, and support for major industries such as forest products and mining.

== History ==
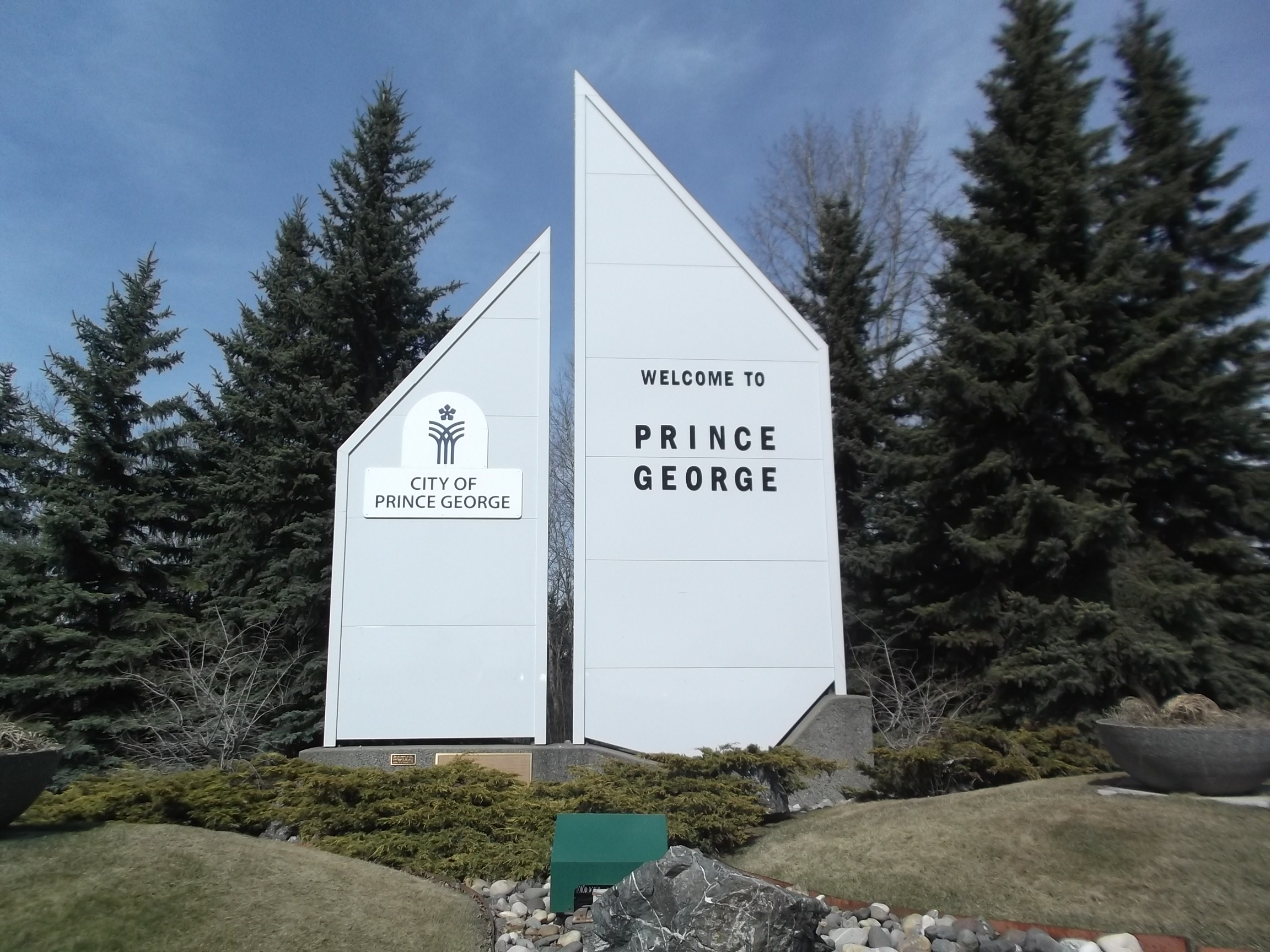
Prince George's welcome sign

The origins of Prince George can be traced to the North West Company fur trading post of Fort George, which was established in 1807 by Simon Fraser and named in honour of King George III. The post was centred in the centuries-old homeland of the Lheidli T'enneh First Nation, whose name means "people of the confluence of the two rivers." The Lheidli T'enneh name began to see official use around the 1990s and the band is otherwise historically referred to as Fort George Indian Band.

=== 1800s ===
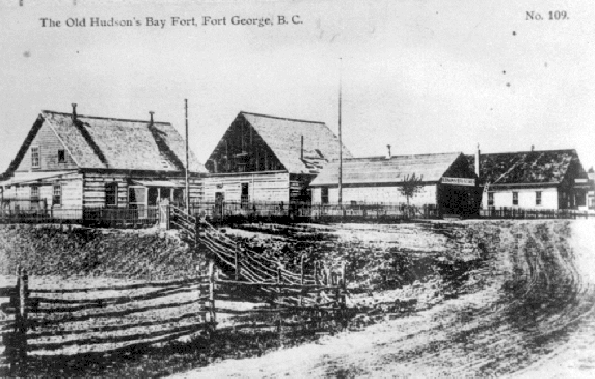
Fort George trading post (1880)

Throughout the 19th century, HBC Fort George trading post remained unchanged, and Fort St. James reigned as the main trading post and capital of the New Caledonia area. Even during the Cariboo Gold Rush, Fort George was isolated from the newfound trade. Then, when the Collins Overland Telegraph Trail was built in 1865–67, it bypassed Fort George trading post, following the Blackwater Trail from Quesnel and continuing northwest towards Hazelton. In the late 1800s many Lheidli T'enneh lived in a village built next to the HBC trading post due to the ease of preparing furs and trading directly, without great distances to travel.

=== Townsite development and the Grand Trunk Pacific Railway ===
In 1903, the area's fortune began to change when reports said that the Grand Trunk Pacific Railway (later part of Canadian National Railway) would pass near the fur trading post. In 1906, agricultural settlement began around the HBC post and then in 1909, development of two townsites began as two rival land speculation companies built the communities of South Fort George and Fort George (sometimes referred to as Central Fort George). South Fort George was built on the Fraser River near to and just south of the Hudson's Bay Company's trading post. The GTP meanwhile was trying to acquire land for its own townsite which delayed the constructions of what would become Prince George for several years.

==== Fort George townsite ====
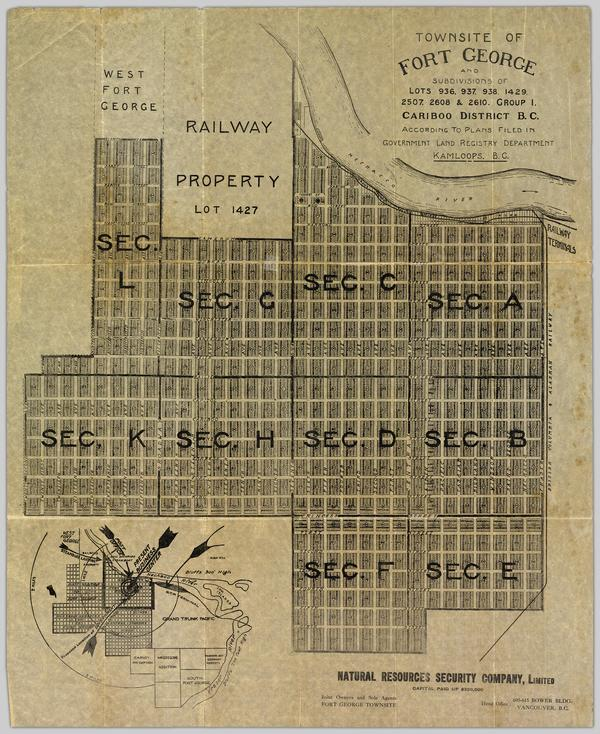
Plan of the Fort George townsite

Fort George townsite was built 3.2 km (2 mi) to the northwest on the Nechako River. The name had been registered by the district lot original purchasers with some concerns due to its similarity to the HBC trading post's name. George Hammond, the CEO of the Natural Resources Security Company, bought nine district lots and promoted his community of Fort George in exaggerated and questionable advertisements all over Canada and Britain, describing Fort George in glowing terms as being the future hub of British Columbia, the "Chicago of the north", and having mild winters and being suitable for any agricultural endeavour. Hammond claimed the existence of buildings and facilities in advertising when none existed at the time. Lots sold in 1912 for $400, rising to $500-$1,000 by 1913.

Ten paddle steamer sternwheelers serviced the area, coming up on the Fraser River from Soda Creek docking at both South Fort George and Fort George Townsite.

==== South Fort George ====
South Fort George developed close to the near defunct HBC post, along the Fraser River after being purchased in 1909 by the Northern Development Company, with lots going on sale in 1910. BC Express Company paddle wheelers landed in South Fort George and the area grew with speculation about the railway coming to the area. South Fort George would remain its own community until 1976 when it incorporated into the City of Prince George.

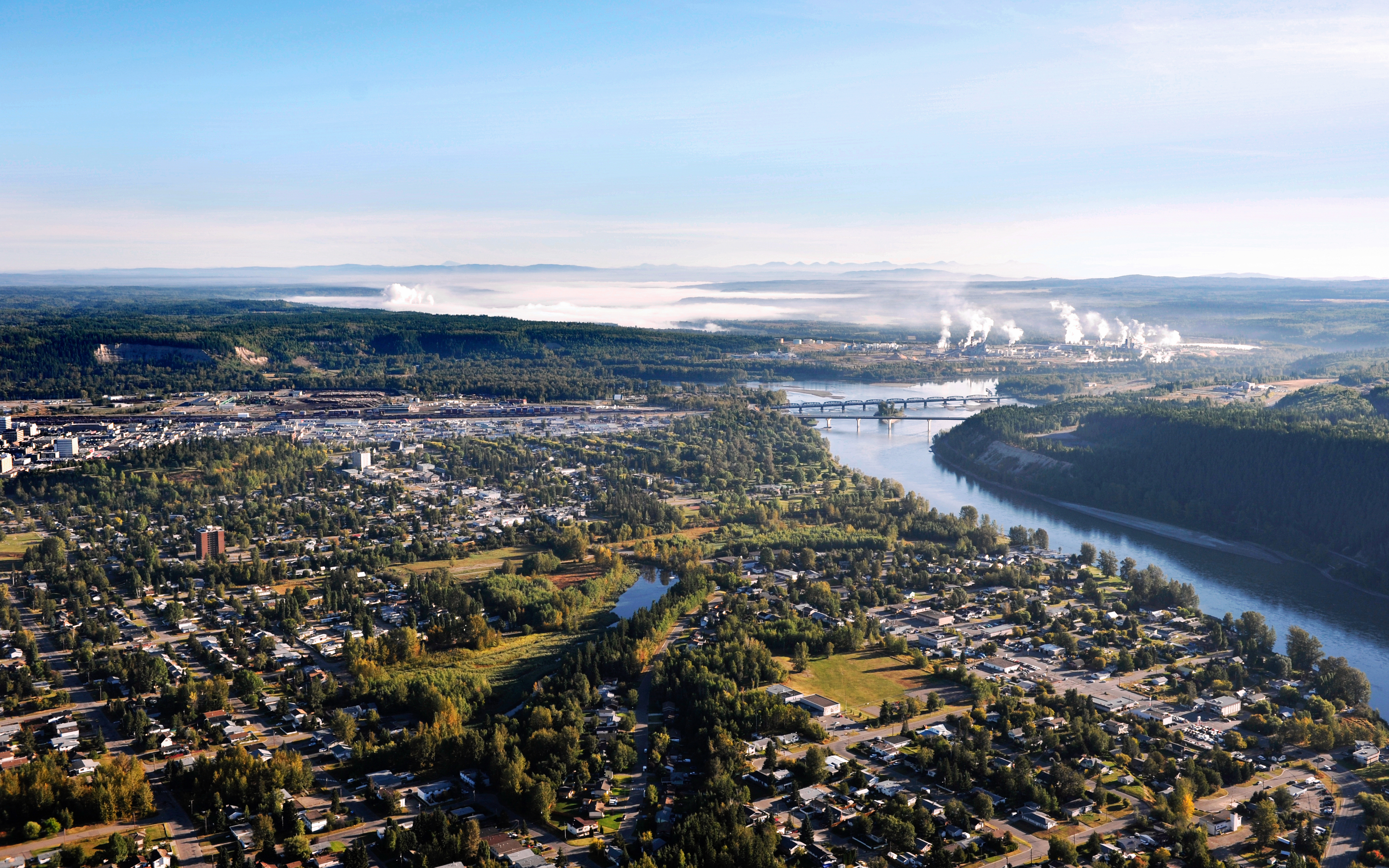
Aerial view of Prince George. South Fort George prominent in the lower right side.

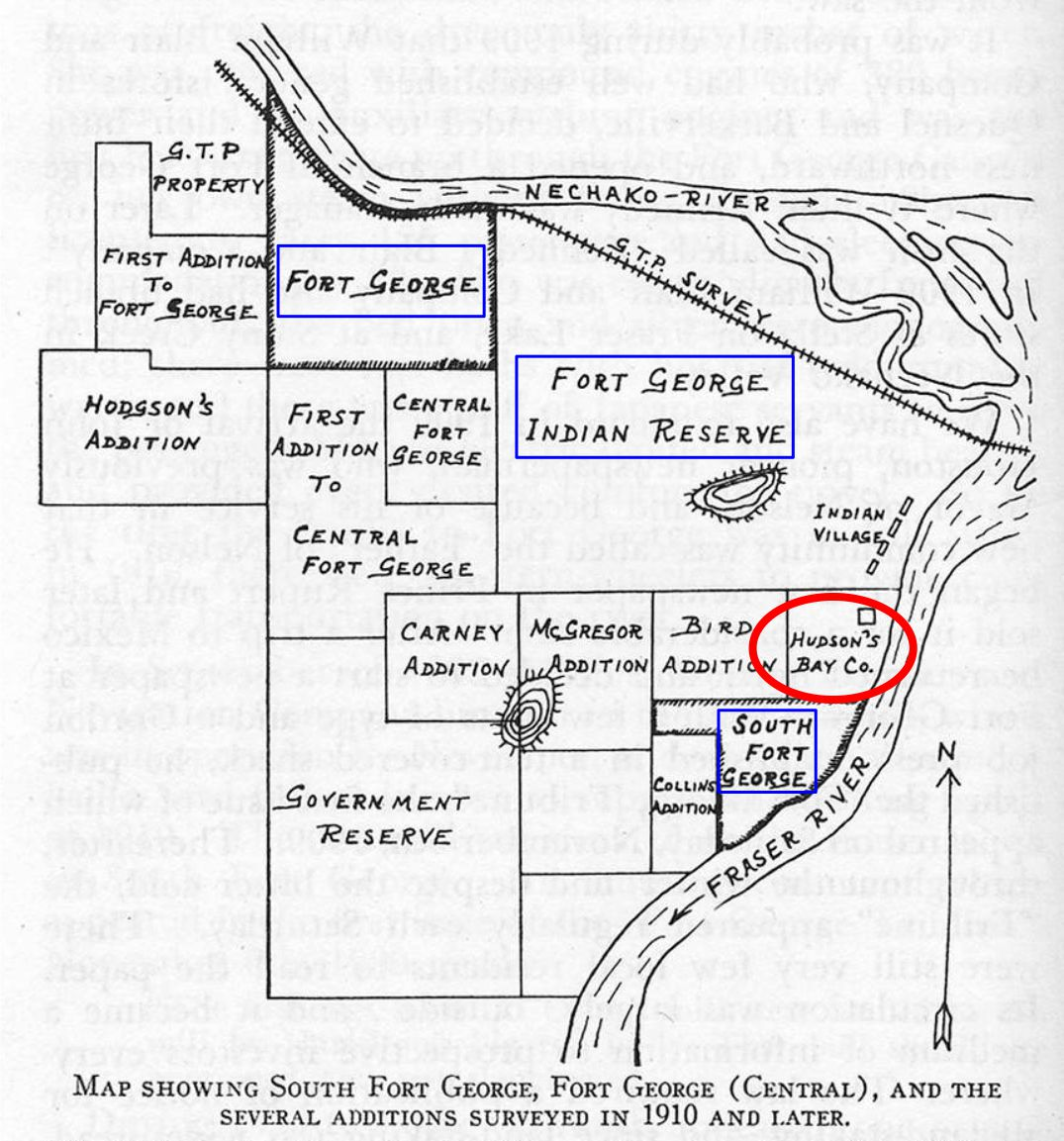
1910 map of Fort George and South Fort George.

==== Growth and creation of Prince George ====
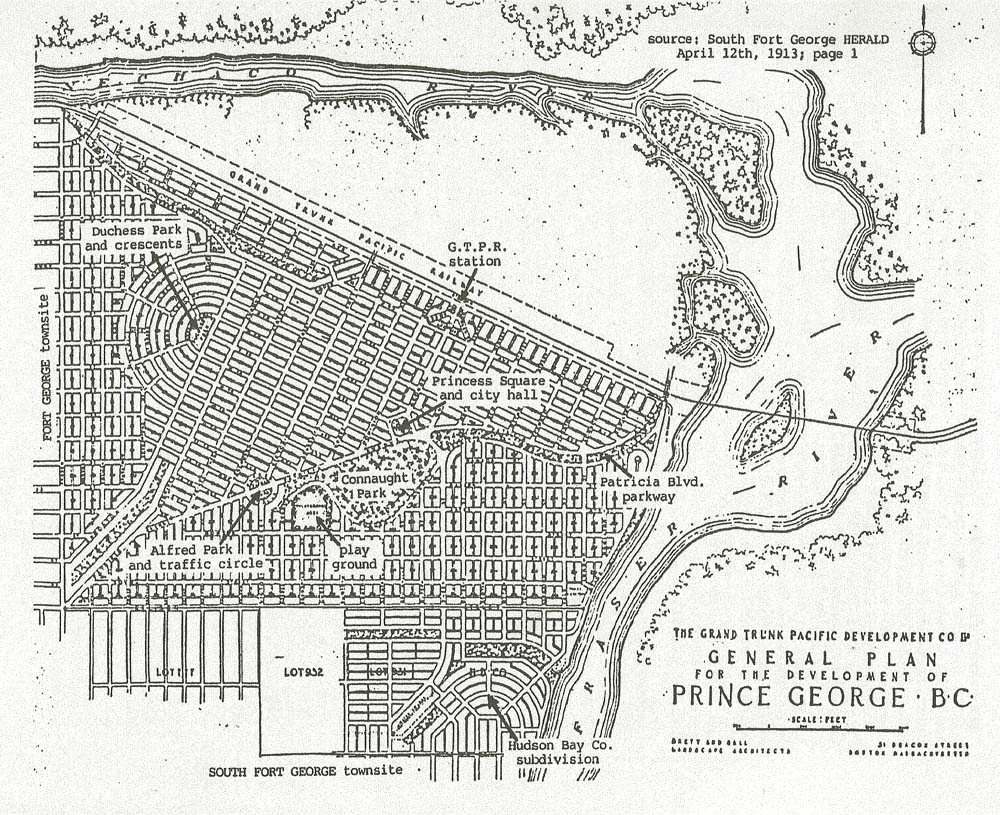
Plan of Prince George (1913)

Properties were sold in both of the townsites with railway speculation driving up prices. By 1913, South Fort George and Fort George each had a population of around 1,500 and were booming as thousands of rail construction workers came to town for supplies and entertainment. Both communities believed that the Grand Trunk Pacific station would be built in their town, and both were disappointed when the railway purchased the 553 ha (1,366 acres) of land in between them from the Lhiedli T'enneh instead, even though Charles Vance Millar, then the owner of the BC Express Company, was well into negotiations to purchase that property himself. The railway compensated Millar by giving him 81 ha (200 acres) of the property and, by 1914, when the railway was completed and the first train arrived, there were four major communities in the area: South Fort George, Fort George Townsite, the Millar Addition and the railway's townsite, Prince George, where the station was built. Hammond also developed his lots further, including additions such as Central Fort George. Although George Hammond fought a series of bitter legal battles for a railway station in Fort George. The Railway argued against a station in Fort George as it was their investment and risk, thus they would build a station in a townsite of their own (Prince George). Plans for the townsite for Prince George were created by Brett and Hall of Boston, and the land cleared in May 1913.

Fort George, South Fort George, and Prince George pursued the right to incorporate with initial proposals including all three townsites. The GTP shows no interest in including Fort George, and South Fort George left the negotiations. The GTP lands now known as the City of Prince George were incorporated on March 6, 1915, following the borders of the 1,366 acres they had initially acquired. At this time, many owners of Prince George businesses, particularly ones on George Street, lived in South Fort George. As the Prince George townsite developed and grew, many buildings were moved from the older townsites to the new business areas of Prince George, often being rolled into the city.

==== Lheidli T'enneh Village and the railway ====
In 1908, the Grand Trunk Pacific Railway identified the Reserve No.1 land as an ideal area for a railway and station site, and attempted to claim all the 1366 acres as needed for railway purposes. This was rejected due to the Department of Indian Affairs. The Department of Indian Affairs wished to protect the Lheidli T'enneh's interests but also supported railway development.

Between 1908 and 1911 several offers for the acquisition of the Reserve No.1 lands were made by the GTP and others such as Charles Millar (of BC Express) who wanted to develop the land. The Department of Indian Affairs in conjunction with railroad representatives made several offers for the land. In 1910 Chief Louis described the attachment to the land and village to McDougall, who reported that "Land, Cash, and farm equipment" would be needed to overcome resistance, and the band was considered to be averse to a sale. McDougall met with Chief Louis again in December 1910 offering $68,300 ($50/acre) but Chief Louis told McDougall that "they could not in their present mind surrender this reserve". A vote was held at a meeting two days later with members of the Band over age 21. The vote approved the surrender of the reserve land 12–11, but Chief Louis asked to talk with his people and the Band did not consider the vote final. The Band appointed Oblate Missionary E.C Bellot as an emissary to Ottawa with a larger cash demand of $1000 per acre, which was refused by DIA representatives. Upon return to Fort George, a new vote by the Band unanimously turned down the sale. During this time, the business developers of Fort George Townsite opposed the sale of the reserve lands as it would lead to its rival building a competing town while South Fort George, which was built close to the old HBC Post and the village, welcomed the railway and its townsite.

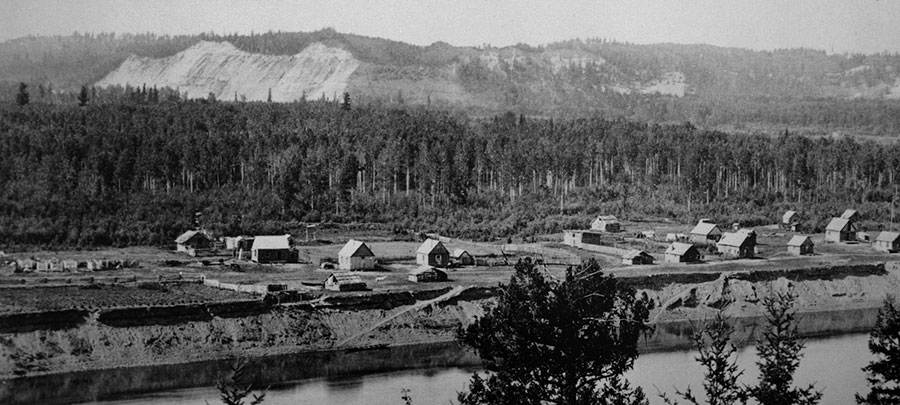
The Lheidli T'enneh village in 1910. This is now Lheidli T'enneh Memorial Park.

In 1911, federal Indian agent W.J. MacAllan took on the negotiations with assistance from Nicolas Coccola, a reverend. Coccola had interests in the well-being of the Lheidli T'enneh but was also negotiating on behalf of the railway company which might connect to his mission on Stuart Lake. Father Coccola had wanted to relocated the Lheidli T'enneh to a safer area where they would be away from settlers and could be schooled in agriculture and in religion. Coccola suggested to the band that "if it tolerated intoxicating liquor and moral disorders, he would be the first to insist to have them removed". Coccola made several statements that he would convince or persuade the Band to relocate if they refused offers, and even involved himself in pricing amounts that could be offers to the Lheidli T'enneh. With several offers and refusals, the Lheidli T'enneh saw a split in support for a land sale. Chief Louis favoured the surrender of the land, but Joseph Quah, an influential leader in the Band, wanted a higher price.

On November 18, 1911, The Fort George Indian Band eventually agreed to sell the Reserve No.1 lands for $125,000 (one quarter to be paid immediately) which included $25,000 for construction on reserve No.2 and No.3 and the preservation of the original village cemetery. The band committed to relocate by June 1912. The vote for this agreement saw 32 in favour and one against, and three abstentions. The timeline was difficult to keep as new buildings had to be constructed. Delays in contracts being awarded by the government to build a new village meant that few could move by the deadline and Band members planted crops needed later in the year. The June 1912 payment was withheld as the DIA saw the planting as refusal to leave. Chief Louis argued that the agreement stated that the payment was to be made in June and was not contingent on relocation. Winter was also coming and the crops would be needed if the new village was not built or supplies given to the Band.

The new village was completed in 1913 with Band members moving there in September. The old village was destroyed "to force the Indians away" and ensure that it was not reoccupied. The Fort George Herald reported the destruction of the old village as "the torch of the white man will be thrust into the remaining houses and the village will disappear quietly in a cloud of smoke". Indian Agent W. J. MacAllan's accounts of the situation reveal a need on his part and the part of the GTP to strong-arm the band members out, targeting two cabins in the village that were empty as the residents were away hunting "I knew that to set fire to the cabins would cause a flare up of intense excitement and give me the break I needed, for a crisis had to be created before the deadlock could be broken".

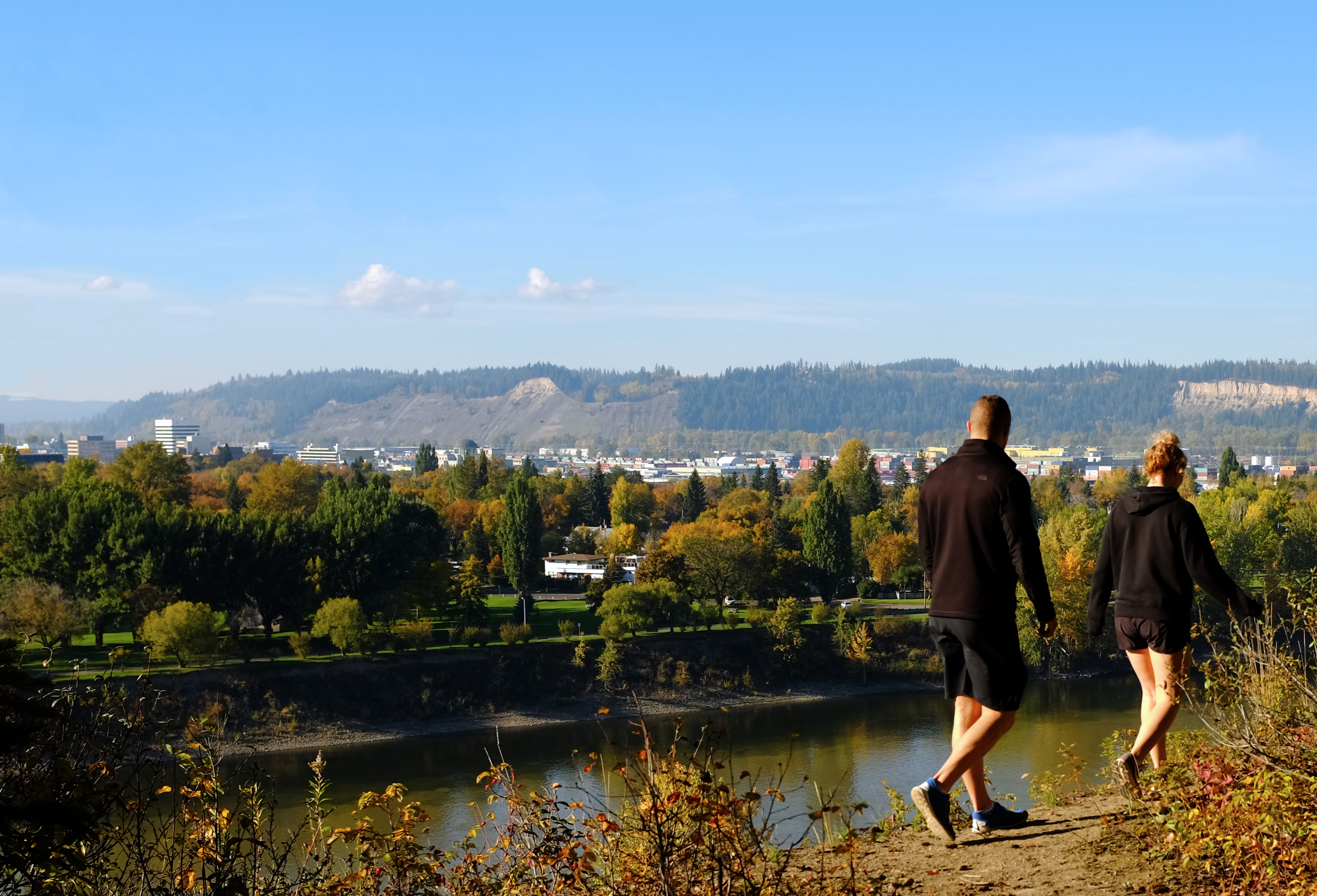
City view from LC Gunn Park. Lheidli T'enneh Memorial Park is seen across the river.

The site of Reserve No.2 (Shelley) was much further away from the new Prince George townsite and other communities. The land was not particularly fertile for agriculture and the Band suffered economically. The site of the old village and the HBC post would become Fort George Park (renamed Lheidli T'enneh Memorial Park in 2015). The Cemetery would become Reserve No.1A.

=== Etymology ===
There were three rationales given for naming the new city as Prince George:

- In 1911, Grand Trunk Railway documents justified the name to clearly distinguish it from nearby Fort George neighbourhoods.
- In 1914, the railway said that the name would honour the recently crowned King George V. One suggestion recommended the name George.
- A third rationale was to honour Prince George, Duke of Kent, the fourth son of reigning King George V.

Businessmen in Fort George petitioned the provincial government to block the new name but they were unsuccessful. In May 1915, residents voted by plebiscite to name the new city as Prince George with a vote of 153–13.

=== First World War ===
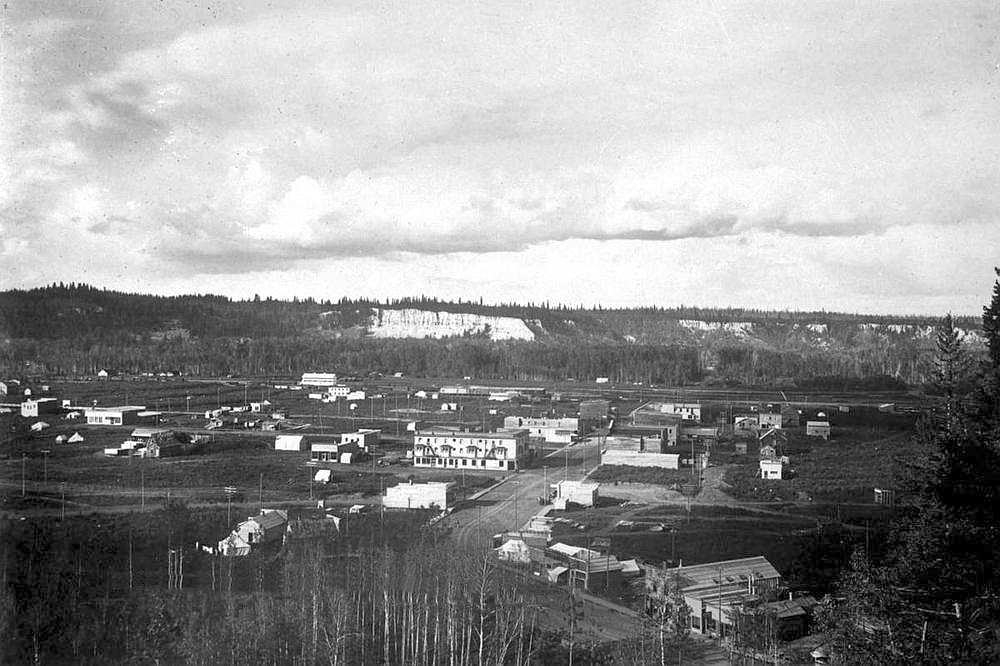
Prince George (1914). The large building in the centre is the PG Hotel.

With the onset of World War I in 1914, the local economy was devastated as many local men enlisted and the construction of the Pacific Great Eastern Railway was halted, creating a massive drop in population. Many men enlisted in Prince George from the surrounding communities and were primarily sent to Vernon, BC for training before being shipped overseas. 17 names of soldiers who died in World War I are inscribed on the cenotaph, although many more enlisted. Population decline continued with the ensuing Spanish flu epidemic of 1918. The epidemic took at least fifty lives in the area, including First Nations leaders.

=== 1920s and 1930s ===
Prince George persevered through the 1920s and the Great Depression of the 1930s and did not experience any significant growth until World War II when an army camp was built at the foot of Cranbrook Hill, bringing new life to the struggling businesses and service industries. The Great Depression saw massive decline in lumber production in the region, falling from 105 million board feet in 1929 to only 15 million board feet by 1932 and a significant increase in unemployment. Unemployed men were often housed in one of several relief camps east of Prince George, where the men worked on construction projects or remained idle; away from the city of Prince George. Between 1930 and 1935, Prince George and the work camps were home to labor protests and sit ins organized by a local branch of the Communist sympathizing National Unemployed Workers Association, who sought basic needs for the unemployed.

In the 1920s air transport began with sea planes and landing on Central Avenue. In the 1930s Prince George saw air transport increase and became a hub for air mail to Takla Landing, Fort St. James, and Mansons Landing, later including stops in Edmonton, Whitehorse, and Fort Nelson and an airport was developed by Carney Hill (The Golf Course today). In 1939, Prince George was selected as a spot for an aerodrome, and construction began on what is now Prince George Airport.

=== Second World War ===
Army Camp Prince George was opened during WWII and once housed 6,000 soldiers. From March 1942 to October 1943, divisional troops and units of the 16th Infantry Brigade (8th Canadian Infantry Division) were housed there. The camp was located in the area of 1st Street, Central Street, 15th Avenue, to the bottom of Cranbrook Hill. Barracks were built to house the soldiers, dining halls constructed to feed them, and wet canteens for their leisure and entertainment. There were rifle ranges, mortar ranges and artillery ranges. The camp closed at the end of the war. Most of the buildings were either demolished or moved to new locations, although some remain in their original locations, such as the former transportation building on 15th Avenue, that was used by the British Columbia Forestry Service from the late 1940s to 1963. It is now owned by the City of Prince George for use by the Community Arts Council. The Nechako Bottle Depot on First Avenue is also another former camp building. Others include the first Overwaitea store, at Victoria and Third, formerly a barracks and the original civic centre, which was the old drill shed, was removed and rebuilt on Seventh Avenue. Population during the war saw 2,027 in 1941 rising to 3,800 in Prince George by 1945.

After the war, as the ravaged European cities rebuilt, the demand for lumber skyrocketed and Prince George, with its abundance of sawmills and spruce trees, prospered. Finally, in 1952, after 40 years of construction, the Pacific Great Eastern was completed and joined with the CN line at Prince George, and with the completion of Highways 16 and 97, Prince George finally fulfilled George Hammond's long ago promise of being the hub of British Columbia.

=== Modern history ===
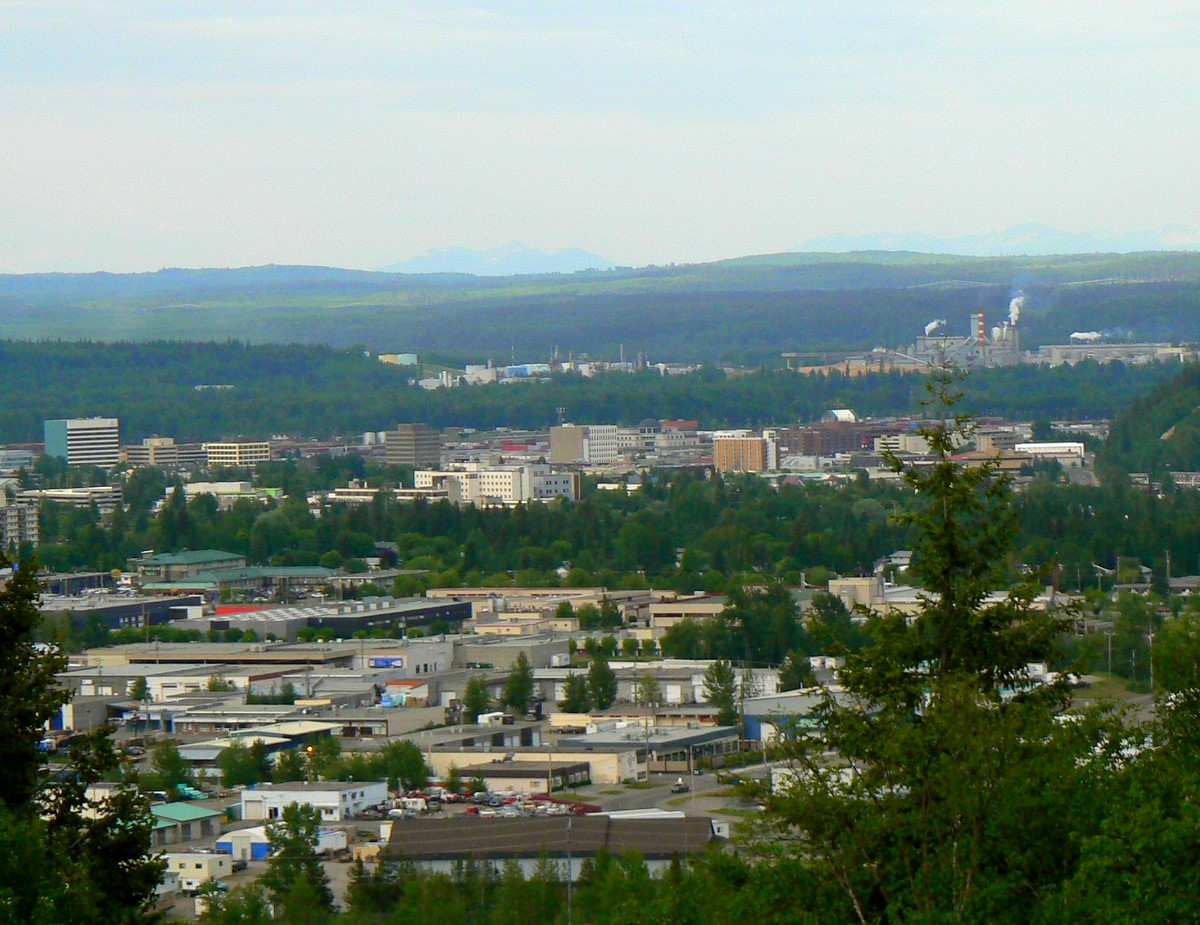
A general view from Prince George

Canadian Forces Station Baldy Hughes (ADC ID: C-20) was constructed in 1952 as a General Surveillance Radar station. It was located 35.9 km (22.3 mi) south-southwest of Prince George, and was closed in 1988. It was operated as part of the Pinetree Line network controlled by the North American Aerospace Defense Command (NORAD). Today the former station is The Baldy Hughes Addiction Treatment Centre. The original radar system has been removed and the location now operates a weather station and Nav Canada system.

In 1953, (Central) Fort George Townsite incorporated into the City of Prince George.

On June 25, 1956, at just after 7 p.m., a Lockheed P-38 Lightning fighter plane built in 1943 (serial number 8300, bearing Canadian registration CF-HSC) flown by Frank Samuel Pynn, out of the Prince George Airport, was observed flying in an unsafe manner, it went into a half roll, seemed to fall over on its back and nosed into a deep ravine in the cut-banks on the north side of town approximately one kilometre from the city centre. Pilot Frank Pynn, a former Royal Air Force Transport Command pilot, and his passenger, 15-year-old Jimmy Clarke, died on impact. Alcohol consumption was believed to be a factor in the crash and the Coroner's inquest found that Pynn died "through his own neglect and complete disregard for the Aeronautical Regulations of Canada." The wreckage is still there; however, most pieces are less than 2 m (6 ft 7 in) in length.

In 1964 the first pulp mill, Prince George Pulp and Paper was built, followed by two more in 1966, Northwood Pulp and Intercontinental Pulp. New schools and more housing were needed and the new subdivisions of Spruceland, Lakewood, Perry and Highglen were built. Then, in 1975, Prince George amalgamated and extended its borders to include the Hart area to the north, Pineview to the south and the old town of South Fort George to the east.

Low-lying areas adjacent to the confluence of the rivers, which can freeze, mean that those areas suffer recurring flooding. In late 2007 an ice jam formed on the Nechako River and soon grew to a length of more than 6 km (3.7 mi), causing widespread flooding in the city. Faster runoff due to devastation of nearby lodgepole pine forests by the mountain pine beetle was identified as a contributing factor. A state of emergency was declared on December 11. On January 14, 2008, with the ice jam still present, the Provincial Emergency Program approved an unprecedented plan to melt the ice by piping water from a pulp mill steam plant 2.7 km (1.7 mi) to the jam area where it would be mixed with well water and poured into the river at a temperature of 15 °C (59 °F). In the interim an amphibious excavator was used for 10 days to move some of the ice. Costing C$400,000 to build and C$3,000 per day to run, the "Warm Water System" was completed on January 29, by which time the ice jam had grown to 25 km (16 mi) long.

As a result of long-term lobbying from local groups (championed by local advocate Sheldon Clare, and members of 396 Air Cadet Squadron, 2618 Army Cadet Corps, 158 Sea Cadet Corps, 142 Navy League Corps, Branch 43 Royal Canadian Legion, and the Peacekeepers Association) in February 2011, Canadian Armed Forces 39 Canadian Brigade Group Headquarters announced that a detachment of the Rocky Mountain Rangers Army Reserve unit was to be formed in Prince George. In 2014, the Rocky Mountain Rangers increased recruiting efforts in the community to reach platoon and then company size.

Prince George hosted the 2015 Canada Winter Games.

== Geography ==
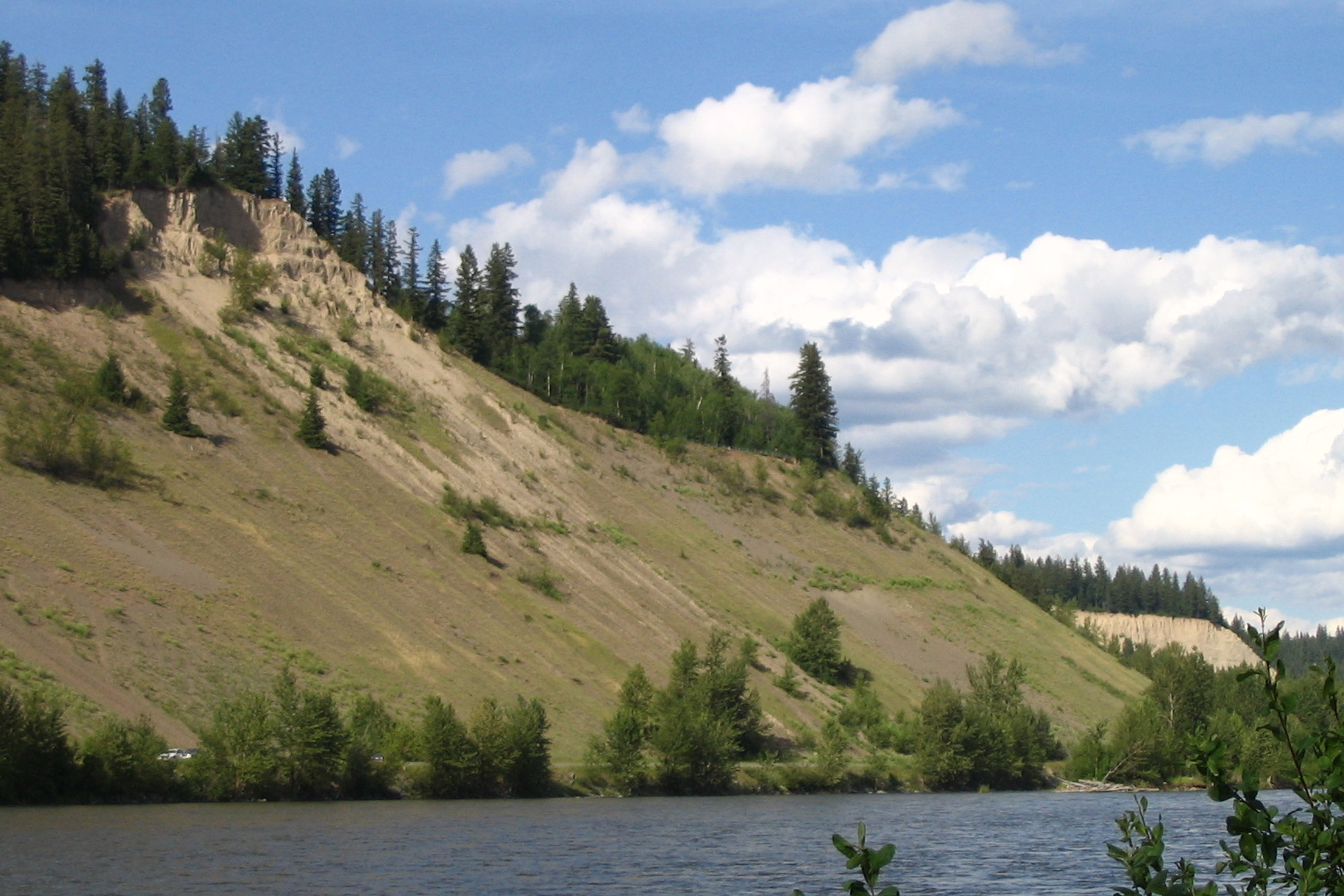
The cut banks on the Nechako River are Prince George's signature natural landmark.

Prince George is located in the Regional District of Fraser-Fort George near the transition between the northern and southern portions of the Rocky Mountain Trench. Prince George proper contains several areas: South Fort George, the Hart, the residential and light industrial neighbourhoods north of the Nechako River; College Heights, the southern part of the city which contains a mix of residential and commercial areas, and the Bowl, the valley that includes most of the city and the downtown. There are also a number of outlying localities that are also part of Prince George, such as Carlson. The cutbanks of the Nechako River are one of Prince George's many interesting geological features.

Local wild edible fruit include bunchberries, rose hips, blueberries, cranberries, chokecherries, strawberries, raspberries, saskatoons, currants, gooseberries, and soapberries (from which "Indian ice cream" is made). Morel mushrooms are also native to this area.

=== Climate ===
The area has a humid continental climate (Köppen climate classification Dfb, Trewartha Dclo), but is close to (and once had) a subarctic climate (Dfc) as May and September averages are both close to the 10 °C (50 °F) threshold. Winters are milder than the latitude and elevation might suggest: the January average is −9.6 °C (14.7 °F), and there are an average of 38 days from December to February where the high reaches or surpasses freezing. Winter months in which Pacific air masses dominate may thaw on a majority of days, as in January 2006 when the mean daily maximum temperature was 1.5 °C (34.7 °F). On the other hand, Arctic air masses can settle over the city for weeks at a time; in rare cases, such as January 1950, the temperature stays well below freezing over a whole calendar month. Summer days are warm, with a July high of 23.1 °C (73.6 °F), but lows are often cool, with monthly lows averaging below 10 °C (50 °F). The transition between winter and summer, however, is short. There is some precipitation year-round, but February to April is the driest period. At the airport snow averages 205.1 cm (80.7 in) each year and is heaviest in December and January, usually, but not always, falling between October and May.

One of the highest temperatures ever recorded in the Prince George area was 39.8 °C (103.6 °F) on June 28, 2021, at Prince George Massey Auto (53°53′59″N 122°47′21″W). The lowest temperature ever recorded was −50.0 °C (−58.0 °F) on January 2, 1950, at Prince George Airport.

Climate data for Prince George (Prince George Airport) WMO ID: 71896; coordinates 53°53′27″N 122°40′44″W; elevation: 691.3 m (2,268 ft); 1991–2020 normals (sun 1981–2010), extremes 1942–present
Month	Jan	Feb	Mar	Apr	May	Jun	Jul	Aug	Sep	Oct	Nov	Dec	Year
Record high humidex	12.8	12.2	19.6	29.2	35.3	36.4	37.3	36.1	32.7	25.1	18.6	11.3	37.3
Record high °C (°F)	12.8 (55.0)	12.8 (55.0)	19.9 (67.8)	29.7 (85.5)	36.0 (96.8)	38.4 (101.1)	35.6 (96.1)	33.7 (92.7)	31.4 (88.5)	25.2 (77.4)	18.8 (65.8)	12.0 (53.6)	38.4 (101.1)
Mean daily maximum °C (°F)	−3.9 (25.0)	−0.7 (30.7)	4.8 (40.6)	11.1 (52.0)	17.2 (63.0)	20.2 (68.4)	22.6 (72.7)	22.2 (72.0)	16.9 (62.4)	9.2 (48.6)	1.3 (34.3)	−3.0 (26.6)	9.8 (49.6)
Daily mean °C (°F)	−7.8 (18.0)	−5.4 (22.3)	−0.7 (30.7)	4.9 (40.8)	10.3 (50.5)	13.7 (56.7)	15.9 (60.6)	15.1 (59.2)	10.4 (50.7)	4.4 (39.9)	−2.1 (28.2)	−6.7 (19.9)	4.3 (39.7)
Mean daily minimum °C (°F)	−11.7 (10.9)	−10.0 (14.0)	−6.2 (20.8)	−1.3 (29.7)	3.3 (37.9)	7.2 (45.0)	9.1 (48.4)	8.0 (46.4)	4.0 (39.2)	−0.6 (30.9)	−5.5 (22.1)	−10.3 (13.5)	−1.2 (29.8)
Record low °C (°F)	−50.0 (−58.0)	−45.0 (−49.0)	−37.8 (−36.0)	−25.6 (−14.1)	−8.3 (17.1)	−2.8 (27.0)	−1.7 (28.9)	−3.9 (25.0)	−12.2 (10.0)	−26.5 (−15.7)	−41.7 (−43.1)	−45.6 (−50.1)	−50.0 (−58.0)
Record low wind chill	−51.5	−50.7	−46.0	−32.9	−12.5	−4.6	0.0	−3.5	−11.5	−31.8	−48.2	−49.4	−51.5
Average precipitation mm (inches)	49.5 (1.95)	30.5 (1.20)	29.2 (1.15)	37.4 (1.47)	45.4 (1.79)	68.2 (2.69)	64.4 (2.54)	47.1 (1.85)	54.8 (2.16)	66.4 (2.61)	56.7 (2.23)	40.8 (1.61)	590.2 (23.24)
Average rainfall mm (inches)	9.2 (0.36)	5.4 (0.21)	9.9 (0.39)	32.2 (1.27)	44.9 (1.77)	67.1 (2.64)	66.4 (2.61)	50.3 (1.98)	56.5 (2.22)	58.7 (2.31)	26.5 (1.04)	5.2 (0.20)	432.0 (17.01)
Average snowfall cm (inches)	52.7 (20.7)	26.3 (10.4)	23.7 (9.3)	7.7 (3.0)	2.0 (0.8)	0.0 (0.0)	0.0 (0.0)	0.0 (0.0)	0.5 (0.2)	9.8 (3.9)	34.5 (13.6)	46.8 (18.4)	203.9 (80.3)
Average precipitation days (≥ 0.2 mm)	15.2	11.6	12	10.8	12.8	15.6	14.5	12.9	13.2	16.3	15.8	14.8	165.5
Average rainy days (≥ 0.2 mm)	3.5	3.3	5.4	9.4	12.5	15.4	14.1	12.7	13.2	15.1	7.2	2.5	114.2
Average snowy days (≥ 0.2 cm)	13.6	9.4	8.1	2.9	1.0	0	0	0.0	0.3	2.2	10.3	13.1	60.9
Average relative humidity (%) (at 1500 LST)	78.6	67.6	52.9	43.6	40.3	45.9	46.6	45.7	52.5	62.8	76.7	80.0	57.8
Mean monthly sunshine hours	49.0	84.0	153.5	204.6	247.5	251.0	286.2	261.8	177.7	108.0	51.2	43.6	1,918.1
Percentage possible sunshine	19.7	30.5	41.8	48.7	50.1	49.2	55.8	56.9	46.5	32.9	19.8	18.7	39.2
Source: Environment and Climate Change Canada (June maximum) (sun)

Climate data for Prince George (Sewage Treatment Plant) Climate ID: 1096468; coordinates 53°52′48″N 122°46′03″W; elevation: 579.0 m (1,899.6 ft); 1991–2020 normals, extremes 1975–2021
Month	Jan	Feb	Mar	Apr	May	Jun	Jul	Aug	Sep	Oct	Nov	Dec	Year
Record high °C (°F)	14.5 (58.1)	14.5 (58.1)	21.5 (70.7)	31.7 (89.1)	37.5 (99.5)	39.0 (102.2)	36.0 (96.8)	35.0 (95.0)	33.0 (91.4)	26.0 (78.8)	20.0 (68.0)	14.5 (58.1)	39.0 (102.2)
Mean maximum °C (°F)	8.7 (47.7)	8.9 (48.0)	14.3 (57.7)	20.8 (69.4)	26.3 (79.3)	29.1 (84.4)	31.2 (88.2)	30.6 (87.1)	25.2 (77.4)	18.8 (65.8)	10.8 (51.4)	7.3 (45.1)	32.4 (90.3)
Mean daily maximum °C (°F)	−2.7 (27.1)	0.8 (33.4)	6.2 (43.2)	12.1 (53.8)	18.0 (64.4)	21.2 (70.2)	23.5 (74.3)	23.0 (73.4)	17.5 (63.5)	10.0 (50.0)	2.5 (36.5)	−1.7 (28.9)	10.9 (51.6)
Daily mean °C (°F)	−6.5 (20.3)	−3.8 (25.2)	0.6 (33.1)	5.8 (42.4)	11.2 (52.2)	14.7 (58.5)	17.0 (62.6)	16.2 (61.2)	11.6 (52.9)	5.3 (41.5)	−0.7 (30.7)	−5.1 (22.8)	5.5 (41.9)
Mean daily minimum °C (°F)	−10.4 (13.3)	−8.4 (16.9)	−5.0 (23.0)	−0.5 (31.1)	4.4 (39.9)	8.4 (47.1)	10.4 (50.7)	9.5 (49.1)	5.6 (42.1)	0.8 (33.4)	−4.0 (24.8)	−8.7 (16.3)	0.2 (32.3)
Mean minimum °C (°F)	−27.9 (−18.2)	−20.1 (−4.2)	−17.2 (1.0)	−7.5 (18.5)	−2.1 (28.2)	3.0 (37.4)	5.5 (41.9)	3.8 (38.8)	−1.5 (29.3)	−7.6 (18.3)	−16.4 (2.5)	−21.1 (−6.0)	−31.6 (−24.9)
Record low °C (°F)	−42.0 (−43.6)	−36.5 (−33.7)	−31.7 (−25.1)	−16.0 (3.2)	−6.0 (21.2)	0.0 (32.0)	1.0 (33.8)	−1.5 (29.3)	−7.5 (18.5)	−25.5 (−13.9)	−36.0 (−32.8)	−43.0 (−45.4)	−43.0 (−45.4)
Average precipitation mm (inches)	56.1 (2.21)	35.3 (1.39)	31.4 (1.24)	35.9 (1.41)	45.5 (1.79)	63.8 (2.51)	59.6 (2.35)	45.7 (1.80)	53.8 (2.12)	61.8 (2.43)	53.3 (2.10)	48.6 (1.91)	591.5 (23.29)
Average snowfall cm (inches)	44.9 (17.7)	28.0 (11.0)	15.9 (6.3)	2.6 (1.0)	0.4 (0.2)	0.0 (0.0)	0.0 (0.0)	0.0 (0.0)	trace	5.9 (2.3)	22.2 (8.7)	39.6 (15.6)	159.9 (63.0)
Average extreme snow depth cm (inches)	40.4 (15.9)	39.7 (15.6)	32.6 (12.8)	8.2 (3.2)	0.07 (0.03)	0.0 (0.0)	0.0 (0.0)	0.0 (0.0)	0.0 (0.0)	3.8 (1.5)	10.9 (4.3)	24.3 (9.6)	51.3 (20.2)
Average precipitation days (≥ 0.2 mm)	13.6	9.7	10.0	10.4	11.4	13.7	13.0	11.4	12.6	15.1	13.2	12.5	146.6
Average snowy days (≥ 0.2 cm)	10.8	6.9	5.1	1.0	0.2	0.0	0.0	0.0	0.07	1.5	7.1	10.2	42.8
Source 1: Environment and Climate Change Canada (some temperature extremes) (November maximum)
Source 2: KNMI

=== Sewer and water utilities ===
Prince George's drinking water is taken from the Nechako and Fraser Rivers via ten wells. The raw water is disinfected with sodium hypochlorite. The local government treats sewage in a treatment facility in the Lansdowne area, on the west side of the Fraser River, or one of three other smaller treatment facilities on the east side. In the 2014 municipal election, the people of Prince George voted in favour of removing fluoride from their drinking water in a non-binding referendum. Prince George's new mayor and city council, at their first meeting, decided to follow the wishes of its voters. Fluoridation of the city's water supply ended in December 2014.

=== Air pollution ===
The Prince George airshed has many local sources of various air pollutants including several major industrial sources (pulp mills, sawmills and an oil refinery), vehicle emissions, locomotives, uncovered coal cars, unpaved and paved road surfaces, vegetative burning and residential and commercial heating. Because a large part of the city and its local sources of air pollution are contained within a valley, there are often meteorological conditions that trap pollutants and result in episodes of poor air quality and unhealthy levels of air pollution exposure in some areas.

More people die in Prince George every year due to diseases associated with air pollutants than any other community in the province, according to data gathered by two BC physicians. Although, "Copes said it was difficult to definitively say certain deaths are caused by pollution because it's not a factor that is easily recognizable."

== Demographics ==
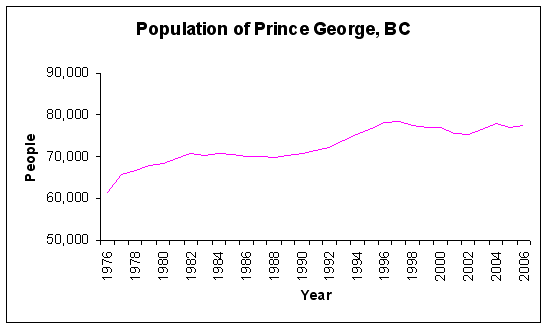
Population trend, 1976–2006

	2011 Canadian Census		2016 Canadian census
	Prince George	British Columbia	Prince George	British Columbia
Median age	33.9 years	38.4 years	38.4 years	43.0 years
Under 15 years old	21%	18%	17.5%	14.9%
Over 65 years old	7.6%	14%	14.1%	18.3%
Visible minority	6%	21%	8.9%	30.2%
Protestant	31%	31%	n/a	n/a
Catholic	21%	17%	n/a	n/a

Federal census population history
Year	Pop.	±%
1951	4,703	—
1956	10,563	+124.6%
1961	13,877	+31.4%
1966	24,471	+76.3%
1971	49,365	+101.7%
1976	59,929	+21.4%
1981	67,559	+12.7%
1986	67,621	+0.1%
1991	69,653	+3.0%
1996	75,150	+7.9%
2001	72,406	−3.7%
2006	70,981	−2.0%
2011	71,974	+1.4%
2016	74,003	+2.8%
2021	76,708	+3.7%
Source: Statistics Canada

In the 2021 Census of Population conducted by Statistics Canada, Prince George had a population of 76,708 living in 31,793 of its 33,643 total private dwellings, a change of 3.7% from its 2016 population of 74,003. It has a metro census agglomeration population of 89,490. With a land area of 316.74 km^{2} (122.29 sq mi), it had a population density of 242.2/km^{2} (627.2/sq mi) in 2021.

In 2001, 23% of households were one-person households, below the 27% average provincewide, and 31% married couples with children, above the 26% average. Prince George had a smaller proportion of married couples than the province, 47% compared to 51%, but very similar persons per households. Only 14% of residents between 20 and 64 years of age completed university, almost half the provincial average, and 22% did not complete high school, similar to the 19% provincial average.

=== Ethnicity ===
Panethnic groups in the City of Prince George (2001−2021)
Panethnic group	2021		2016		2011		2006		2001	
Panethnic group	Pop.	%	Pop.	%	Pop.	%	Pop.	%	Pop.	%
European (Note: Statistic includes all persons that did not make up part of a visible minority or an indigenous identity.)	54,945	73.1%	54,895	75.67%	56,610	79.97%	58,125	82.59%	60,520	84.06%
Indigenous	11,470	15.26%	11,160	15.38%	9,065	12.81%	8,045	11.43%	7,155	9.94%
South Asian	3,820	5.08%	2,525	3.48%	1,935	2.73%	1,785	2.54%	2,160	3%
Southeast Asian (Note: Statistic includes total responses of "Filipino" and "Southeast Asian" under visible minority section on census.)	1,670	2.22%	1,270	1.75%	1,090	1.54%	715	1.02%	530	0.74%
East Asian (Note: Statistic includes total responses of "Chinese", "Korean", and "Japanese" under visible minority section on census.)	1,315	1.75%	1,325	1.83%	1,090	1.54%	1,045	1.48%	970	1.35%
African	1,115	1.48%	710	0.98%	575	0.81%	335	0.48%	360	0.5%
Middle Eastern (Note: Statistic includes total responses of "West Asian" and "Arab" under visible minority section on census.)	250	0.33%	195	0.27%	165	0.23%	70	0.1%	0	0%
Latin American	245	0.33%	265	0.37%	140	0.2%	125	0.18%	190	0.26%
Other/multiracial (Note: Statistic includes total responses of "Visible minority, n.i.e." and "Multiple visible minorities" under visible minority section on census.)	330	0.44%	215	0.3%	105	0.15%	130	0.18%	120	0.17%
Total responses	75,160	97.98%	72,550	98.04%	70,790	98.35%	70,375	99.15%	71,995	99.43%
Total population	76,708	100%	74,003	100%	71,974	100%	70,981	100%	72,406	100%
Note: Totals greater than 100% due to multiple origin responses.

=== Religion ===
According to the 2021 census, religious groups in Prince George included:

- Irreligion (44,685 persons or 59.5%)
- Christianity (25,840 persons or 34.4%)
- Sikhism (2,405 persons or 3.2%)
- Hinduism (585 persons or 0.8%)
- Islam (535 persons or 0.7%)
- Buddhism (190 persons or 0.3%)
- Indigenous Spirituality (165 persons or 0.2%)
- Judaism (90 persons or 0.1%)

=== Crime ===
For three consecutive years, from 2010 to 2012, Maclean's named Prince George the most dangerous city in Canada, with its crime rate being 114% above the national average. In 2011, the magazine cited gangs, drug-related crimes, and nine homicides as the reason for its high crime rate, although the magazine did state that the city's crime rate is declining each year. In 2016, Prince George was named #4 on the list of the most dangerous cities for violent crime in Canada. In 2023, there were 8 homicides reported in Prince George giving the city a murder rate of 10.4 per 100,000 people.

== Economy ==
The economy of Prince George in the first decade of the 21st century has come to be dominated by service industries. The Northern Health Authority, centred in Prince George, has a $450 million annual budget and invested more than $100 million in infrastructure. Part of these investments was the 2012 opening of the BC Cancer Agency's Centre for the North, which includes for radiation therapy facilities and associated buildings for modern cancer care.

Education is another part of this city with the University of Northern British Columbia, the College of New Caledonia and School District #57, education adds more than $780 million into the local economy annually.

Forestry dominated the local economy throughout the 20th century, including plywood manufacture, numerous sawmills and three pulp-and-pellet mills as major employers and customers. The spruce beetle epidemic of the late 1980s and 1990s resulted in a short term boom in the forest industry as companies rushed to cut dead standing trees before the trees lost value. Sawmill closures (and the creation of 'supermills') occurred around 2005, and the largest pellet mill closed in 2022 due to dwindling supply and lack of a sea port. Mining exploration and development may become the future of Prince George. Initiatives Prince George estimates that the Nechako Basin contains over 5,000,000 bbl (790,000 m^{3}) of oil.

Other industry includes two chemical plants, an oil refinery, brewery, dairy, machine shops, aluminum boat building, log home construction, value added forestry product and specialty equipment manufacturing. Prince George is also a staging centre for mining and prospecting, and a major regional transportation, trade and government hub. Several major retailers are expanding into the Prince George market, a trend expected to persist. In recent years, several market research call centres have opened in Prince George.

Heritage, College Heights, Hart Highlands and St. Lawrence Heights are prime residential areas, both commercial and residential development are growing at an accelerated rate and more subdivisions are planned for St. Lawrence Heights, West Cranbrook Hill and East Austin Road.

== Education ==
Prince George's education system encompasses 28 public, anglophone or French immersion public elementary schools and 6 secondary schools as part of School District 57 Prince George, and eight private schools. It is also home to a public francophone elementary school, which is a part of School District 93 Conseil scolaire francophone, a province-wide francophone school district. Post-secondary education choices include the regional College of New Caledonia (CNC), which offers two-year university-transfer courses, plus vocational and professional programs. Several BC universities, British Columbia Institute of Technology (BCIT) and the Open Learning Agency have integrated their local programs with CNC. Prince George is also home to Guardian Aerospace Flight School.

The University of Northern British Columbia (UNBC), established in 1990, is the second-newest university in Canada. A total of 55 undergraduate programs, 27 masters programs and three PhD programs are now offered at UNBC, as well as the new Northern Medical Program, a joint program with the University of British Columbia intended to alleviate the shortage of physicians in the north. A degree-granting institution with regional teaching centres in nine BC communities and a sponsor for several research institutes, UNBC has recently completed the construction of the I.K. Barber Enhanced Forestry Laboratory. UNBC's hilltop campus overlooks the City of Prince George and has views of the foothills of the Rocky Mountains to the east. In 2015 and 2016 UNBC earned the top small university in Canada ranking by Maclean's. UNBC has consistently been positioned in the top three for the last ten years. The university was first entered into the McLean's rankings in 2005 as the best small university in Western Canada.

The College of New Caledonia (CNC) is a post-secondary educational institution that serves the residents of central British Columbia. It was established in Prince George in 1969, and has since expanded across northern British Columbia, with campuses in Quesnel, Mackenzie, Burns Lake, Valemount, Fort St. James, Fraser Lake and Vanderhoof. CNC enrolls about 5,000 students each year in approximately 90 distinct programs in business and management, community and continuing education, health sciences, adult basic education / upgrading, trades and industry, social services, and technologies. About 75 of these programs are available at CNC Prince George. CNC offers university classes leading to degrees and professional programs in more than 50 subjects, with excellent transferability to universities in BC, Alberta, and elsewhere. All university classes are available at CNC Prince George, and many are available at other campuses.

== Sports and recreation ==
Club	Sport	League	Venue
Prince George Cougars	Ice hockey	Western Hockey League (WHL)	CN Centre
Prince George Spruce Kings	Ice hockey	British Columbia Hockey League (BCHL)	Prince George Coliseum
Northern BC Centre for Skating	Ice skating	Skate Canada (BC/YT)	Elksentre Arena
UNBC Timberwolves	Soccer & Basketball	U Sports	Masich Place Stadium

Prince George's teams include the Prince George Cougars of the Western Hockey League (WHL), the Prince George Spruce Kings of the British Columbia Hockey League (BCHL), Youth Bowling Club (YBC) bowling teams (Nechako Bowling, 5th Avenue, and also a ten pin team), and Prince George Curling (Prince George Golf and Curling Club). Recently, the Duchess Park Secondary School Senior boys basketball team won the provincial AA title for the first time in 26 years.

The February 1978 Northern B.C. Winter Games hosted by Prince George and organized by John Furlong were highly attended by 5,600 participants from age 8 to 90 in 38 events.

The Spruce Kings hosted the 2007 Royal Bank Cup May 5–13 at the CN Centre.

Prince George has been home to several National Hockey League players, including Murray Baron, Blair Betts, Tyler Bouck, Chris Mason, Ronald Petrovický, Justin Pogge, Dan Hamhuis, Sheldon Souray, Derek Boogaard, Dustin Byfuglien, Devin Setoguchi, Turner Stevenson and Darcy Rota. Eric Brewer and Zdeno Chára were also teammates on the Cougars in 1995 and 1996.

Prince George Citizen Field opened in the spring of 2006. The baseball facility has established itself as one of the most unusual diamonds in British Columbia.

Recreation facilities include 116 playgrounds and parks, baseball, soccer and lacrosse fields, eight golf courses, plus tennis courts, ice rinks and roller rinks, a new modern Aquatic Centre as well as an older swimming pool and the CN Centre, which is a 5,995-seat multi-purpose arena. For hikers there is an 11 km (6.8 mi) riverfront system of urban hiking trails called the Heritage Trails. Four provincial parks in the region provide downhill, cross-country and heliskiing.

Parks include:

Park	Notes
Lheidli T'enneh Memorial Park	formerly known as Fort George Park
Paddlewheel Park	Located in South Fort George. This location is where Paddle wheeler boats landed in the town.
Rainbow Park
Connaught Hill	located behind City Hall, views of the city.
Foot Park
L.C. Gunn Park	Trail on the east side of the Fraser River
Ginter's Property
Eskers Park
Forests for the World
Cottonwood Island Park	Trails along Cottonwood Island and the former Island Cache community.

North of Prince George is the Huble Homestead and Giscome Portage. The Otway Nordic Centre, operated by the Caledonia Nordic Ski Club, is home to one of the largest Nordic ski clubs in the province, and boasts more than 40 km (25 mi) of groomed trails – of which 5 km (3.1 mi) are lit trails for evening skiing, a biathlon range, and a 130 m^{2} (1,400 sq ft) day lodge.

The Caledonia Ramblers Hiking Club offers weekly hikes in the city and surrounding countryside from May to October, as well as snowshoeing in the winter months, while the Prince George Section of the Alpine Club of Canada offers year-round hiking, scrambling, climbing, skiing and ice-climbing trips in the nearby Cariboo and Rocky Mountains and local crags. The Prince George Backcountry Recreation Society is an umbrella organization representing these and several other Prince George outdoor clubs.

For race fans, the Prince George Auto Racing Association (PGARA) offers a variety of racing events at the PGARA Speedway including the locally famous hit-to-pass races.

The Prince George Rod and Gun Club maintains two range sites. Hartman Rd Range offers Trap/Skeet, rifle, silhouette, and handgun ranges, while the Blackwater Range offers multiple action bays and a 1500 m rifle range.

Prince George offers a Pride Centre for all LGBTQ and ally members in Prince George and the greater north. Located at the University of Northern British Columbia, the PC, an organization under the Northern Pride Centre Society, offers a safe space, resources, and support.

Prince George offers several nightclubs, sports bars, pubs and fine dining facilities.

The Treasure Cove Hotel and Casino is located at the junction of Highways 16 and 97.

Moviegoers can choose between the Famous Players, now Cineplex Entertainment, six-plex or the Park Drive-in Theatre, which also offers mini-golf facilities and a go-kart track. Cinema CNC hosts two arts cinema series each year in the fall and winter, as well as a festival of Canadian films each February.

As part of its 100th anniversary, the City of Prince George hosted the 2015 Canada Winter Games.

== Arts and culture ==
Prince George contains many locations for off-road motorcycling. These include motorcycle trails and motocross tracks like the Blackwater motocross park and the BCR site.

=== Art galleries and studios ===
- The Two Rivers Gallery, which opened in June 2000, has two exhibition galleries named the North and South Canfor Galleries, a gift shop and a galleria. It offers guided tours and art classes for both adults and children.
- Studio 2880 houses the Artists' Workshop, the quilters', potters', weavers' and spinners' guilds. Its sister building, Studio 2820, is a Ticketmaster outlet and houses the Artisan Gift Shoppe.

=== Theatres ===
Prince George Amusement Company opened the 550-seat-capacity Princess Theatre on the corner of Third Ave and Vancouver Street in 1914, which appears distinct from its namesake on Central Ave. The company's Rex Theatre opened on George Street that December. The Dreamland Theatre, which relocated to George Street from South Fort George in January 1915, staged some vaudeville, and charity concerts, and accommodated political, religious, and sundry meetings. Movie screenings were irregular prior to a 1918 reopening. Initially, while the Rex primarily screened movies, the Princess was largely vacant when not a venue for opera, charity concerts, and political and sundry meetings. The 1919 relaunch as a movie venue was short lived. The Rex also held wrestling, charity concerts, and political, religious, and sundry meetings.

Levi Graham (1879–1947), who took over the Rex Theatre in 1921, had gained industry experience since 1907. He also operated poolrooms. Further enterprises were movie screenings at select interior towns, refurbishing and managing the Royal Hotel, and operating club establishments. Al Gardner and Jim Bord briefly managed the Dreamland Theatre in 1922. Acquired by Graham, the Princess Theatre reopened for movies in 1923. That year, Capitol Entertainments of Canada purchased the Dreamland Theatre, and renamed it the Capitol, with Adams remaining as resident manager. Graham and two partners, operating as Prince George Theatres, acquired the Capitol two years later. Facing insufficient demand, it continued mainly as a venue for live performances and public meetings.

Graham moved the Rex to the corner of Third Avenue and Dominion Street. After gutting and upgrading, it opened in 1926 as the 500-seat Strand Theatre. Condemned as a safety risk, the Capitol was demolished in 1934. Adding a level floor above the existing one in 1935, the Princess served as a dance hall/ballroom, and community centre for indoor sports. After an extensive 1942 upgrade, it returned as a movie theatre. Graham built, briefly operated, and sold the Wells theatre. Selling his two local theatres to Herb G. Stevenson in 1944, Graham devoted his attention to his Six Mile (Tabor) Lake Lodge enterprise.

Odeon Theatres acquired the Strand and Princess in 1969, demolishing the former in 1975. Eighteen months later, the latter suffered the same fate, replaced by a three-screen complex on the site. Cinema Treasures appears reasonably accurate in covering later theatre developments.

==== Live theatre and symphony ====
- Theatre Northwest is a professional theatre company producing stage productions throughout the year.
- The Prince George Theatre Workshop Society is a stage production company founded in the 1960s which puts on amateur theatre events throughout the year.
- The Prince George Playhouse (originally built by the Prince George Theatre Workshop Society, now owned by the City of Prince George) has many different uses such as amateur and professional theatre, musical events and major plays put on by local small businesses.
- The Prince George Symphony Orchestra (PGSO) is a mixed professional and semi-professional orchestra. The orchestra plays a number of concerts each year at venues around the city and occasionally tours other communities in northern British Columbia. The PGSO performs at a variety of venues, such as Vanier Hall and the Prince George Playhouse.
- The Street Spirits Theatre Company is a Prince George youth-oriented social-action theatre group founded by its Artistic Director Andrew Burton with support from The Youth Around Prince Resource Centre. The group creates and presents audience interactive performances using improv theatre techniques inspired by Theatre of the Oppressed (Augusto Boal) and Theatre for Living (David Diamond) along with many other influences. The group has been running since 1999 and has been given several grants from organizations such as the Vancouver Foundation and awards such as the Otto Rene Castillo Award for Political Theatre and the Canada Peace Medal, among others. The group writes and performs interactive plays about issues affecting communities, such as drug addiction, teen pregnancy and racism and has put out several movies including a feature-length film dealing with northern sex trade recruitment entitled "Streetwise."

A 2005 cultural project that involved Prince George had 'Spirit Bears' placed throughout various locations around the city. The 'Spirit Bear' is a fiberglass statue of a bear that has various sceneries painted on it.

=== Museums and libraries ===
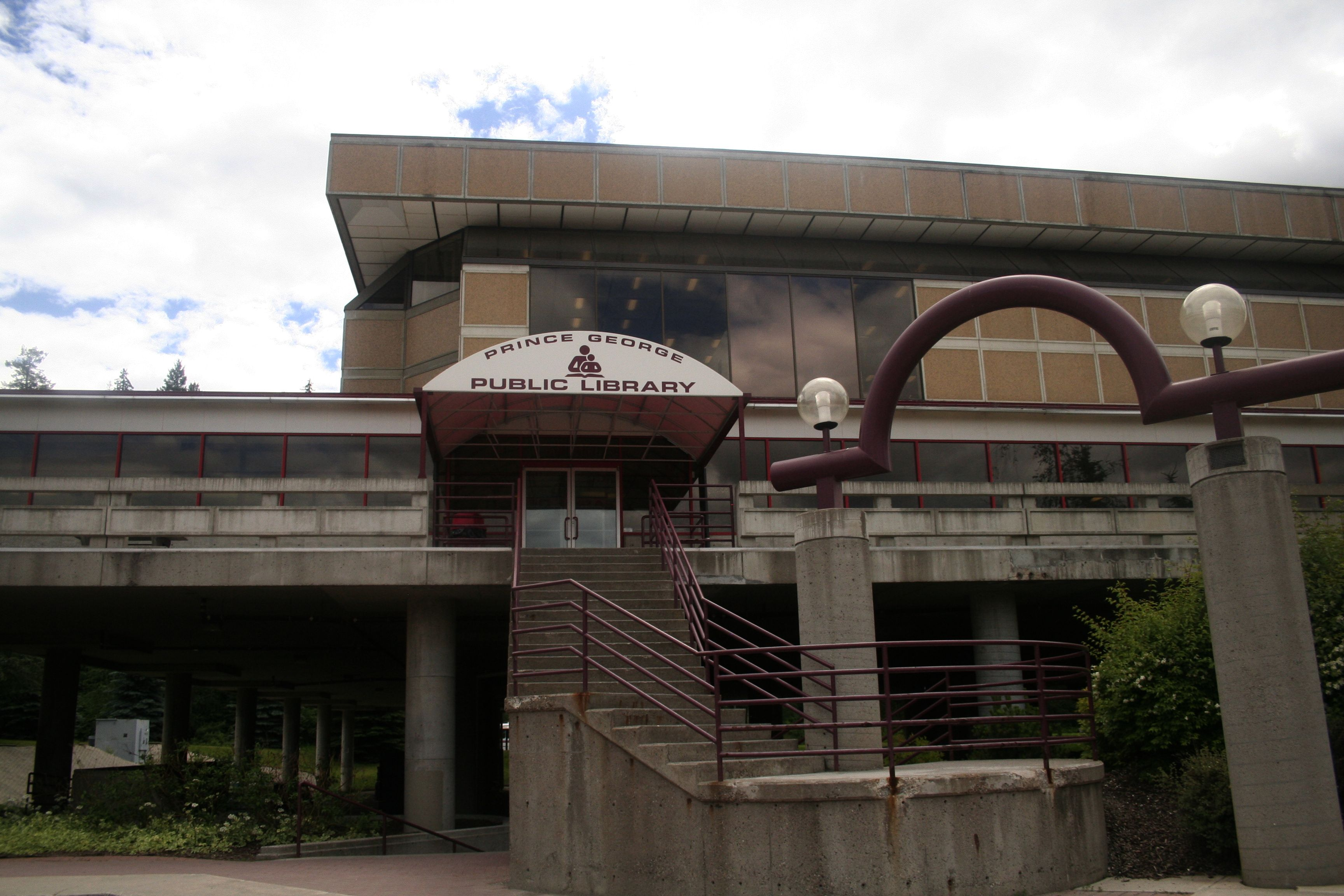
Downtown branch of the Prince George Public Library

- The Exploration Place Museum and Science Centre is located in Lheidli T'enneh Memorial Park and offers a wide variety of galleries and exhibits, including a paleontology exhibit, First Nations exhibit, children's gallery, the Prince George Sports Hall of Fame, and the 2 ft (610 mm) narrow gauge Fort George Railway complete with a working steam locomotive.
- The Prince George Railway and Forestry Museum opened in July 1986, coinciding with Expo 86 and 150 years of rail travel in Canada. The museum has one of the largest vintage rail collections in the province, including vintage rail cars, locomotives and historical buildings. Most of the museum pieces are located outdoors on the lot. Some historical buildings include a building showing the advancement of the telephone and a building that was once a train stop. There is also old firetrucks and forestry equipment. A mini-train goes around the museum lot.
- The Prince George Public Library has two branches in the city, the Bob Harkins branch in the downtown area, which is considered the "main" library of the city and the smaller Nechako branch in the Hart. The College of New Caledonia and University of Northern British Columbia both have libraries available to local residents.

=== Monuments and art installations ===
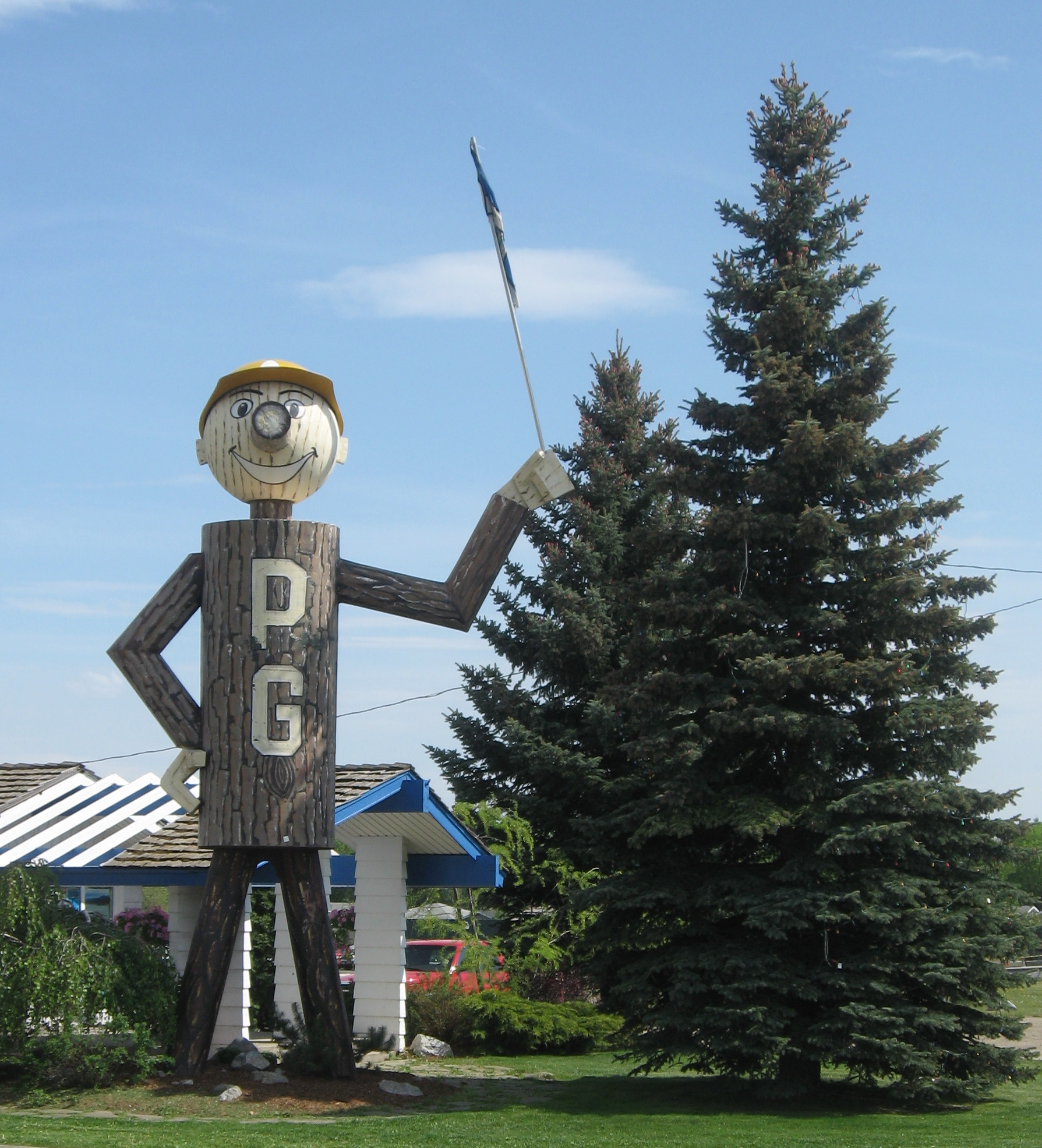
Mr. PG at the junction of Highway 97 and Highway 16

Mr. PG was first constructed in 1960 as a symbol of the importance of the forest industry to Prince George. That year he took part in the Prince George May Day parade and could speak and bow. In 1961, he was entered in the Kelowna Regatta and the Vancouver PNE Parade, and also travelled to Smithers. Two years later, he appeared in the 1963 Grey Cup parade.

Today, Mr. PG stands at the junction of Highway 97 and Highway 16. He is 8.138 m (26.70 ft) tall and his head is 1.5 m (4 ft 11 in) in diameter.

== Notable people ==
- Inga Andersen (1909–1959), dancer, singer, actor, and World War II entertainer for British troops
- Anne Pomeroy Autor (1935–2018), biochemist and Professor at the University of British Columbia
- Aviel Barclay (born 1969), first trained and certified female sofer (religious scribe)
- Murray Baron, former National Hockey League (NHL) defenceman, played for the Vancouver Canucks
- Birdman (born 1969; real name: Bryan Williams), American rapper, producer, and co-founder of Cash Money Records
- Shirley Bond, politician
- Lois Boone, politician
- Dean Butler, actor
- Zdeno Chára, Slovak ice hockey defenceman, played for the Prince George Cougars before his NHL career
- Denise Chong, writer
- Brett Connolly, Canadian professional ice hockey player
- Jon Cooper, NHL coach
- Jonathan Crow, violinist and concertmaster of the Toronto Symphony Orchestra
- Grace Dove, actress
- Brian Fawcett, writer
- Donna Feore, choreographer and musical theatre director
- John Furlong, former president and CEO of the Vancouver Organizing Committee for the 2010 Olympic and Paralympic Winter Games (VANOC)
- Marcel Gagnon, musician
- Kym Gouchie, musician and visual artist
- Cliff Hucul, racing driver
- Charles Jago, university past-president, Member of the Order of Canada
- Malhar R. Kendurkar, Observational Astrophysicist and President of Prince George Astronomical Observatory
- Cody Legebokoff, serial killer
- Harold Mann, boxer
- Brandon Manning (born 1990), Canadian professional ice hockey player
- Barry McKinnon, writer
- Ben Meisner, journalist
- Bridget Moran, social activist and writer
- Mayo Moran, legal scholar
- Hubert Patrick O'Connor, Catholic bishop who resigned due to charges of sexual abuse
- Meryeta O'Dine, Olympic snowboard medalist
- David William Ramsay, disgraced judge
- Paul Ramsey, politician
- Daryl Reaugh, former NHL goaltender, commentator
- Dave Rosin (born 1981), musician, electric guitarist
- Darcy Rota, former NHL forward, played for the Vancouver Canucks
- Anthony Sedlak, chef and host of Food Network Canada's The Main
- Barry Seymour, aboriginal leader
- George Sipos, poet and writer
- Turner Stevenson, former NHL forward
- Alyxandria Treasure, high jumper, member of 2016 Canadian Olympic team
- Gillian Wigmore, writer
- Lynda Williams, writer
- Jared Young, Major League Baseball player

== Transportation ==
Located at the intersection of Highways 97 and 16, Prince George is the hub for northern British Columbia. Considerable truck traffic passes through Prince George, which also has extensive facilities for maintenance of trucks and heavy equipment.

The streets in the "Bowl" area of Prince George are laid out in a grid, with streets travelling north–south, and avenues travelling east–west. The streets are named after prominent citizens, and they are placed in alphabetical order, starting with "A" (Alward Street) near downtown, and continuing westward to "R" (Ruggles Street) in the western part of the city. Some avenues in the city are numbered. 1st Avenue is located the northern part of the Bowl, and the numbering increases southward until 22nd Avenue (the highest-numbered avenue in the city).

The grid in the downtown area is rotated so that avenues run from northwest to southeast, and streets run northeast to southwest. All avenues in downtown are numbered, while most of the streets are named after various cities and provinces of Canada.

Many streets in College Heights are named after various colleges and universities. However, College Heights streets are not laid out in a grid like the Bowl. Instead, many roads in College Heights are curved and/or winding, and most are called avenues or crescents.

There is an inland port to Prince Rupert in Prince George which is served by CN Rail.

Prince George Airport, located just within the southern boundary of the city, 2.8 NM (5.2 km; 3.2 mi) southeast. The airport is classified as an airport of entry by Nav Canada and is staffed by the Canada Border Services Agency (CBSA). The airport can handle aircraft with up to 30 passengers or 120 if they are unloaded in stages. In 2016, 462,007 passengers used Prince George Airport. The primary air connection to the rest of the world is provided by multiple daily flights to Vancouver International Airport on Air Canada Express and WestJet Encore, and Calgary on WestJet Encore. WestJet provides seasonal service with a weekly direct flight to Puerto Vallarta, Mexico during the winter months. Pacific Coastal Airlines offers a daily flight to and from Victoria International Airport. Central Mountain Air and Northern Thunderbird Air fly to regional and smaller centers. Horizon Air provided daily service to Seattle for a few months in 2008, but the service no longer exists as of 2009. Charter services provide flights to outlying areas primarily by floatplane, though helicopter service is also available. An expansion study to allow the airport to handle Boeing 747 cargo flights was completed. The airport was expanded and is listed as having the third longest runway in Canada but since it was opened in 2009 it has not seen expanded use by any new airlines or 747s other than the test use by one cargo flight.

CNR freight lines operate out of Prince George as well as Via Rail passenger service; the Jasper–Prince Rupert train overnights at the Prince George station.

Local public transportation consists of the PG Transit bus service.

== Annual events ==
- The British Columbia Northern Exhibition, also known as the BCNE, started in 1912 and is the city's largest summer event. The four-day show was known as the Prince George Exhibition or PGX until 2012 when the name was changed as part of 100th anniversary celebrations. The BCNE is held each August and attractions include a large midway, food fair, trade show, art and horticulture exhibitions, 4-H exhibitions, firefighter competitions and many other events.
- The Forestry and Resources Expo began in 1985 to educate the public about the importance of forests to the city and region, while displaying the latest in forestry technology, supplies and services. The Expo was revamped in 2013 and renamed the Canada North Resources Expo to reflect a focus on the wide range of sectors that impact the economy in Prince George and northern British Columbia including forestry, oil and gas, mining, independent power producers, the biomass industry and transportation.
- Downtown Summerfest was revived by the Downtown Business Improvement Association in 2012 and is held every August. The street party takes place in downtown Prince George and features entertainment, vendors, activities for children and a Taste Pavilion featuring food from local restaurants.
- Kiwanis AleFest - the great Northern British Columbia Craft Beer Festival takes place annually on the last weekend of January.
- The Prince George Coldsnap Festival (formerly known as the Prince George Folk Festival) is a national folk music festival held annually in the winter at various venues throughout Prince George. Past artists have included John Denver, Bruce Cockburn, Sarah Harmer, Janis Ian, Alpha Yaya Diallo. 2006 saw Matthew Good, Fred Eaglesmith, The Paperboys, and others.
- The Snow Daze Winter Festival is held each February. Some of the featured events include the Mr. PG pageant, curling, bed races, OTL (over the line) baseball, Texas hold 'em poker tournament and snow golf.
- Prince George celebrates BC River's Day on the last Sunday in Sefree music festival. Performers in 2006 included Marcel Gagnon and Fear Zero among many others.
- The Father's Day Show and Shine is held in Lheidli T'enneh Memorial Park and features vendors, live performers and both vintage and modern cars. 2007's event saw an estimated 25,000 visitors and 365 cars were on display.
- The Prince George Iceman Multi-sport race takes place, usually the second week of February. This event starts with an 8 km ski, then a 10 km run, a 5 km iceskate, a 5 km run and then wraps up with an 800 m indoor swim. This event has been happening since 1988. Participants can compete as individuals, or on teams of 2–5. Junior teams can compete in a slightly modified course, a shorter ski and swim and the 15 km run is broken into 3 segments instead of 2.

== Government and politics ==
The mayor serves with nine councillors. Prince George holds four of the fourteen seats at the Regional District of Fraser-Fort George. Prince George lies within the Regional District of Fraser-Fort George.

School District 57, which includes not only the city of Prince George but a large, sparsely populated area to the east and north, is governed by seven elected trustees.

Provincially, Prince George is divided into three electoral districts: Prince George-Valemount represented by Rosalyn Bird, Prince George-Mackenzie represented by Kiel Giddens, and Prince George-North Cariboo represented by Sheldon Clare. All three representative are members of the Conservative Party.

Federally, Prince George is divided between Cariboo—Prince George represented by Todd Doherty and Prince George—Peace River—Northern Rockies with Bob Zimmer. Both are federal Conservatives.

== See also ==
- Canadian weather radar network
- Royal eponyms in Canada
