= Diana Nemiroff =

Canadian curator and art historian (born 1946)

Diana Nemiroff (born May 1, 1946) is a Canadian curator and art historian in the field of contemporary art.

== Career ==
Diana Nemiroff has numerous exhibitions to her credit, including Land, Spirit, Power: First Nations at the National Gallery of Canada (1992), National Gallery of Canada, Ottawa (co-curated with Robert Houle and Charlotte Townsend-Gault), which was the National Gallery's first major exhibition featuring the accomplishments of a new generation of Aboriginal artists. Other exhibitions include Crossings / Traversées (1998), National Gallery of Canada, Ottawa, which examined the theme of globalization and migration in contemporary art; and Melvin Charney and Krzysztof Wodiczko (1986) for the 42nd Venice Biennale.

Nemiroff has also won recognition for her writing on such artists as Eric Cameron, Jana Sterbak and Nancy Spero, which have appeared in several catalogues and monographs.

In 2012, Nemiroff was the recipient of the Governor General's Award in Visual and Media Arts.
