= Marcel Gagnon (musician) =

Marcel Gagnon (born 2 May 1950) is a Canadian composer, singer, guitarist, and substance abuse counsellor.

== Career ==
Born in Prince George, British Columbia, a member of the Lheidli T'enneh Band and the 16th of 20 children in his family, Gagnon was involved in music from his youth, playing for dances, weddings and private functions in central British Columbia, as well as for radio shows in Alberta and British Columbia. His career was interrupted by severe alcoholism, but after undertaking a recovery program, he recorded his breakthrough album Crazy Maker at the Banff Centre for the Arts in 2001. The album was nominated for a Best Music of Aboriginal Canada award in the Juno Awards of 2002. He has produced three other albums.

In 1997, he graduated with a degree in addictions counselling. Acknowledging himself as a recovering alcoholic and a person affected by fetal alcohol syndrome disorder, Gagnon became a member of the Board of Directors of the Whitecrow Village FASD Society upon its inception in 2002. He has become a prominent advocate and counsellor for persons affected by the Canadian Indian residential school system. Currently, he is an elder of the Lheidli T'enneh First Nation. He teaches spirituality, stating that

Man's struggle has always been dark against light. Positive versus negative. Our teaching is to recognize these two forces and which is the greater. The Medicine Man within, I refer to as Tsiyan/Grandfather. Bheni Hoolo is the darker force that wars within us. We (allow) that greater power within, Tsiyan, to help us to recognize and overcome Bheni Hoolo's influence.

Gagnon is currently working with Indigenous youth in conflict with the law, presenting his program, "Awakening the Medicine Man Within," and performing music.

== Discography ==
=== Albums ===
- Crazy Maker, 2001
- The Watchman – Tom Crow, 2002
- Captured, 2006
- New Years Day, 2009
