= Prince George Public Library =

Public library system in British Columbia, Canada

- 53.9123°N 122.7496°W
- Location: Prince George, British Columbia, Canada
- Type: Public Library
- Established: June 20, 1955; 71 years ago
- Branches: 2

Collection
- Items collected: Books, Video Games, eBooks, Books on CD, DVDs, Local History/Reference, Large Print, Literacy, Magazines, Newspapers
- Size: 171,529 (2016)

Access and use
- Circulation: 870,362 (2016)
- Members: 51,046

Other information
- Website: pgpl.ca

The Prince George Public Library (PGPL) is the public library system for the city of Prince George, British Columbia. Between its two branches, the Prince George Public Library offers the public access to a collection of over 171,529 items.

== History ==
The first borrowing library in Prince George was established at the First Presbyterian Church. Membership cost $1 per year, and nearly 200 books were available by September 1912.

A City library was first opened on May 12, 1920. The library initially contained 500 books from Vancouver's Carnegie Library and 600 books loaned by the Dominion government. The library was open to the public on Wednesday afternoons. In January 1923, the library moved to the back of W.J. Pitman's music and piano store on Third Avenue. Access to the library was possible during business hours.

In 1936, the Prince George Public Library Commission was formed, and the collection was moved into a room next to the Fire Hall in the Ritts-Kifer building on George Street. Books could be borrowed three afternoons each week.

In March 1949, the City of Prince George provided space for the library to expand into a former army building at 425 Brunswick Street.

A plebiscite on June 18, 1955 resulted in the library attaining professional status, and the Commission became the Prince George Library Board. The City of Prince George passed Bylaw 801 to establish the Municipal Public Library on June 20, 1955. The first professional librarian, Mr. C.W. (Bill) Fraser) was appointed. At the time, the library had 6,800 books, a budget of $1,400 and a part time staff of three. The library became part of the North Central Associated Libraries system.

In 1960, City council commissioned a new 6,100 square foot library building, designed by architect Trelle Morrow. The new building was completed next to the old army facility. The connecting door was breached and the library collection was wheeled over the threshold to the new premises. The new library officially opened on September 6, 1961.

In 1962, Anne Scott was appointed librarian. By this time, there were two additional full time staff and six part time assistants. Magazines, paperback books and story hours were introduced

In 1975, the Nechako Library became a branch of the Prince George Library when the Hart neighbourhood amalgamated with the City of Prince George.

== Bob Harkins Branch ==
The downtown library remained at 425 Brunswick Street until it moved to the current building in 1981. Replacing Trelle Morrow's cramped 1960 building, the 1981 facility was 2.5 times larger and was praised for modernizing the city's civic infrastructure.

The new building was designed by Graham Tudor as the final result of an architectural competition. Tudor was also involved in the design of Toronto City Hall, the B.C. Tel building ("The Boot"), the Price Waterhouse Centre, and the ICBC building in North Vancouver. Like the Prince George Public Library, these Late Modernist and Brutalist structures feature bold geometric silhouettes, distinctive vertical ribs, prominent glass curtain walls, and a heavy reliance on poured or precast sculptural concrete. Designed as corporate and civic landmarks, they reflect the rapid urban expansion of Canadian cities during this era.

Tudor’s winning library proposal was originally intended to sit adjacent to a grand, elevated public plaza connected to a broader civic and arts complex. However, when voters defeated a referendum to fund the adjacent art gallery and theater, the elevated plaza was scrapped, leaving the library's main entry point sitting awkwardly high above ground level. Although this isolated, elevated block created immediate pedestrian entry and accessibility issues, the expanded capacity of the new facility nevertheless resulted in a dramatic increase in library usage.

The branch was named after Bob Harkins after his death in 2001. Mr. Harkins was a broadcaster, journalist, city councillor, library trustee, and a prominent volunteer in the community.

In 2019–2020, Chernoff Thompson Architects redesigned the main entrance, constructing a street-level enclosure and elevator system to improve public access. The branch houses the library's local history collection, administrative offices, and main circulating collections.

=== Location ===
The building is located in downtown Prince George, at 888 Canada Games Way. It is attached to the Prince George Conference and Civic Centre, across the street from the Prince George Coliseum.

== Nechako Branch ==
The Nechako Library was built in 1971 by the Hart Highway community as a centennial project. The first location was in a portable on South Kelly Road. In 1974, the Nechako library owned 715 books and had an additional 4,500 books on loan from the Library Development Commission. The 2,000 square foot library was open for 25 hours per week

When the Hart Community amalgamated with the City of Prince George in 1975, the Nechako Library became a branch of the Prince George Public Library. In 1980, the building was moved across the road to the grounds of Kelly Road Secondary School, where it remained until the summer of 1995. The Nechako branch officially re-opened in the Hart Shopping Centre on Sept 9, 1995 where it continues to serve the Hart Highlands community

=== Location ===
The Nechako branch is located at 6547 Hart Highway, in the Hart Shopping Centre.

== Library in the news ==
In 2014, an elderly gentleman walked into a Prince George library branch and returned a copy of "Camping and Woodcraft: A Handbook for Vacation Campers and for Travelers" that he had borrowed from a Vancouver Island Regional Library branch over 30 years before. The book was returned to its original library in Courtenay, BC.
