= Enbridge Northern Gateway Pipelines =

Proposed pipeline in Canada

Northern Gateway West Line

Location
- Country: Canada
- Province: Alberta; British Columbia
- Direction: West
- Start: Bruderheim, Alberta
- To: Kitimat, British Columbia

General information
- Type: Diluted bitumen
- Owner: Enbridge

Technical information
- Length: 1,177 km (731 mi)
- Maximum discharge: 0.525 million barrels per day (~2.62×10^{7} t/a)
- Diameter: 36 in (914 mm)

Northern Gateway East Line

Location
- Country: Canada
- Province: British Columbia; Alberta
- Direction: East
- Start: Kitimat, British Columbia
- To: Bruderheim, Alberta

General information
- Type: Natural Gas Condensate
- Owner: Enbridge

Technical information
- Length: 1,177 km (731 mi)
- Maximum discharge: 193,000 barrels (30,700 m^{3}) of condensate per day
- Diameter: 20 in (508 mm)

The Enbridge Northern Gateway Pipelines were a planned-but-never-built project for a twin pipeline from Bruderheim, Alberta, to Kitimat, British Columbia. The project was active from the mid-2000s to 2016. The eastbound pipeline would have imported natural gas condensate, and the westbound pipeline would have exported diluted bitumen from the Athabasca oil sands to a marine terminal in Kitimat for transportation to Asian markets via oil tankers. The project would have also included terminal facilities with "integrated marine infrastructure at tidewater to accommodate loading and unloading of oil and condensate tankers, and marine transportation of oil and condensate." The CA$7.9-billion project was first proposed in the mid-2000s but was postponed several times. The project plan was developed by Enbridge Inc., a Canadian crude oil and liquids pipeline and storage company.

When completed, the pipeline and terminal would have provided 104 permanent operating positions created within the company and 113 positions with the associated marine services. First Nations groups, many municipalities, including the Union of BC Municipalities, environmentalists and oil sands opponents, among others, denounced the project because of the environmental, economic, social and cultural risks posed by the pipeline. Proponents argued that the pipeline would have provided Indigenous communities with equity ownership, employment, community trust and stewardship programs. The Federal Court of Appeal ultimately ruled that consultation with First Nations was inadequate and overturned the approval.

The proposal was heavily criticized by Indigenous peoples. Groups like the Yinka Dene Alliance organized to campaign against the project. In December 2010, 66 First Nations bands in British Columbia, including many along the proposed pipeline route, signed the Save the Fraser Declaration in opposition to the project, and 40 more signed since that time. The proposal was also opposed by numerous non-governmental organizations, which cite previous spills, concerns over oil sands expansion, and associated risks in transportation.

In June 2014 the Northern Gateway pipeline project was approved by the federal government, subject to 209 conditions. In 2015 the CBC questioned the silence concerning the Northern Gateway project and suggested that Enbridge might have quietly shelved the project. In June 2016, the Federal Court of Appeal rescinded the project approval, sending it back to Cabinet. On 29 November 2016 the Cabinet officially rejected reapproval for the pipelines despite recommendations by the court. In June 2019, the revised pipeline approval process (Bill C-69) was passed to comply with the ruling. The Trans Mountain Expansion Project (TMX) received final federal approval on June 18, 2019, following a re-evaluation process which effectively replaced the project with a more viable alternative.

In January 2025, following threats of economic sanctions by the United States under President Trump, the project was raised by former supporters and detractors as a way to diversify Canadian energy export customers. However, Enbridge has not expressed any interest in reviving the pipeline.

== History ==
The project was proposed in the mid-2000s and was postponed several times. It was announced in 2006. Enbridge signed a cooperation agreement with PetroChina in 2005 to ensure the utilization of pipeline capacity. PetroChina agreed to buy about 200,000 barrels per day (32,000 m^{3}/d) transported through the pipeline. In 2007, however, PetroChina withdrew from the projects because of delays in starting the project.

On 4 December 2009, the National Energy Board (NEB) and the Canadian Environmental Assessment Agency (CEAA) issued the Joint Review Panel Agreement and the terms of reference for the environmental and regulatory review of the Northern Gateway Pipelines.

Enbridge Northern Gateway submitted its project application to the NEB on 27 May 2010. The eight-volume regulatory application was assessed by a joint review panel (JRP) established by the CEAA and the NEB. On 19 January 2011, the JRP requested that Enbridge provide additional information on the design and risk assessment of the pipelines due to the difficult access and unique geographic location of the proposed project.

On 17 June 2014 the Canadian government accepted the project's proposal. It set out 209 conditions, identified in 2013 by a JRP, to be resolved during the next phase of the regulatory process.

On 6 May 2016, Enbridge filed a request with the NEB to extend the sunset clause for the Northern Gateway Project. The sunset clause (NEB Condition No. 2) stipulated that construction had to begin before 31 December 2016.

In June 2016, the Federal Court of Appeal recinded the approval over inadequate and irrregular consultion with First Nations. This followed a less binding finding by the BC Supreme Court in January 2016 that the project had failed to consult adequately. This highlighted problems with the Bill C-38 and Bill C-45 pipeline approval process and led to revisions in Bill C-69 to make the process compliant with the courts ruling.

== Technical description ==
The planned project consisted of two parallel pipelines between an inland terminal at Bruderheim, Alberta, and a marine terminal in Kitimat, British Columbia, each with a length of 1,177 kilometres (731 mi). Crude oil produced from oil sands would have been transported from Bruderheim to Kitimat, while natural-gas condensate would have moved in the opposite direction. Condensate would have been used as a diluent in oil refining to decrease the viscosity of heavy crude oil from oil sands, and to make it easier to transport by pipelines. About 520 kilometres (320 mi) of pipeline would have run in Alberta and 657 kilometres (408 mi) in British Columbia. The crude oil pipeline would have had a diameter of 36 inches (910 mm) and a capacity of 525,000 barrels per day (83,500 m^{3}/d). The condensate pipeline would have had a diameter of 20 inches (510 mm) with a capacity of 193,000 barrels per day (30,700 m^{3}/d). In 2008 Enbridge expected these pipelines to be completed by 2015. The project, including a marine terminal in Kitimat, was expected to cost CA$7.9 billion. The Kitimat terminal would have comprised two tanker berth platforms, one serving very large crude carriers and another serving Suezmax-type condensate tankers. The terminal would have included oil and condensate tanks and a pump station.

== Environmental assessment ==
As an inter-provincial pipeline, the project required a public regulatory review process conducted by JRP. The JRP provided a joint environmental assessment and regulatory process that contributed to decision making. The first session of JRP was held on 10 January 2012, in Kitamaat Village, British Columbia.

Other types of studies, such as socioeconomic assessments, were also necessary prior to project approval.

== Competing projects ==
Kinder Morgan Energy Partners operates the 1,150-kilometre-long (710 mi) Trans Mountain Pipeline System from Edmonton, Alberta, to terminals and refineries in central British Columbia, the Vancouver area and the Puget Sound region in Washington, United States. In 2012 the company wanted to increase the pipeline's capacity by twelve times, up to 600,000 barrels per day (95,000 m^{3}/d). According to Kinder Morgan, expanding the existing pipeline would have been cheaper than Northern Gateway and avoided opposition as experienced by the Enbridge's project.

As an alternative, some indigenous groups proposed Eagle Spirit Pipeline from northern Alberta to the Prince Rupert area on the BC coasts. Many indigenous people wanted the economic activity from construction and operation of pipelines to improve conditions of their members.

Another project to export crude oil from western Canada was the XL expansion of TransCanada's Keystone pipeline, which supplies heavy oil to refineries on the US Gulf Coast.

And the Energy East pipeline would have transported oil to refineries in Montreal and the Maritime provinces, which import oil from the Bakken formation in Montana and North Dakota by railway, as well as from overseas by ship. However, project proponent TC Energy cancelled the pipeline in the face of political objections and concerns over economic viability.

== Opposition ==
=== BC NDP ===
BC NDP leader Adrian Dix promised to pull B.C. out of the federal review process if his party was elected in spring 2013 (which it was not), while also hiring prominent constitutional lawyer Murray Rankin to consider a legal challenge on who had jurisdiction over pipelines. Rankin argued that British Columbia should withdraw from the federal government's pipelines review process and set up a made-in-B.C. environmental assessment. In an August 2012 NDP press conference Rankin argued that "a made-in-B.C. review would ensure that B.C.'s economic, social and environmental interests are fully addressed, that B.C.'s powers and responsibilities are properly exercised and that First Nations' interests are recognized within the new process". In response Dix said "Within a week of taking office, we will serve the federal government with 30 days' notice to terminate the 2010 deal in which the Liberals signed away B.C.'s interests."

This policy was blamed for the poor election result for the NDP in 2013. The NDP won nearly every coastal riding in the 2013 British Columbia general election - so it could be argued that there was a division between those who lived in the path of potential environmental harm, and those who lived away from the area. The NDP had been seen as the heavy favourites, until shortly after they clarified their pipeline policy.

=== First Nations/Aboriginal groups ===
Aboriginal groups' main concern was that the pipeline might spill and pollute the Fraser River. Many Aboriginal groups opposed the Northern Gateway pipeline proposal, though some others signed agreements supporting it. Enbridge and some Aboriginal groups disagreed on the extent of this support and opposition. Several coalitions and alliances produced formal declarations unequivocally rejecting the intrusion of an oil pipeline on aboriginal lands. These included Yinka Dene Alliance, Heiltsuk Nation, Coastal First Nations, and Save the Fraser. The Wet'suwet'en First Nation opposed the pipeline, as well as many Dakelh First Nations including the Saik'uz First Nation.

The JRP travelled to the Heiltsuk Nation in April 2012 for hearings into the pipeline proposal. "By some counts, a third of Bella Bella's 1,095 residents were on the street that day, one of the largest demonstrations in the community's history." Facing non-violent protest as part of the greeting at the airport, the JRP members suspended the hearings for a day and a half. While the hearings did resume, substantial time had been lost, meaning fewer people could present to the JRP than had planned.

"As the young people of the community explained when they finally got the chance, their health and identity were inextricably bound up in their ability to follow in the footsteps of their forebears - fishing and paddling in the same waters, collecting kelp in the same tidal zones in the outer coastal islands, hunting in the same forests, and collecting medicines in the same meadows. Which is why Northern Gateway was seen not simply as a threat to the local fishery but as the possible undoing of all this intergenerational healing work. And therefore as another wave of colonial violence."

=== Environmental advocates ===
The Dogwood Initiative, ForestEthics, the International League of Conservation Photographers, and Greenpeace Canada were some organizations that actively campaigned against the Enbridge pipeline proposal.

== Issues ==
=== Impact on Indigenous peoples ===
The proposal was opposed by Indigenous groups. Groups like the Yinka Dene Alliance were organized to campaign against the project. First Nations bands in British Columbia, including many along the proposed pipeline route, signed the Save-the-Fraser Declaration in opposition to the project.

The Save-the-Fraser Declaration was signed by numerous indigenous tribes, declaring opposition to oil pipelines through First Nation traditional territories. It was signed by more than 130 First Nations.

In 2013 Enbridge offered a 10% equity stake in the $5.5-billion proposed project, over the following 30 years, to participating aboriginal groups. As well, Enbridge said it would put one per cent of Northern Gateway's pre-tax earnings into a trust, which was expected to generate $100 million over 30 years for non-Aboriginal as well as Aboriginal groups. The company said it expected roughly 15 per cent of the proposed project's construction labour force to be aboriginal.

In 2012, without naming individual bands, Enbridge said that 70% of the affected First Nations had signed onto the deal. However, no band whose land was being directly traversed by the pipeline had signed on.

Enbridge offerings were expected to create more division amongst first nations, as was the case with Enbridge's announcement in 2011 of support by the Gitxsan hereditary chiefs, in exchange for $7 million. However, this deal was quickly overturned following the closure of the Gitxsan Treaty Society Office by opponents of the deal. The Enbridge deal was subsequently rejected in writing by 45 Gitxsan chiefs, who claimed that the office had misrepresented the Gitxsan people. Only one chief in BC publicly supported the proposed pipeline, Chief Elmer Derrick. Derrick was the chief negotiator for the Gitxsan Treaty Society before its closure in 2011. Derrick was later dismissed as chief negotiator for the GTS.

Several First Nations (including the Haisla, Gitgaʼat, Haida, Gitxaała, Wetʼsuwetʼen, Nadleh Whutʼen, Nakʼazdli Whutʼen, and Takla Lake) publicly stated (via the JRP or in the media) that neither the Crown nor the established assessment process for Enbridge's project had adequately met their duty to consult and accommodate, or respect their Aboriginal rights and title.

=== Impact on economy ===
Wright Mansell Research Ltd, in their analysis of the project, concluded that the project "would be a catalyst for the generation of substantial and widely distributed economic stimulus for Canada and a significant contributor to sustaining Canadian growth and prosperity for many years into the future. While the benefits of greater flexibility, adaptability and opportunity for the Canadian petroleum sector, through market expansion and diversification, have not been quantified, they are also real and important. Further, the cost benefit analysis indicates that, taking into account all benefits and costs, including cost expectations from oil spills, there is a large and robust net social benefit associated with the project from a national Canadian perspective."

A report put forth by economist and former Insurance Corporation of BC CEO, Robyn Allan, in early 2012, took assumptions of Wright Mansell Research Ltd's analysis into question – stating that this proposed pipeline could have actually hurt non-oil based sectors of the Canadian economy. Allan stated in the report that the project's success depended on continual yearly oil price increases, by about $3/barrel. She also stated that an increase in oil prices would have led to "a decrease in family purchasing power, higher prices for industries who use oil as an input into their production process, higher rates of unemployment in non-oil industry related sectors, a decline in real GDP, a decline in government revenues, an increase in inflation, an increase in interest rates and further appreciation of the Canadian dollar."

=== Tanker moratorium in British Columbia ===
There was an informal moratorium on large tanker traffic in Dixon Entrance, Hecate Strait, and the Queen Charlotte Sound from 1972 to 2019. While this was by BC, not Canada, it effectively banned all tanker traffic with no exception. Since then, the federal and provincial governments have commissioned periodic studies to reassess whether to lift the tanker moratorium. Each study has concluded that the risk of tanker spills is too high. In 2003–2004, the federal government initiated a three-part review process, including a scientific review by the Royal Society of Canada (the RSC report), a First Nations engagement process (the Brooks Report), and a public review process (the Priddle Panel). The RSC report concluded that "the present restriction on tanker traffic along the West Coast of British Columbia should be maintained for the time being"

In 2009, the Canadian government's position was that there is no moratorium on tanker traffic in the coast waters of British Columbia. However, on 7 December 2010, Canada's environmental watchdog (Scott Vaughan, commissioner of the environment and sustainable development) said "Canada's government is not ready to handle a major oil spill from a tanker, in part because its emergency response plan is out of date".

In December 2010, the House of Commons passed a non-binding motion to ban bulk oil tanker traffic in the Dixon Entrance, Hecate Strait and Queen Charlotte Sound.

In November 2015, Prime Minister Trudeau's mandate letter to the Minister of Transport directed that the moratorium be formalized. The Oil Tanker Moratorium Act went into effect in June 2019. Unlike the BC informal tanker ban, the federal legislation allows for ministerial exceptions for specific sites and tankers, if evidence shows it is safe enough. This might apply to deep water ports such as Prince Rupert where access to the ocean is open.

=== Public opinion ===
Multiple public opinion surveys, sponsored by Enbridge, Ethical Oil and other oil interests, were conducted on the Northern Gateway pipeline. An Abacus Data survey released in January 2012 for Sun Media found that 38% of Canadians were in support of building the pipeline, while 29% were opposed. Another 33% said they neither supported nor opposed the pipeline.

Another survey conducted by Forum Research in mid-January 2012 found that the share of Canadians who opposed the pipeline had fallen to 43%, from 51% in a December survey. Support for the project remained stable (at 37%, up within margin of error from 35%). 20% were undecided (up from 15% in December).

In British Columbia, a March 2012 survey by Mustel Group reported increased opposition to the Enbridge proposal. In their B.C.-wide telephone survey sponsored by Kennedy Stewart (New Democrat MP), opposition had grown to 42%, from 32% in an Ipsos-Reid online survey sponsored by Enbridge in December 2011. However, because their methodologies and context differed, the reported growth in opposition was difficult to substantiate. Ipsos-Reid conducted an online custom survey for Enbridge. Mustel Group included a single question on a shared-cost omnibus telephone survey, the same survey used in their political polling.

Justason Market Intelligence released a poll in March 2012 that focused on the role of tankers in this pipeline proposal. The poll found 66% of B.C. residents opposed to Enbridge's proposal to transport oil through British Columbia's inside coastal waters, including 50% who registered strong disapproval.

An April 2012 survey by Forum Research showed an increase in opposition among B.C. residents to 52% from 46% reported by Forum Research in January. In January, Forum polled 1,211 residents from across Canada; B.C. was a smaller subsample of that national poll. In April, Forum polled 1,069 British Columbians. The B.C. sample size for the January poll was not provided.

=== Political issues ===
The issue of the pipeline was a subject of controversy between the governments of Alberta and British Columbia, starting in 2011 when the Alberta government under Premier Alison Redford began pressuring BC to support the pipeline. In an 8 March speech to a "conservative family reunion" hosted by Preston Manning in Ottawa, BC Premier Christy Clark stated that "we support pipelines in British Columbia" (referring to liquid natural gas) but that she was not yet convinced of the benefits of the Northern Gateway scheme.

Following the Kalamazoo River oil spill on Enbridge Pipeline 6B in Michigan, the BC government stated five requirements to be addressed prior to supporting any heavy oil pipeline proposal:

- Successful completion of the environmental review process. In the case of Enbridge, that meant a recommendation by the NEB JRP that the project proceed;
- World-leading marine oil spill response, prevention and recovery systems for B.C.'s coastline and ocean to manage and mitigate the risks and costs of heavy oil pipelines and shipments;
- World-leading practices for land oil spill prevention, response and recovery systems to manage and mitigate the risks and costs of heavy oil pipelines;
- Legal requirements regarding Aboriginal and treaty rights are addressed, and First Nations are provided with the opportunities, information and resources necessary to participate in and benefit from a heavy-oil project; and,
- British Columbia receives a fair share of the fiscal and economic benefits of a proposed heavy oil project that reflects the level, degree and nature of the risk borne by the province, the environment and taxpayers.

BC premier Christy Clark in 2012 boycotted a national energy strategy among the Canadian premiers stating "until we see some progress in the discussions between British Columbia, Alberta and the federal government with respect to the Gateway pipeline through British Columbia, we will not be participating in the discussion of a national energy strategy." This was likely over concerns that BC would receive a $6.1-billion share of a project that was expected to earn $81 billion in government revenues over 30 years, while footing a majority of the risk.

In July 2012 Clark said no to the proposed pipeline, unless Alberta entered negotiations with BC on revenue sharing. "If Alberta is not willing to even sit down and talk, then it stops here," she said. This is in response to the disproportionate risk that BC would have to take on with this pipeline.

== See also ==
- Alberta Clipper pipeline – Oil pipeline through Canada and the U.S.
- Coastal GasLink pipeline – Natural gas pipeline in Canada
- Enbridge Pipeline System – Canada–US oil pipeline
- Heiltsuk – Indigenous people of Central Coast, British Columbia, Canada
- Trans Mountain pipeline – Oil pipeline in southwestern Canada
- Eagle Spirit Pipeline – Proposed pipeline in Western Canada
- On the Line (2011 film)
