= Irving Oil Refinery =

Canadian oil refinery in Saint John, New Brunswick

- Aerial view of the refinery in 2025

- Location within New Brunswick
- Location: Saint John, New Brunswick, New Brunswick, Canada; 45°16′44″N 66°0′45″W

Refinery details
- Operator: Irving Oil
- Opened: 1960
- Capacity: 320,000 barrels per day (51,000 m^{3}/d)
- No. of employees: 1,600+

The Irving Oil Refinery is a Canadian oil refinery located in Saint John, New Brunswick. It is currently the largest oil refinery in Canada, capable of processing more than 320,000 barrels (51,000 m^{3}) of crude oil per day. Over 80 per cent of the production is exported to the United States, accounting for 19 per cent of the country's gasoline imports and 75 per cent of Canada's gasoline exports to the US.

The refinery is owned and operated by Irving Oil Limited Refining Division, a subsidiary company of Irving Oil.

== History ==
The refinery was built in 1960 as a partnership between Irving Oil and Standard Oil Co. of California (SOCAL, today known as Chevron) on a 780-acre (320 ha) site in Saint John, New Brunswick. It was built to allow for expansions, the first of which occurred in 1971 and then again in 1974. In 2000, a larger, $1.5 billion upgrade was completed. Irving Oil bought out SOCAL's share in the late 1980s. In 2000, New Brunswick New Democratic Party leader Elizabeth Weir released documents accessed under the Right to Information Act surrounding the refinery upgrades being put in motion by the government without being completely assessed for its environmental impact, suggesting that the government "ignored the public interest and pandered to big business."

The refinery is supplied with crude oil primarily delivered by supertankers to the company's Canaport deep-water terminal which was commissioned in 1970; prior to 1970, crude oil was delivered to the refinery through a much smaller terminal located on Courtney Bay immediately north of the Saint John Shipbuilding property. After Canaport opened, this terminal was converted to exclusively export the refinery's output. Irving has historically processed a mix of Saudi-supplied crude oil, according to import records this Saudi supply ranged from a high of 127,630 bpd in 2018 and a low of 63,024 bpd in 2012. In 2011 the refinery built a rail terminal for receiving crude oil; the refinery is served by tracks owned by Canadian National but which are operated by New Brunswick Southern Railway.

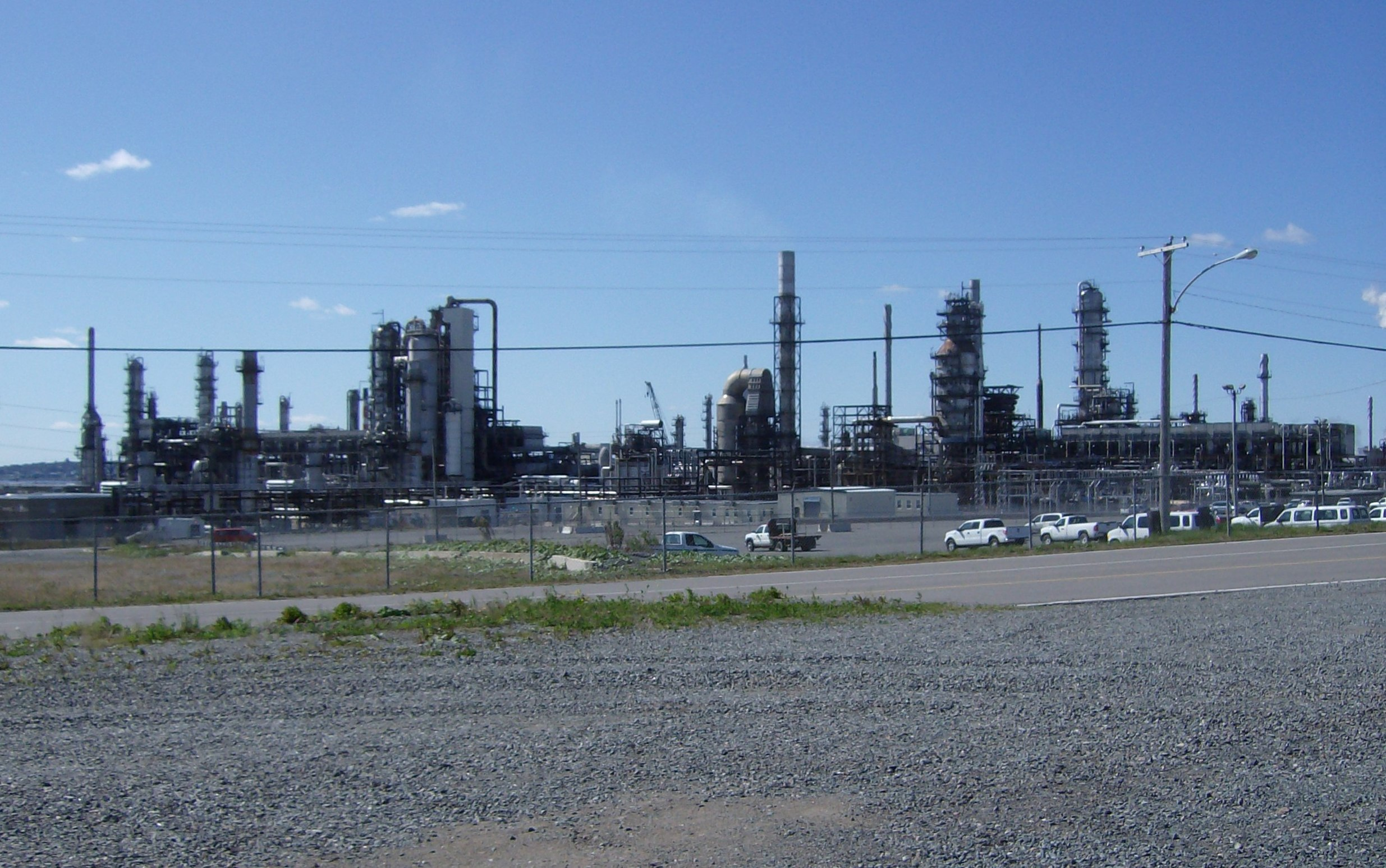
The refinery in 2012

In July 2010, Irving Oil cancelled plans for an $8-billion project, known as Eider Rock, which would have seen a second refinery built south of Saint John adjacent to the Canaport property with its partner BP. Irving and BP claimed "the demand for refined fuel had dropped and the capital costs of a new refinery were higher than expected." Construction had been scheduled to start in 2011 and at its peak, the refinery project was predicted to create 5,000 construction jobs and 1,000 permanent jobs. In February 2011, Fort Reliance Co. Ltd., Irving Oil Ltd.'s parent company, also cancelled its $30-million project to build a new headquarters at Long Wharf on property owned by the Port of Saint John.

In 2015, Irving Oil said it was no longer importing Bakken shale oil, but was taking cheaper crudes from Saudi Arabia.

It came to light because of the 2019 Abqaiq–Khurais attack that virtually all the 115,000 barrels per day of imported Saudi oil that is processed in Canada is processed at the Irving oil refinery. Canada accounted for 1.5 per cent of exports from Saudi Arabia in 2018, when the refinery produced from Saudi oil one-third of its total output.

In 2024, Irving's long-standing CEO stepped down as the company was undergoing a strategic review that would impact the future of the refinery. The company has been public in the review including a new owner or ownership structure.

=== Proposed pipeline ===
In July 2013 TC PipeLines announced a proposal to build the Energy East pipeline. This followed a February 2013 meeting between New Brunswick Premier David Alward and Alberta Premier Alison Redford, whereby New Brunswick announced its support for Alberta's call to export landlocked oil sands crude oil bitumen.

Getting Alberta crude oil to tidewater, such as the Canaport facility, would provide access to overseas markets using oil tankers whereby the oil would presumably command a higher price using the international Brent Crude index than it currently does in the western United States using the West Texas Intermediate index. Premier Redford described the Irving Oil refinery as an "anchor ... with the possibility of also exporting some of that crude by tanker."

In October 2017, Irving Oil's joint venture partner, TransCanada, announced it will be terminating the Energy East pipeline project as a result of changing circumstances around the project.

== Units ==
The Refinery is large and moderately complex with 300,000 bpd of capacity. It is Canada's largest. According to the company's submission to Oil and Gas Journal, the units present at the refinery with their capacities (2018) are:

Units	Capacity in BPCD
Total Nameplate of Refinery	300,000
Atmospheric Distillation	300,000
Vacuum Distillation	100,000
Vsibreaking/Thermal Cracking	20,000
Catalytic Cracking	95,000
Naphtha Reforming	35,000
Diesel Hydrocracker	34,000
Naphtha Hydrotreating	48,000
Jet Hydrotreating	30,000
Other (gasoil) Hydrotreating	14,000
Alkylation	16,000
Aromatics Extraction	10,000
Hydrogen Production in mmscf/d	47

The original refinery has been expanded with several new units over the years. A large capital investment program in excess of $1 billion was executed around 2000, including the "King of Cats" construction of a new residual oil Fluid Cat Cracker. The refinery is dual-train with 2 crude units and 2 FCCs. The refinery also was the first user of CDTech's CDHydro and CDHDS technologies for removing sulfur from cat cracked naphtha as part of its King of Cats project.

Irving is an early adopter of green hydrogen and has implemented a 5 MW electrolyzer to supplement the existing hydrogen plant.

The refinery is classified as moderately complex with a Nelson Complexity Index of 8.24.

== Emissions performance ==
=== Greenhouse gas emissions ===
According to filings made with the Government of Canada, the refinery emits roughly 3 million tons per year of CO_{2}.

Note all data below can be found publicly at the Government of Canada's environment website.

Year Recorded	Emissions (tonnes CO_{2} equivalent)
2022	2,964,365
2021	3,066,118
2020	3,142,347
2019	2,982,148
2018	2,624,256
2017	3,081,407
2016	3,005,645
2015	2,965,253
2014	2,805,495
2013	2,994,615
2012	2,999,406
2011	3,104,396
2010	2,918,595
2009	2,931,754
2008	2,982,142
2007	3,041,152
2006	2,964,215
2005	3,280,284
2004	3,264,277

== Refinery accidents and mishaps ==
=== Chronology of refinery fires, explosions, and major spills ===
The refinery has experienced several fires and explosions in its history, including the following from public sources:

2018 - Explosion and fire shut Irving Oil refinery in Saint John, Canada Irving was fined $200,000 for this explosion due to 80 workers being impacted by the fire.

=== Rail accidents ===
On 6 July 2013, a train carrying crude oil from the Bakken Formation in North Dakota destined for the Irving Refinery derailed in Lac-Mégantic, Quebec, causing an explosion in the town center of Lac-Mégantic and killing 47 people.

On 7 January 2014, another train carrying crude from Manitoba to the Irving Refinery derailed in Plaster Rock. This derailment caused explosions and fireballs and forced 150 people to evacuate their homes but did not cause any injuries.
