= Yinka Dene Alliance =

The Yinka Dene Alliance was a coalition of six First Nations from northern British Columbia, organized to prevent the Enbridge Northern Gateway Pipelines being built through their traditional territories. The coalition first comprised the Nadleh Whut'en, Nak'azdli, Takla Lake, Saik'uz and Wet'suwet'en First Nations. The Tl'azt'en First Nation later joined. These bands represented the interests of around 5,000 aboriginals. The alliance was active from 2010 until 2016 when the pipeline project was cancelled. They utilized indigenous, Canadian and international law, and organized various public protests across Canada.

== Opposition to Enbridge Northern Gateway Pipelines ==
The Northern Gateway project was a proposal by Enbridge Inc. to build a twin pipeline between Bruderheim, Alberta, and Kitimat, British Columbia. The pipeline would have carried natural gas condensate to Bruderheim and crude oil to Kitimat, where it would have been transported to Asia by oil tankers. The Yinka Dene Alliance, and many other First Nations groups, opposed the project because of the threat it posed to the environment, their ways of life, and their land rights.

The pipelines would have crossed nearly 800 streams and rivers, and oil tankers would have had to navigate rough waters and jagged coasts. A pipe leak or oil tanker spill – which the Yinka Dene Alliance deemed "inevitable" – could devastate the water supply, imperiling the ecosystem and local communities' health. This posed a clear economic and cultural threat as well, since their ways of life depended on the waters, most notably through their fishing of the salmon population.

The Yinka Dene Alliance also opposed the project as a matter of land rights. The project would have traversed around 50 First Nations' territories, much of which had never formally been ceded. Land title is still being negotiated through the BC Treaty Process. The Yinka Dene Alliance, whose traditional territories made up 25% of the land directly affected by the Northern Gateway project, argued that Enbridge had no legal right to proceed without First Nations' approval. However, based on the 1997 Delgamuukw case, the Supreme Court of Canada disagreed. According to Canadian law, the First Nations must be consulted, which happened through the project's Joint Review Panel and through private negotiations between Enbridge and First Nations, but they do not have the power to veto. The Yinka Dene Alliance did not participate in the Joint Review Panel public hearings, calling them "bogus" on the grounds that the Canadian government had already made up its mind to support the project.

== Save the Fraser Declaration ==
The Save the Fraser Declaration is a document of indigenous law, banning the Northern Gateway pipeline, and any similar projects, from crossing the signatories' territories. The signatories declare: "We will not allow the proposed Enbridge Northern Gateway Pipelines, or similar Tar Sands projects, to cross our lands, territories and watersheds, or the ocean migration routes of Fraser River Salmon."

The declaration was negotiated in November 2010 by the Yinka Dene Alliance and the St'át'imc Nation. It was then signed by representatives from over 60 First Nations, who called themselves the Save the Fraser Gathering of Nations.

On December 2, 2010, the declaration was made public. The group took out a full-page advertisement in The Globe and Mail announcing their opposition to the project, and staged a march in Vancouver to deliver the Declaration to the Enbridge headquarters.

Many new signatories were added in ceremonies in Vancouver on December 1, 2011, and Edmonton on January 27, 2012. Over 130 First Nations have now signed the Save The Fraser Declaration.

== Appeals to the international community ==
On February 6, 2012, the Yinka Dene Alliance released an open letter to Chinese President Hu Jintao. Canadian Prime Minister Stephen Harper was about to meet Hu to discuss Chinese investment and trade in Canadian energy, which the Northern Gateway project would have facilitated greatly. In the letter the Yinka Dene Alliance asked Hu to raise human rights concerns with Harper. They outlined a number of human rights issues concerning First Nations, including land rights, injustices in the judicial system, and the imposition of resource development projects like the Northern Gateway. On the same day, the Yinka Dene Alliance also released an open letter to the Chinese people, declaring their opposition to the Northern Gateway. In it they stated that an oil spill "could destroy the extremely rare spirit bear – a bear with white fur that is as beautiful as the Chinese panda bear".

The Yinka Dene Alliance also appealed to the United Nations Committee on the Elimination of Racial Discrimination. In February 2012 they submitted a request, calling on the Committee to intervene against the Northern Gateway project on the basis that it infringed Aboriginal title. The complaint also argued that the Canadian government was practising a type of racial discrimination by prioritizing Enbridge's interests over the First Nations', by propagating negative images in the media of the First Nations's opposition, and by classifying Aboriginal groups as "adversaries" in a confidential internal document. Anne Sam, from Nak'azdli First Nation, went to Geneva to speak to the committee as a representative of the Yinka Dene Alliance.

== Freedom Train ==
From April 30 to May 9, 2012, the Yinka Dene Alliance sent 30 representatives travelling across Canada on the so-called Freedom Train. The protest began with a rally in Jasper, Alberta, and continued with events in Edmonton, Saskatoon, Winnipeg and Toronto. The final event was a protest outside Enbridge's annual general meeting (AGM). Wet'suwet'en Chief Na'Moks, Nadleh Whut'en Chief Martin Louie and Saik'uz Chief Jackie Thomas attended the AGM itself.

== RCMP monitoring ==
In May 2012 it emerged that the Royal Canadian Mounted Police (RCMP) had been closely monitoring the Yinka Dene Alliance for signs of "acts of protest and civil disobedience". The RCMP unit gathered evidence from public and social media sources, and seemed to have also monitored private meetings. Chief Jackie Thomas, from the Saik'uz First Nation, said, "We've always been peaceful, but this is how they try to paint us as the enemy".
