= Tidewater (marketing) =

Tidewater is a term used by industries and governments to refer to access to ocean ports with international marine services for import and export of commodities. For export, the commodities can be shipped via trucks, trains and/or pipelines to a port, thereby opening the door to more lucrative prices on global markets. Getting to such a port is particularly important for landlocked jurisdictions seeking to expand and diversify markets for natural resources.

== Landlocked Athabasca oil sands ==
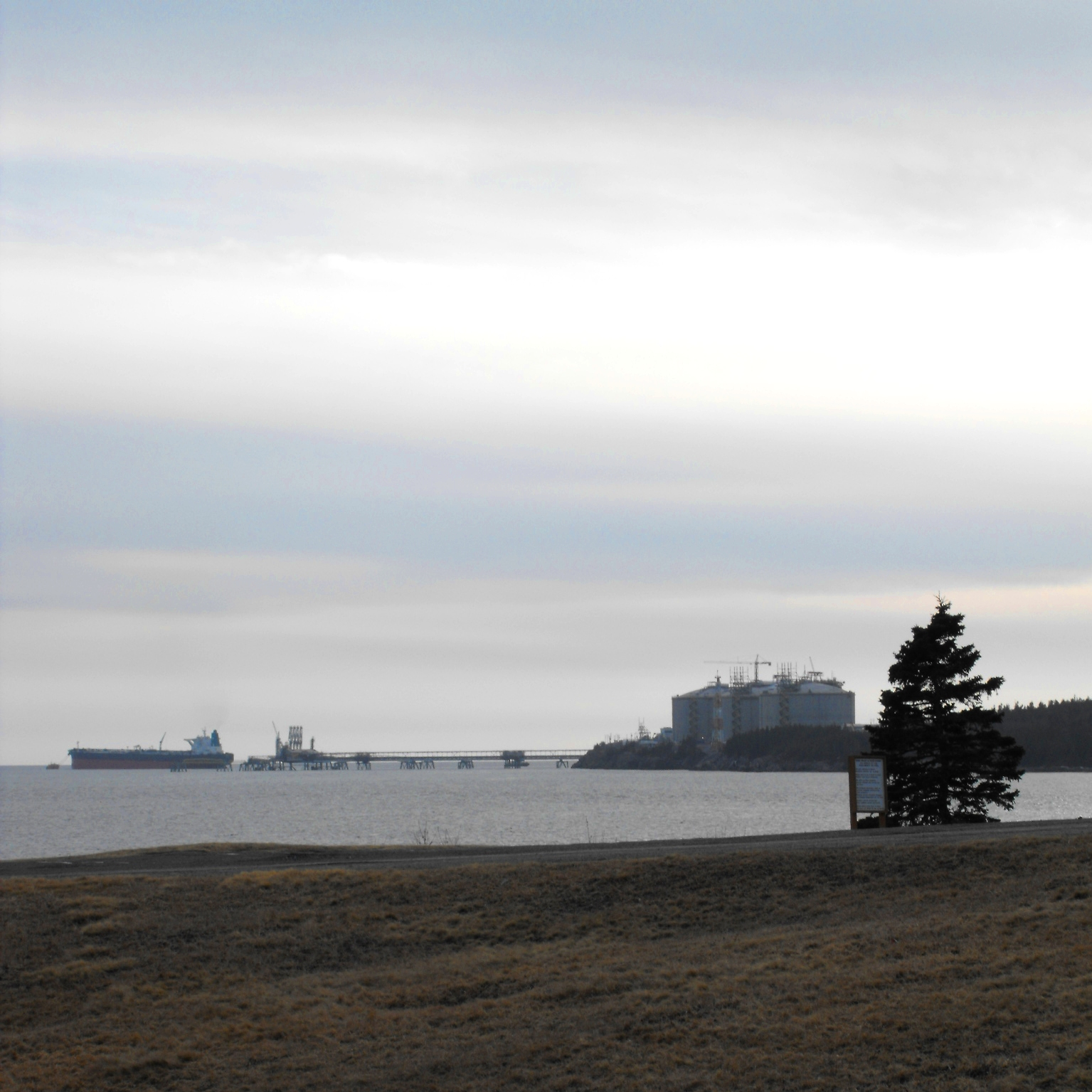
Canaport in New Brunswick, Canada is a tidewater petroleum facility

An example of the use of the term "tidewater" can be seen in the debate over exports of oil produced by the Athabasca oil sands. Upon separation from the sand, this bituminous oil, marketed as Western Canadian Select, is forced to sell at the price established for landlocked oil (see: West Texas Intermediate benchmark). If this oil were able to reach "tidewater" for export using oil tankers, it would presumably command a higher price (see: Brent Crude benchmark). Several pipelines have been proposed to bring the oil to "tidewater", including the Keystone XL project (via the Gulf of Mexico), the Enbridge Northern Gateway Pipelines project (via the British Columbia coast), the Mackenzie Valley Pipeline project (via the Beaufort Sea), or the Energy East pipeline project (via the Bay of Fundy). The Government of Alberta and the Government of Canada claimed a loss of $C4 – $C30 billion (CAD) in taxes and non-renewable natural resource royalties in 2013. In comparison, Maya crude oil,(Moore et al. 2011:2). a similar product to Western Canadian Select, but located close to tidewater, was reaching peak prices in early 2010s. In the United States, opponents of pipeline projects have expressed concern that pipeline construction and expansion would simply facilitate getting Alberta oil sands products to an American port for export to China and other countries via the Gulf of Mexico and that the resulting expansion in production in Alberta and consumption of fossil fuels worldwide would have a detrimental contribution to greenhouse gases. Canaport is a receiving terminal for crude oil and LNG. There is a proposal to expand it to allow the export of inland oil delivered via pipeline.

== See also ==
- Western Canadian Select
- Keystone Pipeline
- Alison Redford
- Ken Hughes
