= Eagle Spirit Pipeline =

Proposed pipeline in Western Canada

Location
- Country: Canada
- Province: Alberta and British Columbia
- Start: Northern Alberta
- To: Prince Rupert, British Columbia

General information
- Type: Oil
- Owner: Eagle Spirit Holdings LTD

Technical information
- Length: 1,500 km (930 mi)

The Eagle Spirit Pipeline was a $16-billion, First Nations-owned Canadian pipeline proposed in 2018 and 2019 by businessman Calvin Helin which would have shipped petroleum from Northern Alberta to Prince Rupert, British Columbia.

== Background ==
The Eagle Spirit Pipeline was a proposed alternative to the previous Northern Gateway Pipeline and Trans Mountain Pipeline. Helin claimed the project had 100% backing from First Nations groups and carried a low risk in comparison to previous pipeline proposals.

== Benefits ==
The project had the support of 35 First Nations groups, could have reduced emissions by 100 megatons and potentially have been safer than previous pipeline proposals. The pipeline was estimated to carry 4 million barrels per day (640,000 m^{3}/d) of oil and 10 billion cubic feet per day (280,000,000 m^{3}/d) of natural gas.

== Challenges ==
Barriers facing the project were National Energy Board approval, and the tanker ban implemented by the Justin Trudeau government and Bill C-48.

== See also ==
- Trans Mountain Pipeline
- Northern Gateway Pipeline
