= Trans Mountain pipeline =

Oil pipeline in southwestern Canada

Trans Mountain Pipeline (TMPL)
- Trans Mountain pipeline route from Edmonton to Burnaby

Location
- Country: Canada
- Province: Alberta and British Columbia
- Start: Edmonton, Alberta
- To: Burnaby, British Columbia

General information
- Type: Multiple product pipelines: crude oil, refined petroleum products such as jet fuel, gasoline, diesel
- Status: Operational – twinning completed May 1, 2024
- Owner: Trans Mountain Corporation (TMC) (Canada Development Investment Corporation)
- Commissioned: 1951

Technical information
- Length: 1,150 km (710 mi)
- Diameter: 610 mm (24 in)

The Trans Mountain Pipeline System, or simply the Trans Mountain Pipeline (TMPL), is a multiple product pipeline system which carries crude and refined products from Edmonton, Alberta, to the coast of British Columbia, Canada.

The corporation was created in 1951, construction began in 1952, and operations commenced in 1953. It is the only pipeline to run between these two areas. The construction of a second pipeline between Hinton, Alberta, and Hargreaves, British Columbia, running adjacent to the existing line, was completed in 2008. In 2013, a project to loop the existing Trans Mountain pipeline—the Trans Mountain Expansion Project—was proposed to the Canadian National Energy Board. The project was 98% complete as of 23 January 2024, and the expanded pipeline began operations on 1 May 2024. The expansion, which runs roughly parallel to the existing pipeline, increased capacity from 300,000 to 890,000 barrels per day (48,000–141,000 m^{3}/d), at a cost of C$53 billion.

The Trans Mountain Expansion Project was controversial due to its potential environmental impact. It faced legal challenges, as well as challenges from environmentalists and First Nations groups on the grounds of inadequate consultation of the pipeline route passing through unceded indigenous land. A Supreme Court decision on July 2, 2020, that rejected the appeals made by First Nations and environmental groups, "[brought] an end to the years-long legal challenge".

On August 31, 2018, the Government of Canada purchased the pipeline for $4.7 billion from Kinder Morgan through the creation of the Trans Mountain Corporation (TMC), in order to "keep the project alive". TMC is a Crown corporation, a subsidiary of the Canada Development Investment Corporation (CDEV). Until the purchase by CDEV, the Trans Mountain Pipeline was owned by the Houston–based pipeline operator's Canadian division.

== History ==
In February 1947, large oil deposits were discovered near Leduc, Alberta. The idea for a pipeline from Alberta to British Columbia quickly emerged, driven by the growing demand for oil both in Asia and on the west coast of Canada and the United States. One element seen as a benefit to the project were defence implications, with availability of oil infrastructure being beneficial to both the Canadian and US militaries.

On March 21, 1951, the Trans Mountain Pipeline Company Trans Mountain was created when the Canadian Parliament granted the company a charter under a special act of parliament. The proposal for the pipeline was immediately submitted to the Board of Transport Commissioners and was approved. Construction began in February 1952 and the final section was welded in place near Aldergrove, British Columbia on October 17, 1952. According to a 2019 JWN Energy series—Inside Canada's Pipeline Industry—by former editor of Oilweek, Gordon Jaremko, both the Board approval and the construction of the 1,150-kilometre (710 mi) pipeline were sped up as concerns about the Korean War mounted. The governments considered the TMPL to be a strategic way of reducing reliance on oil tankers, made vulnerable under threats of potential attack on the west coast of North America. Canadian Bechtel Ltd. was responsible for engineering, design, and construction of the project. Ownership of the company was split between Canadian Bechtel Ltd. and Standard Oil.

In August 1953, crude oil from Edmonton, Alberta, began flowing to refineries in the Vancouver area and the northwestern U.S. through TMPL. The total cost of TMPL was $93 million, according to then Premier of British Columbia W. A. C. Bennett at the opening ceremony. Prior to 1983, the only product TMPL carried was crude oil to supply refineries in the Vancouver area and to the state of Washington.

=== Shift from single to multiple products pipelines ===
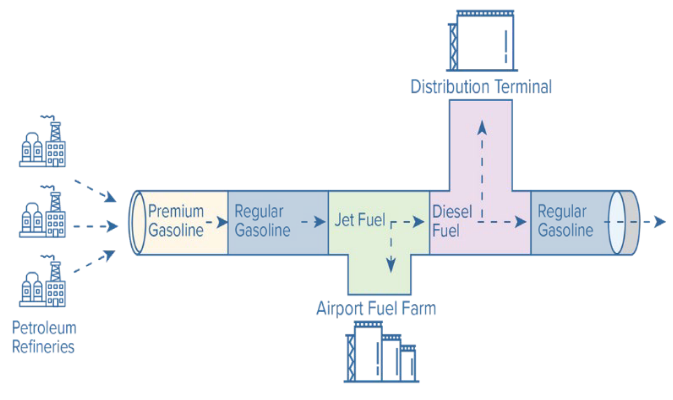
Pipelines may carry multiple products at the same time, in batches that are drawn off as they reach consumers some hours or days after injection.

In 1983, Trans Mountain began experiments to shift from single- to multiple-product pipelines to increase efficiency and to become more competitive. By 1985, TMPL regularly carried refined-products 820 kilometres (510 mi) from Edmonton to Kamloops, British Columbia. This had extended to Vancouver by 1993. A 1993 report said that the TMPL was the "only major system in the world" at that time, transporting both crude oil and refined petroleum products" in a single pipeline. By 1998, TMPL made regular shipments to Vancouver of refined petroleum products "including jet fuel, gasoline (unleaded and premium unleaded), diesel (regular sulphur, low sulphur, and low temperature), methyl tertiary butyl ether (MTBE), and crude-oil (light sweet, light sour, and heavy)".

In 2004, Kinder Morgan began the process of adding a second pipeline, running parallel to the first, for the portion running between Hinton, Alberta, and Hargreaves, British Columbia. That required building two more pumping stations–the Wolf Pump Station, near Niton Junction, Alberta, and the Chappel Pump Station, near Pyramid Creek Falls Provincial Park, British Columbia. Capacity was increased by 40,000 barrels per day (6,400 m^{3}/d): from 260,000 to 300,000 barrels per day (41,000 to 48,000 m^{3}/d).

=== TMPL and oil refineries ===
Shell, Petro-Canada, and Imperial closed refineries in British Columbia in the 1990s and expanded their refineries in the Edmonton area following the TMPL construction. TMPL had the capacity to carry refined products, as well as crude oil via the batch system. According to a 2016 Oil Sands Magazine article, this resulted in the conversion of existing refineries along the TMPL route into storage and distribution facilities and terminals. In 1983, Kamloops' Royalite Refinery, was shut down. In 1993, two refineries were closed—Shell's in North Burnaby, a large Vancouver neighbourhood—and Petro-Canada's in Port Moody which is 27 km (17 mi) east of Vancouver—were closed. In 1995, Imperial Oil closed their refinery in Port Moody—a city which is part of the Metro Vancouver Regional District. After TMX opened in 2024, oil refineries complained about poor oil quality.

=== Spill history ===
As of 2017, TMPL had reported approximately 84 spills to Canada's National Energy Board since 1961. Although a majority occurred at contained zones such as pumping stations, and a majority were below the mandatory reporting threshold of 1.5 cubic metres, there were some significant spill events.

In Abbotsford in 2005, a ruptured pipeline dumped 210 m^{3} (1,300 bbl) of crude oil. The company attributed the accident to activity on a neighbouring property. In 2007, in Burnaby, a contractor working on a sewage project for the city of Burnaby ruptured a pipeline, causing spillage of 224–234 m^{3} (1,410–1,470 bbl) of crude oil. Some of it flowed into Burrard Inlet via the Burnaby storm sewer system. Most of it was recovered. Eleven houses were sprayed with oil, and about 225–250 residents were evacuated or left voluntarily. Cleanup took more than a year. In 2009, in Burnaby 305 m^{3} (1,920 bbl) of crude oil were released from a tank at the Trans Mountain Burnaby Terminal. Most of it flowed into a containment area. In Sumas in 2012 90 m^{3} (570 bbl) of light crude oil leaked from a Sumas Mountain holding tank. All of it flowed into a containment area. In 2020, in Sumas, 190.0 m^{3} (1,195 bbl) of light crude leaked from small pipe connected to mainline. Trans Mountain reported on June 14 that the spill was contained on the property and that groundwater was monitored for contamination.

== Trans Mountain Expansion Project ==
Trans Mountain Pipeline, in green, with other Canadian Energy Regulator managed pipelines

On June 18, 2013, Kinder Morgan filed an application with the National Energy Board pursuant to Part III of the National Energy Board Act to build a second pipeline under the Trans Mountain Pipeline Expansion Project. The second pipeline was to run roughly parallel to the existing pipeline, between Edmonton and Burnaby (east of Vancouver) and to be used to transport diluted bitumen, also known as dilbit. The additional pipeline requires 12 new pumping stations. The proposed expansion, with 980 kilometres (610 mi) of pipe, would increase the system's capacity from 300,000 to 890,000 barrels per day (48,000 to 141,000 m^{3}/d). In 2013, the cost of completing the connection between Strathcona County and Burnaby was estimated at $6.8 billion.

Kinder Morgan had the support at the time of several large petroleum industry customers for the expansion (BP Canada Energy Trading Co., Canadian Natural Resources, Canadian Oil Sands Ltd., Cenovus Energy Inc., Devon Canada Corp., Husky Energy Marketing Inc., Imperial Oil Ltd., Nexen Marketing Inc., Statoil Canada Ltd., Suncor Energy Marketing Inc., Suncor Energy Products Partnership, Tesoro Refining & Marketing Co. and Total E&P Canada Ltd). In 2016, the B.C. government said it did not support Trans Mountain, partly because Kinder Morgan had not provided enough information about its proposed spill prevention and spill clean-up program. On November 29, 2016, the federal cabinet approved the expansion project, announcing that the approval was "subject to 157 binding conditions that will address potential Indigenous, socio-economic and environmental impacts, including project engineering, safety and emergency preparedness."

On January 11, 2017, B.C. Premier Christy Clark announced British Columbia's support for the expansion of the Trans Mountain pipeline, saying the project met her government's five conditions for approval and included a revenue-sharing agreement worth up to $1 billion. In 2018, the federal government created a Crown corporation, the Trans Mountain Corporation (TMC), when it bought the pipeline from the Houston-based Kinder Morgan for C$4.5 billion. The purchase had been announced by the federal government in May 2018. At that time, the government said it would seek outside investors to complete the expansion. These investors would also be indemnified for any delays induced by provincial or municipal governments. In 2020, three insurance companies that had previously supported the project withdrew their support, including Zurich Insurance Group, the leading insurer. The company that is advancing the project said that it still had enough insurance coverage. By February 2020, the assessment for the completion of the project was estimated at $12.6 billion, an increase of the previous estimate of $7.4 billion. The cost increase was the result of rising costs of "labour, steel, and land". In a September 2020 interview with the Canadian Press, TMC's CEO Ian Anderson said that the expansion was on schedule despite the $5.2-billion increase in its cost. Anderson cited other challenges to construction including the COVID-19 pandemic, the slump in the demand for fuel, which contributes to the slump in the price of oil, and the protests by opponents to the expansion.

By February 2022, TMC said that costs had increased by 70%, from $12.6 billion to $21.4 billion. Faced with the federal government's costly COVID-19 response, Finance Minister Chrystia Freeland, said this new funding for the pipeline was not part of the federal government's commitment. The status of the company changed to a non-agent Crown corporation on April 29, 2022, which meant that it was able to access financing from third-party lenders. In March 2023, it was announced that the cost has again increased to $30.9 billion. As of April 2022, construction had reached the half-way mark. The company said in their November 2022 third-quarter report that expansion would be mechanically complete by the third quarter of 2023 and the commercial service would be operational in the fourth quarter of 2023.

According to a January 2023 statement from the company, more than 700 kilometres (430 mi) of pipe was already in place representing 75% of the entire project. On January 3, 2024, Trans Mountain Corp said in a 33-page filing that it planned to begin line fill in March or May, depending on the diameter of pipe to be used and assuming no new problems. The line fill represents the final step before the pipeline goes into service. According to the filing, the pipeline can enter service within one month of mechanical completion preceding line fill.

On May 1, 2024, the Trans Mountain pipeline expansion officially began operations after 12 years and C$34 billion in costs. The project nearly tripled oil pipeline capacity from Alberta to Canada's Pacific coast to 890,000 barrels per day (141,000 m^{3}/d).

=== Debate ===
The expansion project faced criticism, particularly from environmentalists and First Nations groups. To reach the terminus, tankers have to pass through a very narrow channel of shallow water from the open sea, still putting leaks at risk due to vehicle crashes. Environmentalists expressed concern about the heightened risk of an oil spill in the Burrard Inlet resulting from the expansion, which entailed the obstruction of 30% of the inlet and a seven-fold increase in tanker traffic, according to Stand.earth, formerly ForestEthics.

Those who supported the expansion said that it would create jobs and that it had a lower risk of spilling oil than transporting oil by rail, which pipeline proponents said would otherwise have to be used. A 2014 study by Simon Fraser University claimed that Kinder Morgan overestimated the economic benefits of the pipeline expansion. From 2008 through 2018, Western Canadian Select (WCS), Canada's benchmark for heavy crude oil sold at an average discount of US$17 against the benchmark for light oil, West Texas Intermediate (WTI). This widened to a record US$50 in the fall of 2018 with the price of WCS hitting a record low of less than US$14 a barrel.

Despite federal government approval, seven Federal Court challenges were filed by the municipalities of Vancouver and Burnaby, and the Tsleil-Waututh, Squamish, Kwantlen, and Coldwater First Nations. In November 2017, Minister of Natural Resources Jim Carr stated that the federal government had sent a letter in support of a dispute resolution process to the National Energy Board to expedite any future disputes over provincial or municipal permits impeding the expansion. BC Environmental Minister George Heyman accused the federal government of interfering with an independent review of the project, arguing that "it's both a highly unusual and a highly troubling intrusion on a province's right to enforce its own permits, its own regulations and the interests of its own citizens". On January 30, 2018, the B.C. government proposed a restriction on increases to the amount of diluted bitumen that could be imported into the province from Alberta, until the completion of studies on whether potential spillage could be mitigated. The province also announced an intent to consult with local communities and First Nations among others. Alberta premier Rachel Notley criticized the proposal as being a stalling tactic on Trans Mountain expansion, explaining that "the B.C. government has every right to consult on whatever it pleases with its citizens. It does not have the right to rewrite our constitution and assume powers for itself that it does not have." On February 6, 2018, Notley ordered the Alberta Gaming and Liquor Commission to cease future imports of British Columbia wine as a retaliatory sanction over these moves. The wine sanctions were lifted on February 22, 2018.

On April 8, 2018, Kinder Morgan suspended "non-essential" activities relating to the pipeline, as the company did not want to "put [its] shareholders at risk on the remaining project spend". The company stated that it would attempt to reach agreements on a funding plan with stakeholders by May 31. On April 16, the Alberta government introduced the Preserving Canada's Economic Prosperity Act, which would give the Minister of Energy power to regulate the export of crude oil, natural gas, or refined fuel from Alberta. The act could be used to effectively ban the export of Alberta gas to British Columbia. As such, B.C. Attorney General David Eby threatened to sue Alberta over the act, as he considered it unconstitutional, and stated that it could have a further impact on gasoline prices in the province.

On May 29, 2018, the federal government announced its intent to acquire the Trans Mountain Pipeline from Kinder Morgan for $4.5 billion. The government did not intend to remain the permanent owner of the pipeline, as it planned to seek outside investors to finance the twinning project. The government could not find a buyer before the consummation of the purchase, and it carried out the purchase via a crown corporation, and operated it in the meantime. Critics of the expansion argued that the purchase was a taxpayer-funded bailout of the project. B.C. Premier John Horgan stated that the sale would not affect the provincial government's ongoing efforts to block the pipeline expansion, stating that "rather than go to the court to determine jurisdictions, they're making financial decisions that affect taxpayers and they'll have to be accountable for that". Stewart Phillip, president of the Union of British Columbia Indian Chiefs, said that the union was "absolutely shocked and appalled that Canada is willingly investing taxpayers' money in such a highly controversial fossil fuel expansion project". On August 30, 2018, Kinder Morgan Canada's shareholders voted to approve the sale of the pipeline to the federal government. However, the same day, the Federal Court of Appeal overturned the government's approval of the expansion project, citing that it did not sufficiently fulfill its constitutional duties to consult local First Nations groups, and because it lacked an environmental assessment of increased tanker traffic on orcas in the Salish Sea off the BC coast. On August 31, Trudeau said the federal government remained committed to the pipeline expansion project in spite of this setback. In response to the approval being overturned, Premier Rachel Notley announced that Alberta would pull out of the national carbon price and called for an appeal to the Supreme Court of the Federal Court's August 30 decision.

=== Protests ===
The expansion project faced opposition from civic governments, First Nations, environmentally concerned citizens, and others. In September 2012, Tsleil-Waututh leaders had hoped to shut down the project altogether.

In November 2014, opponents of the pipeline expansion camped in Burnaby Mountain Park to block pipeline construction crews, and over 100 were arrested. Members of the Squamish and Tsleil-Waututh in British Columbia paddled canoes on Burrard Inlet, in North Vancouver, to Kinder Morgan's Burnaby Terminal for a ceremony to protest the expansion of the Trans Mountain pipeline. In a 2020 Global News interview, with the pipeline expansion work underway again, Grand Chief Stewart Phillip, president of the Union of BC Indian Chiefs, said that he expected that there would be more "Burnaby Mountain-style" protests.

Protests began in Vancouver to stop work on the pipeline on September 19, 2017.

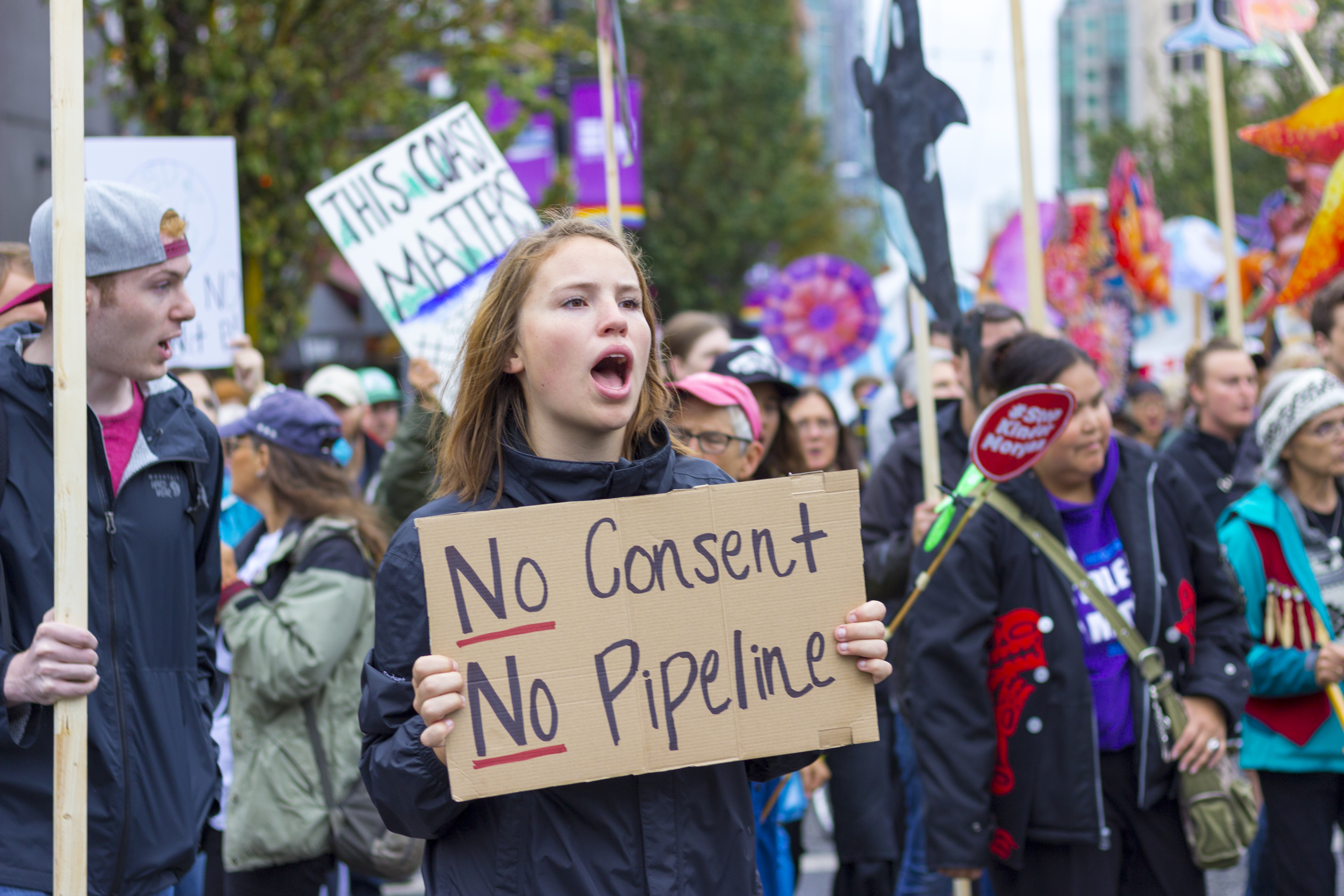
A protester at a Kinder Morgan Pipeline rally, September 2017

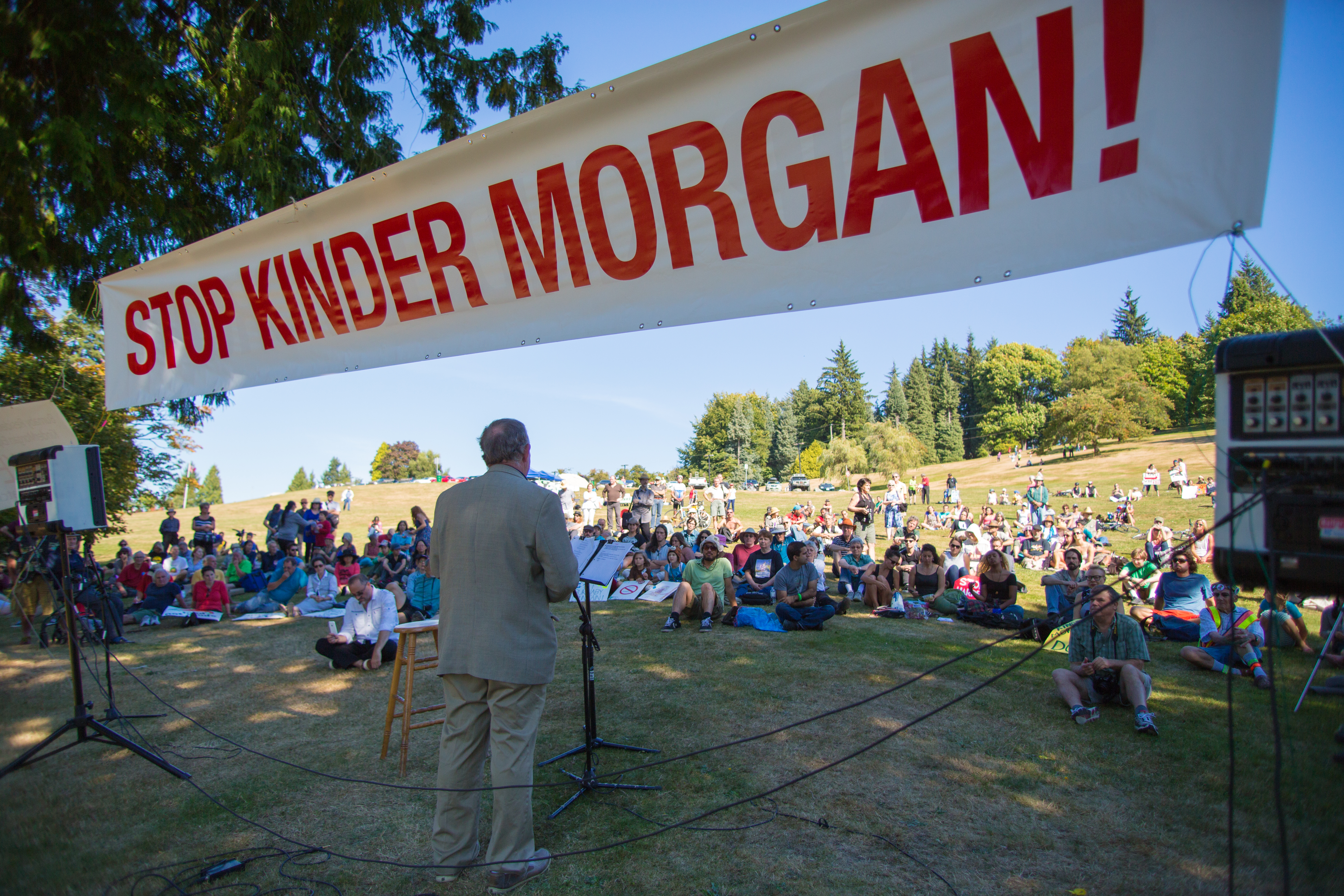
Burnaby Mayor Derek Corrigan addresses a protest at the Kinder Morgan Pipeline rally, September 2014

Burnaby Mayor Derek Corrigan addressed the crowd at a Stop Kinder Morgan protest rally in Burnaby Mountain Park. By 2018, rallies opposing the projects had been organized across Canada. Organizations including LeadNow and the Dogwood Initiative also opposed the project and organized protests.

The RCMP contained the protests on Burnaby Mountain. In July 2018 activists blocked an oil tanker from the Ironworkers' Memorial Bridge in Vancouver. In September 2021 a treetop camp in the Brunette River Conservation Area was dismantled by RCMP following a court injunction. The protest camp had been occupied by protesters since December 2020, and a leader of the protest claimed further actions would be planned.

==== Secwépemc opposition ====
According to Aboriginal Peoples Television Network, beginning in 2013 Secwépemc community members, primarily women, defended their traditional land (known as Secwepemcul’ecw) against the proposed expansion of the pipeline, asserting that the expansion was approved without sufficient consultation. The expansion crossed 518 km of Secwépemc territory. The land defenders (as they called themselves; some media refers to them as protesters and activists) were concerned about the damage to the land and water the pipeline passes through, in particular the disruption of salmon populations, violation of the Declaration on the Rights of Indigenous Peoples, and violation of traditional Secwépemc law, founded by the Okanagan Shuswap Confederacy. Their claim was that the First Nation band governments only had jurisdiction through Canadian law on their reserves, whereas traditional Secwépemc leadership retained sovereignty over Secwepemcul’ecw.

Beginning in July 2018, a Secwépemc protest camp was occupied just outside of Blue River, British Columbia, where the pipeline was to drill under the river. That camp, established by a group known as the Tiny House Warriors, was near a work camp. The establishment of the protest camp led Chief Rosanne Casimir of Tk’emlúps te Secwépemc First Nation (TteS), along with Chief Shelly Loring of Simpcw First Nation to issue a joint statement asking the Tiny House Warriors to stand down, claiming it was the Warriors violating Secwépemc law.

In early September 2020, protester Loralie Dick chained herself to the TMX worksite in Kamloops before being arrested by the RCMP for violating a B.C. Supreme Court injunction from 2018 that barred land defenders from blocking work.

In early October 2020, a protest camp was set up along the Thompson River, along the proposed route of the expansion. One of the protesters, Secwépemc matriarch Miranda Dick, said that there were an average of 20 people at the camp as of October 5. At the time it was set up, Chief Casimir said she had no issue with the protest camp, so long as health and safety guidelines were followed. On October 9, in response to TMX workers being seen surveying in preparation to drill under the river, the camp was moved directly in the way of the expansion. On October 10, the Secwépemc delivered a cease and desist notice to TMX for the second time. On October 11 it was moved again due to a chemical leak in the river. By October 15, the RCMP had begun arresting people connected to the camp.

=== Phase III consultations ===
In response to the Federal Court's overturning the federal authorization of Trans Mountain Expansion, the Canadian government "reinitiated Phase III consultations" with Natural Resources Canada as lead and Justice Frank Iacobucci appointed by the government to oversee consultations. An NEB panel heard three weeks of Indigenous traditional testimony with 117 Indigenous groups impacted by the pipeline, beginning on November 19, 2018, with sessions in Calgary, Victoria and Nanaimo.

The Trudeau government restricted the Phase III hearings in terms of time and scope. The government gave the NEB a "tight timeline" with a final report due on February 22, 2019. The hearings were also restricted by the NEB panel to investigate "new information" as it related to the impact of increased oil tanker traffic to and from the Westridge Marine Terminal in Burrard Inlet, Burnaby, to Canada's 12-nautical-mile territorial waters. The environmental concern in this area included the Salish Sea's southern resident killer whales' (SRKW) prime Chinook salmon feeding ground. By November 2018, there were only 74 SRKW left. Noise and pollution from marine vessels along with the diminishing stocks of salmon – their prime source of food – contributed to the whales' declining numbers.

Hearings in the form of pipeline roundtable meetings with Trans Mountain representative and indigenous groups were held in Calgary in November 2019 as well as in Kamloops and Nanaimo in December.

=== Government of Canada 2019 approval of TMX ===
On June 18, 2019, the federal government through the Governor in Council confirmed the approval of the federally-owned TMX project. The twinned pipeline will have the capacity to carry almost 1 million barrels per day (160,000 m^{3}/d) from Alberta to the coast of British Columbia. The National Energy Board, Prime Minister Justin Trudeau and his cabinet agreed that the TMX was in the "national interest" as it would add "tens of billions of dollars" to government revenue as well as sustaining thousands of jobs. Both the NEB and the federal government acknowledged that there was a possibility that TMX could "damage the environment and marine life", but the benefits outweighed the risks.

Trudeau said that the revenue from TMC, which was estimated at $500 million annually just in federal corporate taxes, would be invested in "unspecified clean energy projects". In a letter sent to both Trans Mountain and the lawyers representing the Tsleil-Waututh First Nation, the NEB wrote that within the context of "substantial" and "significant" interest and participation on the part of Indigenous peoples and the general public, including the August 30, 2018, decision in Tsleil-Waututh Nation v. Canada, the NEB's regulatory oversight processes for the next phases of the Trans Mountain Expansion Project "lifecycle", which include "detailed route approvals", such as potential "routing and non-routing", would include a public comment period.

=== SCC 2020 decisions dismissing appeals challenging TMX ===
By December 2019, the legal basis of the expansion was challenged in Canada's Federal Court of Appeal as politicians, environmentalists, and some Indigenous groups returned to the courts and pressed the issue of aboriginal title. Some Indigenous groups including the Kehewin Cree Nation, T'Sou-ke Nation, Frog Lake First Nation, Scia'new First Nation, Simpcw First Nation, Pellt'iq't First Nation, and Squiala First Nation formed the Western Indigenous Pipeline Group (WIPG) and have sanctioned the project for ownership stakes. Others, like the Coldwater Indian Band, have unsettled issues. The issues include disputes over the compensation from the institution of the first pipeline right-of-way in the 1950s, as well as future water supply risks which they would assume.

In February 2020, a Federal Court of Appeal denied the request by environment and Indigenous groups to "consider whether there had been sufficient consultation". On March 5, 2020, the Supreme Court of Canada "declined to hear" a set of five legal challenges to the project's approval. These originated from First Nations groups, environmental organization, and teenage activists.

On July 2, 2020, the Supreme Court rejected appeals by the Squamish Nation, Tsleil-Waututh First Nation, and Coldwater Indian Band and others challenging federal approval of the Trans Mountain pipeline expansion project, "bringing an end to the years-long legal challenge".

== See also ==
- Eagle Spirit Pipeline
- Northern Gateway Pipeline
