= Canadian Environmental Assessment Act, 2012 =

Act of Parliament of Canada regulating environmental assessment

Parliament of Canada
- Citation: S.C. 2012 c. 19

Amends
- Canadian Environmental Assessment Act, 1992

Repealed by
- Impact Assessment Act, 2019
- Status: Repealed

The Canadian Environmental Assessment Act, 2012 (French: Loi canadienne sur l’évaluation environnementale (2012), CEAA 2012) and its regulations established the legislative basis for the federal practice of environmental assessment in most regions of Canada from 2012 to 2019. It was repealed with the coming into force of the Impact Assessment Act on August 28, 2019.

== History ==
The Canadian Environmental Assessment Act, S.C. 1992, c. 37 (CEAA) is an Act of Parliament that was passed by the Government of Canada in 1992. The Act requires federal departments, including Environment Canada, agencies, and Crown corporations to conduct environmental assessments for proposed projects where the federal government is the proponent or where the project involves federal funding, permits, or licensing. The purposes of the Act were set out as follows: (1) to achieve sustainable development that conserves environmental quality by integrating environmental factors into planning and decision-making process, (2) exercise leadership within Canada and internationally, and (3) to provide access to information and to facilitating public participation.

The original version of the Act was repealed in 2012 and re-written by the Harper government. The new law came into effect on July 6, 2012.

There are marked differences between the new act, the Environmental Assessment Act, 2012 (sc2012 c-19) and the previous act, the Environmental Assessment Act (sc 1992 c-37). The new Act omits the preamble and statement of purpose. Section 4 of each Act is a clause that lists purposes. The new Act is more restrictive in purpose. It applies to "designated projects" instead of "projects". Public participation is "during" an environmental assessment instead of "throughout". The new Act also adds as a purpose that assessment be completed in a timely manner. The Regulations Designating Physical Activities document (RDPA) describes the projects covered by the new Act. The new Act limits assessment just to the type of projects listed in this regulation (and its amendments).

The previous Act applied to all projects that altered the environment. The Inclusion List Regulations (SOR/94-637) described projects for which a screening report was always required. The Inclusion List regulation was twice the size of the current list of designated physical activities. The previous Act also required a screening report for any project for which a federal department was required to issue a license or permit under the specific sections of other acts listed in the Federal Authorities Regulation (SOR/96-280). The previous Act also required a modified screening report for projects where the proponent was a Crown Corporation or for projects outside of Canada or where the Government of Canada funded the project.

Under the previous Act, other federal departments were not allowed to issue licenses and permits until any required environmental assessment was complete. Under the new Act, certain other departments, specifically the National Energy Board, may issue licenses and permits without an environmental assessment, may conduct their own assessment, and may cancel existing assessments currently in process.

The Prescribed Information for the Description of a Designated Project Regulations (SOR/2012-148) gives the information required under the new Act. A lawyer with no knowledge of biology could supply the information. Only section 17(a) question, the requirement to describe changes the project may cause to fish habitat requires knowledge of ecology. Information on environmental effects is limited to effects on fish, aquatic species, and migratory birds.

The regulations under the previous Act required essentially the same information in the basic project description, except that it also required information on terrain, air, vegetation, all wildlife, and all habitats.

Central to the previous Act was a comprehensive study. What was to be included in the study was determined for each project. The agency issued a project-specific comprehensive study guideline within 90 days of receipt of the project application. The comprehensive study specified baseline data that needed to be collected, identified specific groups that needed to be consulted, and identified specific concerns for the proponent to address. The new act does not require a comprehensive study.

The new Act decreases initial input from biologists and accelerates the movement of the project to the legal hearing stage. Upon receipt of the project description, the agency has ten days to request additional information and post the project description on the internet. Following 20 days in which the public may post comments, the agency has 25 days to decide if the project requires a formal environmental assessment. Different bodies may conduct the assessment, but all assessments now follow judicial procedures of argument and counter-argument.

The previous Act used a "biologist to biologist" approach. The agency had 90 days to determine if a project required a comprehensive study and to prepare project-specific impact assessment guidelines for the comprehensive study. Following completion of the comprehensive study, the agency could determine that no further review was necessary. If further review was necessary, the project could be sent to mediation or to a formal review panel.

The new Act limits public input. The general public is allowed to comment on a new project during the 20 days the project is open for comment on the internet. During the formal review, only those who are "directly affected" by the project may participate. The legal meaning of "directly affected" in this context refers generally to persons who own property within one kilometer of the project.

Under the previous Act, the project description was posted on the internet immediately, but the main source of public input was the consultation process described in the project-specific guidelines for any project that required a comprehensive study. The general rule was to actively inform the public and to solicit concerns. This included information sessions where the proponent would make a presentation and then solicit comments. The guidelines would list the municipal governments and tribal councils that must be consulted. For projects that went to formal review, the participation was open to all parties with an interest that was "neither frivolous nor vexatious"

Both the old and new Act require an assessment report within 12 months. However, the new Act also requires the Minister to make a decision within 24 months if the Minister has referred the matter to a review panel. Although the new law allows some extensions, the effect of a review panel failing to hear all testimony within the required time is that the Minister must reject the project application. Approval of the application in the face of an incomplete review is not a legal option for the Minister. The legal principles that apply in Canada are similar to the principles that required U.S. President Obama to reject the application for the Keystone Pipeline when forced to make a decision by Congress

In 2016, the government of Justin Trudeau held a discussion about the CEAA and the RDPA. They then proposed the Impact Assessment Act.

== Purpose ==
The purpose of CEAA 2012 is to:

- Protect components of the environment that are within federal legislative authority from significant adverse environmental effects caused by a designated project;
- Ensure that designated projects are considered and carried out in a careful and precautionary manner in order to avoid significant adverse environmental effects when a federal authority is exercising a power or performing a duty or function required for the project to proceed;
- Promote cooperation and coordination between federal and provincial governments;
- Promote communication and cooperation with Aboriginal peoples;
- Ensure that opportunities are provided for meaningful public participation;
- Ensure that environmental assessments are completed in a timely manner;
- Ensure that proposed projects on federal lands or that are outside Canada and carried out or financially supported by a federal authority, are considered in a careful and precautionary manner in order to avoid significant adverse environmental effects;
- Encourage federal authorities to take actions in a manner that promotes sustainable development in order to achieve or maintain a healthy environment and a healthy economy; and
- Encourage further studies of the cumulative effects of physical activities in a region and the consideration of the study results in environmental assessments.

== Application ==
CEAA 2012 applies to projects described in the RDPA, namely physical activities summarized therein.

When the Canadian Environmental Assessment Agency (the Agency) is the responsible authority for a designated project that is described in the RDPA, upon acceptance of a project description, an analysis is undertaken by the Agency to decide if a federal environmental assessment is required. This step does not apply to designated projects regulated by the National Energy Board and the Canadian Nuclear Safety Commission for which conducting an environmental assessment is mandatory when such a project is designated.

The Minister of the Environment may designate a project when carrying out of the project may cause adverse environmental effects, or that public concerns related to those effects warrant the designation. An environmental assessment under CEAA 2012 is required for each project designated by the Minister of the Environment.

== Administration ==
=== Responsible authority ===
A responsible authority ensures that an environmental assessment of a designated project is conducted in accordance with CEAA 2012, including ensuring the public is provided with an opportunity to participate in the environmental assessment.

Under CEAA 2012, responsible authorities can be the Canadian Nuclear Safety Commission, the National Energy Board or the Agency.

=== Other federal authorities ===
Federal departments and agencies with specific expertise are required to provide information and advice that support the conduct of environmental assessments by responsible authorities.

For projects on federal lands that are not designated projects, before a federal authority or an airport authority may carry out the project or exercise any power or perform any duty or function that will permit the project to be carried out, the authority will have to be satisfied that carrying out the project is not likely to cause significant adverse environmental effects. This also applies if the Governor in Council has decided the project's significant adverse environmental effects are justified in the circumstances. This responsibility also applies to projects outside of Canada that are federally funded or for which the Government of Canada is the proponent.

== Types of environmental assessments ==
There are two types of environmental assessment conducted under the Canadian Environmental Assessment Act, 2012 (CEAA 2012):

1. environmental assessment by a responsible authority,
2. and environmental assessment by a review panel.

An environmental assessment by a responsible authority is conducted by the Agency, the National Energy Board or the Canadian Nuclear Safety Commission. Information on the process for environmental assessments conducted by the Agency is provided below. Information with respect to environmental assessments conducted by the National Energy Board or Canadian Nuclear Safety Commission may be found on their websites.

An environmental assessment by review panel is conducted by a panel of individuals appointed by the Minister of the Environment and supported by the Agency.

Both types of assessments can be conducted by the federal government alone or in cooperation with another jurisdiction, such as a province.

== Timelines ==
Upon acceptance of a complete project description, the Agency has 45 calendar days, including a 20-day public comment period, to determine whether a federal environmental assessment is required.

An environmental assessment conducted by the Agency must be completed within 365 days. This timeline starts when a notice of the commencement of the environmental assessment is posted on the Registry Internet site and ends when the Minister of the Environment makes a decision as to whether the designated project is likely to cause significant adverse environmental effects.

The Minister of the Environment may refer a project to a review panel within 60 days of the notice of commencement of an environmental assessment. An environmental assessment by a review panel needs to be completed within 24 months. This timeline starts when the proposed project is referred to a review panel and ends when the Minister of the Environment issues the environmental assessment decision statement.

=== Extensions ===
For every environmental assessment:

- The Minister may extend the time limits by an additional three months, to facilitate cooperation with another jurisdiction or to take into account other circumstances specific to the project.
- Upon recommendation of the Minister of the Environment, the Governor in Council may also extend the time limit (in addition to the three-month extension granted by the Minister).
- The period that is taken by the proponent to respond to a request from the Agency or a review panel (conduct studies, prepare environmental impact statement, collect further information, etc.), is not counted in the timelines.

== RDPA, and amendments ==
- SOR/2012-147
- SOR/2013-186 Canada Gazette Part II - Vol. 147, No. 23 — November 6, 2013: Regulations Amending the Regulations Designating Physical Activities

== See also ==
- 2012 in the environment
