= C69 =

C69 or C-69 may refer to:

- Bill C-69, a 2019 act of the Parliament of Canada
- Caldwell 69, a planetary nebula
- Eye neoplasm
- HMS London (C69), a County-class heavy cruisers of the Royal Navy
- Lockheed C-69 Constellation, an American transport aircraft
- London Underground C69 and C77 Stock, rolling stock used from 1970 to 2014
- Ruy Lopez, Exchange Variation, a chess opening
