= Impact Assessment Agency of Canada =

- Agence d'évaluation d'impact du Canada

Agency overview
- Formed: 1994
- Jurisdiction: Government of Canada
- Headquarters: Ottawa, Ontario
- Employees: 508 (2023–2024)
- Annual budget: $97.5 million (2023–2024)
- Minister responsible: Julie Dabrusin, Minister of the Environment, Climate Change and Nature
- Agency executive: Terence Hubbard, President
- Parent department: Environment and Climate Change Canada
- Website: www.canada.ca/en/impact-assessment-agency

The Impact Assessment Agency of Canada (IAAC; French: Agence d'évaluation d'impact du Canada; AEIC) is an agency of the Government of Canada responsible for federal environmental assessment process of major projects.

The agency assesses the environmental and socio-economic impacts of major projects in accordance with the Impact Assessment Act, 2019 and the Canadian Environmental Assessment Act, 2012. The agency oversees most federal environmental assessment processes, except for projects regulated by the Canadian Nuclear Safety Commission or the Canada Energy Regulator (CER). The agency encourages public participation, provides administrative and advisory support for review panels, promotes sustainable development, and acts as the Crown Consultation Coordinator to integrate the federal government's Indigenous consultation activities. It is part of the Environment and Climate Change Canada portfolio and reports to the minister of environment and climate change.

== History ==
The agency was established in 1994 prior to the adoption of the Canadian Environmental Assessment Act in 1995 by the Parliament of Canada. The legislation is the legal basis for the federal environmental assessment process in Canada.

On April 26, 2012, the Government introduced Bill C-38, the Jobs, Growth and Long-Term Prosperity Act, which repealed the existing Canadian Environmental Assessment Act and replaced it with a new Canadian Environmental Assessment Act, 2012. Bill C-38 received Royal Assent on 29 June 2012 and came into force on 6 July 2012.

The Impact Assessment Agency of Canada was previously known as the Canadian Environmental Assessment Agency (French: Agence canadienne d’évaluation environnementale). The change in name came into force on August 28, 2019, along with other consequential legislative amendments under an omnibus bill titled An Act to enact the Impact Assessment Act and the Canadian Energy Regulator Act, to amend the Navigation Protection Act and to make consequential amendments to other Acts, which received royal assent on June 21, 2019.

== Projects ==
Impact assessments conducted by the agency are subject to a five-stage process:

=== Planning Phase ===
A project proponent submits an initial description of the project (Initial Project Description) to the agency. The Agency then shares this information with the public and Indigenous peoples, who are invited to provide information and contribute to planning the assessment.

=== Impact Statement Phase ===
The agency provides the project proponent with information requirements which the proponent must fulfill prior to moving to the next assessment phase. The proponent's response makes up a "[d]etailed technical document prepared by the Proponent" responding to the agency's information requirements.

=== Impact Assessment Phase ===
The agency analyzes the proponent's response for completeness, including consultation with the public, Indigenous Peoples and other federal departments "that may be in possession of specialist or expert information or knowledge." The agency then develops an Impact Assessment Report which considers "the information and analysis by the proponent and associated perspectives including of expert federal departments, Indigenous groups, the public and provincial, territorial, or Indigenous jurisdictions." This report is shared with decision-makers to inform their decision to approve or reject the project.

=== Decision-Making Phase ===
The agency's work informs the Minister or Governor in Council's decision on whether a project's adverse impacts are in the public interest. Decision statements set out the rationale for the decision.

=== Post-Decision Phase ===
If a project is approved, the agency must verify compliance with the decision statement and correct any incidents of non-compliance.

== Policy and guidance ==
=== Cumulative Effects ===
The CEAA defines Cumulative Effects Assessment as "[a]n assessment of the incremental effects of an action on the environment when the effects are combined with those from other past, existing and future actions." "Cumulative effects are changes to the environment that are caused by an action in combination with other past, present and future human actions."

In 1994, the CEAA published A Reference Guide for the Canadian Environmental Assessment Act: Addressing Cumulative Environmental Effects.
