= Canaport =

Coordinates: 45.211271°N 65.985952°W

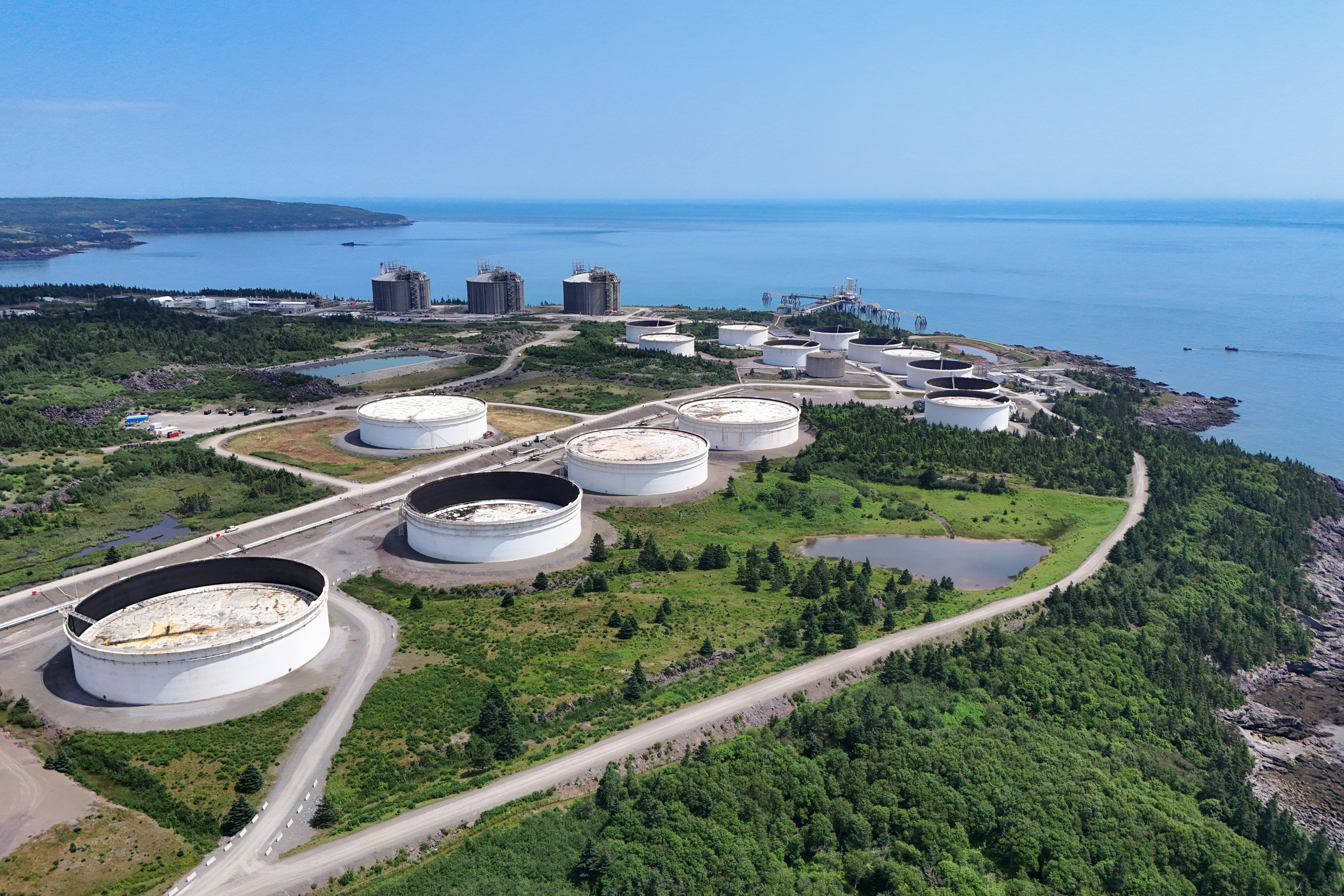
- Aerial view, 2025
- Interactive map of Canaport

Location
- Country: Canada
- Location: Saint John, New Brunswick

Details
- Opened: 1970 (crude oil terminal), 2008 (LNG terminal)
- Owned by: Irving Oil
- Type of Harbor: deep-water crude oil receiving terminal liquified natural gas terminal
- No. of berths: 1 single point mooring system for crude oil supertankers 1 jetty for LNG tankers

Statistics
- Website; Canaport (crude oil) http://irvingoil.com/operations_and_partners/operations/supply/ Canaport LNG http://www.canaportlng.com

Canaport is a Canadian marine crude oil receiving terminal located on the north shore of the Bay of Fundy at Mispec Point, approximately 9 km (5.6 mi) southeast of the city of Saint John, New Brunswick.

Commissioned in 1970, Canaport was the first deep-water crude terminal in the Western Hemisphere able to receive supertankers. Canaport was built by Irving Oil, which has continuously owned and operated the facility throughout its existence. The terminal is currently configured exclusively as a crude receiving terminal in order to supply the Irving Oil Refinery, which was itself constructed in 1960.

== Crude terminal infrastructure ==
Canaport consists of the following infrastructure:

- A floating single point mooring system located approximately 0.63 nmi (1.17 km) southwest of Mispec Point to which tankers attach onto and swing freely 360° with the tide.
- An undersea pipeline (0.63 nmi (1.17 km) in length) that transfers crude oil from the single point mooring system to the shore.
- Tanks on shore with over 6,000,000 bbl (950,000,000 L) of storage capacity.
- A land pipeline (8 km (5.0 mi) in length) that transfers crude oil from the storage tanks to the refinery in the east end of Saint John.

The terminal was originally designed to have 5 storage tanks measuring 200 ft (61 m) in diameter. The owner of Irving Oil, K.C. Irving modified the terminal's design to include 6 tanks so each tank could each have a single letter that when combined would spell I-R-V-I-N-G when viewed from the water. Subsequent expansions of the refinery in the 1970s, 80s and 90s resulted in the construction of additional storage tanks.

== Canaport LNG ==
Canaport LNG

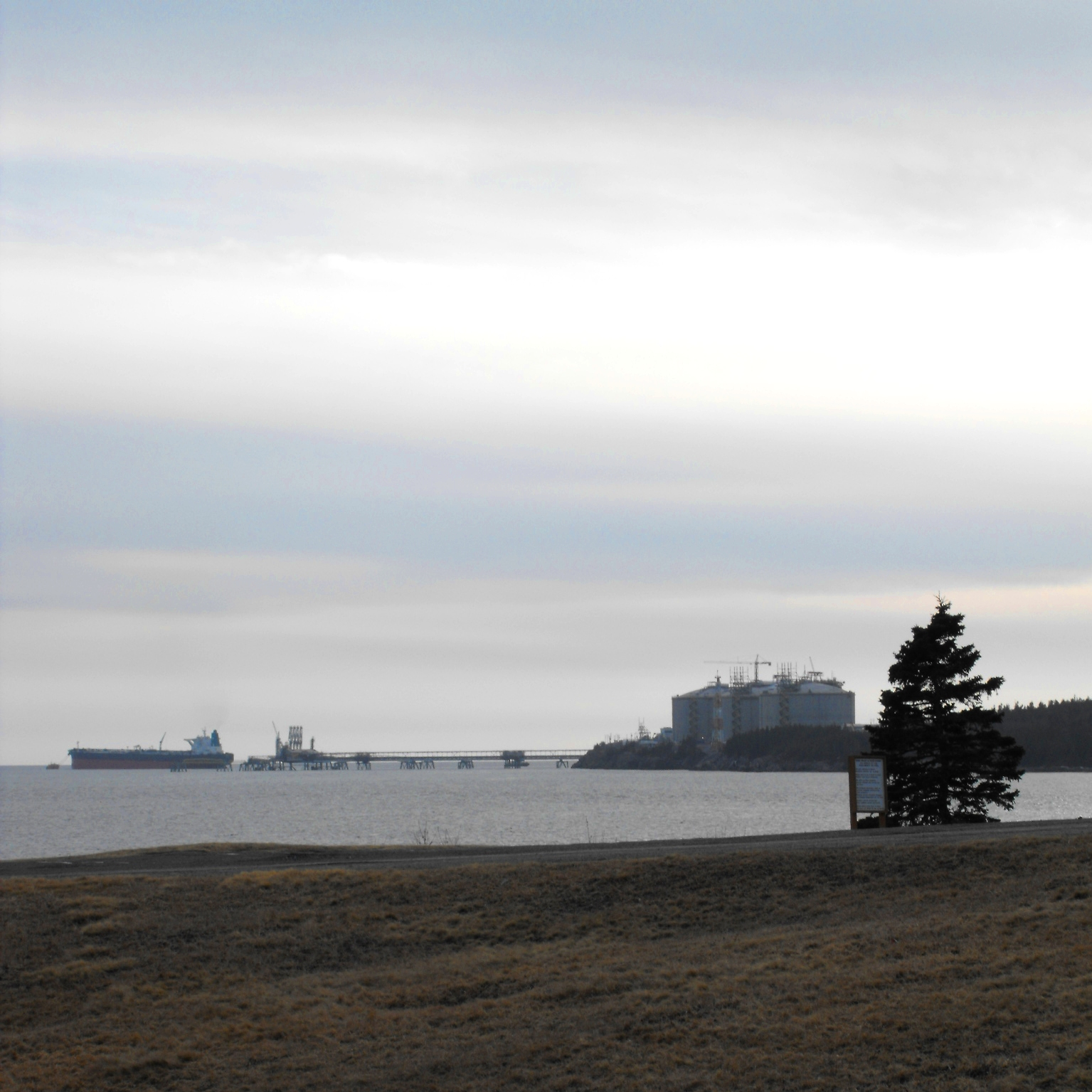
The Canaport facility viewed from the east. The LNG terminal jetty and LNG storage tanks are on the right. A supertanker carrying oil for the crude terminal is attached to the Single buoy mooring system on the left.

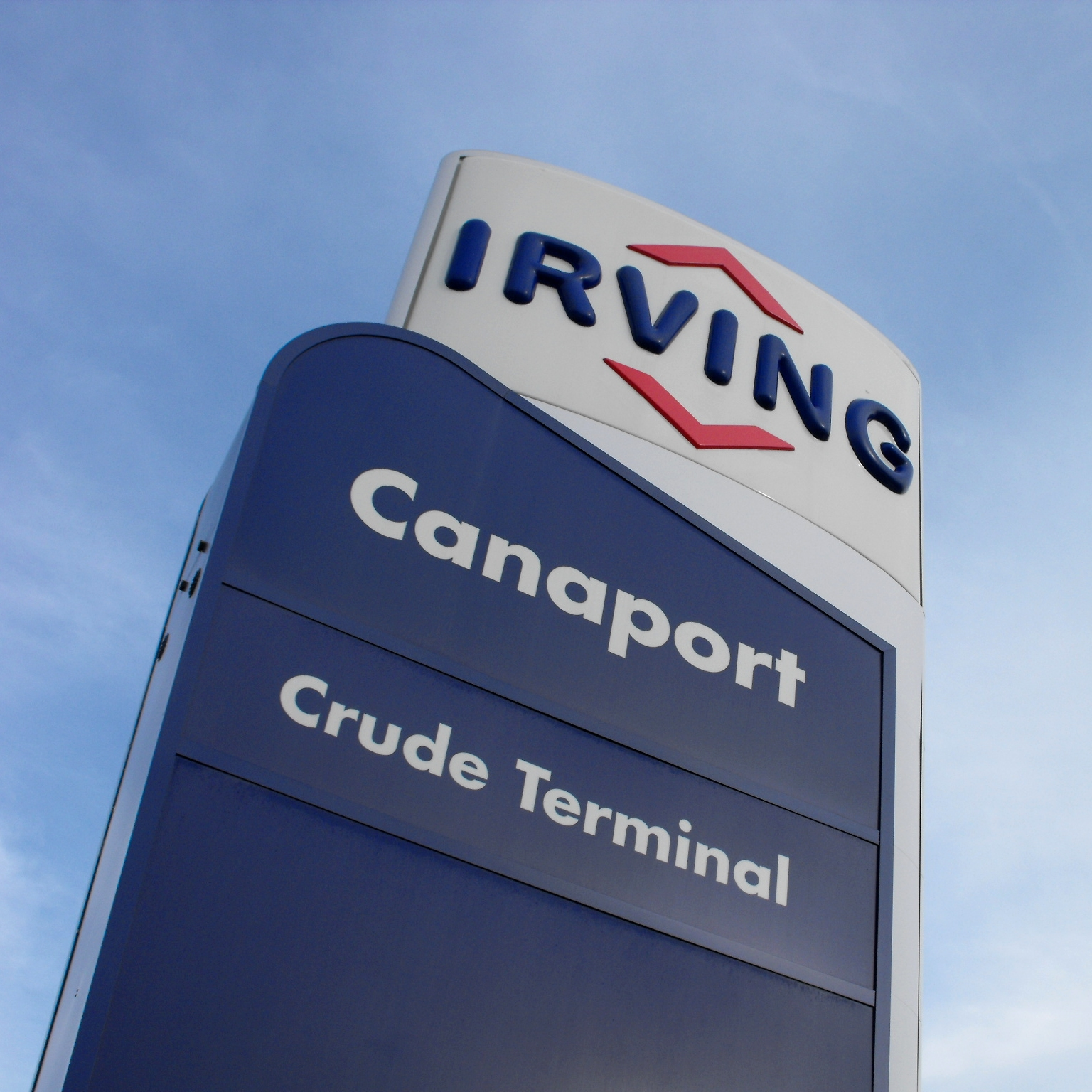
Canaport entrance sign

The Canaport LNG terminal is a liquified natural gas (LNG) receiving and regasification terminal located adjacent and immediately east of the Canaport crude receiving terminal. Commissioned in 2008, it is Canada's first LNG terminal and the first LNG terminal built in eastern North America in 30 years. It is capable of receiving the largest LNG tankers in the world.

Canaport LNG has a nominal capacity of handling 1,200,000,000 cu ft (34,000,000 m^{3}) of LNG per day, enough to heat 5 million homes. Regasified LNG from the Canaport LNG terminal is capable of supplying 20% of the natural gas demand in the northeastern United States and Canada.

In 2001 Irving Oil applied for a permit to add liquified natural gas (LNG) to its Canaport deep-water crude receiving terminal. The permit was granted in April 2004 and Irving Oil entered into a partnership with Repsol to develop Canaport LNG; Irving Oil owns 25% of Canaport LNG while Repsol owns 75%. Construction of the LNG terminal started in September 2005 and the facility was commissioned in 2008 and received its first shipment of LNG in June 2009. Repsol acquired Irving's share in the LNG terminal in August 2021.

Canaport LNG consists of the following infrastructure:

- A pier, consisting of a terminal jetty constructed from 16 marine support jackets, 12 roadway and pipe support trestle sections, an LNG receiving platform, 10 mooring hooks, four berthing fenders, an access gangway and eight catwalk structures. Total structural steel weight is 7,500 t (8,300 short tons). Approximately 2,000 m^{3} (71,000 cu ft) of concrete form the road and platform deck.
- Three (3) insulated storage tanks on shore.
- A regasification facility using submerged combustion vaporizers to convert LNG into natural gas by warming it.

The construction of the Canaport LNG was coincident with construction of the Brunswick Pipeline which transports the natural gas from Canaport LNG to markets.

== Saint John LNG ==
In 2021, Canaport LNG was renamed to Saint John LNG following the purchase of the Irving interest by the Repsol partner. Saint John LNG is now fully owned by Repsol subsidiaries.

== Controversies ==
In 2005, Irving Oil received a controversial tax break from the City of Saint John to develop the Canaport LNG terminal; it was apparently negotiated one-on-one with the city's then-mayor Norm McFarlane. The tax concessions have cost the City of Saint John approximately $75 million over ten years, with a potential total loss of over $180 million. Saint John Common Council's reconsideration of this tax concession in 2015 resulted in warnings from Irving Oil, including editorials published in the Telegraph-Journal arguing against re-opening the deal.

In September 2013, nearly 7,500 songbirds were killed when they flew into a gas flare at the plant. The incident was caused by a "combination of nocturnal flaring and unsettled [foggy] weather conditions during peak migration periods [which] created the potential for a significant bird mortality event." The owners were eventually fined $750,000 for the offence. Soon after the incident, the plant completed a $45 million upgrade which significantly reduced the amount of flaring which takes place at the plant.

== Proposed new oil export terminal ==
In 2013, Irving Oil announced plans to build a new $300-million terminal at Canaport to export the oil from the proposed Energy East pipeline. It has not been constructed.
