= Oil Tanker Moratorium Act =

Canadian law regulating oil tankers

Parliament of Canada
- Long title: An Act respecting the regulation of vessels that transport crude oil or persistent oil to or from ports or marine installations located along British Columbia’s north coast
- Citation: Oil Tanker Moratorium Act, S.C. 2019, c. 26
- Passed by: House of Commons of Canada
- Passed: May 8, 2018
- Passed by: Senate of Canada
- Passed: June 13, 2019
- Royal assent: June 21, 2019
- Commenced: June 21, 2019 (Note: The Act is silent as to its commencement date. The default rule for Canadian Acts of Parliament is that when an Act is silent it comes into force on the day it received Royal Assent.)

Legislative history

First chamber: House of Commons of Canada
- Bill title: C-48
- Introduced by: Marc Garneau
- First reading: May 12, 2017
- Second reading: October 4, 2017
- Third reading: May 8, 2018
- Committee report: November 29, 2017

Second chamber: Senate of Canada
- Bill title: C-48
- Member(s) in charge: Mobina Jaffer
- First reading: May 9, 2018
- Second reading: December 11, 2018
- Third reading: June 13, 2019
- Committee report: June 3, 2019

Related legislation
- Impact Assessment Act and Canadian Energy Regulator Act (Bill C-69)
- Status: In force

The Oil Tanker Moratorium Act (French: Loi sur le moratoire relatif aux pétroliers), sometimes referred to as the West Coast Oil Tanker Moratorium Act, introduced and commonly referred to as Bill C-48, is an act of the Parliament of Canada and was passed by the 42nd Canadian Parliament in 2019. The Act was introduced as Bill C-48.

== Provisions ==
The act bans oil tankers carrying "more than 12,500 tons of crude oil or persistent oil" as cargo from stopping off the coast of British Columbia's north coast, from the northern tip of Vancouver Island to the border with Alaska.

The act led to the cancellation of the Eagle Spirit Pipeline.

The act also establishes an "administration and enforcement regime" which includes requirements to provide information and to follow directions and that provides for fines up to CA$5,000,000.

== Further developments ==
In the 2025 federal election, the Conservative Party pledged to repeal the act.
