= Impact Assessment Act and Canadian Energy Regulator Act =

Law regulating energy projects in Canada

Parliament of Canada
- Long title: An Act to enact the Impact Assessment Act and the Canadian Energy Regulator Act, to amend the Navigation Protection Act and to make consequential amendments to other Acts
- Citation: Impact Assessment Act and Canadian Energy Regulator Act, S.C. 2019, c. 28
- Passed by: House of Commons of Canada
- Passed: June 20, 2018
- Passed by: Senate of Canada
- Passed: June 6, 2019
- Royal assent: June 21, 2019

Legislative history

Initiating chamber: House of Commons of Canada
- Bill citation: Bill C-69
- Introduced by: Catherine McKenna MP, Minister of Environment and Climate Change
- First reading: February 8, 2018
- Second reading: March 19, 2018
- Third reading: May 8, 2018
- Committee report: May 29, 2018

Revising chamber: Senate of Canada
- Bill title: C-69
- Member(s) in charge: Government Liaison in the Senate Grant Mitchell
- First reading: June 20, 2018
- Second reading: December 12, 2018
- Third reading: June 13, 2019
- Committee report: May 28, 2019

Repeals
- Canadian Environmental Assessment Act, 2012; National Energy Board Act

Amended by
- Canada–United States–Mexico Agreement Implementation Act

Related legislation
- Oil Tanker Moratorium Act
- Status: Amended

The Impact Assessment Act and Canadian Energy Regulator Act (French: Loi sur l’évaluation d’impact and Loi sur la Régie canadienne de l’énergie), also referred to as Bill C-69, are two acts of the Parliament of Canada passed together by the 42nd Canadian Parliament in 2019. The Acts gave authority to the federal government to consider how climate change might be impacted by proposed natural resource projects when undergoing federal approvals, while also being attentive to safeguarding market competitiveness.

The act was held to be unconstitutional by the Alberta Court of Appeal in 2022 and by the Supreme Court of Canada in 2023. In 2024 Parliament amended the act to respond to the court decisions. In 2026 the Alberta court of Appeal held that the act is still unconstitutional.

== History ==
The bill, which was introduced by the Minister of Environment and Climate Change Catherine McKenna, had its first reading on February 8, 2018, its second reading on March 19, and its third reading on May 8. It passed in the House of Commons of Canada on June 20, 2018 and in the Senate of Canada on June 6, 2019. Bill C-69 received royal assent on June 21, 2019. The Acts were introduced together as Bill C-69 and entitled An Act to enact the Impact Assessment Act and the Canadian Energy Regulator Act, to amend the Navigation Protection Act and to make consequential amendments to other Acts.

== Repeals ==
C-69 repealed the Canadian Environmental Assessment Act, 2012 and the National Energy Board Act.

== Reception ==
C-69 was heavily criticized by Conservatives and the Canadian Association of Petroleum Producers, who feared that the new regulations would stifle investments to natural resources extraction in Canada. A June 20, 2019 National Post article called Bills C-69 and C-48 "controversial". The Post said that natural resources sector and some provinces had fiercely opposed the bills for over a year before its passage. Some critics of the bill say that it attacked the oil and gas sector in Canada, according to the Post. Alberta Premier Jason Kenney dubbed C-69 the "No more pipelines act".

Professors Martin Olszynski and Mark S. Winfield believe these criticisms are overblown. Winfred points out that the pre-2019 regulatory framework is much weaker than the one that existed for 40 years in Canada before it was axed in 2012. C-69 brought back some of the consultation requirements from that period, and according to Winfield, "the legislation is a relatively minor adjustment to what already existed". In fact, Olszynski believes that this bill would make it easier for projects to go forward, as project critics would be included in the decision-making process, and thus less likely to resort to litigation to make their voices heard.

The passage of Bill C-69 was widely viewed by industry as a negative.

== Amendments ==
The Canadian Energy Regulator Act was amended by the Canada–United States–Mexico Agreement Implementation Act, which was ratified on April 3, 2020, to replace references within the act to the North American Free Trade Agreement with references to the newer United States–Mexico–Canada Agreement.

== Legal challenges ==
The government of Alberta submitted a reference case to the Alberta Court of Appeal in 2021 alleging that Bill C-69 was an attack on the province's "vital economic interests" and that it has resulted in job loss. The reference asked if the bill was federal overreach into provincial jurisdiction and had a negative effect on future major oil and gas projects. On May 10, 2022, the Court of Appeal of Alberta (ABCA) found the Impact Assessment Act was unconstitutional.

On October 13, 2023, the Supreme Court of Canada upheld the ABCA's decision in Reference re Impact Assessment Act and ruled "the federal impact assessment scheme is unconstitutional in part." The Court found the Impact Assessment Act was "not directed at regulating 'effects within federal jurisdiction' as defined in the Act, because these effects do not drive the scheme’s decision-making functions" and that "the defined term “effects within federal jurisdiction” does not align with federal legislative jurisdiction." However, sections 81 to 91 of the Act, "which establishe[d] an impact assessment process for projects carried out or financed by federal authorities on federal lands or outside Canada," were found to be constitutional.

The response of the federal government to the Supreme Court's decision was seen in the 2024 Budget Implementation Act. Amendments to the IAA were necessary to bring legislation into compliance. These received royal assent and came into force on 20 June 2024.

The government of Alberta stated that the amendments were not sufficient to make the IAA constitutional and submitted a second reference case to the Alberta Court of Appeal. On October 9, 2026, the Court of Appeal held that the act was still unconstitutional.

== See also ==
- Oil Tanker Moratorium Act (Bill C-48)
