= Energy East =

Cancelled Canadian pipeline project

Energy East (cancelled)
- Proposed Energy East Pipeline Route

Location
- Country: Canada
- Province: Alberta, New Brunswick

General information
- Type: Diluted bitumen
- Status: cancelled October 5, 2017
- Owner: TC Energy

The Energy East pipeline was a proposed oil pipeline in Canada. It would have delivered diluted bitumen from Western Canada and North Western United States to Eastern Canada, from receipt points in Alberta, Saskatchewan and North Dakota to refineries and port terminals in New Brunswick and possibly Quebec. The TC PipeLines project would have converted about 3,000 kilometres (1,900 mi) of natural gas pipeline, which currently carries natural gas from Alberta to the Ontario-Quebec border, to diluted bitumen transportation. New pipeline, pump stations, and tank facilities also would have been constructed. The CA$12 billion pipeline would have been the longest in North America when complete.

The project was announced publicly on August 1, 2013, while the Keystone XL pipeline proposal was being debated. In October 2014, TransCanada Pipelines filed its formal project application with the National Energy Board. At the same time a number of groups announced their intention to oppose the pipeline. The project was cancelled on October 5, 2017 by TransCanada.

== Project description ==
The entire length would have been 4,600 kilometres (2,900 mi), with approximately 70 percent (3,000 kilometres; 1,900 mi) being existing pipeline that would have been converted from carrying natural gas to carrying diluted bitumen. The pipeline route would have run from Alberta to New Brunswick, crossing through Saskatchewan, Manitoba, Ontario, and Quebec. The original project proposal included a marine oil export terminal in Cacouna, Quebec, but that configuration was abandoned due to the impact it would have on a beluga whale habitat. The project would have had a capacity of 1.1 million barrels (~200,000 tonnes) of crude oil per day.

Irving Oil had announced plans to build a new $300-million terminal at its Canaport facility in Saint John to export the oil delivered from the pipeline.

== Background ==
In a November 10, 2011 phone call, then-President Barack Obama told then Prime Minister Stephen Harper that the Keystone XL approval process was on hold. In response, Frank McKenna, who was then Canadian Ambassador to the U.S., wrote a Financial Post opinion piece suggesting a west-east pipeline. In June 2013, Irving Oil's Arthur Irving and Frank McKenna discuss the TransCanada negotiations which have frustrated Irving and Irving and TransCanada finally reach a deal. The July 6, 2013 the fire and explosion with a 1-kilometre (0.6 mi) blast radius in the Lac-Mégantic rail disaster, the deadliest rail accident since Canada's confederation in 1867, took place. It was caused by the derailment of a freight train carrying Bakken Formation crude oil. Forty-two people died. About half of Lac-Mégantic, Quebec downtown area was destroyed immediately and almost all the remaining downtown buildings had to be demolished because of petroleum contamination.

There were a number of factors that contributed to TransCanada's October 5, 2017 decision to cancel the Energy East project, including "politics, the energy market and the economics of the energy industry." During the time between the announcement of the project (Aug 1st, 2013) and the cancellation (Oct 5th 2017) the price of oil had fallen from $106.57 USD/barrel to $39.40 USD/barrel.

In 2015, National Energy Board members—NEB's chief executive, Peter Watson, Lyne Mercier, Jacques Gauthier and Roland George "derailed" the Board's public hearings and were "forced to recuse themselves from further dealings with Energy East". They had held secret, private meetings in January 2015, with stakeholders, including Jean Charest, former Premier of Quebec who represented TransCanada at the time as a consultant. Board members were "supposed to handle all of their dealings with stakeholders in public." Conservative MP, Lisa Raitt said the board members made a mistake with Energy East. "The NEB is there to make sure they do everything legally, by the book...If I were the minister in charge, I would read them the riot act." Prior to the 2015 general election, then-Prime Minister Stephen Harper renewed the mandates of all nineteen politically-appointed permanent NEB members. This prevented the "incoming government from making its own appointments to the regulator before the next federal election, scheduled for 2019."

The proposed route crossed the "traditional territory of 180 different aboriginal communities", most of which were strongly against it. Each of the 180 may in law have had a veto under the United Nations Declaration on the Rights of Indigenous Peoples which Prime Minister of Canada Justin Trudeau had previously vowed to sign and uphold. This veto right was supported by some Canadian oil extraction corporations such as Suncor.

Energy East had generated controversy in various areas. Some communities through which it was proposed to pass (notably North Bay, Kenora, and Thunder Bay) opposed it categorically.

In partial response to these concerns, the NEB had planned to hear aboriginal oral evidence from 70 specific intervenors.

The project was also strongly opposed by some Canadians on scientific grounds. The Pembina Institute released a report urging the National Energy Board to consider the impact on carbon emissions, estimating the project's upstream impact as being between 30 and 32 million tonnes of carbon emissions per year. This position was supported by the Governments of Ontario and Quebec, who had wanted the impact of the project on greenhouse gases examined as part of the National Energy Board review process, but did not oppose the project in principle. The Ontario Energy Board also had right to assert its own conditions and jurisdiction, but did not before the project was cancelled.

Another controversial aspect was a new supertanker complex at the eastern end of the pipeline near Quebec City. Exploratory work was put on hold for a month after the Quebec Superior Court found that the Quebec environment ministry had not considered the impact of the project on beluga whales in the area. A public opinion poll held in Quebec found only one-third of Québécois supported the pipeline, while it was supported by one-half of Canadians outside of Quebec.

== Project endorsements and process concerns ==
The project was endorsed by the Liberal Government of New Brunswick, which claimed it would create over 2000 construction jobs in a province with 11% unemployment. Former Conservative Party of Canada Prime Minister of Canada Stephen Harper endorsed the project, as did the Government of Alberta. This endorsement was renewed by the former NDP Premier of Alberta Rachel Notley after her government's election in 2015. The Saskatchewan Legislature unanimously endorsed a motion supporting the pipeline in November 2014, and the Premier of Saskatchewan Brad Wall called on Prime Minister Harper "to take leadership in supporting TransCanada’s proposed Energy East pipeline". Accordingly, the provincial governments of Alberta, Saskatchewan and New Brunswick were in support. Wall and Notley had taken the position that Ontario and Quebec could not "veto" the pipeline.

The Maliseet First Nations raised concerns about the project during National Energy Board board hearings, but the six Maliseet first nations did not take a unified position on the project at that point, saying that they were reserving judgment pending the results of a traditional land use study and technical review. TransCanada said that it would "strive to reach consent" with the First Nations to avoid and mitigate any possible adverse effects of the Energy East pipeline.

Wall's (but not Notley's) position was that provincial equalization could be withheld from provinces that did not support the project. Ontario imposed approval conditions on Energy East but had dropped climate change concerns in December 2014. Quebec imposed an injunction on the Energy East pipeline until it had met all provincial environmental regulations.

After Justin Trudeau became prime minister as a result of the 2015 Canadian federal election, and the replacement of Conservative pro-pipeline MPs with Liberal Party of Canada MPs along the entire route of the pipeline in New Brunswick and part of the route in Quebec, the federal position became unclear. Trudeau had strongly condemned the Harper-era process of regulation, citing serious conflict of interest and mandate flaws, and had also promised to "work with the provinces to map out a plan to reduce Canada's collective carbon footprint within 90 days of taking office by putting a price on carbon pollution." Other Harper-era approvals such as Northern Gateway had been sharply criticized and even called a "farce" by some public officials objecting to the lack of oral cross-examination. Northern Gateway was ultimately cancelled as well by the federal government in November 2016.
