= Nakʼazdli Whutʼen =

- Band No. 614
- People: Dakelh
- Headquarters: Fort St. James
- Province: British Columbia

Land
- Main reserve: Nakʼazdli
- Reserves: List: Williams Prairie Meadow 1A; Tatselawas (Stuart River) 2; Sowchea 3, 3A; Uzta (Nahounli Creek) 4, 7A; Six Mile Meadow 6; Beaver Islands 8; Stuart Lake (Hungry Island) 9; Stuart Lake (Dunah Island) 10; Inzana Lake 12; Nehounlee Lake (Six Mile Lake) 13; Tatsadah Lake 14; Carrier Lake 15; Great Bear Lake 16; Mission Lands No. 17
- Land area: 14.56 km^{2} (5.62 sq mi)

Population (2025)
- On reserve: 705
- On other land: 72
- Off reserve: 1348
- Total population: 2125

Government
- Chief: Marion Colleen Erickson
- Council: 2024-2028: Noal Sagalon; Sam Fred; Sam Maddison; Sam Murial; Leonard Thomas; David Tibbetts; Paul Bird; Karla Olinek

Website
- www.nakazdliwhuten.ca

Nakʼazdli Whutʼen is a Dakelh First Nation band with a main community located next to the village of Fort St. James, British Columbia. The nation has 16 reserves totalling 1,458 hectares, and approximately 2,100 members living both on - and off reserve. The Nak'azdli Band chief is Aileen Prince.

The band was a member of the Carrier Sekani Tribal Council until 2018, when it resigned citing that it had 'outgrown' the need for joint representation and support.

== Geography ==
Nakʼazdli Whutʼen has a total of 16 reserves. IR#1 where the majority of on reserve members reside is situated at the south shore of Nakʼalbun (Stuart Lake) Sitting at the mouth of the Stuart River, Nakʼazdli is the head waters for the many salmon spawning grounds in the area. In 1996 the band had to deal with dropping salmon runs.
