= Bruderheim =

- Town
- Town of Bruderheim
- Location of Bruderheim in Alberta
- Coordinates: 53°48′15″N 112°55′40″W
- Country: Canada
- Province: Alberta
- Region: Edmonton Metropolitan Region
- Census division: 10
- Municipal district: Lamont County
- Adjacent specialized municipality: Strathcona County
- Incorporated
  - Village: May 29, 1908
  - Town: September 17, 1980

Government
  - Governing body: Bruderheim Town Council

Area (2021)
  - Land: 9.28 km^{2} (3.58 sq mi)
- Elevation: 637 m (2,090 ft)

Population (2021)
  - Total: 1,329
  - Density: 143.2/km^{2} (371/sq mi)
- Time zone: UTC−06:00 (Alberta Time)
- Highways: Highway 45; Highway 15
- Waterway: North Saskatchewan River
- Website: Official website

Bruderheim /ˈbruːdərhaɪm/ is a town in the Edmonton Metropolitan Region of Alberta, Canada. It is located just north of the junction of Highway 15 and Highway 45, approximately 47 km (29 mi) northeast of Edmonton.

The town's name is derived from two German words: "Bruder" meaning brother and the suffix "-heim" meaning home. In English, it translates to "Home of the Brother".

== History ==
Bruderheim was settled in 1894 by a group German Moravians from Volynia, in Ukraine. The area was the recipient of a notable meteorite fall on March 4, 1960—the Bruderheim meteorite.

Bruderheim Arena served as a shooting location for the 2005 film Santa's Slay.

== Demographics ==
In the 2021 Census of Population conducted by Statistics Canada, the Town of Bruderheim had a population of 1,329 living in 515 of its 552 total private dwellings, a change of 0.5% from its 2016 population of 1,323. With a land area of 9.28 km^{2} (3.58 sq mi), it had a population density of 143.2/km^{2} (370.9/sq mi) in 2021.

In the 2016 Census of Population conducted by Statistics Canada, the Town of Bruderheim recorded a population of 1,308 living in 502 of its 622 total private dwellings, a 13.2% change from its 2011 population of 1,155. With a land area of 7.12 km^{2} (2.75 sq mi), it had a population density of 183.7/km^{2} (475.8/sq mi) in 2016.

The population of the Town of Bruderheim according to its 2014 municipal census is 1,348, a 3.9% change from its 2012 municipal census population of 1,298.

== Notable people ==
- Emerance Maschmeyer, professional ice hockey goaltender for the Vancouver Goldeneyes and member of the Canada women's national ice hockey team. Maschmeyer won gold with the team at the 2021 IIHF Women's World Championship and the 2022 Winter Olympics.

== Gallery ==
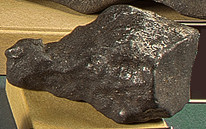
Fragment of Bruderheim meteorite

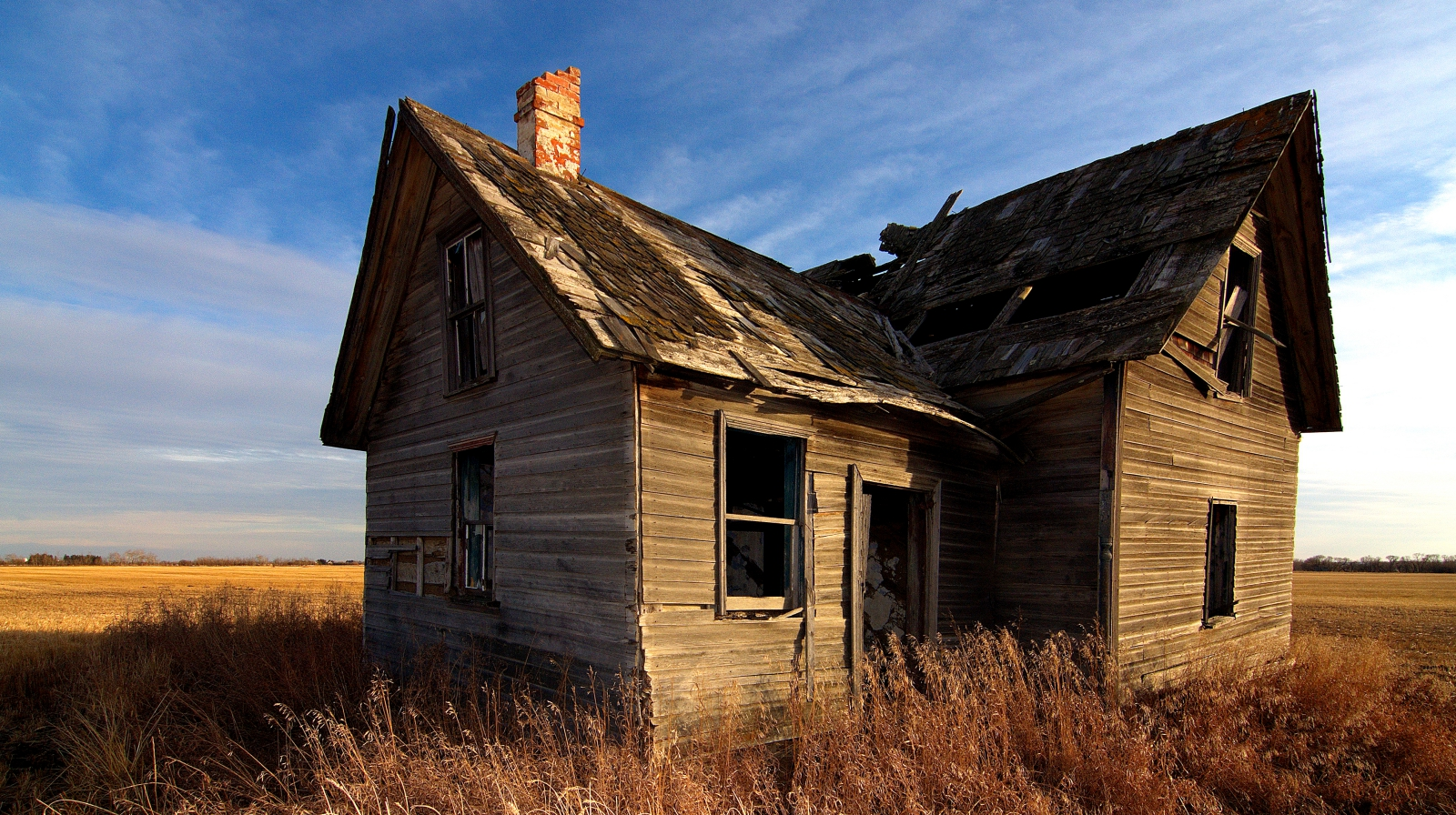
A derelict homestead near Bruderheim

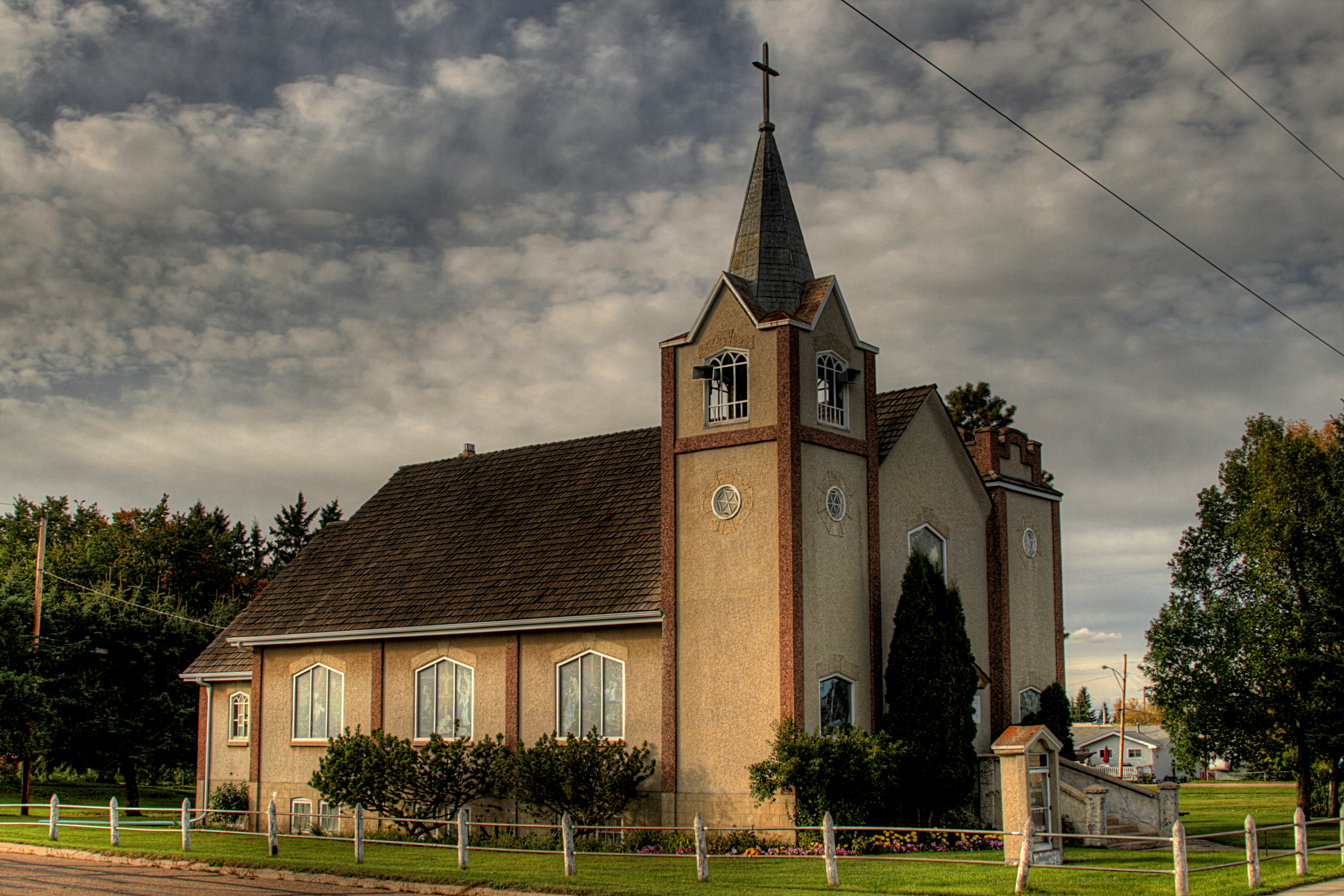
Bethlehem Lutheran Church in Bruderheim

== See also ==
- List of communities in Alberta
- List of towns in Alberta
