= National Energy Board =

Former Canadian government agency

Pipelines originating from Alberta regulated by the NEB (now, CER)

The National Energy Board was an independent economic regulatory agency created in 1959 by the Government of Canada to oversee "international and inter-provincial aspects of the oil, gas and electric utility industries." Its head office was located in Calgary, Alberta.

The NEB mainly regulated the construction and operation of oil and natural gas pipelines crossing provincial or international borders. The Board approved pipeline traffic, tolls and tariffs under the authority of the National Energy Board Act. It dealt with approximately 750 applications annually, through written or oral proceedings.

The National Energy Board also had jurisdiction over the construction and operation of international power lines, defined as lines built "for the purpose of transmitting electricity from or to a place in Canada from or to a place outside of Canada." The NEB authorized imports of natural gas, and exports of crude oil, natural gas, oil, natural gas liquids (NGLs), refined petroleum products and electricity. The NEB also had jurisdiction over designated inter-provincial power lines, by determination of the federal Cabinet, but no such line has been designated, leaving the regulation of existing interties to provincial regulatory bodies. Recent NEB decisions in favour of petroleum-industry interests have led to increasing controversy.

On 28 August 2019, the NEB Act was repealed by the coming into force of the Canada Energy Regulator Act (CER Act).

== Pending review ==
Prime Minister Justin Trudeau condemned the Harper-era process of regulation, and especially the NEB, citing serious conflict of interest and mandate flaws. As of December 2016, no changes to the Board had been announced.

=== Climate accounting ===
The NEB's lack of coherence on climate change is a major source of uncertainty. Ontario and Quebec had initially imposed approval conditions on Energy East regarding "upstream" emissions in Alberta, similar to those imposed both upstream and downstream by the EPA and Obama administration on Keystone XL. Both dropped these climate change concerns in December 2014, despite the Pembina Institute estimate that "Energy East would cause 32 million tonnes of added greenhouse-gas emissions every year, which would cancel out the emissions reductions Ontario achieved by closing all of its coal-fired power plants".

=== Provincial vetoes and equalization ===
Another complicating factor is the position of Brad Wall, Premier of Saskatchewan, that equalization can be withheld from provinces that do not support raw bitumen export.

=== Indigenous peoples' rights and veto ===
A final issue requiring federal clarification is the United Nations Declaration on the Rights of Indigenous Peoples. Under the UNDRIP, indigenous peoples on unceded lands, including those over which Northern Gateway and Energy East would need to pass, appear to most authorities to have a strict veto and not mere "consultation" rights as under Canada's 1981 constitution. That constitution was not agreed to by the province of Quebec nor aboriginal authority at any level.

This especially affects Energy East, as New Brunswick and Quebec Maliseet accordingly have strict authority under UNDRIP to unilaterally reject it, as its proposed route crosses their territory (and those of a total of 180 aboriginal / indigenous groups).

Opposition to Northern Gateway and Energy East is strong among natives. A veto is supported by some Canadian oil extraction corporations such as Suncor and Tembec. Indigenous groups have a long history of winning court challenges in Canada.

While the NEB does hear aboriginal oral evidence from 70 specific intervenors the NEB process created under Stephen Harper falls far short of the demands of aboriginal groups themselves.

=== Response to spills and leaks ===
In 2014 John Bennett, national program director for the Sierra Club Canada (SCC) criticized the NEB for considering changes in its approach to preventing oil spills in future offshore drilling in the Beaufort Sea. Current policy requires companies working in the Arctic to have the capability to drill a relief well in the same season to release pressure and stop oil flow in case of a blowout such as the one that happened with BP in the Gulf of Mexico. But the NEB has said that other equally effective methods would be considered.

=== Conflicts of interest ===
Economist Robyn Allan, questioned the July 28, 2015 appointment by the Governor in Council on behalf of the Office of the Prime Minister, of Steven J. Kelly — a former Kinder Morgan consultant — as a full-time member of the National Energy Board (Board). In a letter dated August 21, 2015 NEB Board of Directors chair David Hamilton and fellow Members, Alison Scott and Philip Davies wrote a In 1996 Kelly joined Purvin & Gertz, Inc. now IHS Inc. and was vice-president of IHS Global Canada, "an oil industry consulting firm hired by Kinder Morgan to do an economic study justifying the Trans Mountain pipeline expansion."

NEB postponed oral hearings scheduled for August 24 in Calgary to avoid a conflict of interest with Kelly's appointment which is effective October 13. Alternative dates have not yet been provided. Kinder Morgan has already filed copious amounts of IHS evidence with affidavits that was submitted by Steven Kelly in support of Kinder Morgan's application for the proposed pipeline expansion Trans Mountain. According to the NEB, all Kelly's evidence will be struck from the record.

=== Lack of oral cross-examination ===
The NEB process has been sharply criticized and even called a "farce" by former public officials objecting to lack of oral cross-examination.

== See also ==
- Electricity sector in Canada
- Energy policy of Canada
- History of the petroleum industry in Canada
- National Energy Program
