= Nyan Wheti =

Trail in British Columbia, Canada

Nyan Wheti is an ancient land route in northern British Columbia, Canada from the Dakelh villages on Fraser Lake (Nadlehbunk'ut) to villages on Stuart Lake (Nak'albun), about 50 km to the north. The name in Carrier means "The Way Across."

The trail, was part of the vast network called the Grease Trail which was used by the Dakelh people for as a major trade, travel and communication line. and its use only increased when European fur trade forts were set up on the two lakes, Fort Fraser and Fort St. James respectively. From Stuart Lake, the route follows Sowchea Creek south to Nanna (Chus-Kan) Lake, then past Marie (Kwah) Lake, Sutherland Lake, and Pitka Mountain, where it passes through the Porte de l'enfer (Hell's Gate) Pass, ending finally in Nadleh Village on Fraser Lake. From Nadleh, the Cheslatta Trail continues south to Cheslatta Lake.

At present, the trailhead in Fort St. James is located at the end of Baker Drive, off Sowchea road, between Paarens Beach Provincial Park and Sowchea Bay Provincial Park. It ends near the Nadleh Whut'en First Nation reserve, just off the Yellowhead Highway. It is a class 5 trail, and it recommended only for skilled hikers.
