= Stuart Lake =

Lake in British Columbia, Canada

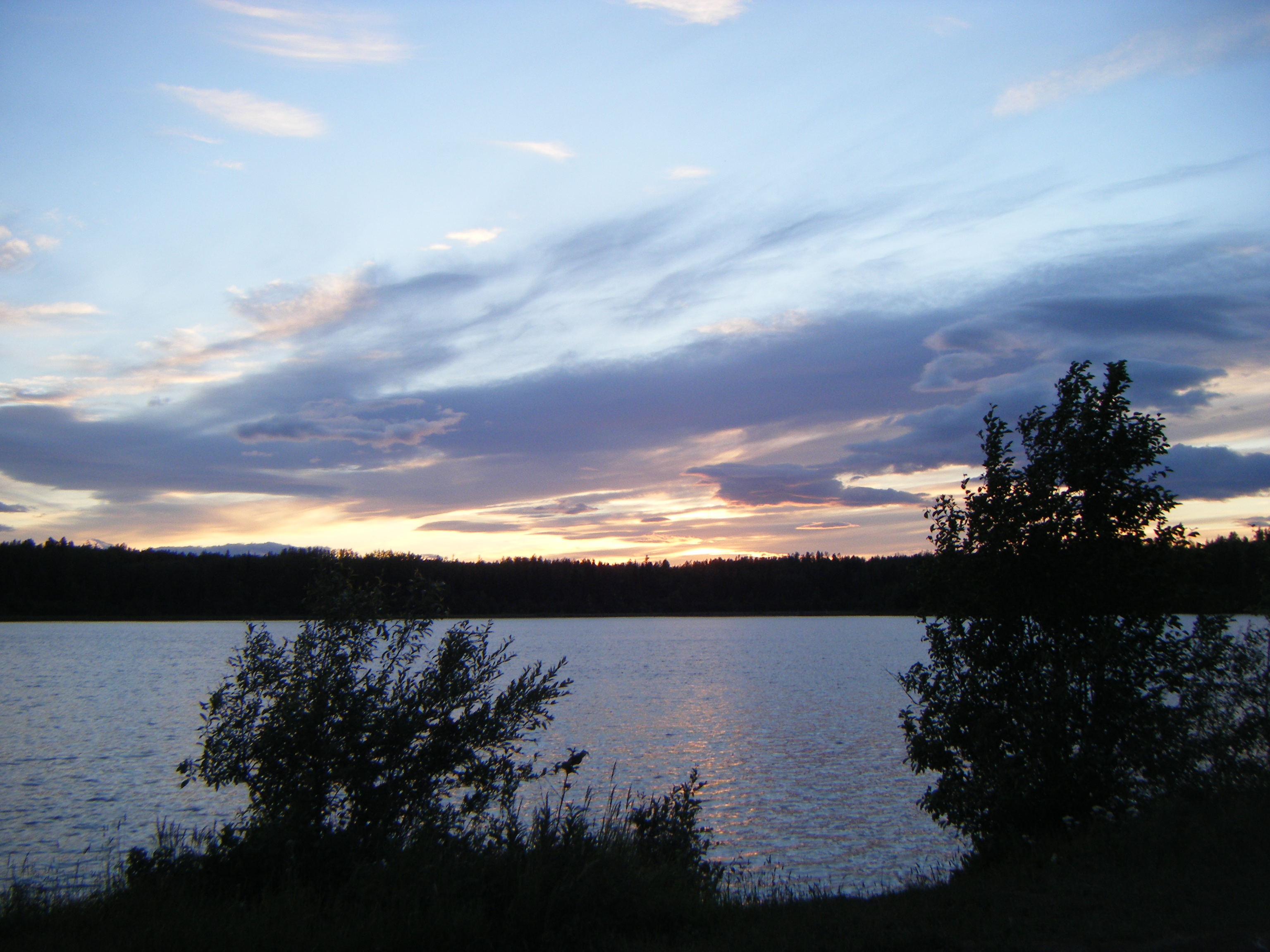

- Location within British Columbia
- Location: British Columbia
- Group: Nechako Lakes
- Coordinates: 54°33′N 124°35′W
- Catchment area: 14,600 km^{2} (5,600 sq mi)
- Basin countries: Canada
- Max. length: 90 km (56 mi)
- Max. width: 13 km (8.1 mi)
- Surface area: 358 km^{2} (138 sq mi)
- Average depth: 26 m (85 ft)
- Max. depth: 95 m (312 ft)
- Water volume: 9.3 km^{3} (7,500,000 acre⋅ft)
- Shore length^{1}: 170 km (110 mi)
- Surface elevation: 680 m (2,230 ft)
- Settlements: Fort St. James
- ^{1} Shore length is not a well-defined measure.

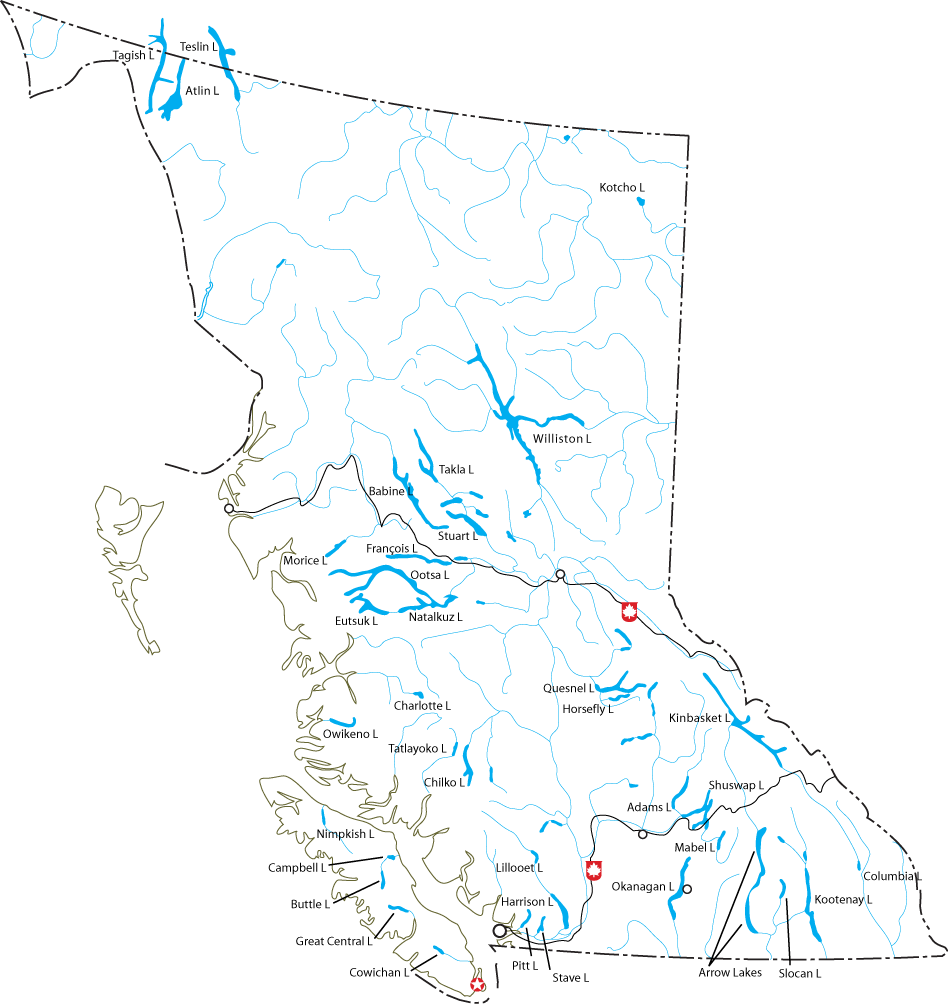
Lakes of British Columbia.

Stuart Lake, or Nak'albun ("Mount Pope Lake", Athapascan pronunciation: [nakʼalpʌn]) in the Carrier (Dakelh) language is a lake situated in the Northern Interior of British Columbia, Canada. The town of Fort St. James is situated by the lake near the outlet (Stuart River or Nak'alkoh - ″Mount Pope River″). Stuart Lake is 66 kilometres (41 mi) long, 10 kilometres (6.2 mi) wide and relatively shallow, with an average depth of 26 metres (85 ft). There are several privately owned islands on Stuart lake.

Stuart Lake offers a variety of recreational activities, including boating, canoeing, kayaking swimming, and sunbathing at sandy beaches. Fishing enthusiasts can enjoy the abundance of fish in the lake, while water skiing provides thrills for adrenaline seekers. Visitors can also explore ancient indigenous pictographs, camp in the surrounding areas, and engage in snowmobiling, ice fishing, ice sailing, and dog sledding during the winter months. Two provincial park campgrounds, Paarens Beach and Sowchea Bay, as well as a small municipal campground, are located on the southern shore of the lake. Additionally, there are several motels, lodges, and private campgrounds in the area to accommodate visitors. Moorage facilities are available at several marinas for those arriving by boat.

Fort St. James has several lumber mills as do several smaller aboriginal communities in the basin. The lake is usually ice-covered from mid-December to early May. Stuart Lake contains rainbow trout, char or lake trout, whitefish, kokanee, Dolly Varden, burbot fish and in deeper areas sturgeon (protected).

== Hydrographical characteristics of the lake ==
- Discharge 4.1 cubic kilometres per annum (0.98 cu mi/a)

== History ==
Villages on Stuart Lake or Nak'albun, were connected to Dakelh villages on Fraser Lake (Nadlehbunk'ut) on an ancient land route called Nyan Wheti Nyan Wheti in Carrier means "The Way Across." The trail was part of the network of trails called the Grease Trail used by the Dakelh people for as a major trade, travel and communication line. the Cheslatta Trail continues south to Cheslatta Lake.

Stuart Lake is important to British Columbia history, being the location of one of the oldest non-native settlements in the province, Fort St. James. The first non-native to visit the lake was James McDougall in 1806. McDougall's explorations were undertaken as an assistant to Simon Fraser. Fraser and other members of his expedition soon established a North West Company trading post, leaving behind for the winter a garrison led by clerk John Stuart, in whose honor the English name of the lake was given.

The original name, in the Dakelh language, is Nak'albun (Athapascan pronunciation: [nakʼalpʌn]), literally Mt. Pope Lake, after the mountain that overlooks it, Nak'al (Athapascan pronunciation: [nakʼal]), known in English as Mt. Pope. The changing of names of the lakes reflects the doctrine of discovery upheld by Canada's colonial government as well as the colonial history of the area.

In 2012, the "Mayor and Council of the District of Fort St. James unanimously voted to adopt a resolution declaring their opposition to the Enbridge Northern Gateway Project." Their decision was based on concerns for "the land base and our fresh water sources. Of particular concern locally is the crossing of the Stuart River, which accommodates one of the largest sockeye salmon runs in the world, and Pitka Creek which flows into Stuart Lake."
