= Fort Fraser =

Fort Fraser may refer to:

- Fort Fraser, British Columbia, an unincorporated community
- Fort Fraser (Florida), a US Army fort used from 1837 to 1838
- Fort Fraser (sternwheeler), a small ship named for the Canadian place
