= Nadleh Whutʼen First Nation =

First Nations government of the Dakelh people in British Columbia, Canada

Nadleh Whutʼen
- Band No. 612
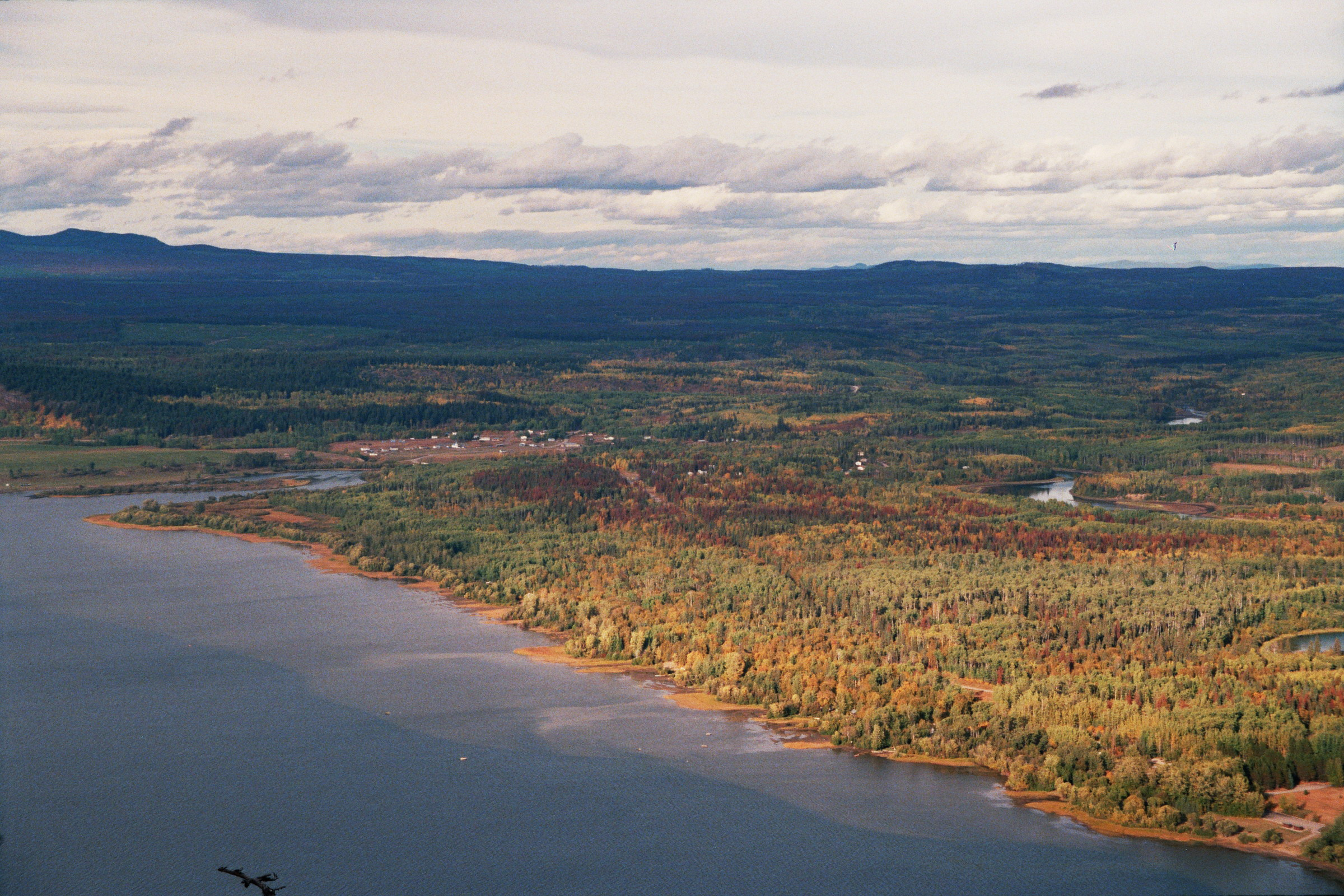
- Nadleh Whutʼen and Fraser Lake, view from Mt. Fraser
- People: Dakelh
- Headquarters: Fort Fraser
- Province: British Columbia

Land
- Main reserve: Nautley (Fort Fraser) 1
- Reserves: Fraser Lake 2; Yensischuck 3; Seaspunkut 4; Canyon Lake (Ormonde Lake) 7; Ormonde Creek 8; Fondeur 9
- Land area: 9.69 km^{2} (3.74 sq mi)

Population (2025)
- On reserve: 252
- On other land: 24
- Off reserve: 354
- Total population: 630

Government
- Chief: Beverly Ketlo
- Council: Ashely Heathcliff; Mark Alfred Lacerte; Eleanor (Lowe) Nooski; Cheryl (Lacerte) Parsons; Tanya Stump

Tribal Council
- Carrier Sekani Tribal Council

Website
- www.nadleh.ca

Nadleh Whutʼen First Nation (formerly Fraser Lake and Stellaquo) is a First Nations government of the Dakelh people, whose territory is located in the Central Interior of British Columbia, Canada, around the east end of Fraser Lake. The nation has seven reserves which Crown-Indigenous Relations and Northern Development Canada refer to as IR#1-9. (Reserves 5 and 6 split from Nadleh Whutʼen and make up Stellatʼen First Nation). Until 1990, it was referred to as the Fraser Lake Indian Band.

Nadleh Whutʼen has 630 registered members as of October 2025, of which half live on reserve.

== Geography ==
Most of the nation's members reside in Nadleh, the main community, while others (approximately 20) live in Lejac. Nadleh is located along the banks of the Nautley (Nadleh) river, between Fraser Lake and the Nechako River. Lejac is located on the south side of Fraser Lake, on the site of the former Lejac Residential School.

Facilities at the Nadleh reserve include the Band Office, Treaty/Lands Management Office, Forestry Office, Catholic Church, convenience store, fire hall, maintenance shop, adult learning centre, health centre, outdoor hockey rink, and community smokehouse.

The Nadleh Koh School is home to an Aboriginal Head Start Programme.

Facilities in Lejac (IR#4) include Lejac Auto Body and Rocky Mountain Log Homes. The Lejac Residential School (now closed) opened in 1922, and housed children who were removed from their families and communities in the region from Vancouver to Dease Lake.

Facilities on IR#8 include Ormond Lake Cultural Camp.

== Culture and government ==
The Nadleh Whutʼen speak a dialect of the Carrier language, which is part of the Athapaskan language family. Carrier people refer themselves as Dakelh, which means "people who travel by water".

The nation has one elected government chief and four elected government council members. The Nadleh Whutʼen practice the traditional system of balhats (potlatch) and have five clans, whose crests are: Bear, Frog, Caribou, Beaver and Owl.

Their traditional staple foods include salmon, moose, deer, small game, and berries, all of which are still collected by most band members each year for the winter.

== Language ==
- The majority of the community members of the Nadleh speak the dialect of Central Dakelh. Other dialects spoken within the community include,
  - Saik'uz
  - Nakazdli
  - Wet'suwet'en
  - Cheslatta
  - Tache
  - Chilcot'en
- All dialects of Dakelh spoken in Nadleh are part of the Athabasca language family.

== Points of interest ==
Pictographs can be found painted on granite rocks on the north side of Fraser Lake on IR#2. The drawings depict animals, fish and birds.

Beaumont Provincial Park is located on Nadleh Whutʼen traditional territory, next to the Nadleh village. It was the original site of Fort Fraser, a North West Company trading post. The first fort was built in 1806, but burned down and was later moved onto today's Nadleh reserve.

In September 2006, archaeologists uncovered an axe head near the Nadleh River and estimated it to be over 1,000 years old. There are also the remains of a fishing weir in the Nadleh river, estimated to be over 100 years old.

Each year in Lejac, Catholic churches celebrate Rose Prince, known to the Dakelh as Rose of the Carrier. In her honour, an annual pilgrimage gathers people from across Canada for three days to pray and celebrate their faith.

The Cheslatta Trail to Cheslatta Lake, and the Nyan Wheti route to Fort St. James connect at Nadleh/Nautley village (Nadleh, ᘇᘫᑋ).

== Prominent members ==
- Dr. Maggie Hodgson was nominated for the Order of Canada in 2006 by the Health Support Workers in Saskatchewan who work with Indian Residential School former students. She organized the first “Healing Our Spirit World Wide Gathering” in Edmonton, Alberta in 1992, with 3,200 participants from around the world. Her efforts in community development have earned her a National Aboriginal Achievement Award, now the Indspire Awards, the United Nations Community Development Award, the Canadian Public Health Community Development Award, the Alberta Aboriginal Role Model Award, and the Alberta Alcoholism and Drug Abuse Commission Award of Excellence.

== Affiliations ==
Nadleh Whutʼen First Nation is affiliated with the Carrier Sekani Tribal Council and is in treaty negotiations with the federal and provincial governments.

It is also affiliated with Carrier Sekani Family Services, an organization that focuses on physical and mental health and provides social services to its members.

In 2009, tribal members opposed the proposed Enbridge Northern Gateway pipeline, and rejected an equity offer in 2011. Opposition continued into 2012, in cooperation with the Yinka Dene Alliance.
