= Alexander MacKenzie Heritage Trail =

Historic trail in British Columbia, Canada

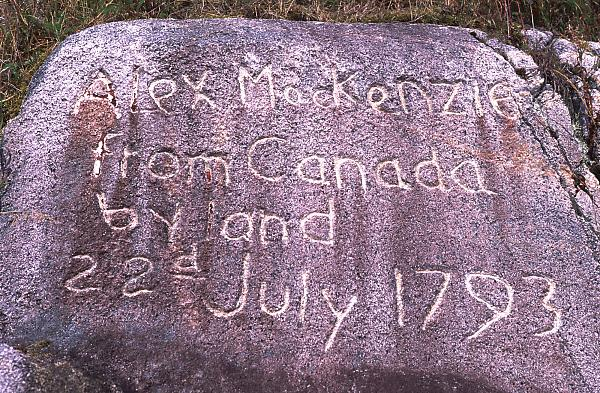
Inscription at the end of the Alexander Mackenzie's Canada crossing located at 52°22′43″N 127°28′14″W

The Alexander MacKenzie Heritage Trail (also Nuxalk-Carrier Route, Blackwater Trail, or simply The Grease Trail) is a 420 km (260 mi) long historical overland route between Quesnel and Bella Coola, British Columbia, Canada (53.269N,123.149W to 52.968N, 125.704W) Of the many grease trails connecting the Coast with the Interior, it is the most notable and often is referred to as the Grease Trail.

The trail was originally used by the Nuxalk and Carrier people for communication, transport and trade, in particular, trade in Eulachon grease from the Pacific coast.

During his trek from Montreal to the Pacific Ocean in the late 18th century, Alexander MacKenzie was led by Nuxalk and Carrier guides, when natural obstacles in the Fraser River prevented his continued water route.

Mackenzie's group "took the Parsnip River, crossed the continental divide, and eventually canoed down the Fraser River to Alexandria just south of Quesnel. On the advice of local First Nations people, who guided Mackenzie and his party to the Pacific Ocean, they gave up the river route for an overland one. The overland journey started just above the mouth of the Blackwater River at the West Road River west of Quesnel, taking them through the Upper Blackwater, along the Eliguk Lake and Gatcho Lake, through parts of what is now Tweedsmuir Provincial Park, over the Rainbow Mountains, into the Bella Coola Valley and "Friendly Village". The local people took the group down the Bella Coola River, over the salt water into the Dean Channel." He reached the ocean on July 20, 1793, completing the first recorded transcontinental crossing north of Mexico. The route was designated as an official heritage trail by the Heritage Conservation Act in 1987.

From east to west, the modern-day trail begins at the West Road River (Blackwater River) 53.269063 N,123.148917 W between Quesnel and Prince George, passes Kluskus Lake, Eliguk Lake, then crosses through what is now Tweedsmuir Provincial Park, then follows the Bella Coola River to the North Bentinck Arm inlet.

Because of its length and difficulty, experienced hikers can expect the route to take about 18 days, whereas intermediate hikers may require at least 24 days. Also, hikers may choose to hike only sections of the trail, such as the route through Tweedsmuir Provincial Park which passes the extinct Rainbow Range shield volcano. Only a few hiking or horse riding parties, plus a few ATVs or trucks, pass along the trail each year.

The middle section of the trail passes within 5 km of Pan Phillips' Home Ranch, popularized by the books by Rich Hobson, Grass Beyond the Mountains, Nothing Too Good for a Cowboy, and The Rancher Takes a Wife, and the CBC television series based on the same books. The Home Ranch closed operations in the early 1970s, but the remains of the ranch are in good shape.

== See also ==
- Hudson's Bay Brigade Trail
