= Southern Carrier language =

Endangered Athabaskan dialect group

Southern Carrier
- Lower Carrier
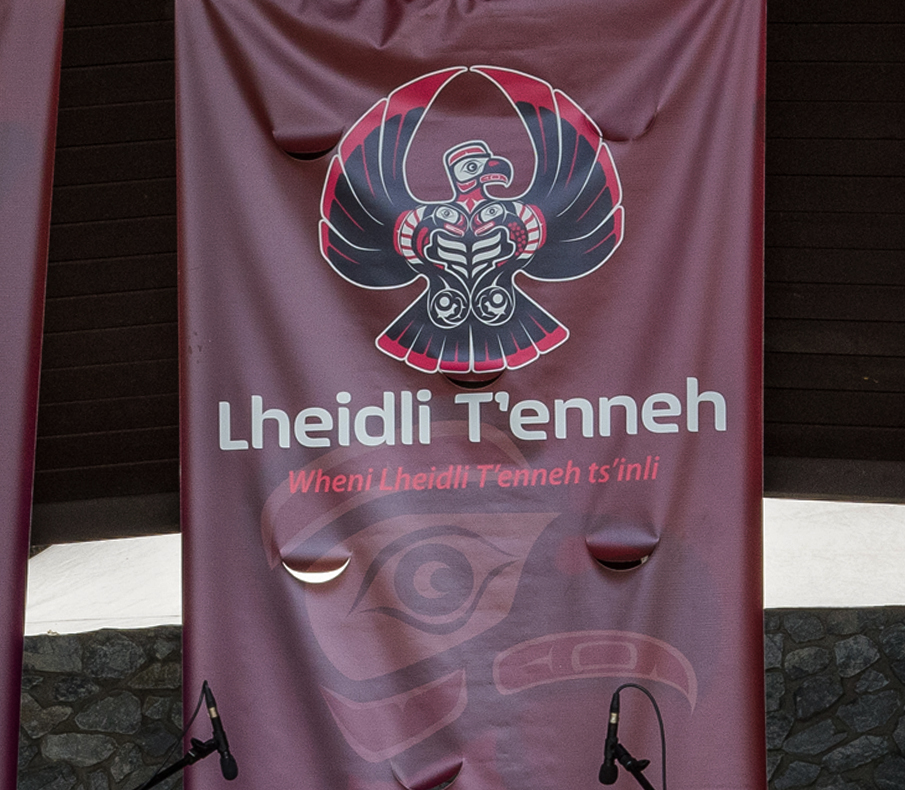
- Sign saying Wheni Lheidli T'enneh ts'inli meaning 'we are Lheidli T'enneh' in the Lheidli dialect.
- Native to: Canada
- Region: British Columbia
- Ethnicity: Dakelh
- Language family: Na-Dene: Athabaskan; Northern Athabaskan; Carrier; Southern Carrier
- Dialects: Fraser/Nechako; Blackwater

Language codes
- ISO 639-3: caf
- Glottolog: sout2958

In current scholarship, Southern Carrier designates the dialects of the Athabaskan Carrier language of British Columbia, Canada, other than the Stuart Lake dialect, that is, those spoken south of Fort St. James. In some earlier work, the term is restricted to what are here called the Blackwater Dialects, which Ethnologue considers to be a language distinct from Carrier.

== Dialects ==
The group is divided into two subgroups, Fraser/Nechako and Blackwater. The Fraser/Nechako subgroup includes the Lheidli, Saik'uz, Nadleh, Stelakoh, Stoney Creek, and Cheslatta dialects. The Blackwater subgroup is divided in turn into an Eastern Blackwater group, consisting of the Red Bluff, Nazko, and Kluskus dialects, and the Ulkatcho dialect.

== History ==
=== Documentation ===
The first record of the Carrier language consists of 25 words of this dialect written down by the explorer Alexander MacKenzie on June 22, 1793 and published in his journal.

There are modest dictionaries of the various dialects within this group, both on-line and in print.

== Current status ==
=== Teaching ===
Materials in Southern Carrier are limited and mostly not available outside the communities.

The Saik'uz and Lheidli dialects have been taught at university level by the University of Northern British Columbia and the College of New Caledonia.

== Grammar ==
Southern Carrier has an extremely extensive and productive system of noun classifications. It has multiple classification subsystems and they can take place in the same sentence or same verb.
