= Carrier syllabics =

Script for the Carrier language of British Columbia, Canada

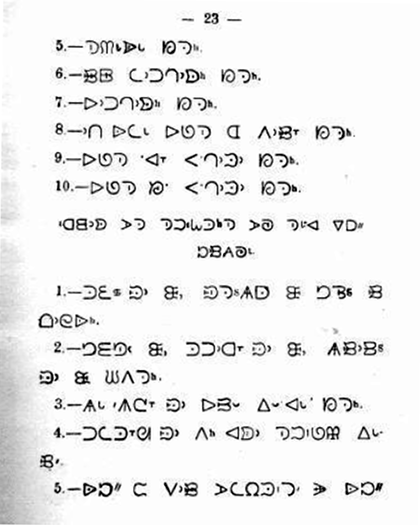
- Script type: graphically moraic alphabet
- Creator: Adrien-Gabriel Morice
- Period: Created in 1885, with its usage beginning to fade in the 1920s
- Languages: Carrier (Dakelh)

Related scripts
- Sister systems: Cree syllabary, which also influenced the design of the letters

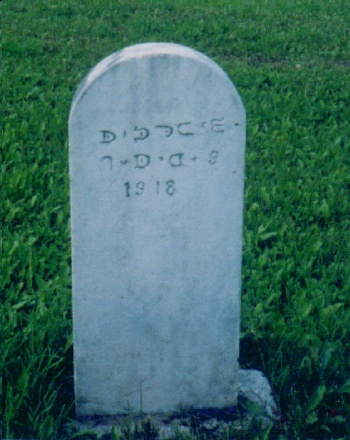
A tombstone in the Nak'azdli graveyard with a syllabic inscription. It says: Virginia died November 9th, 1918.

Carrier or Déné syllabics (ᑐᑊᘁᗕᑋᗸ, Dʌlk'ʷahke, (Dulkw'ahke) 'frog feet') is a writing system created by Adrien-Gabriel Morice for the Carrier language. It was inspired by Cree syllabics and is one of the writing systems in the Canadian Aboriginal syllabics Unicode range.

== History ==
The Dakelh people once enjoyed extensive literacy with the script. It is recorded that it was often used to write messages on trees, and Morice published a newspaper in syllabics which was in print from 1891 to 1894. Some transcriptions of Latin and English have been recorded as well. Its usage began to decline around 1920, when the Carrier language was banned from the local schools. In liturgical publications, such as prayer books, the Carrier language became written in a non-standard form of the Latin alphabet, which used many English sound values, such as ⟨oo⟩ for /u/ and ⟨u⟩ for /ʌ/.

In the 1960s, the Carrier Linguistic Committee (CLC) in Fort St. James created a standardized form of the Latin alphabet for usage in the Carrier language. This is now the preferred form of writing the language, although Carrier syllabics is still often seen as more authentic to the culture.

== Description ==
Carrier syllabics is designed so that syllables which begin with the same consonant have the same basic form. Depending on the following vowel, this form may be rotated, flipped, or a diacritic may be added in the centre which is a short stroke for ⟨e⟩ and a centre dot for ⟨i⟩. There are special characters for consonants that do not immediately precede a tautosyllabic vowel, which is to say coda consonants, the first of a sequence of two onset consonants, and the nasals when syllabic preceding another consonant. The glottal stop is also written using a separate character, even when it immediately precedes a tautosyllabic vowel.

Carrier syllabics is written from left to right. Morice originally intended to have regular spacing between words; however, in practice, the letters were sporadically spaced, and the gaps between them did not often correlate to separate words. There was no formally defined punctuation; Morice used the modern punctuation of the Latin alphabet.

	u ⟨oo⟩	o	ə ⟨u⟩	e	i	a	Isolated
∅	ᐁ	ᐃ	ᐅ	ᐈ	ᐉ	ᐊ	
ʔ ⟨'⟩	ᐧᐁ	ᐧᐃ	ᐧᐅ	ᐧᐈ	ᐧᐉ	ᐧᐊ	ᐧ
h	ᐯ	ᐱ	ᐳ	ᐶ	ᐷ	ᐸ	ᑋ
p ⟨b⟩	ᗨ	ᗩ	ᗪ	ᗫ	ᗬ	ᗭ	ᗮ
x ⟨kh⟩	ᗄ	ᗅ	ᗆ	ᗇ	ᗈ	ᗉ	ᐥ
ɣ ⟨gh⟩	ᗊ	ᗋ	ᗌ	ᗍ	ᗎ	ᗏ	ᐦ
w	ᗐ	ᗑ	ᗒ	ᗓ	ᗔ	ᗕ	ᐃ
xʷ ⟨wh⟩	ᗖ	ᗗ	ᗘ	ᗙ	ᗚ	ᗛ	
t ⟨d⟩	ᑌ	ᑎ	ᑐ	ᑓ	ᑔ	ᑕ	ᐪ
tʰ ⟨t⟩	ᗜ	ᗝ	ᗞ	ᗟ	ᗠ	ᗡ	
tʼ	ᗢ	ᗣ	ᗤ	ᗥ	ᗦ	ᗧ	
k ⟨g⟩	ᗯ	ᗰ	ᗱ	ᗲ	ᗳ	ᗴ	ᐟ
kʰ ⟨k⟩	ᗵ	ᗶ	ᗷ	ᗸ	ᗹ	ᗺ	ᐠ
kʼ	ᗻ	ᗼ	ᗽ	ᗾ	ᗿ	ᘀ	ᘁ
n	ᘂ	ᘃ	ᘄ	ᘅ	ᘆ	ᘇ	ᐣ
ng							ᐡ
m	ᘈ	ᘉ	ᘊ	ᘋ	ᘌ	ᘍ	ᑦ
j ⟨y⟩	ᘎ	ᘏ	ᘐ	ᘑ	ᘒ	ᘓ	
tʃ ⟨j⟩	ᘔ	ᘖ	ᘗ	ᘘ	ᘙ	ᘛ	
tʃʼ ⟨chʼ⟩	ᘜ	ᘝ	ᘞ	ᘟ	ᘠ	ᘡ	
l	ᘢ	ᘣ	ᘤ	ᘥ	ᘦ	ᘧ	ᑊ
tɬ ⟨dl⟩	ᘨ	ᘩ	ᘪ	ᘫ	ᘬ	ᘭ	
ɬ ⟨lh⟩	ᘮ	ᘯ	ᘰ	ᘱ	ᘲ	ᘳ	ᒡ
tɬʰ ⟨tl⟩	ᘴ	ᘵ	ᘶ	ᘷ	ᘸ	ᘹ	
tɬʼ ⟨tlʼ⟩	ᘺ	ᘻ	ᘼ	ᘽ	ᘾ	ᘿ	
z	ᙀ	ᙁ	ᙂ	ᙃ	ᙄ	ᙅ	ᙆ
ẕ							ᙇ
ts ⟨dz⟩	ᙈ	ᙉ	ᙊ	ᙋ	ᙌ	ᙍ	
s	ᙎ	ᙏ	ᙐ	ᙑ	ᙒ	ᙓ	ᔆ
⟨s̱⟩							ᣵ
ʃ ⟨sh⟩	ᙔ	ᙕ	ᙖ	ᙗ	ᙘ	ᙙ	ᙚ
tʃʰ ⟨ch⟩	ᙛ	ᙜ	ᙝ	ᙞ	ᙟ	ᙠ	
tsʰ ⟨ts⟩	ᙡ	ᙢ	ᙣ	ᙤ	ᙥ	ᙦ	
tsʼ	ᙧ	ᙨ	ᙩ	ᙪ	ᙫ	ᙬ	
kʷ ⟨gw⟩	ᐟᗐ	ᐟᗑ	ᐟᗒ	ᐟᗓ	ᐟᗔ	ᐟᗕ	
kʰʷ ⟨kw⟩	ᐠᗐ	ᐠᗑ	ᐠᗒ	ᐠᗓ	ᐠᗔ	ᐠᗕ	
kʷʼ ⟨kwʼ⟩	ᘁᗐ	ᘁᗑ	ᘁᗒ	ᘁᗓ	ᘁᗔ	ᘁᗕ	
ts ⟨dz⟩							ᐪ_{z}
tsʰ ⟨ts⟩							ᐪ_{s}
r	rᐁ	rᐃ	rᐅ	rᐈ	rᐉ	rᐊ	
v	ᘁᗨ	ᘁᗩ	ᘁᗪ	ᘁᗫ	ᘁᗬ	ᘁᗭ	ᘁᗮ

ᶣ is used followed by a bare-vowel character to write /f/ and /v/ in some Latin hymns included in the prayer book but is never used elsewhere.

In Father Morice's writing * is prefixed to proper names, but this is rarely found in writing by native speakers.

Unicode has interchanged the /tsʰ/ and /tʃʰ/ series compared to Morice (1890): they have /tsʰ/ (ch) and /tʃʰ/ (ts) rather than /tsʰ/ (ts) and /tʃʰ/ (ch) . Some fonts have ᘨ /tɬu/ dlu reversed: the serif should be on the left, as in lu, not the right as in tlu.

== Unicode ==
The Carrier syllabics are included in the Unified Canadian Aboriginal Syllabics block in Unicode.
