= Grease trail =

Type of overland trade route in America

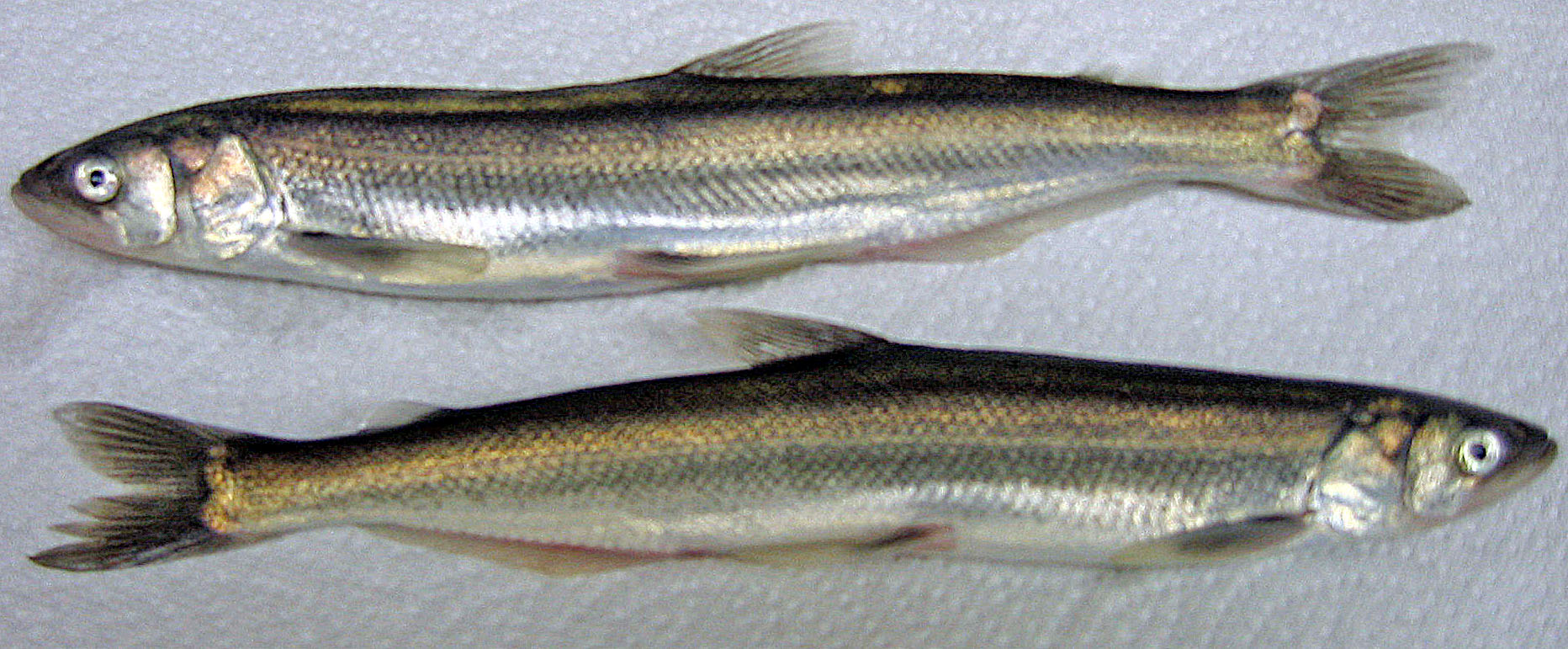
Eulachon

A grease trail is an overland trade route, part of a network of trails connecting the Pacific coast with the Interior in the Pacific Northwest.

== History ==
Trails were developed for trade between indigenous people, particularly the trade in eulachon oil (also spelled oolichan oil). The grease from these small fish could be traded for furs, copper, and obsidian, among other things. The Stó:lō people of the Fraser River simply ate the fish, either fresh or smoked, but the people of the interior used the oil as a condiment (similar to butter) and in various other ways.

== Origin of the name ==
"Grease Trail", Carrier /tl'inaɣeti/. The name comes from the fact that the most important item traded into the interior was the processed oil of the eulachon fish Thaleichthys pacificus. Indeed, the Carrier word /tl'inaɣe/ "eulachon oil" is a compound of Carrier /xe/ "grease, oil" (combining form /ɣe/) with /tl'ina/, a loan from Heiltsuk or Haisla, North Wakashan languages spoken on the coast.

"Because these trails were commonly used to transport Oolichan grease, they are now referred to as 'grease trails.' For thousands of years, First Nations traders followed well-trodden 'grease trails,' usually the easiest routes across plateaus, highlands and over challenging mountains far into the western interior, back-packing heavy boxes of valuable Oolichan grease, held in place by cedar rope 'tump-lines,' attached to headbands. The trails, operating on a relay system, covered a geographic area from what is now the Yukon Territories in Canada south to what is now northern California in the United States and as far east as central Montana and Alberta, to interior peoples like the Babine, Carrier and other Athabaskans."

== Grease trails and former grease trails ==
- Alexander MacKenzie Heritage Trail
- Chilkoot Trail
- Cheslatta Trail
- Dalton Trail
- Nyan Wheti
