= Cheslatta Trail =

Ancient land route in British Columbia, Canada

The Cheslatta Trail (or Tsetl'adak ts'eti in Carrier) is an ancient land route in British Columbia, Canada, that stretched from the Dakelh villages of Belhk'achek and Sdughachola on Cheslatta Lake to Nadleh Village on Fraser Lake. It was used by the Dakelh people for as a major trade, travel and communication line, until the construction of the Alcan Kenney Dam in 1952 caused flooding of the Cheslatta River and Cheslatta Lake, forcing the Cheslatta people from their lakeside villages.

From Nadleh, the trail would have passed through the modern day Beaumont Provincial Park and across Highway 16, then south of Dry William Lake. Today, it begins at km 7.5 on the Holy Cross Forest Road (6 km west of Beaumont Park on Highway 16). The trail then traverses 60 km of forest, passing Klez, Chowsunkut, Hallet, Bentzi, Targe, and Holy Cross Lakes along the way. It ends at the site of Belhk'achek village, near the mouth of Knapp Creek on Cheslatta Lake.

The end of the Cheslatta Trail in Nadleh met with the beginning of the Nyan Wheti, another land route, from Fraser Lake to Stuart Lake.
