= Nautley River =

Coordinates: 54°05′07″N 124°35′45″W

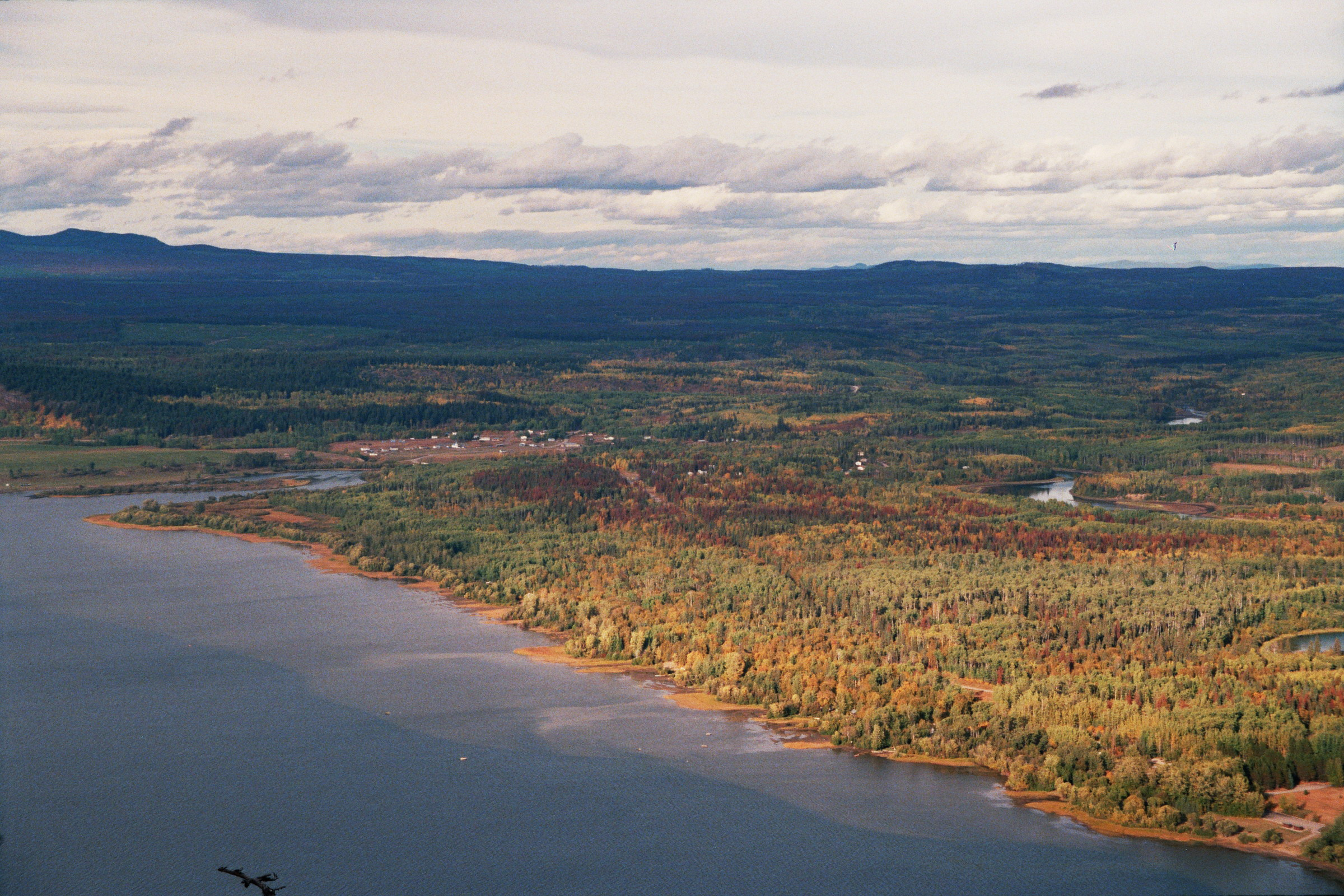
Nadleh

Nautley River (Dakelh: Nadlehkoh - ″Where the salmon return creek″ or Nadleh - ″(fish) run″) drains Fraser Lake into the Nechako River in the Central Interior of British Columbia, Canada.

Only 800 metres (2,600 ft) long, it is one of the shortest rivers in the province and one of the shortest rivers in the world, along with Powell River, the Wannock River at Rivers Inlet, and the Little River connecting Shuswap and Little Shuswap Lakes.

There is a long-standing feud between proponents of Powell River and those of the Nautley River over which body is the shortest. The river is entirely on the Nadleh Whut'en First Nation reserve.

== See also ==
- List of rivers of British Columbia
