= Fort Fraser (sternwheeler) =

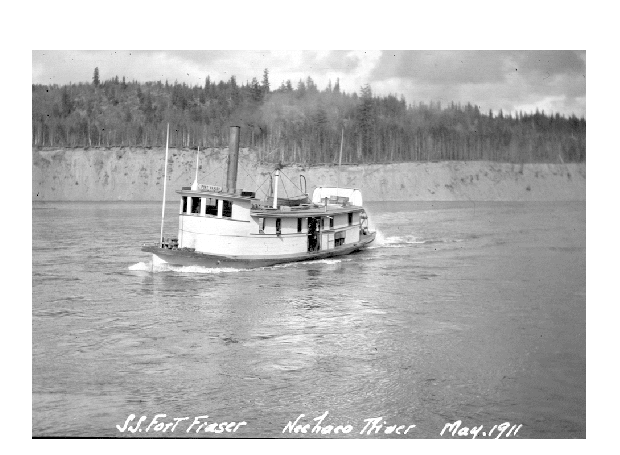
- Fort Fraser on the Nechako River 1911

History

Canada
- Name: Fort Fraser
- Laid down: 1910 at Soda Creek, British Columbia
- Launched: June 1910 at Soda Creek
- In service: 1910–1913
- Renamed: re-registered as Doctor 1913
- Fate: Retired

General characteristics
- Length: 56 ft (17.1 m)
- Beam: 11.8 ft (3.6 m)
- Notes: No. 126944

Fort Fraser was a small sternwheeler owned by the Fort George Lumber and Transportation Company a partnership originally held by Nick Clarke and Russell Peden from the Fort George town-site of South Fort George. Fort Fraser was intended to be a small prospecting craft that could service not only the Soda Creek to Fort George section of the upper Fraser River but also the Nechako River and some of its tributaries, enabling her to serve her namesake town of Fort Fraser.

Fort Fraser was launched in late June 1910 and was put under the command of Captain John Bonser, who was transferred from the company's other sternwheeler, the Nechacco. Piloted by Bonser, Fort Fraser pioneered the upper reaches of the Fraser River, not only successfully navigating the Grand Canyon of the Fraser but also travelling further upriver, thus becoming the first sternwheeler to reach the head of navigation at Tête Jaune Cache. Because of her small size and ability to travel on rivers that were previously unnavigated, she was often chartered by pioneer surveyor, Frank Swannell.

Despite these fine accomplishments, the Fort Fraser was never considered to have played a large role during the next few hectic years of rail construction, as the Grand Trunk Pacific Railway crossed the Alberta–British Columbia border in 1912 and made its way towards Fort Fraser, where the last spike would be driven on April 7, 1914.

In 1911, Captain Bonser left the Fort Fraser and returned to the Skeena River to pilot the new sternwheeler, Inlander. Fort Fraser was then put under the command of Captain George Ritchie, who was without a ship due to the loss of the Nechacco that April, in the ice at the Cottonwood Canyon. Under Ritchie's command, the Fort Fraser would work intermittently until late 1913 when she would be rebuilt and renamed Doctor after Dr. JK McLennan, a new partner in the company which had also been renamed, and was now the Fort George Lumber and Transportation Company. Outside short local trips, it is not recorded that the Fort Fraser did any work on the upper Fraser after late 1913.

== See also ==
- Steamboats of the Upper Fraser River in British Columbia
- List of ships in British Columbia
