= Adrien-Gabriel Morice =

French missionary priest and linguist

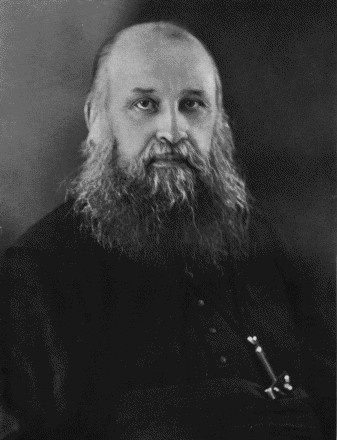
- Father Adrien-Gabriel Morice
- Born: 27 August 1859; Saint-Mars-sur-Colmont, France
- Died: 21 April 1939 (aged 79)
- Occupations: Oblate missionary, author, linguist

Adrien-Gabriel Morice (27 August 1859 – 21 April 1939) was a missionary priest belonging to the Oblates of Mary Immaculate. He served as a missionary in Canada, and created a writing system for the Carrier language.

== Early life ==
Father Morice was born and raised in France, in the commune of Saint-Mars-sur-Colmont in the département of Mayenne, in the Pays de la Loire region. As a seminarian he was inspired by Father Émile Petitot and set himself the goal of becoming a missionary and explorer in Northwestern Canada. He arrived in British Columbia in 1880, and after a stint in Williams Lake at St. Joseph's school, where he studied Chilcotin and, with the aid of Jimmy Alexander, the son of a Carrier woman and a fur trader who was sent to St. Joseph's School, began his study of Carrier.

== Work with aboriginal languages ==
In 1885 his dreams were realized and he was posted to Fort St. James, the fur trading and missionary center in the Carrier region. Father Morice rapidly learned the Carrier language and became the only missionary to speak more than rudimentary Carrier. Within a few months of his arrival he created the first writing system for Carrier, the Carrier syllabics, by making a radical adaptation of the Cree syllabics. From 1891 to 1894 he published a bimonthly newspaper, the Dustl'us Nawhulnuk, in Carrier. He was responsible for the translation of the catechism and many hymns and prayers into the language.

Father Morice was the first person to recognize all of the phonological distinctions in an Athabascan language and write it accurately.

He was also the first person produce extensive documentation of an Athabascan language. His magnum opus was his massive two volume The Carrier Language: A Grammar and Dictionary, which immediately made Carrier by far the best documented Athabascan language of the time.

== Disputes with the Church ==
Father Morice would have preferred to remain in Fort St. James but in 1904 he was withdrawn by the bishop, who finally paid heed to the complaints of the Hudson's Bay factor. Father Morice proved unwilling to perform the other duties the bishop assigned him and unable to get along with other priests, so after several years of conflict the Church set him up in a house in Winnipeg where he spent the remainder of his life as a scholar, writing extensively on Carrier language and culture, more general Athabaskan topics, the history of the Roman Catholic church in Western Canada, the history of the French and Métis of the West, and occasional other topics.

== Legacy ==
Morice River, Morice Lake, Morice Range, Camp Morice (Fort Saint James), and Moricetown – all located in the Bulkley region of northwest British Columbia, are named in honour of Morice. In 2018, Moricetown reverted to its original name of Witset.

== Bibliography ==
- Carrière, Gaston (1972) Adrien-Gabriel Morice, o.m.i. (1859–1938) Essai de bibliographie, Revue de l'université d'Ottawa 42.325–341
- Morice, Adrien-Gabriel (1897) Au Pays de L'ours Noir Chez les Sauvages de la Colombie Britannique. Paris: Delhomme et Briguet.
- Précis de grammaire nahanaise (1899) OCLC 471016473
- Morice, Adrien-Gabriel (1910) History of the Catholic Church in Western Canada. vol. 1, vol. 2 Toronto
- Morice, Adrien-Gabriel (1932) The Carrier Language: A Grammar and Dictionary. Mödling bei Wien, St. Gabriel, Austria: Verlag der Internationalen Zeitschrift "Anthropos".
- Morice, Adrien-Gabriel. The History of the Northern Interior of British Columbia formerly New Caledonia, 1660 to 1880 (Toronto, 1904).
- Morice, Adrien-Gabriel (1908) Dictionnaire Historique Des Canadiens Et Des Métis Français De L' Ouest.
- Mulhall, David (1986) Will to Power: The Missionary Career of Father Morice. Vancouver: University of British Columbia Press.
