= Carrier Linguistic Committee =

The Carrier Linguistic Society (CLS), formerly the Carrier Linguistic Committee, is a First Nations not-for-profit organization that works to preserve the Carrier language. It was incorporated under the Societies Act of British Columbia in 1973 and maintains both an online and physical presence in Fort St. James. Upon establishment, the Carrier Linguistic Society also included a list of the official aims of the CLS.

1. To promote literacy programs among the people of the Carrier Nation.
2. To produce literacy materials, such as primers, readers, workbooks, teacher's guides, supplements, visual aids, maps songs, dictionaries, histories, legends, and culture.
3. To train teachers and develop an ongoing program of teacher training, which could in time involve other language groups in B.C.
4. To create professional positions through teacher training and creative workshops.
5. To motivate Carrier young people towards higher education and profession.
6. To preserve the Athabaskan culture evidenced among the Carrier people.
7. To enrich the existing school systems by exposure to the study of the Carrier language and culture.
8. To publish whenever funds are available, as much literature as possible, in the Carrier language.
9. To provide information to the general public, concerning the programs in progress.
10. To function as a regulating body in the area of seeking funds, and exercise authority over the distribution of any funds received by the CLC.
11. To set quality standards for the literacy materials and teacher qualifications.

The Carrier Linguistics Society is credited with the creation and implementation of the Carrier Linguistic Committee writing system. This system is influenced by the Latin alphabet, and is widely regarded as the most popularly used Dakelh/Carrier writing system. Additionally, the CLS has published various Carrier and English-Carrier bilingual dictionaries and primers intended for both bilingual language learning and classroom language acquisition in several different Carrier dialects. They have also published multiple Carrier-translated short stories, texts, and oral transmissions meant to facilitate language learning that, like the dictionaries and primers, are available in several different Carrier dialects. Many of these texts are available for purchase at the CLS bookstore based in Fort St. James, which also includes multiple Carrier and English-Carrier bilingual workbooks, CDs and DVDs, songbooks, and storybooks.

The Carrier Linguistic Society also worked in collaboration with Nak'azdli Elders and the First Peoples' Cultural Council to establish an online Dakelh language archiving, teaching, and learning platform on the website FirstVoices. The CLS has also played a large role in the curriculum development and the implementation of Carrier language classes being taught at eight local schools and worked in collaboration with the University of Northern British Columbia to establish the Education Diploma in a First Nations Language and Culture (Dakelh / Carrier) at the University of Northern British Columbia.

== Notable Publications ==
- Antoine, Francesca (1974). Central Carrier bilingual dictionary. Fort St. James, B.C.: Carrier Linguistic Committee. OCLC 33088288.
- Wilkinson, David B (1975). Nak'azdli Bughuni, 1: workbook. Fort St. James, B.C.: Carrier Linguistic Committee. OCLC 15765567.
- Wilkinson, David B (1976). Nak'azdli bughuni, 2: workbook. Fort St. James, B.C.: Carrier Linguistic Committee. OCLC 15751584.
- Austin, Ileen; Prince, Nellie; Reid, Wilma (1977). Carrier teacher's manual for oral instruction. Fort St. James, B.C.: Carrier Linguistic Committee. OCLC 6650426.
- Austin, Ileen (1977). Ts'oodunne Hik'uyalhduk-i = [Children's stories] book one. Fort St. James, B.C.: Carrier Linguistic Committee. ISBN 9780920366127. OCLC 15851279.
- LeBrun, Mary (1977). Ts'oodunne Hik'uyalhduk-i = [Children's stories] book two. Carrier Linguistic Committee. ISBN 0920366120. OCLC 858628156.
- Walker, Dick (1977). Teacher's manual and lesson plan for Nak'azdli bughuni, books one and two. Fort St. James, B.C.: Carrier Linguistic Committee. OCLC 858628327.
- Rossetti, Bernadette (1983). Kw'eh ts'u haíndene = The descendents of Kwah. Fort St. James, B.C.: Carrier Linguistic Committee. ISBN 0920366155. OCLC 15949587.
- Prince, Elicho (1984). To the Nahani and back by trail ...: a real life adventure of Elicho. Fort St. James, B.C.: Carrier Linguistic Committee.
- Walker, Shirley (1985). Nek'uyalhduk-i = Our language. Fort St. James, B.C.: Carrier Linguistic Committee. ISBN 092036618X. OCLC 498894465.
- Carrier Linguistic Society (2005). Carrier prayer and hymn book. Fort St. James, B.C.: Carrier Linguistic Society. OCLC 1016451279.
- Walker, Shirley (2007). Historical Sketch of the Carrier Linguistic Society. Fort St. James, B.C.: Carrier Linguistic Society. pp. 1–24.
