= Last Spike (Grand Trunk Pacific Railway) =

Ceremony for the completion of Grand Trunk Pacific Railway

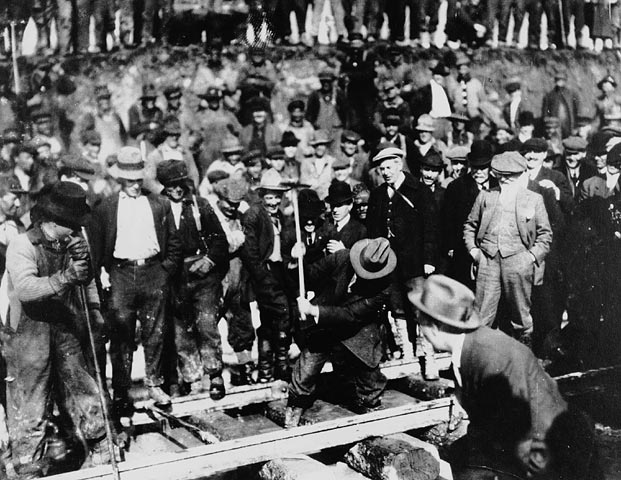
The Last Spike: Fort Fraser, BC, 1914

The Last Spike of the Grand Trunk Pacific Railway was driven one mile east of Fort Fraser, British Columbia, Canada on April 7, 1914.

== History ==
The Grand Trunk Pacific Railway commenced construction in British Columbia in 1908. This was one of the most difficult sections of track ever to be laid in North America and would cost approximately $112,000 per mile. There were two ends of construction, one being built from Prince Rupert, east and one from Winnipeg, Manitoba, west. In British Columbia, the railway had to cope with incredibly difficult terrain, extreme weather conditions and a shortage of workers. For example, the 186-mile (299 km) section of track from Prince Rupert to Hazelton took four years to complete (1908–1912), in part because the construction of the 80-mile (130 km) section from Prince Rupert to the Kitselas Canyon required 12 million pounds (5,400 t) of explosives that were used in the creation of three tunnels that had to be blasted through solid rock.

The costs of building the railway through the Northern Interior of British Columbia were much higher than the company had projected and disputes with rival town-site holders, especially at Hazelton and Fort George cut even deeper into the company's profits.

Then, in 1912, the Grand Trunk Pacific was dealt another blow when its general manager Charles Melville Hays died in the sinking of the Titanic. Despite these obstacles and tragedies, the railway was completed and the vision of Charles Hays was finally realized.

== Ceremony ==
On April 7, 1914, the Grand Trunk Pacific Last Spike ceremony was held 1.5 kilometres east of Fort Fraser, BC, approximately 135 kilometres west of what is now Prince George.

The president of the Grand Trunk Pacific, Edson J. Chamberlain and Alfred Waldron Smithers, chairman of the board of directors, and other officers of the company all arrived by train from Winnipeg and Montreal, while from Prince Rupert, more dignitaries came for the ceremony, among these, General Superintendent W.C.C. Mehan, Superintendent G.A. McNichol, Division Engineer C.C. Vanarsdol and Assistant Engineer W.H. Tobey.

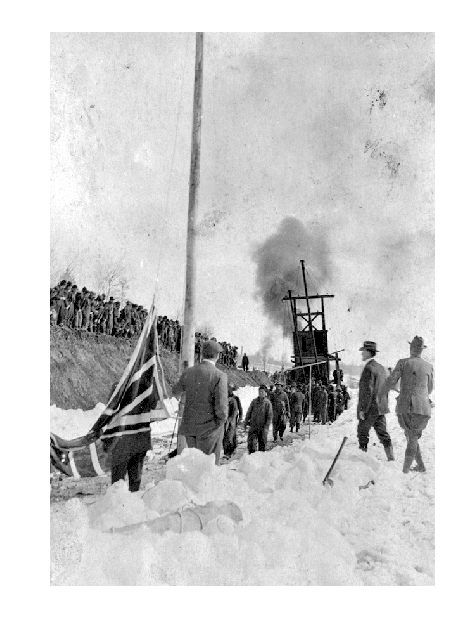
GTP track-layer ready to race

The ceremony began with a race between the track-layers and crews from the eastern and western ends of construction. The last mile had been left unfinished and each crew was timed to see who could complete their last half mile the fastest. The eastern crew won by a margin of only a few minutes and then the western crew placed the last rail.

Edson Chamberlain drove the last spike, (not a golden one but a standard black iron one), and once he completed that task, he gave gold watches to the men in charge of each crew. Painted on the last tie was "Point of Completion April 7th, 1914". After the ceremony, that last 11-foot (3.4 m) section of rail was removed and sliced into sections and then polished and engraved. The pieces were given to railway officials as paper-weights. One of these is in the possession of the Prince George Railway and Forestry Museum.

== See also ==
- Last Spike (Canadian Pacific Railway)
