= Stellatʼen First Nation =

- Band No. 613
- People: Dakelh
- Headquarters: Fraser Lake
- Province: British Columbia

Land
- Main reserve: Stellaquo (Stella) 1
- Reserve: Binta Lake 2
- Land area: 8.51 km^{2} (3.29 sq mi)

Population (2025)
- On reserve: 209
- On other land: 18
- Off reserve: 413
- Total population: 640

Government
- Chief: Robert Michell
- Council: Kane Casimel; Norman Charlie; Yvonne George; Clifford Louis

Tribal Council
- Carrier Sekani Tribal Council

Website
- www.stellaten.ca

Stellatʼen First Nation is the band government of the Stellatʼen subgroup of the Dakelh people in the Omineca Country of the Central Interior of British Columbia, Canada, 160 km west of Prince George, B.C.

== Chief and Councillors ==
As of March, 2022:

- Chief: Robert Michell
- Councillor: Yvonne George
- Councillor: Tannis Reynolds
- Councillor: Kenneth Schmidt
- Councillor: Walter Ward

== Treaty process ==
Stellatʼen First Nation history (http://stellaten.ca/Portals/0/forms/timeline.pdf)

1700s

1807: Simon Fraser wrote a letter detailing events he had witnessed in Stella.

1821: Peter Skene Ogden was made chief trader of the Hudson's Bay Company.

1800s

1857: Gradual Civilization Act.

1880: Father Morice and Father Coccola came to the Fraser Lake and Fort St. James area.

1885: Arrival of Father A.G. Maurice.

1892: The Fraser Lake Indians are officially recognized, and a reserve is created. Stellatʼen First Nation and Nadleh Whut’en Band were put together as one band by the government.

1900s

1901: Provincial Government asks for a reduction of the number of reserves.

1911: Barricade Treaty.

1958-60: Stellaquo Indian Reserve separates from the Fraser Lake Indian Band

1922-76: Lejac Indian Residential school in operation

1976: Lejac Residential School closed.

1989: Stellaquo is recognized as 613 Ir. No 1 and Binta Lake as Ir. No 2.

Band History Stellaten.ca timeline

== Demographics ==
Number of Band Members: 613
