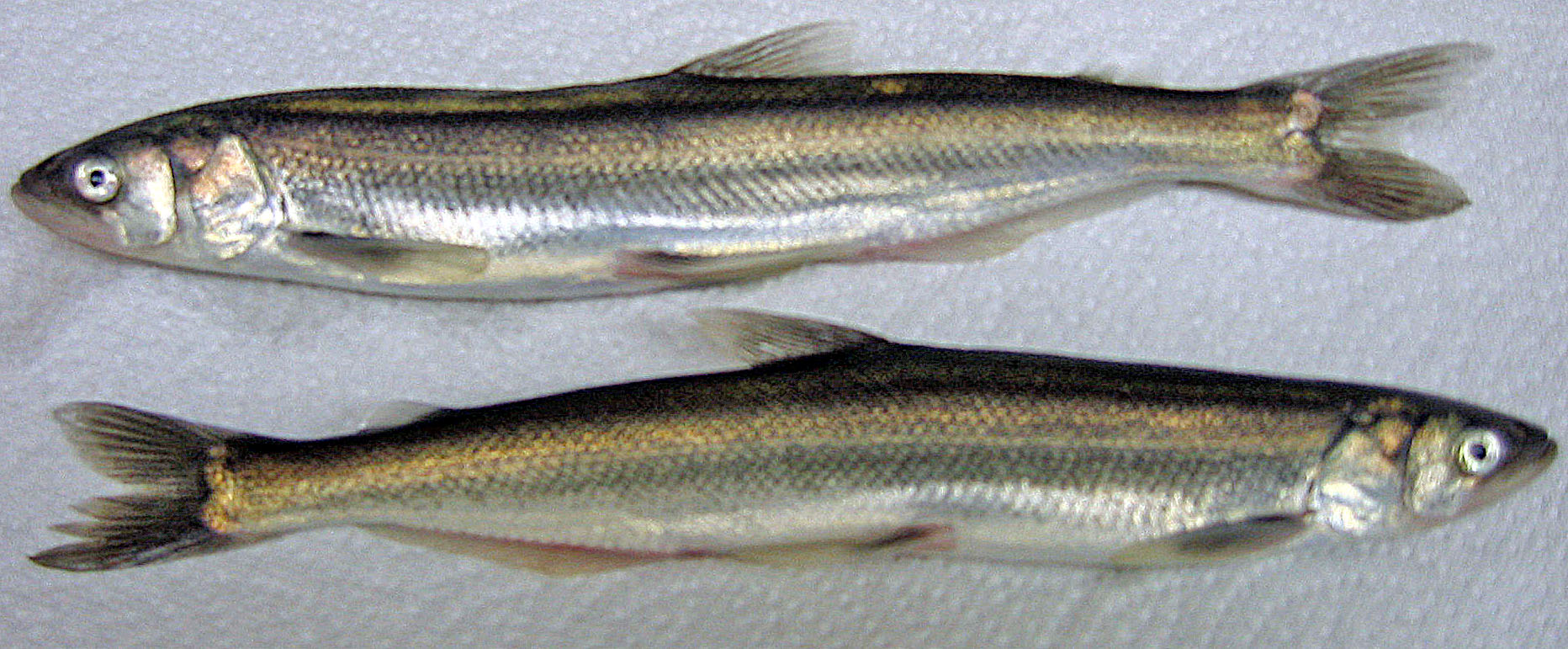

Conservation status
- Least Concern (IUCN 3.1)

- Secure (NatureServe)

Scientific classification
- Kingdom: Animalia
- Phylum: Chordata
- Class: Actinopterygii
- Division: Teleostei
- Order: Osmeriformes
- Family: Osmeridae
- Genus: Thaleichthys; Girard, 1858
- Species: T. pacificus

Binomial name
- Thaleichthys pacificus (J. Richardson, 1836)

Synonyms
- Lestidium parri Chapman, 1939; Osmerus albatrossis Jordan & Gilbert, 1898; Osmerus pacificus (Richardson, 1836); Salmo pacificus Richardson, 1836; Thaleichthys stevensi Girard, 1858

= Eulachon =

Species of fish

The eulachon (/ˈjuːləkɒn, -lɪkən/; Thaleichthys pacificus), or the candlefish, is a small anadromous species of smelt that spawns in some of the major river systems along the Pacific coast of North America from northern California to Alaska.

== Etymology ==
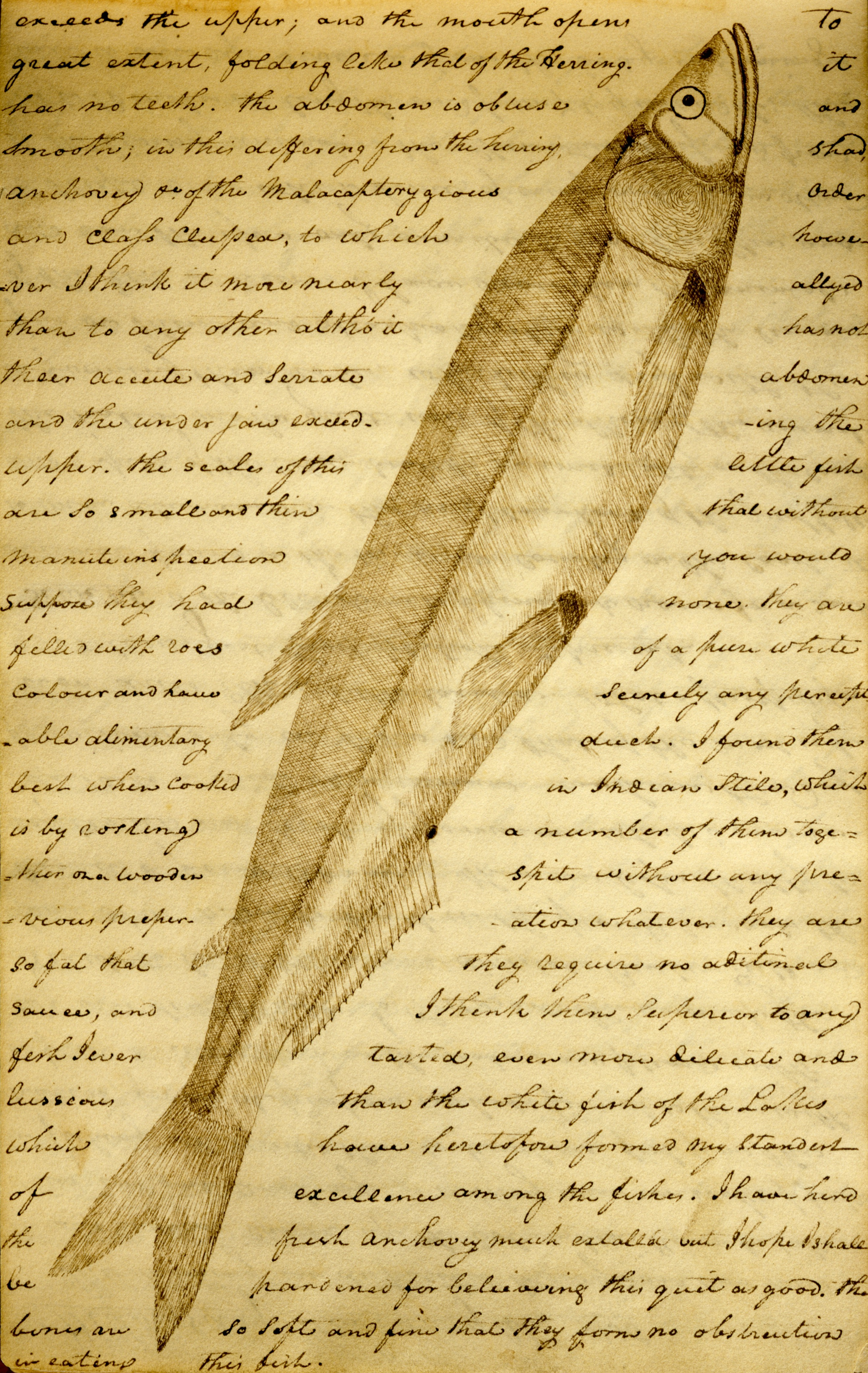
First ever documentation of this species recorded in the journal of the Lewis and Clark Expedition on February 25, 1806, at Fort Clatsop

The name "candlefish" derives from it being so fatty during spawning, with up to 15% of the total body weight in fat, that if caught, dried, and strung on a wick, it can be burned as a candle. This is the name most often used by early explorers. The name eulachon (occasionally seen as oolichan /ˈuːlɪkɑːn/, ooligan /ˈuːlɪɡən/, hooligan /ˈhuːlɪɡən/, oulachon, and uthlecan) is from the Chinookan language and the Chinook Jargon based on that language. One of several theories for the origin of the name of the state of Oregon is that it was a corruption from the term "Oolichan Trail", the native trade route for oolichan oil. In some parts it is also known as "halimotkw", which can be translated as "savior fish" or "salvation fish", due to its availability for fishing often coming at the end of winter, when food supplies typically run low.

The unrelated sablefish Anoplopoma fimbria is also called "candlefish" in the United Kingdom.

== Species description ==
Eulachon are distinguished by the large canine-like teeth on the vomer bone and 19 to 31 rays in the anal fin. Like salmon and trout they have an adipose fin (aft of the dorsal); it is sickle-shaped. The paired fins are longer in male fish than in females. All fins have well-developed breeding tubercles (raised tissue "bumps") in ripe males, but these are poorly developed or absent in females. Adult coloration is brown or blue on the back extending to the top of the head, lighter to silvery white or light blue on the sides, and white on the ventral surface; speckling is extra fine, sparse, and restricted to the back. Adults can reach maximum lengths of 30 cm (12 in) but most adults are between 15 and 20 cm (6 and 8 in). Adults have striae on their operculum that aid in distinguishing Thaleichthys pacificus from other smelt. They feed on plankton but only while at sea.

== Ecology ==
Eulachon feed primarily on plankton as well as fish eggs, insect larvae, ocean debris and small crustaceans. It forms an important part of the diet of many ocean and shore predators, and serves as a prominent food source for people living near its spawning streams.

Eulachon, as anadromous fish, spend most of their adult lives in the ocean but return to their natal freshwater streams and rivers to spawn and die. As such, one stream may see regular large runs of eulachon while a neighboring stream sees few or none at all. Regular annual runs are common but not entirely predictable, and occasionally a river which has large runs sees a year with no returns; the reasons for such variability are not known. The eulachon run is characteristic for the early portion being almost entirely male, with females following about midway through the run to its conclusion. Males are easily distinguished from females during spawning by fleshy ridges which form along the length of their bodies.

== Economics and trade ==
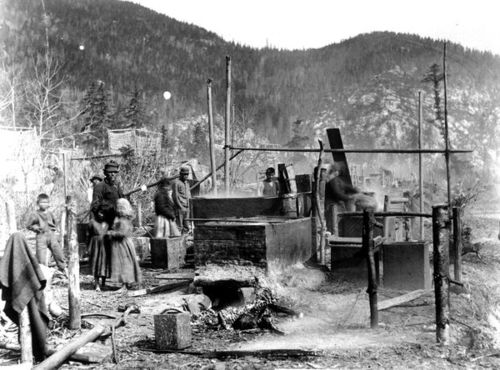
Eulachon rendering camp at the mouth of the Nass River, 1884

Indigenous communities of the Pacific Coast from California to Alaska have long made eulachon an important part of their diet, as well as a valuable trade item with peoples whose territories do not include spawning rivers. Eulachon are so important that the Nisga'a, for instance, define the beginning of the new year as the month of Xsaak, literally translated as "to eat eulachons", when the fish returns to freshwater to spawn. This marks the end of winter foods and the start of feasting, both for the Nisga'a and the many animals that arrive at the Nass River at that time of year.

Eulachon is caught using traps, rakes, and nets, with other residents taking part in the exploitation of the large runs. Today harvested eulachon are typically stored frozen and thawed as needed. They may also be fried, dried, smoked, or canned. Eulachon are also processed for their rich oil. The usual process allows the fish to decompose (rot) for a week or more in a hole in the ground, then add boiling hot water and skim off the oil, which would rise to the surface, being less dense than water. Eulachon oil (also known as "Eulachon grease") is traded with inland communities; as a result, the trails over which the trade was conducted came to be known as grease trails. Other uses of eulachon by non-Natives include bait for sportfishing and food for cats and dogs.

== Conservation status ==
In November 2008, the National Marine Fisheries Service (NMFS) received a petition from the Cowlitz Tribe to list a distinct population segment (DPS) of eulachon from Washington, Oregon, and California, (the so-called Southern DPS) as an endangered or threatened species under the Endangered Species Act. (ESA). NMFS found that this petition presented enough information to warrant conducting a status review of the species. Based on the status review NMFS proposed listing this species as threatened on March 13, 2009. On March 16, 2010, NOAA announced that the Southern DPS of eulachon will be listed as threatened under the ESA, effective on May 17, 2010 (See: the Federal Register notice published on May 18, 2010, at 74 FR 3178). On September 6, 2017, the NMFS approved a recovery plan intended to serve as a blueprint for the protection and recovery of the southern Distinct Population Segment (DPS) of eulachon (Thaleichthys pacificus) using the best available science per the requirements of the Endangered Species Act.

In Canada, the Central Pacific Coast and Fraser River populations were classified as endangered by the Committee on the Status of Endangered Wildlife in Canada (COSEWIC) in 2011. At that time, the Nass / Skeena Rivers population was given threatened status, but this was downgraded to Special Concern status when the Nass / Skeena Rivers population was individually reassessed by COSEWIC in 2013. As of May 2023, a decision is pending on the listing of these populations under Schedule 1 of the Species at Risk Act.

Overall, the species faces multiple threats, including overharvest, pollution, loss of freshwater spawning habitat due to logging, diversion and dam construction and climate change. Canadian spawning runs have been severely depleted compared to historic levels, while abrupt declines were reported in the Columbia, Fraser and Klinaklini rivers in 1994.
