= Beaumont Provincial Park =

Provincial park in British Columbia, Canada

- IUCN category II (national park)
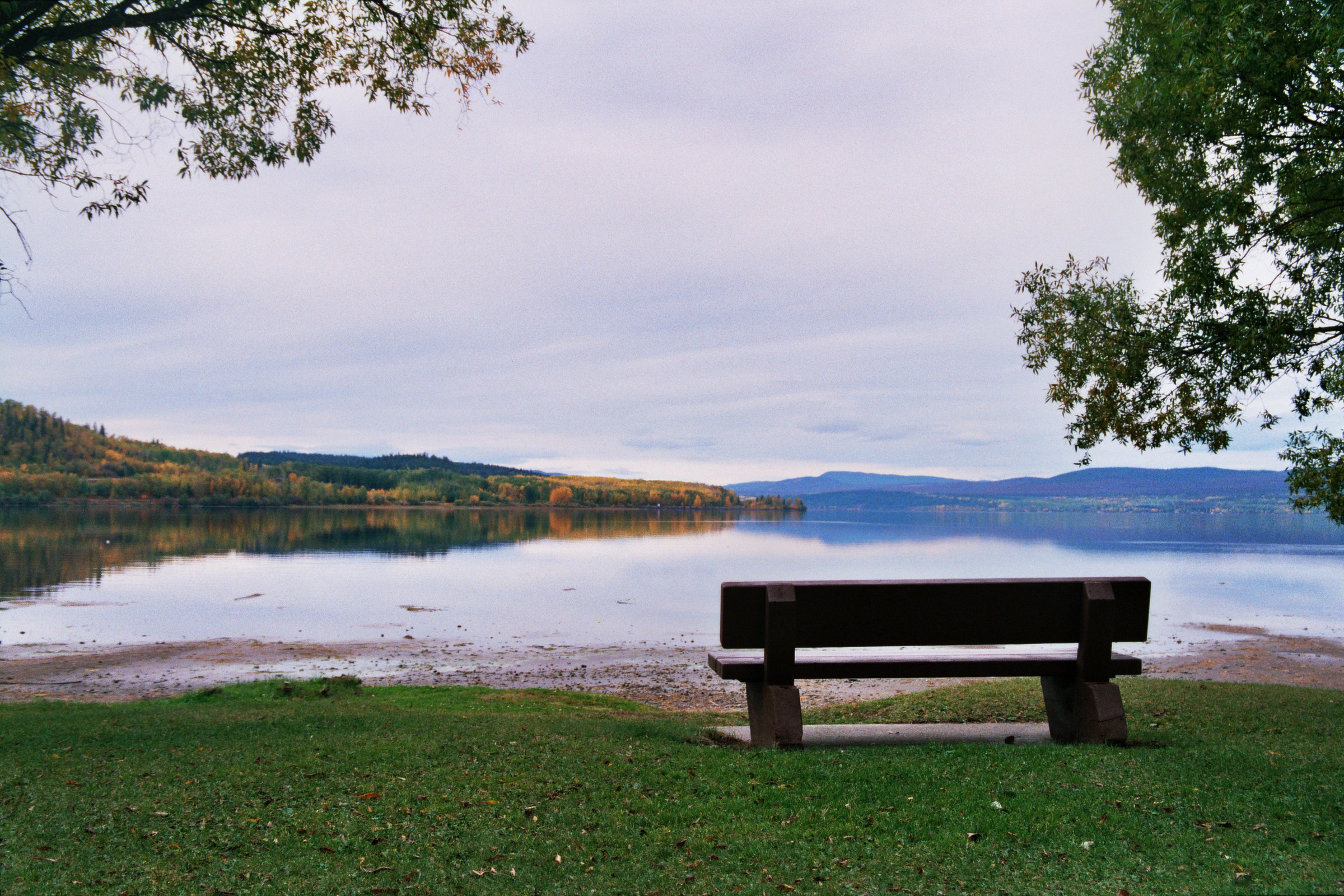
- A view of Fraser Lake from the beach at Beaumont Provincial Park

- Location within British Columbia
- Interactive map of Beaumont Provincial Park
- Location: Range 5 Coast Land District, British Columbia, Canada
- Nearest city: Prince George, BC
- Coordinates: 54°03′29″N 124°37′00″W
- Area: 178 ha (440 acres)
- Established: February 16, 1960
- Governing body: BC Parks

Beaumont Provincial Park is a provincial park located at the southeast end of Fraser Lake, between Fort Fraser and the town of Fraser Lake, British Columbia, approximately 40 kilometres (25 mi) west of Vanderhoof, British Columbia. The park contains the site of the original Fort Fraser.

Facilities in the park include campsites, a boat launch, a day picnic area, a swimming beach and a sani-station.

== Fraser Mountain ==
There is a 4 kilometres (2.5 mi) long trail up Mount Fraser that starts across the highway but still within the Beaumont park boundary. At the top is an old forest service tower that provides a clear view of the surrounding area. Some of the steepest sections of the trail once made up a small ski hill, which operated in the late 60s and early 70s, complete with a rope-tow. It takes an estimated 3 hours to ascend the mountain. The trailhead is located between the park entrance and Piper's Glen Resort.
