= Fort Fraser, British Columbia =

Village in British Columbia, Canada

Coordinates: 54°03′51″N 124°32′54″W

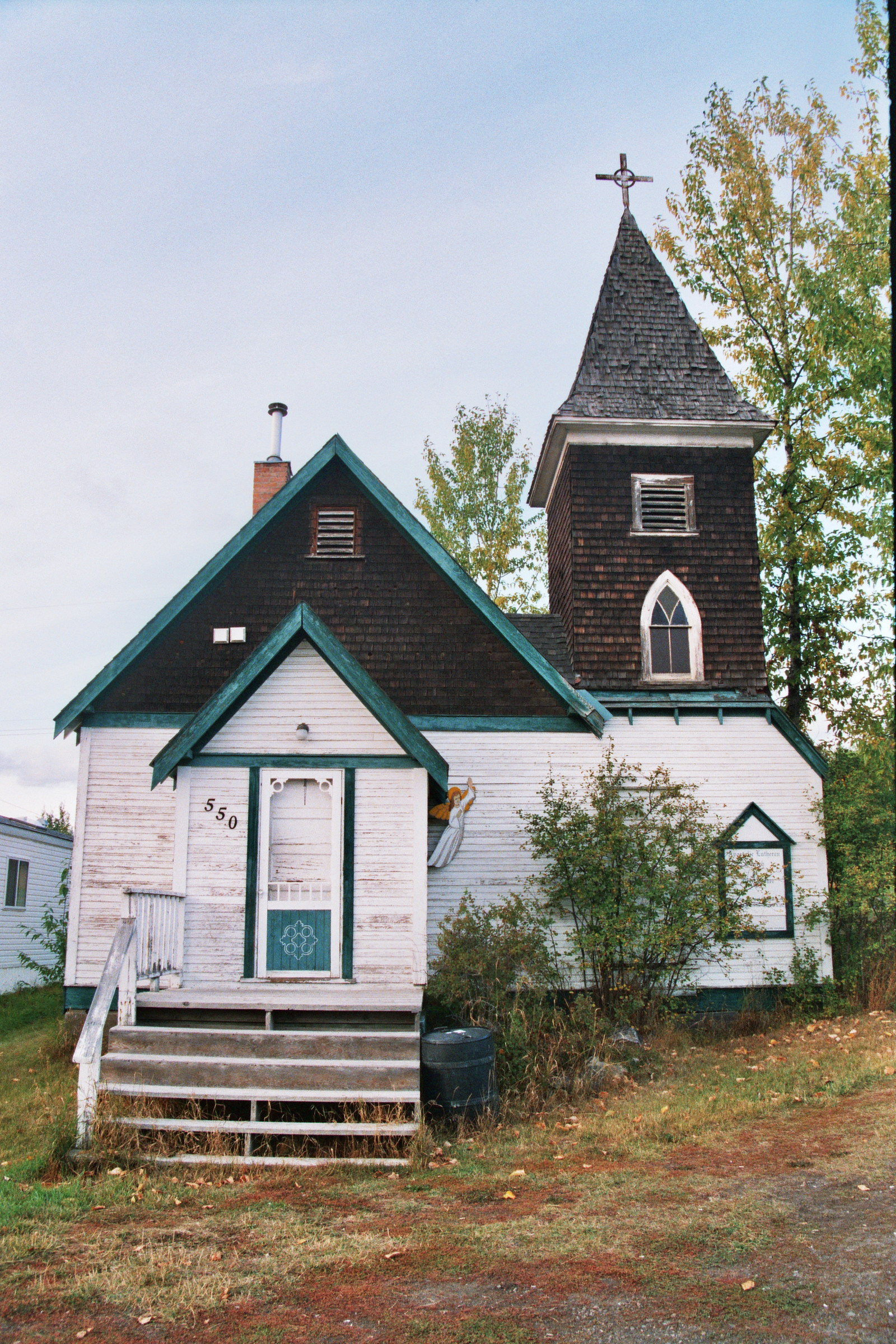
The Apostolic Lutheran Church in Fort Fraser

Fort Fraser is an unincorporated village of about 500 people, situated near the base of Fraser Mountain, close to the village municipality of Fraser Lake and the Nechako River. It can be found near the geographical centre of British Columbia, Canada, 44 km (27 mi) west of Vanderhoof on the Yellowhead Highway. Originally established in 1806 as a North West Company fur trading post by the explorer Simon Fraser, it is one of present-day British Columbia's oldest permanent European-founded settlements. The area around the community is also recorded as the site of the first land in British Columbia cultivated by non-First Nations people.

The original site of the fort is 4 km (2 mi) to the west, in Beaumont Provincial Park. In 1911, the fort was relocated to nearby Nadleh Village, and later closed in 1915. The present community is located at the site of the last spike of the Grand Trunk Pacific Railway, driven on April 7, 1914. Today, Fort Fraser is an active community sustained by both forestry and tourism.

== Transportation ==
Via Rail's Jasper–Prince Rupert train calls at the Fort Fraser station.

== Local events ==
The Fort Fraser Fall Fair is one of the oldest agricultural fairs in BC. The event has run annually since 1928, on the Labour Day weekend in September.

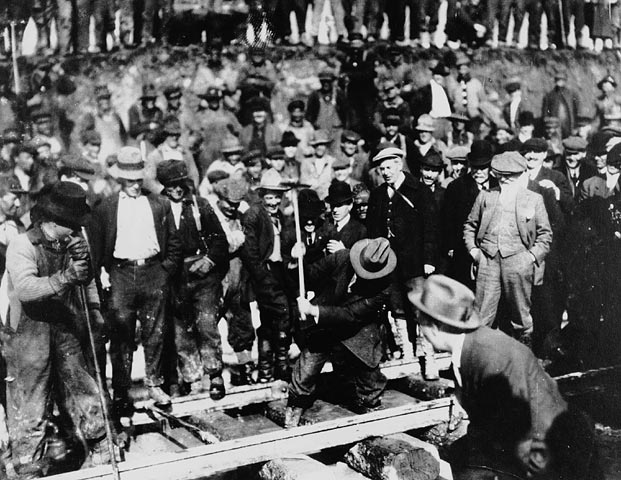
Driving of the last spike of the Grand Trunk Pacific Railway at Fort Fraser, April 7, 1914

== Local facilities ==
Local facilities include:

- Three churches - United Church of Canada, Apostolic Lutheran Church (est. 1928 by St. Mary's Anglican Church), and Church of the Nazarene
- Gas station/grocery store
- Automotive repair garage, tire sales
- Community hall
- Post-office
- Motel
- Laundromat
- Visitor information centre

== Climate ==
Climate data for Fort Fraser
Month	Jan	Feb	Mar	Apr	May	Jun	Jul	Aug	Sep	Oct	Nov	Dec	Year
Record high °C (°F)	12.0 (53.6)	14.5 (58.1)	19.0 (66.2)	28.9 (84.0)	35.5 (95.9)	32.0 (89.6)	33.5 (92.3)	35.5 (95.9)	34.0 (93.2)	26.0 (78.8)	17.0 (62.6)	14.0 (57.2)	35.5 (95.9)
Mean daily maximum °C (°F)	−4.1 (24.6)	−0.3 (31.5)	6.1 (43.0)	11.5 (52.7)	16.9 (62.4)	19.9 (67.8)	22.4 (72.3)	22.5 (72.5)	17.4 (63.3)	10.0 (50.0)	0.3 (32.5)	−4.5 (23.9)	9.8 (49.6)
Daily mean °C (°F)	−9.0 (15.8)	−6.2 (20.8)	−0.7 (30.7)	3.9 (39.0)	8.9 (48.0)	12.2 (54.0)	14.5 (58.1)	14.2 (57.6)	9.8 (49.6)	4.0 (39.2)	−4.0 (24.8)	−9.1 (15.6)	3.2 (37.8)
Mean daily minimum °C (°F)	−13.9 (7.0)	−12.1 (10.2)	−7.4 (18.7)	−3.6 (25.5)	0.9 (33.6)	4.5 (40.1)	6.5 (43.7)	5.8 (42.4)	2.1 (35.8)	−2.0 (28.4)	−8.3 (17.1)	−13.6 (7.5)	−3.4 (25.9)
Record low °C (°F)	−45.5 (−49.9)	−43.0 (−45.4)	−38.3 (−36.9)	−16.0 (3.2)	−7.0 (19.4)	−3.0 (26.6)	−2.5 (27.5)	−5.0 (23.0)	−9.0 (15.8)	−29.0 (−20.2)	−44.5 (−48.1)	−45.5 (−49.9)	−45.5 (−49.9)
Average precipitation mm (inches)	46.5 (1.83)	30.0 (1.18)	20.9 (0.82)	26.8 (1.06)	42.2 (1.66)	66.7 (2.63)	62.3 (2.45)	43.4 (1.71)	44.8 (1.76)	46.0 (1.81)	51.7 (2.04)	44.5 (1.75)	525.8 (20.70)
Average rainfall mm (inches)	5.3 (0.21)	5.9 (0.23)	5.2 (0.20)	19.3 (0.76)	41.3 (1.63)	66.7 (2.63)	62.3 (2.45)	43.4 (1.71)	44.3 (1.74)	36.4 (1.43)	14.2 (0.56)	2.7 (0.11)	346.8 (13.65)
Average snowfall cm (inches)	41.2 (16.2)	24.1 (9.5)	15.8 (6.2)	7.5 (3.0)	0.9 (0.4)	0.0 (0.0)	0.0 (0.0)	0.0 (0.0)	0.5 (0.2)	9.6 (3.8)	37.5 (14.8)	41.8 (16.5)	178.9 (70.4)
Average precipitation days (≥ 0.2 mm)	11.9	9.3	7.5	10.4	13.5	14.5	13.5	12.2	12.2	13.5	14.0	10.6	143.0
Average rainy days (≥ 0.2 mm)	2.2	2.6	3.0	7.7	13.2	14.5	13.5	12.2	12.1	11.9	4.7	1.4	98.9
Average snowy days (≥ 0.2 cm)	10.3	7.4	5.3	3.8	0.4	0.0	0.0	0.0	0.2	2.9	11.1	10.1	51.5

== Directions ==
Nearby communities of Fort Fraser include:

West on Hwy 16

- Fraser Lake - 21 km (13 mi)
- Burns Lake - 90 km (56 mi)
- Topley - 141 km (88 mi)
- Smithers - 234 km (145 mi)
- Terrace - 437 km (272 mi)
- Prince Rupert - 581 km (361 mi)

East on Hwy 16

- Vanderhoof - 38 km (24 mi)
- Fort St. James - 84 km (52 mi)
- Prince George - 134 km (83 mi)

== See also ==
- Last Spike (Grand Trunk Pacific Railway)
- Fort Fraser (sternwheeler)
