= Paarens Beach Provincial Park =

Provincial park in British Columbia, Canada

- IUCN category II (national park)
- Location within British Columbia
- Interactive map of Paarens Beach Provincial Park
- Location: British Columbia, Canada
- Nearest city: Fort St. James
- Coordinates: 54°25′06″N 124°22′53″W
- Area: 0.5 km^{2} (0.19 sq mi)
- Established: March 8, 1990
- Governing body: BC Parks

Paarens Beach Provincial Park is a provincial park in central British Columbia, Canada. It is located on the south-west shore of Stuart Lake, to the west of Fort St. James.

== History ==
Paarens Beach Provincial is set in the midst of a historic region. A short walk from the park is the Fort St. James National Historic Site, which is housed in the Fort St. James. It is a restored Hudson's Bay Company Post. The post commemorates the partnership between the fur traders and First Nations People.

== Sights ==
In the vicinity of the park is another historic building, Our Lady of Good Hope Church. Built in 1873, it is the third oldest church in the province. It closed in 1951, but there is a weekly mass in the summer months, which visitors can attend.

== Wildlife ==
The park's contrasting terrain and the different types of vegetation form rich habitats for species like moose, black bear, mule and white-tail deer, wolf, and grizzly bear. The park also has a healthy population of lynx, beaver, mink, marten, fisher, otter and wolverine.
