= Sowchea Bay Provincial Park =

Provincial park in British Columbia, Canada

- IUCN category II (national park)
- Location within British Columbia
- Interactive map of Sowchea Bay Provincial Park
- Location: British Columbia, Canada
- Nearest city: Fort St. James
- Coordinates: 54°25′11″N 124°27′00″W
- Area: 0.13 km^{2} (0.050 sq mi)
- Established: August 10, 1989
- Governing body: BC Parks

Sowchea Bay Provincial Park is a provincial park in central British Columbia, Canada. It is on Stuart Lake, west of Prince George. The park is 13 hectares (32 acres) in area. It is a busy destination for boaters and anglers, with a single-lane concrete boat launch available and limited parking.
