= 2026 Sundar Prize Film Festival =

2026 Canadian film festival

- Opening film: Saints and Warriors by Patrick Shannon
- Closing film: Mildlife by Cory Thibert
- Location: Delta and Surrey, British Columbia, Canada
- Founded: 23 December 2022; 3 years ago
- Founded by: Amar Sangha and Vinay Giridhar
- Hosted by: Sher Pride
- Festival date: April 23 to 26, 2026
- Website: sundarprize.com

Sundar Prize Film Festival
- 2027 2025

The 2026 Sundar Prize Film Festival was the third annual Sundar Prize Film Festival, held from April 23 to 26, 2026, in Delta and Surrey, British Columbia, Canada. Presented by Sher Pride, the festival's program was organized around the theme "Home Is Complicated, So Are We".

The festival opened at the North Delta Centre for the Arts with the screening block The Weight of Silence, The Power of Choice, which included Patrick Shannon's feature documentary Saints and Warriors, and closed at Landmark Cinemas Guildford with the screening block Choosing Each Other, which included Cory Thibert's feature film Mildlife.

Sidartha Murjani continued as the festival's executive director and senior programmer, a role he had held since the inaugural festival.

== Program ==
The 2026 festival was held across two venues, with programming on April 23 and 24 at the North Delta Centre for the Arts in Delta, and on April 25 and 26 at Landmark Cinemas Guildford in Surrey. The program included films exploring social justice and 2SLGBTQ+ experiences, alongside filmmaker question-and-answer sessions, panel discussions, receptions, a pitch session, and an awards ceremony.

== Jury ==
The festival listed separate Finalist Jury and Shortlist Jury groups for the 2026 edition.

=== Finalist Jury ===
- Carolyn Mauricette
- Greg Chan
- Sidartha Murjani
- Susan Ruzic

=== Shortlist Jury ===
- Akshay Sachdeva
- Amit Dhuga
- Charleen Phelps
- Dikshant Joshi
- Jane Diokpo
- King Louie Palomo
- Peter Lilly
- Valerie Raghoebier
- Rami Kahlon
- Rashi Sethi
- Shanthini Balasubramanian
- Siddharth Ganesh
- Swann Tsai
- Nic Altobelli

== Awards ==
The festival's award winners were announced on April 26, 2026, during an awards ceremony at Landmark Cinemas Guildford in Surrey.

| Award | Film | Director or recipient | Prize |
|---|---|---|---|
| Best Feature Film | Bayaan | Bikas Ranjan Mishra | $2,000 CAD |
| Best Short Film | One Day This Kid | Alexander Farah | $1,000 CAD |
| Best Feature Documentary | Saints and Warriors | Patrick Shannon | $2,000 CAD |
| Best Short Documentary | Light Through the Blindfold | Alireza Kazemipour | $1,000 CAD |
| Best Short Animation | Sing to the Wind | Yaffa Aboudib Husseini | $1,000 CAD |
| Best Environmental Film | The Fire in Our Hearts | Josias Tschanz | $1,000 CAD |
| Best 2SLGBTQ+ Film | If | Tathagata Ghosh | $2,000 CAD |
| Best Student Film | Praying for Love | Sofia Tonin | $500 CAD |
| Best Youth Film (19 and under) | Fallen | Angela Ruohan Yan | $500 CAD |
| Best British Columbia Feature Film | A Cree Approach | Tristin Greyeyes | $2,000 CAD |
| Best British Columbia Short Film | Red Light Rebel | Hannah Yang | $1,000 CAD |
| BC Student Film Showcase Award, First Prize | Home Is a Feeling | Ryah SM King | $1,000 CAD |
| BC Student Film Showcase Award, Second Prize | Through the Flow of Summer Snow | Sophia Santos English | $750 CAD |
| BC Student Film Showcase Award, Third Prize | Pan de Muerto | Renata Calderon | $500 CAD |
| Best Spiritual, Health, and Wellness Film | Et maintenant? (What Now?) | Jocelyn Forgues | $1,000 CAD |
| KDocsFF Best Emerging Filmmaker Residency Prize | Burcu's Angels | Özgün Gündüz | $1,000 CAD |
| The Performer's Mastery Award for Outstanding BC Performance | E for Effort, Never Excellence, Shitcute, and It's Not You | Medha Gautham | $500 CAD |

== Films ==
The films were organized into themed screening blocks across the festival's four days.

=== The Weight of Silence, The Power of Choice ===
This opening-night screening block was screened on April 23, 2026, at the North Delta Centre for the Arts.

| English title | Director(s) | Production country |
|---|---|---|
| Love Train | Tiegan Monaghan | Canada |
| Home Is a Feeling | Ryah SM King | Canada |
| One Day This Kid | Alexander Farah | Canada |
| Saints and Warriors | Patrick Shannon | Canada |

=== Small Stories, Big Questions ===
This BC Student and Youth Showcase screening block was screened on April 24, 2026, at the North Delta Centre for the Arts.

| English title | Director(s) | Production country |
|---|---|---|
| Grain | Ilana Zackon | Canada |
| E for Effort, Never Excellence | Sarah Shahab | Canada |
| Humanity Over Hate | Zara P. Bharadwaj | United States |
| Through the Flow of Summer Snow | Sophia Santos English | Canada |
| Fallen | Angela Ruohan Yan | United States |
| Black Chador | Elyana Moradi | Canada |
| Always Forever | Tibet Karayazgan | Canada |
| Drafting | Janshin Soo | Malaysia |
| Best Friends Notice of Deportation | Berenika Widera | Canada |
| All That Lies Beneath | Ella McCleary | Canada |
| Quenched | Ben Mark Hart Fieldhouse | Canada |

=== Who Are We Under Pressure? ===
This BC and Indigenous Spotlight screening block was screened on April 24, 2026, at the North Delta Centre for the Arts.

| English title | Director(s) | Production country |
|---|---|---|
| Knitty Gritty | Hannah Mangione | United States |
| The 2400 | David Scott Titus | Canada |
| Diamond Belly | Kyle D'Odorico | Canada |
| A Cree Approach | Tristin Greyeyes | Canada |

=== When Home Is on Fire ===
This Environmental Spotlight screening block was screened on April 24, 2026, at the North Delta Centre for the Arts.

| English title | Director(s) | Production country |
|---|---|---|
| Climate Crisis | Peter Cameron-Inglis | Canada |
| Embers | Trixie Pacis | Canada |
| The Fire in Our Hearts | Josias Tschanz | Canada |

=== What We Don't Say ===
This South Asian Spotlight screening block was screened on April 24, 2026, at the North Delta Centre for the Arts.

| English title | Director(s) | Production country |
|---|---|---|
| 18 to 35 | Rahul Chaturvedi | Canada |
| Shitcute | Ritisha Jhamb and Ry Fry | Canada |
| Sanjeevani | Neetha John | Canada |
| Calorie | Eisha Marjara | Canada, India |

=== Becoming Someone ===
This shorts screening block was screened on April 25, 2026, at Landmark Cinemas Guildford.

| English title | Original title | Director(s) | Production country |
|---|---|---|---|
| Pearl | | Alice Shin | Canada |
| Don't Think About the Pink Dolphins | | Anthony Lee | Canada |
| ripe | chín | Solara Thanh Bình Đặng | Vietnam, Canada |
| Art Connoisseur | | Hugh Liu | Canada |
| ENIGMA | | Anya Kapustianyk | Canada |
| Our Long Goodbye | | Dave Beamish | Canada |
| Praying for Love | | Sofia Tonin | United States |
| If | যদি | Tathagata Ghosh | India |
| Lateral | | Loken Charon | Canada |
| Sing to the Wind | | Yaffa Aboudib Husseini | Canada |
| Obscura | 옵스큐라 | Arnold Lim | Canada |

=== What We Inherit ===
This Centrepiece Spotlight screening block was screened on April 25, 2026, at Landmark Cinemas Guildford.

| English title | Director(s) | Production country |
|---|---|---|
| Sheepskin | Ethan Wingrove | Canada |
| Pan de Muerto | Renata Calderon | Canada |
| NEPO BABY | Khánh Nguyễn | Canada |
| Bayaan | Bikas Ranjan Mishra | India |

=== Crossing the Line ===
This shorts screening block was screened on April 25, 2026, at Landmark Cinemas Guildford.

| English title | Original title | Director(s) | Production country |
|---|---|---|---|
| Animals | | Michael Makaroff | Canada |
| Walk and Talk | | Inanna Cusi | Canada |
| Purgatory | | Nikki Shaffeeullah | Canada |
| Sheepskin | | Ethan Wingrove | Canada |
| At The End | | Lili Beaudoin and Isabelle Deluce | Canada |
| Trance | | Aman Mann | Canada |
| 113 Words For You Today | | Bo Qing Tang and Lan Zeng | China, Taiwan, United States |
| The Last Flight | | Amy Tsai and Brian Cheung | Canada |
| Vital | | Amir Zargara | Canada, Iran |
| Ambush | كمين | Yassmina Karajah | Canada, Jordan |

=== Love, Actually ===
This Queer Spotlight screening block was screened on April 25, 2026, at Landmark Cinemas Guildford.

| English title | Director(s) | Production country |
|---|---|---|
| Egg Yolk Custard Bun | Soya Wu | Canada |
| It's Not You | Tristan Garcia Ramos | Canada |
| Ramen Boys | Jason Sakaki | Canada |
| Blood Lines | Gail Maurice | Canada |

=== After Everything ===
This Spiritual, Health, and Wellness Spotlight screening block was screened on April 26, 2026, at Landmark Cinemas Guildford.

| English title | Original title | Director(s) | Production country |
|---|---|---|---|
| Surface | | Katherine Wong | Canada |
| A Ticket Home | | Magill Moyes | Canada |
| Light Through the Blindfold | | Alireza Kazemipour | Canada |
| What Now? | Et maintenant? | Jocelyn Forgues | Canada |

=== Choosing Each Other ===
This closing screening block was screened on April 26, 2026, at Landmark Cinemas Guildford.

| English title | Director(s) | Production country |
|---|---|---|
| Following The Line | Jia-Yee Ong | Taiwan |
| Red Light Rebel | Hannah Yang | Canada |
| Burcu's Angels | Özgün Gündüz | Canada |
| Mildlife | Cory Thibert | Canada |
