= 2025 Sundar Prize Film Festival =

2025 Canadian film festival

- Opening film: Paper Flowers by Mahesh Pailoor
- Closing film: Firma Aquí by Enrique Vázquez
- Location: Vancouver and Surrey, British Columbia, Canada
- Founded: 23 December 2022; 3 years ago
- Founded by: Amar Sangha and Vinay Giridhar
- Hosted by: Sher Vancouver
- Festival date: April 10 to 13, 2025
- Website: sundarprize.com

Sundar Prize Film Festival
- 2026 2024

The 2025 Sundar Prize Film Festival was the second annual Sundar Prize Film Festival, held from April 10 to 13, 2025, in Surrey, British Columbia, Canada. Presented by Sher Vancouver, the festival was themed "Life in Motion: Journeys of Growth and Discovery" and featured more than four dozen films at the Surrey campus of Simon Fraser University and Landmark Cinemas Guildford.

A pre-launch screening of Chrisann Hessing's documentary We Will Be Brave was co-presented with the Vancouver International Film Festival and Story Money Impact on April 9 at the VIFF Centre in Vancouver, ahead of the festival's official opening night.

The festival opened with the screening block Dreams & Petals: A Night of Enchantment, which paired Clara Chan's animated short Have I Swallowed Your Dreams with Mahesh Pailoor's feature film Paper Flowers, and closed with the screening block The Fragility of Forever, which paired Farnoosh Abedi Renani and Negah Khezre Fardiar Dad's animated short HOLY HEAVƎNESs with Enrique Vázquez's feature film Firma Aquí.

Sidartha Murjani continued as the festival's executive director and senior programmer, a role he had held since the inaugural festival.

== Program ==
The 2025 festival's official program ran from April 10 to 13, 2025, with opening night at the Surrey campus of Simon Fraser University on April 10 and the remaining public screenings at Landmark Cinemas Guildford from April 11 to 13. The program included feature films, shorts screening blocks, panel discussions, a networking reception, an open mic pitch session, and an awards presentation.

== Jury ==
The 2025 program guide listed finalist jurors and shortlist jurors for the festival. The Runner reported that Sidartha Murjani, Alex Sangha, and Vinay Giridhar were part of the finalist jury, which reviewed the top films selected by the shortlist jury.

=== Finalist Jury ===
- Alex Sangha
- Vinay Giridhar
- Susan Ruzic
- Sidartha Murjani
- Carolyn Mauricette
- Greg Chan

=== Shortlist Jury ===
- Akshay Sachdeva
- Nic Altobelli
- Rami Kahlon

== Awards ==
The 2025 edition expanded the festival's award categories ahead of its second annual event and the festival's award winners were announced on April 13, 2025, at Landmark Cinemas Guildford in Surrey, concluding the five-day run that began with the April 9 pre-launch screening.

Award	Film	Director or recipient	Prize
Best Feature Film	Firma Aquí	Enrique Vázquez	$2,500 CAD
Best Short Film	The Poem We Sang	Annie Sakab	$500 CAD
Rogers Group of Funds Best Canadian Documentary	Tea Creek	Ryan David Lee Dickie	$2,500 CAD
Knowledge Network Best International Documentary	This Is Who We Are	Peter Lilly	$1,000 CAD
Best Animation	Have I Swallowed Your Dreams	Clara Chan	$1,000 CAD
Best Environmental Film	Tea Creek	Ryan David Lee Dickie	$1,000 CAD
Best 2SLGBTQ+ Film	Leilani's Fortune	Loveleen Kaur	$1,000 CAD
Best Youth Film (19 and under)	LOOK	Georgia Tindle Acken	$500 CAD
Best Student Film	Desync	Minerva Marie Navasca	$500 CAD
Best British Columbia Feature Film	Mareya Shot Keetha Goal: Make the Shot	Baljit Sangra and Nilesh Patel	$1,000 CAD
Best British Columbia Short Film	Stand In	Hiromu Yamawaki	$500 CAD
KDocsFF Best Emerging Filmmaker Residency Prize	Velvet Secrets	Shanthini Balasubramanian	$1,000 CAD

== Films ==
=== Pre-launch screening ===
The festival held a soft pre-launch screening of We Will Be Brave, co-presented by the Vancouver International Film Festival and Story Money Impact, on April 9, 2025, at the VIFF Centre in Vancouver.

English title	Original title	Director(s)	Production country
We Will Be Brave		Chrisann Hessing	Canada

=== Dreams & Petals: A Night of Enchantment ===
This opening-night screening block was screened on April 10, 2025, at the Surrey campus of Simon Fraser University.

English title	Original title	Director(s)	Production country
Have I Swallowed Your Dreams		Clara Chan	Canada
Paper Flowers		Mahesh Pailoor	United States

=== Reclaiming Futures: A Call to Protect and Preserve ===
This screening block was screened on April 11, 2025, at Landmark Cinemas Guildford.

English title	Original title	Director(s)	Production country
Throwaway Living		Laura Malatos	United States
HA NII TOKXW: Our Food Table		Farhan Umedaly	Canada
The Stand		Christopher Auchter	Canada

=== Courage Unscripted: Moments of Fearless Authenticity ===
This shorts screening block was screened on April 11, 2025, at Landmark Cinemas Guildford.

English title	Original title	Director(s)	Production country
Different Kind of Sick		Nightingale	Canada
Lupe Q and the Galactic Corn Cake		Javier Badillo	Canada
Mannequin		Ramgopal Rajagopalan	Canada
Female and Furious		Siddharth Sanjay and Logan Ferino	Canada
Lifers		Ranjit Samra	Canada
Warmest Regards, E		Tina Nowarre and Shireen Dalbey	Canada
Beyond the Reins		Magill Moyes	Canada
Kids Are Only Kids Once		Alysha Collie and Dallas Yellowfly	Canada
Bubble Gum Ice Cream		Tegan Rane Dobrich and Huy Hoang	Canada
the eulogy.		Grace Chin	Canada
Jia		Vee Shi	Australia

=== Spirit and Resilience: A Vaisakhi Celebration ===
This screening block was screened on April 11, 2025, at Landmark Cinemas Guildford.

English title	Original title	Director(s)	Production country
Lullaby for Gulli		Dallas Sauer	Canada
Mareya Shot Keetha Goal: Make the Shot		Baljit Sangra and Nilesh Patel	Canada

=== The Human Mosaic: Dreams, Loss, and New Beginnings ===
This shorts screening block was screened on April 11, 2025, at Landmark Cinemas Guildford.

English title	Original title	Director(s)	Production country
A Summer's End Poem		Lam Can-zhao	China
New Blood		Ethan Wingrove	Canada
Jumpstart		Gur-Inder Singh and Harnoor Gill	Canada
Stand In		Hiromu Yamawaki	Canada
Out Beyond		Salman Alam Khan	United States
The Pringle Mingle		Jenny Lee-Gilmore	Canada
Close Shave		Marc Yungco	Canada
Mirthless		Tina Kardan	Canada
Choose The Correct Answer A, B, C or ...		Seung Yeon You	Canada
HATCH		Alireza Kazemipour and Panta Mosleh	Canada

=== Redefining Her Story ===
This screening block was screened on April 12, 2025, at Landmark Cinemas Guildford.

English title	Original title	Director(s)	Production country
Velvet Secrets		Shanthini Balasubramanian	Canada
Teresa's Choice		Marlene Castaños Ortega	Canada
Designed by Preeti		Gayatri Everitt Bajpai	United States

=== Rewriting Queer Representation ===
This screening block was screened on April 12, 2025, at Landmark Cinemas Guildford.

English title	Original title	Director(s)	Production country
My Roommate Ahriman		Nessa Aref	Canada
Bulletproof: A Lesbian's Guide to Surviving the Plot		Regan Latimer	Canada

=== Threads of Memory ===
This shorts screening block was screened on April 12, 2025, at Landmark Cinemas Guildford.

English title	Original title	Director(s)	Production country
Mirage		Jhanvi Motla	United States
Tehran Is Ours		Hamideh Azimi	United States
Bardo		Mishki Vaccaro	Canada
Desync		Minerva Marie Navasca	Canada
LOOK		Georgia Tindle Acken	Canada
A Simple Ask		Nadya Naumaan	United States
Conviction		Bruce Thomas Miller	Canada
Whispers of Colors		Sujin Kim	United States
FLIGHT 182		Rippin Sindher	United States

=== Harvesting Hope: Food as Healing and Activism ===
This screening block was screened on April 13, 2025, at Landmark Cinemas Guildford.

English title	Original title	Director(s)	Production country
A Nation's Table		Garrett Smith	Canada
Tea Creek		Ryan David Lee Dickie	Canada

=== Unseen Palestine ===
This screening block was screened on April 13, 2025, at Landmark Cinemas Guildford.

English title	Original title	Director(s)	Production country
My Homeland	Mawtini	Fateema Al-Hamaydeh Miller	Canada
The Poem We Sang		Annie Sakab	Canada, Jordan, Palestine
This Is Who We Are		Peter Lilly	United Kingdom

=== Life in Full Colour: Celebrating Queer Triumphs ===
This screening block was screened on April 13, 2025, at Landmark Cinemas Guildford.

English title	Original title	Director(s)	Production country
Body Varial		Audrey Kerridge	Canada
Canyon Chorus		Chris Cresci	United States
Leilani's Fortune		Loveleen Kaur	Canada

=== The Fragility of Forever ===
This closing-night screening block was screened on April 13, 2025, at Landmark Cinemas Guildford.

English title	Original title	Director(s)	Production country
HOLY HEAVƎNESs		Farnoosh Abedi Renani and Negah Khezre Fardiar Dad	Iran
Sign Here	Firma Aquí	Enrique Vázquez	Mexico
