= 2024 Sundar Prize Film Festival =

2024 Canadian film festival

- Opening film: Unstoppable Beat by Luke Dye-Montefiore and Rufus Dye-Montefiore
- Closing film: Rosie by Gail Maurice
- Location: Surrey, British Columbia, Canada
- Founded: 23 December 2022; 3 years ago
- Founded by: Amar Sangha and Vinay Giridhar
- Hosted by: Sher Vancouver
- No. of films: 9 films
- Festival date: June 15 to 16, 2024
- Website: sundarprize.com

Sundar Prize Film Festival
- 2025

The 2024 Sundar Prize Film Festival was the inaugural Sundar Prize Film Festival, held from June 15 to 16, 2024, at Centre Stage at Surrey City Hall in Surrey, British Columbia, Canada. Presented by Sher Vancouver, the festival's theme was "Celebrating Human Resilience".

Unlike later editions, the inaugural festival screened only the nine award-winning films. The festival announced its finalists on March 1, 2024, and announced the award winners on April 2, 2024, ahead of the June in-person screenings. Reporting on the festival noted that the nine winning films were selected from 228 submissions and were screened across four screening blocks at Surrey City Hall. The program included red carpet interviews, panel discussions, opening remarks, receptions, and presentations of awards to attending filmmakers during the festival screenings.

Sidartha Murjani served as the festival's Executive Director and Senior Programmer for the inaugural edition.

== Program ==
The festival was held over two days at Centre Stage at Surrey City Hall. The program was organized into four screening blocks, each built around the festival's nine award-winning films and accompanying panel discussions.

== Jury ==
The 2024 program guide listed jury members for the inaugural festival.

=== Finalist Jury ===
- Alex Sangha
- Vinay Giridhar
- Susan Ruzic
- Sidartha Murjani
- Greg Chan

=== Shortlist Jury ===
- Rami Kahlon
- Nic Altobelli

== Awards ==
The winners were announced on April 2, 2024. The 2024 edition presented cash prizes across nine categories, including sponsored awards from the Rogers Group of Funds and KDocsFF.

Award	Film	Director or recipient	Prize
Best Feature Film	Rosie	Gail Maurice	$5,000 CAD
Rogers Group of Funds Best Canadian Documentary	Eternal Spring	Jason Loftus	$2,500 CAD
Best International Documentary	Swallow Flying to the South	Mochi Lin	$2,500 CAD
Best British Columbia Film	Dil Rakh: Gloves of Kin	Dalj Brar	$1,500 CAD
Best Short Film	A Good Day Will Come	Amir Zargara	$1,500 CAD
Best Environmental Film	Rematriation	Alexi Liotti	$1,500 CAD
Best Animation	Unstoppable Beat	Luke Dye-Montefiore and Rufus Dye-Montefiore	$1,000 CAD
Best Student Film	DOSH	Radha Mehta	$500 CAD
KDocsFF Best Emerging Filmmaker Residency Prize	Cash Cows	Shubham Chhabra	$1,000 CAD

Following the inaugural edition, the festival expanded its award categories for the 2025 festival.

== Films ==
The 2024 festival screened the nine award-winning films over four screening blocks.

=== Building Empathy through Film: Fostering Understanding and Connection ===
This opening screening block was screened on June 15, 2024, at Centre Stage at Surrey City Hall.

English title	Original title	Director(s)	Production country
Unstoppable Beat		Luke Dye-Montefiore and Rufus Dye-Montefiore	United Kingdom
Dil Rakh: Gloves of Kin		Dalj Brar	Canada

=== Empowerment through Art: The Resilience of Creative Expression ===
This screening block was screened on June 15, 2024, at Centre Stage at Surrey City Hall.

English title	Original title	Director(s)	Production country
Cash Cows		Shubham Chhabra	Canada
Eternal Spring		Jason Loftus	Canada

=== Hope in Times of Crisis: Finding Resilience Amidst Adversity ===
This screening block was screened on June 16, 2024, at Centre Stage at Surrey City Hall.

English title	Original title	Director(s)	Production country
A Good Day Will Come		Amir Zargara	Canada
Swallow Flying to the South		Mochi Lin	United States
Rematriation		Alexi Liotti	Canada

=== Celebrating Human Resilience: How do we build genuinely strong communities? ===
This closing screening block was screened on June 16, 2024, at Centre Stage at Surrey City Hall.

English title	Original title	Director(s)	Production country
DOSH		Radha Mehta	United States
Rosie		Gail Maurice	Canada
