= Sundar Prize Film Festival =

Annual film festival in Surrey, British Columbia

- Location: Surrey, British Columbia, Canada
- Founded: 23 December 2022; 3 years ago
- Founded by: Amar Sangha and Vinay Giridhar
- Most recent: 2026
- Hosted by: Sher Pride
- Festival date: April 23 to 26, 2026
- Language: International
- Website: sundarprize.com

Current: 2026
- 2027 2025

The Sundar Prize Film Festival is an annual film festival in Surrey, British Columbia, Canada. Founded in 2022 by Amar Sangha and Vinay Giridhar, the festival presents films focused on social impact and underrepresented perspectives. According to the festival's official website, it is an IMDb-qualifying festival.

The festival's programming has included narrative, documentary, animation, student, and British Columbia film categories, as well as panel discussions and networking events.

As of 2026, Sidartha Murjani, serves as the festival's Executive Director and Senior Programmer.

== History ==
The Sundar Prize Film Festival was announced in 2023 as a new Surrey-based film festival and prize program organized through Sher Vancouver, now Sher Pride. Early coverage described the event as a new international film competition intended to bring socially impactful films to Surrey.

The inaugural edition took place on June 15 and 16, 2024, in Surrey City Hall. Coverage of the first festival highlighted its theme of "celebrating human resilience" with films such as Rosie and Eternal Spring, and its emphasis on socially engaged filmmaking and underrepresented voices.

The second edition was held in April 2025 and expanded to multiple venues, including Simon Fraser University Surrey and Landmark Cinemas Guildford. Reporting on the 2025 event described it as a multi-day festival with screenings, discussions, and an awards presentation.

The festival's third annual edition was held from April 23 to 26, 2026, with programming at the North Delta Centre for the Arts in Delta and Landmark Cinemas Guildford in Surrey. The 2026 festival was themed "Home Is Complicated, So Are We" and included screenings, panel discussions, filmmaker question-and-answer sessions, receptions, a pitch session, and an awards ceremony. Coverage of the 2026 edition highlighted films including Saints and Warriors, One Day This Kid, ripe, Ambush, Blood Lines, Calorie, Bayaan, and The Fire in Our Hearts.

== Programming ==
The festival focuses on films addressing social issues and communities including human rights, migration, social justice, environmental concerns, and marginalized groups. Coverage of the inaugural edition noted a lineup of films from Canada and other countries alongside panel discussions and networking receptions.

In 2025, festival coverage reported increased Canadian and British Columbia representation in the lineup, including documentary, narrative, and short film programming. Articles on the 2025 edition also highlighted the event's emphasis on women directors, BIPOC filmmakers, and queer representation.

== Awards ==
The festival presents juried awards in multiple categories. The inaugural festival presented cash prizes for categories including feature films, documentary, short film, animation, and student film.

For the 2025 and 2026 edition, the festival expanded and revised several award categories, including separate feature and short documentary awards, a short animation award, a Spiritual, Health, and Wellness category, a BC Student Film Showcase, The Performer's Mastery Award for Outstanding BC Performance, and the introduction of the BC Youth Storyteller's Contest.

According to the festival's FilmFreeway listing, the 2027 edition is scheduled to present the following juried awards and cash prizes:

Award	Prize
Best Feature Film (Narrative Live Action)	$1,000 CAD
Best Short Film (Narrative Live Action)	$500 CAD
Best Feature Documentary	$1,000 CAD
Best Short Documentary	$500 CAD
Best Short Animation	$500 CAD
Best Environmental Film	$500 CAD
Best Spiritual, Health, and Wellness Film	$500 CAD
Best 2SLGBTQ+ Film	$1,000 CAD
Best Youth Film (19 and under)	$300 CAD
Best Student Film	$300 CAD
Best British Columbia Feature Film	$1,000 CAD
Best British Columbia Short Film	$500 CAD
BC Student Film Showcase	$750 CAD, $500 CAD, and $300 CAD
Best Emerging Filmmaker Residency Prize sponsored by KDocsFF	$1,000 CAD

Based on the festival's FilmFreeway listing, the nominees and award-winning films are expected to be announced at the closing ceremony on the last day of the festival, which for the 2027 edition would be April 25, 2027.

== Venues ==
The inaugural 2024 edition was held at Surrey City Hall. By 2025, the festival had expanded to Simon Fraser University Surrey and Landmark Cinemas Guildford. The 2026 edition was held across two venues, with programming on April 23 and 24 at the North Delta Centre for the Arts in Delta, and programming on April 25 and 26 at Landmark Cinemas Guildford in Surrey.

FilmFreeway lists the 2027 festival as returning to Landmark Cinemas Guildford in Surrey and the North Delta Centre for the Arts in Delta, although specific day-by-day programming by venue had not yet been announced.

== See also ==
- List of film festivals in Canada
