= Sher Pride =

LGBTQ South Asian charity in Vancouver

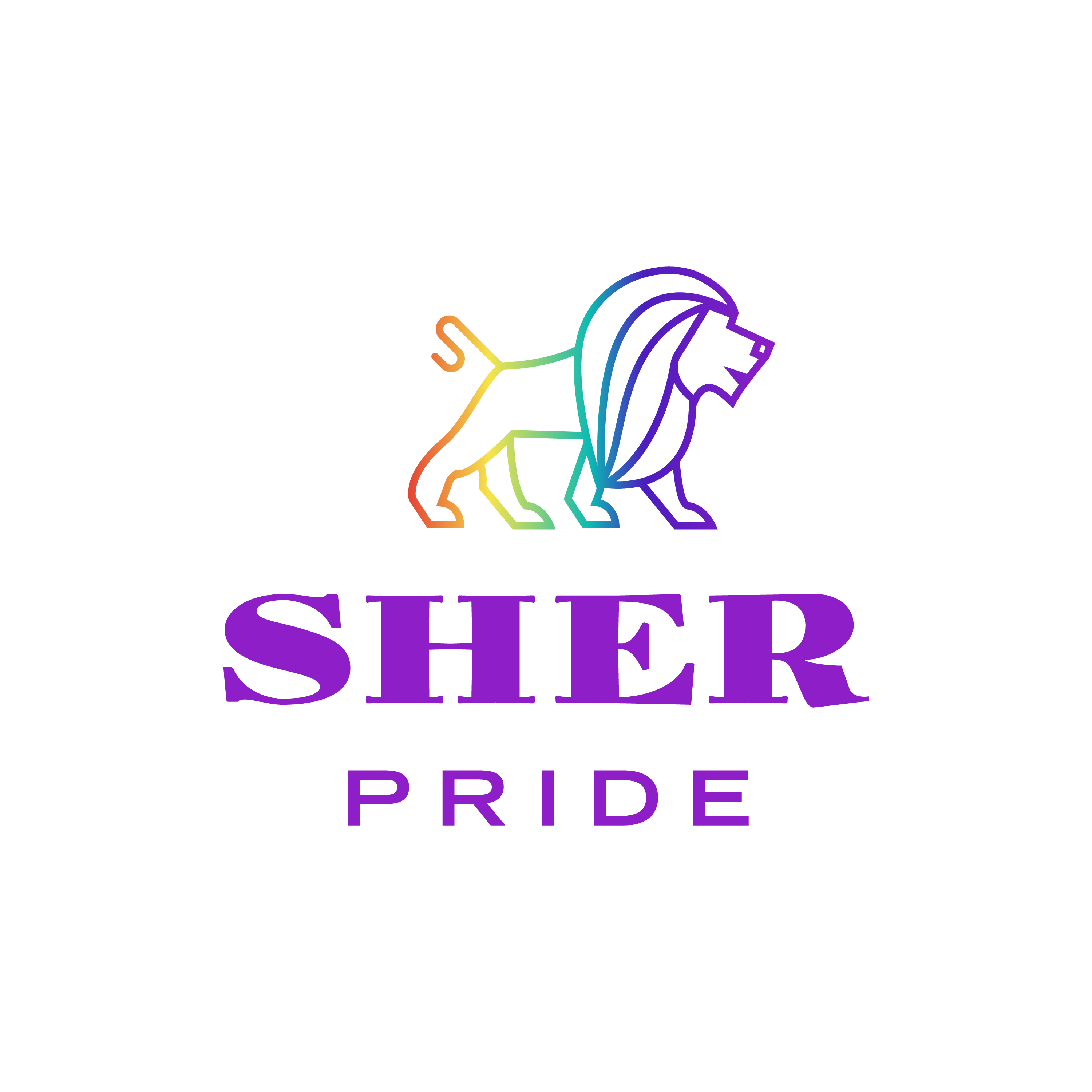
- Founded: April 6, 2008; 18 years ago in Delta, British Columbia, Canada.
- Founder: Amar Sangha
- Headquarters: Surrey, British Columbia, Canada.
- Area served: Metro Vancouver, British Columbia
- Website: sherpride.ca

Sher Pride, registered as Sher Vancouver LGBTQ Friends Society and formerly known as Sher Vancouver, is a registered charity in Metro Vancouver, British Columbia, Canada. The organization provides arts, cultural, and social service programmes for LGBTQ South Asians, as well as their friends, families, and allies.

Its activities have included peer support groups, counselling support, crisis assistance, educational outreach, bullying prevention, anti racism initiatives, social justice film production, community resources, public education, and the Sundar Prize Film Festival.

== History ==
Sher Pride was originally founded in April 2008 as Sher Vancouver by social worker Amar Sangha as an online Yahoo group after he identified a need for culturally specific support for LGBTQIA+ Sikhs in the Lower Mainland.

The word "sher" means "lion" in Persian and many South Asian languages. The name was chosen to reflect strength, courage, pride, and bravery.

The original Sher Vancouver logo, which was used from 2008 to 2018, consisted of a pink circular lionhead on a white background, with Sher in bold pink letters and Vancouver in grey. It was created by Vancouver graphic designer and illustrator Jag Nagra. In April 2018, as Sher Vancouver marked its tenth anniversary, Nagra completed a rebrand of the organization's visual identity using a two colour logo and updated icon.

Although the group began with a Sikh focus, it later expanded to include South Asian LGBTQ people more broadly, along with friends, families, and allies. By 2011, Sher Vancouver had grown into a wider social and support organization serving LGBTQ South Asians in Metro Vancouver, with activities that included community support, public education, and school outreach.

In April 2009, the organization launched the Dosti Project, an educational outreach initiative in which South Asian speakers delivered school workshops about coming out and LGBTQ inclusion. The word dosti means friendship in several South Asian languages.

Over the years, the organization became visible through Pride events, South Asian cultural events, public education, media interviews, and community programming. In 2016, Sangha was named the first Sikh grand marshal of the Vancouver Pride Parade. In 2017, Sher Vancouver members and allies participated in the Vancouver Vaisakhi Parade, which was reported as a historic appearance for an LGBTQ South Asian group in the event.

In 2018, Sher Vancouver marked its tenth anniversary with Desi-Q, a community celebration in Surrey. The Georgia Straight reported that the tenth anniversary event was among several milestones for the organization that year, and that the event was connected to the later development of a counselling support initiative.

The organization later adopted Sher Pride as its public operating name while retaining the legal name Sher Vancouver LGBTQ Friends Society. The name change took effect in 2026 and reflected the organization's broader growth while maintaining continuity with its South Asian LGBTQ roots.

== Programs and services ==
Sher Pride provides social services, peer support, educational outreach, arts and cultural programming, and community development initiatives for LGBTQ South Asians and other marginalized community members. CanadaHelps lists the organization's programmes as including counselling, crisis support, youth leadership, peer support groups, intake, information and referral, student practicum and mentorship opportunities, school screenings, social justice community film production, educational resources, outreach workshops, community outreach, volunteer programming, and the Sundar Prize Film Festival.

The organization has operated peer support programming for LGBTQ South Asians, including youth, women, adults, and friends. In 2017, The Georgia Straight reported that Sher Vancouver was launching a monthly Surrey peer support group for South Asian youth who identified as LGBT, queer, or questioning, after the organization received inquiries from youth and families following its participation in local Vaisakhi events. In 2023, CityNews Vancouver reported on Pyar Is Pyar, a Sher Vancouver support group for South Asians who identify as LGBTQ and may not feel accepted by family or community members. The report described the group as a space intended to reduce isolation and stigma, with meetings that included discussions of sexual health, healthy relationships, safe spaces, art, and community connection.

In 2021, Sher Vancouver released Destination YVR, a free survival guide for queer newcomers, refugees, refugees claimants, asylum seekers, and students in Metro Vancouver.

Sher Pride has also periodically released a list of South Asian role models. In 2025, Pancouver reported that Sher Vancouver's Top 15 list recognized South Asian artists, activists, athletes, astronauts, musicians, broadcasters, politicians, and other changemakers from South Asian countries and diasporic communities.

== Out and Proud Project ==
In 2013, Sher Pride launched the Out and Proud Project, which profiled LGBTQ South Asians from around the world.

== Sher Vancouver Podcast ==
Sher Pride also produced the Sher Vancouver Podcast, which was active from 2021 to 2024 and released 30 episodes. The podcast described itself as a space for BIPOC 2SLGBTQ+ individuals and allies, and was hosted by Sharon and Niri, two queer South Asian women. In 2023, CBC News reported that Sharon created the podcast after seeking out stories of queer South Asian women in British Columbia, and described the podcast as telling the stories of men, women, and non-binary members of the local LGBTQ+ community. Teacher Magazine also profiled the podcast as a platform highlighting queer and trans BIPOC stories, including episodes featuring educator Annie Ohana and student advocate Finn Liu. TEDxSurrey also reported that Liu appeared on the podcast to discuss his TEDx experience and trans inclusion within Asian communities.

== January Marie Lapuz ==
January Marie Lapuz, born John Carlo Embo Lapuz, April 9, 1986 to September 30, 2012, was the social coordinator of Sher Pride and was the first transgender person to become an executive member of the organization.

She died of multiple stab wounds in New Westminster, British Columbia, due to an altercation with a client over the price of a sexual encounter. Sher Pride wrote to the City of New Westminster advocating for a memorial for January Marie Lapuz.

== January Award ==
In 2015, Sher Pride launched the January Marie Lapuz Youth Leadership Award to recognize youth aged 16 to 30 who demonstrate involvement, commitment, and leadership in the LGBTQ community. Social activist Jaspreet Chahal of Surrey, British Columbia, was the inaugural winner in 2015, and South Asian LGBTQ magazine founder Sukhdeep Singh of India was the winner in 2016. Social activists Prachi Khanna and Shilpa Narayan, both of Surrey, were the winners in 2017 and 2018, respectively. Transgender Lebanese journalist and activist Norma Lize of Vancouver was the winner in 2019. Christopher Nkambwe, who founded the African Centre for Refugees in Ontario, was the winner in 2020. In 2021, community developer Crecien Bencio of Vancouver became the first Filipino to win the award.

The award was officially rebranded as the January Award in 2025 to mark its 10th year.

The award winners include:

Year	Winner
2015	Jaspreet Singh Chahal
2016	Sukhdeep Singh
2017	Prachi Khanna
2018	Shilpa Narayan
2019	Norma Lize
2020	Christopher Nkambwe
2021	Crecien Bencio
2022	Sophia M. Matthew
2023	Lina Tharcilla Irutavyose and Sydney Brouillard-Coyle
2024	Andy Holmes
2025	Graham Robertson

== Documentaries ==
Sher Pride's film and media work has included documentary projects focused on marginalized communities, LGBTQ experiences, identity, family acceptance, public education, and community advocacy.

=== My Name Was January ===
In 2018, Sher Pride released the short documentary film My Name Was January, a tribute to January Marie Lapuz that provided a platform for trans women of colour to discuss their issues, challenges, and strengths. The film was an official selection at the National Screen Institute Online Short Film Festival in Winnipeg, Manitoba, and the San Francisco Bay Area Sex Worker Film and Arts Festival. It also won Best Short Documentary at the Emerging Lens Cultural Film Festival in Halifax and was recognized at the Vancouver International South Asian Film Festival; both festivals are listed by the Academy of Canadian Cinema & Television as qualifying festivals for the Canadian Screen Awards. The documentary has won 14 international awards and received 66 official selections at film festivals around the world. The film was produced by Sher Pride founder Amar Sangha and Sher Pride president Ash Brar and directed by former Kwantlen Polytechnic University journalism students Elina Gress and Lenee Son. My Name Was January stars January's mother, Betty Lapuz, and her friends Ash Brar, Amar Sangha, Josh Soronow, Pam Hayer, and Velvet Steele, as well as social activists Kelendria Nation and Natasha Adsit. There is rare footage of January Marie Lapuz herself.

=== Emergence: Out of the Shadows ===
In September 2021, Sher Pride released its debut feature-length documentary, Emergence: Out of the Shadows, about the strengths and struggles of gay and lesbian South Asian people and the reactions of their parents. The film was produced by Amar Sangha and directed by Vinay Giridhar, and stars Amar Sangha, Jaspal Kaur Sangha, Kayden Bhangu, Jag Nagra, Harv Nagra, Avtar Singh Nagra, and Rajwant Kaur Nagra.

The film had its world premiere at Cinema Diverse: The Palm Springs LGBTQ Film Festival, where it won a Festival Favourite award. It subsequently screened at festivals including Frameline in San Francisco, a BAFTA-qualifying festival; Out On Film in Atlanta, an Academy Award qualifying festival; the Chicago South Asian Film Festival, where Giridhar received a Special Mention for Best Feature Documentary; Tasveer South Asian Film Festival in Seattle; Kashish Mumbai International Queer Film Festival in Mumbai; and the Mumbai International Film Festival.

Emergence: Out of the Shadows was also an official selection at image+nation LGBTQueer Montréal, Reelworld Film Festival in Toronto, NorthwestFest in Edmonton, and the Vancouver Queer Film Festival. It was the closing night film at both the South Asian Film Festival of Montreal and the Vancouver International South Asian Film Festival, where it won Best Documentary.

Six Canadian festivals at which the film screened are listed by the Academy of Canadian Cinema & Television as qualifying festivals for the Canadian Screen Awards: the Vancouver Asian Film Festival, Vancouver International South Asian Film Festival, Reelworld Film Festival, NorthwestFest, the Vancouver Queer Film Festival, and image+nation LGBTQueer Montréal.

The film was nominated for three awards at the Vancouver Asian Film Festival, including Best Canadian Feature Award, Best Director for Canadian Feature Award, and Best Cinematography for Canadian Feature Award for 2021. Emergence: Out of the Shadows entered the Canadian Screen Awards for Best Feature Documentary and Best Editing for 2022. The film had its South Asian premiere at Reel Desires: Chennai International Queer Film Festival.

Emergence: Out of the Shadows was later featured as a digital exhibit by the South Asian Canadian Digital Archive, an initiative of the South Asian Studies Institute at the University of the Fraser Valley.

== Sundar Prize Film Festival ==
Sher Pride presents the Sundar Prize Film Festival, an annual film festival in Surrey, British Columbia, focused on films about social causes, social issues, and underrepresented perspectives. The festival was co-founded by Amar Sangha and Vinay Giridhar. Vancouver Film School reported in 2024 that Sidartha Murjani, a VFS alumnus, served as the festival's Executive Director and Senior Programmer. Announced in 2023 under the organization's former name, Sher Vancouver, the festival was described in early coverage as an international film awards competition for films with social impact. Stir described the festival as an extension of Sher Pride's earlier documentary work, including My Name Was January and Emergence: Out of the Shadows.

The inaugural festival was held on June 15 and 16, 2024, at Centre Stage at Surrey City Hall, with the theme "celebrating human resilience". Its programming has included Canadian and international films, juried awards, cash prizes, panel discussions, and networking events. In 2026, the festival expanded to include screenings in both Surrey and North Delta. Surrey Now-Leader reported that the 2026 festival included 62 films selected from 823 submissions.

The festival has also operated filmmaker development programmes, including a mentorship program for emerging filmmakers in British Columbia and Canada. Its FilmFreeway profile identifies the Sundar Prize Film Festival as an IMDb qualifying festival, a member of the Film Festival Alliance, and an initiative of Sher Pride.

== Awards ==
Sher Pride received an award from New West Pride for being "Organization of the Year" for establishing the January Marie Lapuz Youth Leadership Award.

In May 2026, Sher Pride received the Community Impact Award from KPU, which recognizes individuals and organizations that are strong partners of KPU and are making a difference in regional communities.

Founder Amar Sangha received the Meritorious Service Medal in the Civil Division of the Meritorious Service Decorations. The Governor General of Canada's official honours database states that the medal was awarded on October 17, 2017 and invested on March 25, 2019, and recognized Sangha for founding Sher Vancouver as a cultural and support group for LGBTQ South Asians, their friends, and their families.

== See also ==
- LGBTQ culture in Vancouver
- South Asian Canadians
- Indo-Canadians in British Columbia
- LGBTQ rights in Canada
- Sundar Prize Film Festival
- Amar Sangha
