= Vinay Giridhar =

Indian-born filmmaker, animator, editor, and visual artist

- Born: Kerala, India
- Education: Vancouver Film School
- Occupations: Filmmaker; animator; editor; visual artist; graphic designer
- Known for: Emergence: Out of the Shadows; Sundar Prize Film Festival
- Website: vinaygiridhar.ca

Vinay Giridhar is an Indian-born filmmaker, animator, editor, visual artist, and graphic designer based in Surrey and Vancouver, British Columbia. He is best known as the director and editor of the feature documentary Emergence: Out of the Shadows, which focuses on LGBTQ+ South Asians in Metro Vancouver, and as a co-founder of the Sundar Prize Film Festival.

Giridhar is also the director of the upcoming documentary feature I, Migrant, a Goodness Pictures project about immigration from India to Canada that has received development and production support from Creative BC.

== Early life, education, and career ==
Giridhar was born and raised in Kerala, India, studying animation and graphic design in India before moving to Canada to attend Vancouver Film School's Classical Animation program.

His Vancouver Film School graduation film, Love's Age, received school recognition and screened at festivals including the National Film Festival for Talented Youth and the HollyShorts Film Festival. He later studied digital graphic design at Vancouver Community College.

Giridhar has also been involved with community and social-impact media projects connected to Sher Vancouver, later known as Sher Pride.

== Emergence: Out of the Shadows ==
Giridhar made his feature documentary directorial debut with Emergence: Out of the Shadows, a Canadian documentary about LGBTQ+ South Asians in Metro Vancouver. The film was produced by Amar Sangha and directed and edited by Giridhar. It stars Amar Sangha, Jaspal Kaur Sangha, Kayden Bhangu, Jag Nagra, Harv Nagra, Avtar Singh Nagra, and Rajwant Kaur Nagra. The documentary followed queer South Asians as they discussed coming out, family acceptance, cultural identity, and the experiences of parents responding to their children's sexuality. It examined themes including isolation, family expectations, intersectional identities, and the personal impact of living openly. Giridhar said the documentary was intended to create safer spaces for LGBTQ+ children and youth seeking acceptance from friends and loved ones.

Emergence: Out of the Shadows had its world premiere at Cinema Diverse: The Palm Springs LGBTQ Film Festival, where it won a Festival Favourite award. It subsequently screened at several Academy of Canadian Cinema & Television and Canadian Screen Awards qualifying festivals including the Vancouver Asian Film Festival, Reelworld Film Festival in Toronto, NorthwestFest in Edmonton, the Vancouver Queer Film Festival, image+nation LGBTQueer Montréal, Out On Film in Atlanta, the Chicago South Asian Film Festival, Frameline in San Francisco, KASHISH Mumbai International Queer Film Festival, and the Mumbai International Film Festival.

The film was the closing night film at both the South Asian Film Festival of Montreal and the 2021 Vancouver International South Asian Film Festival, where it won Best Documentary. It was nominated for three awards at the Vancouver Asian Film Festival, including Best Canadian Feature Award, Best Director for Canadian Feature Award, and Best Cinematography for Canadian Feature Award for 2021. It also entered the Canadian Screen Awards for Best Feature Documentary and Best Editing for 2022.

Emergence: Out of the Shadows had its South Asian premiere at Reel Desires: Chennai International Queer Film Festival. It also had a double festival premiere at the KASHISH Mumbai International Queer Film Festival and the Mumbai International Film Festival during the same week, where it was in competition at both festivals for Best Documentary. The film also had an in-person and online screening at the 46th annual Frameline: San Francisco International LGBTQ+ Film Festival. It also received the Flame Award at the 2022 U.K. Asian Film Festival, won a Festival Favourite award at Cinema Diverse, and earned Giridhar a Special Mention for Best Feature Documentary at the Chicago South Asian Film Festival. In October 2023, the film also received the Best Feature Film award at the inaugural Langley City Film Festival.

In addition to its film festival run, the film was broadcast in Canada on Knowledge Network, TVO, and OUTtv.. Additionally, the film had more than 50 community screenings, including at the University of British Columbia, Simon Fraser University, University of the Fraser Valley, and Douglas College. It was later also screened by KDocsFF at Kwantlen Polytechnic University and had become part of the South Asian Canadian Digital Archive at the University of the Fraser Valley's South Asian Studies Institute.

== Sundar Prize Film Festival ==
Giridhar co-founded the Sundar Prize Film Festival with Amar Sangha. The festival is based in Surrey, British Columbia, and focuses on films connected to social causes, public issues, social justice, social change, and underrepresented perspectives.

The inaugural Sundar Prize Film Festival took place in June 2024 at Surrey City Hall and included screenings, panel discussions, awards, and a Kwantlen Polytechnic University-based residency prize. In 2025, Giridhar was also a mentor in the festival's filmmaker mentorship program for emerging filmmakers in Canada.

== I, Migrant ==
Giridhar is the director and co-producer of the documentary feature I, Migrant, a project exploring Indian immigrants pursuing a new life in Canada.

In 2025, Creative BC announced that I, Migrant was among the projects supported through its Equity and Emerging Development Program, and later that year also announced production financing for I, Migrant, listing Goodness Pictures Ltd. as the production company.

== Filmography ==
Love's Age
Animated short film. Giridhar's Vancouver Film School graduation film.

Emergence: Out of the Shadows (2021)
Feature documentary. Director and editor.

I, Migrant
Feature documentary. In production. Director and co-producer.
