= Alexander Farah =

Canadian film director and editor

Alexander Farah is a Canadian film director and editor from Vancouver, British Columbia. He is most noted for his 2024 short film One Day This Kid, which was named to the Toronto International Film Festival's annual Canada's Top Ten list for 2024.

Drawn to film after taking a film studies course while studying sciences at the University of British Columbia, he subsequently pursued full film studies at Emily Carr University of Art and Design and York University. He released his first short film, Sahar, in 2014, which premiered at the 2014 Toronto International Film Festival.

He has worked as an editor in film and television, with credits including Bad Omen (2020), Soft (2022), Lay Me by the Shore (2022) and Motherland (2023). He has also directed and edited music videos for artists including Jordan Klassen, Austra and Desirée Dawson, winning both the Music Video Competition Grand Jury Award and Audience Choice Award at SXSW in 2022 for Dawson's "Meet You at the Light".

One Day This Kid, centred on a young Afghan Canadian boy coming to terms with his sexuality, was inspired by Farah's own experiences.
