= One Day This Kid =

2024 Canadian short film directed by Alexandre Farah

- Film poster
- Directed by: Alexander Farah
- Written by: Alexander Farah
- Produced by: Joaquin Cardoner
- Starring: Elyas Rahimi; Mahan Mohammadinasab; Massey Ahmar
- Cinematography: Farhad Ghaderi
- Edited by: Alexander Farah
- Music by: Cyrus Reynolds
- Production companies: Boldly; Nimruz; Section 80; Wallop Film
- Release date: September 6, 2024 (TIFF)
- Running time: 18 minutes
- Country: Canada
- Languages: English; Dari / Persian

One Day This Kid is a 2024 Canadian short drama film, written and directed by Alexander Farah and released in 2024. Inspired by David Wojnarowicz's artwork Untitled (One Day This Kid...), the film centres on Hamed (Elyas Rahimi), a young Afghan Canadian boy who is struggling to come to terms with being gay against the disapproval of his immigrant parents.

The cast also includes Massey Ahmar, Phil Boutros, Justin Cardas, Navid Charkhi, Ashaan Dhillon, Ben Drysdale, Massoud Hashmi, Roohafza Hazrat, Maestro Porus Irani, Shadi Janho, Yuvraj Kalsi, Aydin Malekooti, Mahan Mohammadinasab, Tahera Rahimi, Mostafa Shaker, Panthea Vatandoost and Areen Yadav in supporting roles.

The film premiered at the 2024 Toronto International Film Festival. It was later screened at the Chilliwack Independent Film Festival, where it won the award for best live action short film.

The film was named to TIFF's annual Canada's Top Ten list for 2024. It was later screened at the 2025 South by Southwest film festival, where it won the Narrative Short award. That year, the film also won the Iris Prize. It also won the award for Best Short Film at the 2026 Sundar Prize Film Festival.
