= Rosie (2022 film) =

2022 Canadian film by Gail Maurice

- Directed by: Gail Maurice
- Written by: Gail Maurice
- Produced by: Gail Maurice; Jamie Manning
- Starring: Keris Hope Hill; Melanie Bray; Constant Bernard; Alex Trahan
- Cinematography: Celiana Cárdenas
- Edited by: Shaun Rykiss
- Production companies: Assini Productions; Night Market
- Distributed by: Photon Films
- Release date: September 9, 2022 (TIFF)
- Running time: 92 minutes
- Country: Canada
- Languages: English; French; Cree

Rosie is a 2022 Canadian comedy-drama film, written, produced, and directed by Gail Maurice. Maurice's feature directorial debut and an expansion of her 2018 short film of the same name, the film centres on Rosie (Keris Hope Hill), a young First Nations girl who is sent to live with her aunt Frédérique (Melanie Bray) in Montreal after her mother's death, and learns the value of rebuilding chosen family from Fred and her two-spirit friends Flo (Constant Bernard) and Mo (Alex Trahan).

The cast also includes Josée Young, Brandon Oakes, Jocelyne Zucco, Arlen Aguayo-Stewart, Jean Pearson, Tony De Santis, Xavier Yuvens, Pierre Simpson, Ron Lea, Domenico Fiore, Joseph Claude Dubois, Mike Ross, Matt Raffy and David Thompson.

The film was shot in Hamilton, Ontario, in 2021.

It premiered in the Discovery program at the 2022 Toronto International Film Festival on September 9, 2022. It was subsequently selected as the closing film of the 2022 imagineNATIVE Film and Media Arts Festival.

== Critical response ==
On the review aggregator website Rotten Tomatoes, 93% of 14 critics' reviews are positive, with an average rating of 6.5/10.

Courtney Small of That Shelf wrote that "while the film has several important things to say, its overly sweet packaging takes away some of the overall impact of its commentary. Despite not delivering the knockout punch one hopes for, there is still enough here to maintain one’s interest in both the film and whatever Maurice creates next. ROSIE reminds us that one can find community in the direst of situations, sometimes you just need to choose who that family will be."

The film was named to TIFF's annual year-end Canada's Top Ten list for 2022.

== Awards ==
The film was shortlisted for the Directors Guild of Canada's 2022 Jean-Marc Vallée DGC Discovery Award.

It won the award for Best Canadian Feature Film at the 2022 Festival international du cinéma francophone en Acadie, and the Audience Choice award at the 2022 imagineNATIVE Film and Media Arts Festival.

It also won Best Feature Film at the 2024 Sundar Prize Film Festival.
