= Saints and Warriors =

2025 Canadian documentary film

- Directed by: Patrick Shannon
- Written by: Patrick Shannon; Desi Collinson; Gaagwiis Jason Alsop
- Produced by: Michael Grand
- Cinematography: Michael Bourquin; Sean Stiller
- Edited by: Greg Ng; Hart Snider
- Music by: Mark Dolmont
- Production company: InnoNative
- Distributed by: Game Theory Films
- Release date: February 22, 2025 (Big Sky)
- Running time: 99 minutes
- Country: Canada
- Language: English

Saints and Warriors is a 2025 Canadian documentary film, directed by Patrick Shannon. The film profiles the Skidegate Saints, an amateur basketball team from Skidegate, British Columbia, as they prepare to compete in the annual All Native Basketball Tournament.

The film premiered at the Big Sky Documentary Film Festival in February 2025, and had its Canadian premiere in April at the Hot Docs Canadian International Documentary Festival. It was subsequently screened in May as the closing film of the DOXA Documentary Film Festival, where it was the winner of the Colin Low Award.

The film received two Canadian Screen Award nominations at the 14th Canadian Screen Awards in 2026, for Best Editing in a Documentary (Greg Ng, Hart Snider) and Best Sound Design in a Documentary (Gregor Phillips, D'wayne Murray, Ramsay Bourquin, May Guimarães, Alex Macia, Devon Quelch, Jake Kerr, Peter Robinson).

The film also won the award for Best Canadian Feature Film at the 2026 Sundar Prize Film Festival.

== See also ==
- List of basketball films
