= Kwantlen Polytechnic University =

University in Greater Vancouver

- Former names: Kwantlen College (1981–1995), Kwantlen University College (1995–2008)
- Motto: Through Tireless Effort, Knowledge, and Understanding
- Type: Public
- Established: 1981; 45 years ago
- Affiliations: AUCC, IAU, CICan, UnivCan ACU, CBIE, CUP
- Endowment: $13 million
- Chairperson: Erin Barnes
- Chancellor: Kim Baird
- President: Diane Purvey, acting president
- Faculty: 1,400
- Students: 7,242 (2024-25 FTE)
- Undergraduates: 14,050
- Postgraduates: 209
- Location: Surrey, Richmond, Langley, Cloverdale, British Columbia, Canada
- Campus: Urban, 92.988 acres (0.376 km^{2}) net
- Colours: Rich burgundy White
- Mascot: Eagle
- Website: www.kpu.ca

Kwantlen Polytechnic University (KPU) is a public undergraduate degree-granting polytechnic university in British Columbia, Canada, with campuses in Surrey, Richmond, Cloverdale, Whalley, and Langley. KPU is one of the largest institutions by enrolment in British Columbia garnering a total of 20,000 students and 1,400 faculty members across its five locations, encompassing the Metro Vancouver district. KPU provides undergraduate and vocational education including bachelor's degrees, associate degrees, diplomas, certificates, apprenticeships, and citations in more than 140 diverse programs. The term kwantlen means "tireless runner."

The school operates largely as an undergraduate polytechnic university, but also serves as a vocational school offering apprenticeships for the skilled trades as well as citations, certificates, and diplomas for skilled technicians and workers in support roles in various professional fields related to academia, engineering, high technology, accountancy, business administration, financial services, hospitality, nursing, medicine, architecture, and criminology.

Kwantlen Polytechnic was founded as Kwantlen College in 1981; as a response to the growing need for expanded vocational training across the Fraser Valley. In 1995, it became a university college. In 2008, the provincial government announced its intention to amend the University Act to appoint Kwantlen University College a polytechnic university. The legislation renaming the university college to university received royal assent on May 29, 2008, and KPU began operation as Kwantlen Polytechnic University on September 1, 2008. KPU became a member of the Association of Universities and Colleges of Canada (AUCC) on October 24, 2008. Also in affiliation with KPU are the International Association of Universities (IAU), the Colleges and Institutes Canada (CICan), the Association of Commonwealth Universities (ACU), the Canadian Bureau for International Education (CBIE), and the Canadian University Press (CUP).

The Globe and Mail Canadian University Report ranked KPU among the top post-secondary institutions in terms of enrolment across Canada, earning numerous grades in the A-to-B range in categories such as quality of teaching and learning, career preparation, student satisfaction and information technology. Published in Maclean's magazine in 2015, the National Survey of Student Engagement also listed KPU among the top Canadian institutions in terms of student participation, educational practices, and quality of education.

As of 2017/18, international enrolment at KPU had grown from 525 a decade earlier, to over 6,000. The school had to temporarily shutdown international enrolment due to the volume of applications. In 2018 KPU voted to increase international tuition by 15%.

From 2018 to 2023 KPU's tuition revenue from international students grew from $52 million to nearly $128 million, while its revenue from Canadian students shrank from $40 million to $36 million.

== History ==
=== Beginnings ===
Kwantlen College was formed in 1981 by separation from Douglas College. There were more than 200 suggestions in a contest to name the new South Fraser region college. The winning entry "Kwantlen" was submitted by Stan McKinnon. "Kwantlen" comes from the name of the Kwantlen First Nation in whose traditional territory the university is located. Chief Joe Gabriel of the Kwantlen First Nation gave permission for the college to use the Kwantlen name.

Following a provincial government initiative designed to increase access to degree programs in British Columbia that began in 1988, five community colleges were granted authority to offer baccalaureate degrees. These five institutions— Cariboo, Fraser Valley, Kwantlen, Malaspina, and Okanagan—were renamed university colleges. Initially, they offered degrees under the aegis of one or more of the three provincial universities. In 1995, they were awarded the authority to offer degrees in their own right. Also in 1995, the province of British Columbia enacted legislation changing the institution's name to Kwantlen University College.

=== Expansion and growth ===
==== Transition to university ====
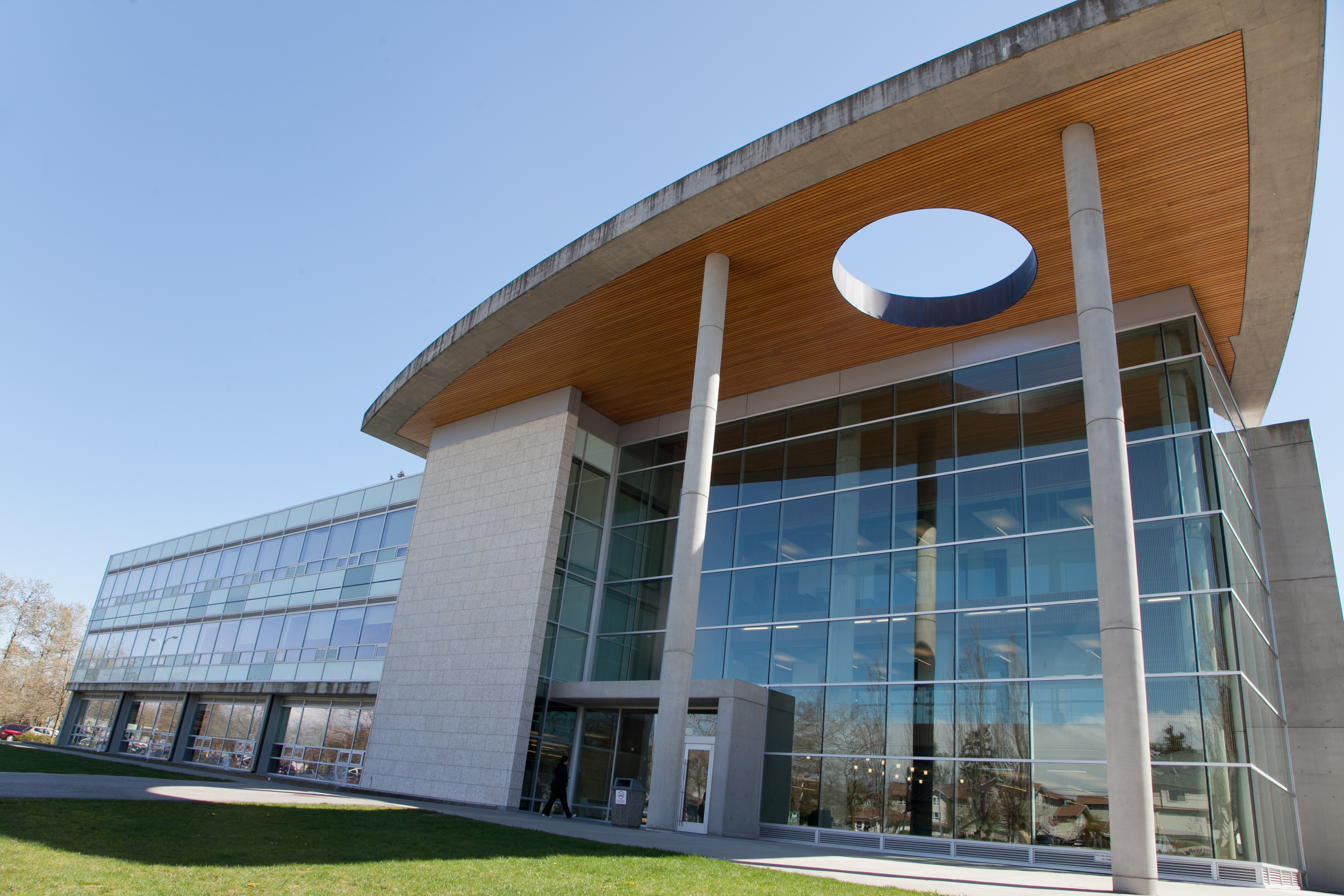
Kwantlen Polytechnic University, Surrey Campus, Main building (exterior)

In 2005, Kwantlen University College began a campaign to convince elected officials at the municipal and provincial levels, and various key community leaders, to support its efforts to become a university. Removing "college" from its official name would require approval from the government of British Columbia. In its case for the university status, Kwantlen's administrators claimed the change to Kwantlen University would:

- Enhance Kwantlen's ability to help British Columbia become the best educated, most literate jurisdiction in North America; and
- Bring multiple benefits to the fastest growing region in BC and help BC achieve long-term growth and prosperity.

In 2007, Murray Coell, Minister of Advanced Education and Minister responsible for Research and Technology was joined by special advisor Geoff Plant, to release the Campus 2020 report that recommends Kwantlen University College become Kwantlen University.

On April 22, 2008, British Columbia Premier Gordon Campbell announced that Kwantlen would become Kwantlen Polytechnic University. On April 22, 2008, the provincial government announced its intention to amend the University Act to make Kwantlen a polytechnic university, in recognition of its "versatility in providing academic, trades and horticultural training." The legislation renaming the University College to University received royal assent on May 29, 2008.

By 2017 the university agreed to lease space for a private high school intended to teach Mainland Chinese citizens intending to enter Western university systems.

==== AUCC membership ====
On October 24, 2008, KPU became a member of the Association of Universities and Colleges of Canada (AUCC).

Although the AUCC is not an official government accreditation body, its standardized membership benchmarks and requirements for members serves to ease a student's ability to transfer from undergraduate to graduate programs across Canada and the world.

== Campuses ==
KPU campuses are all in British Columbia's Lower Mainland. They are located in:

- Surrey, Cloverdale, and in the City Centre
- Richmond
- and Langley

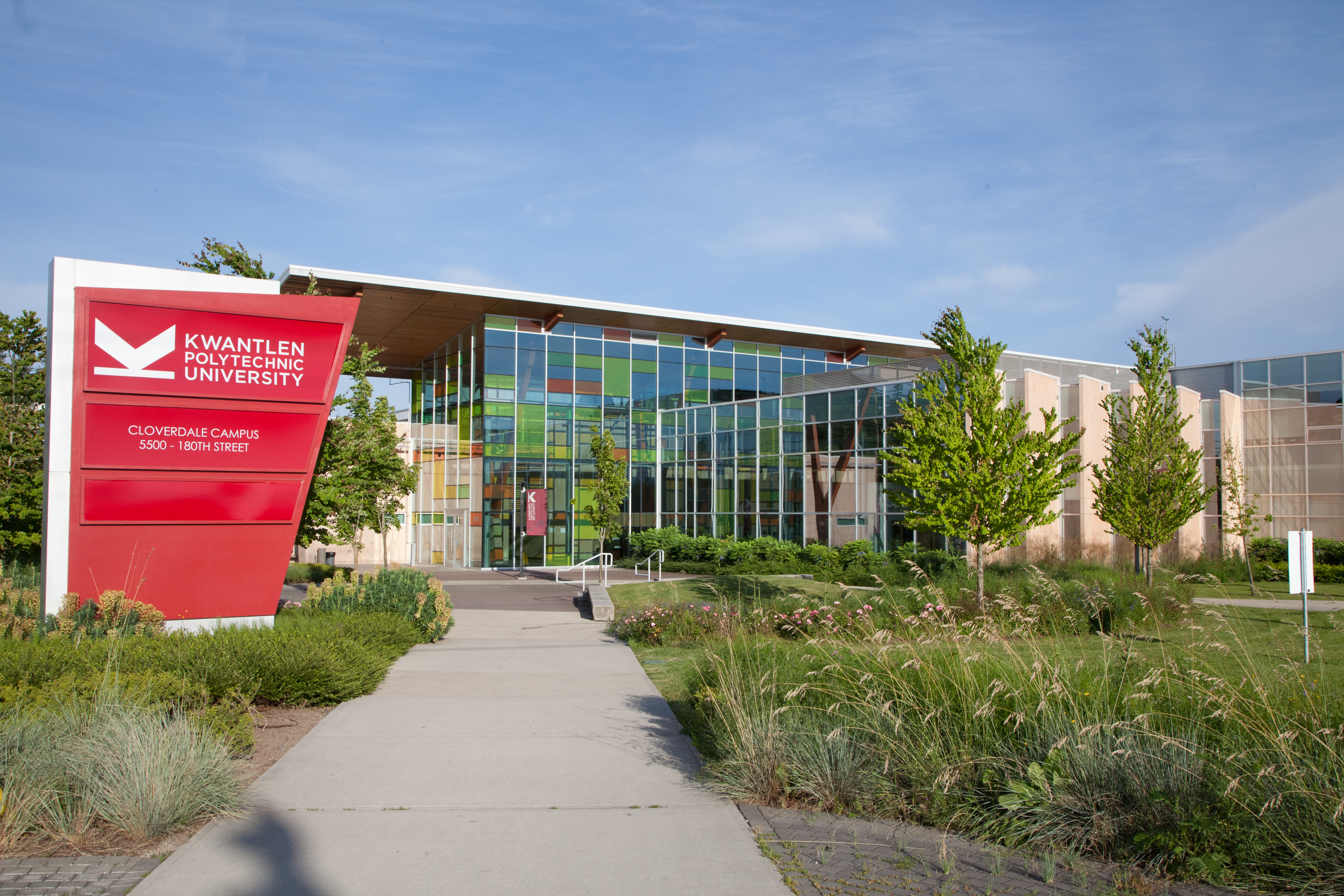
Kwantlen Polytechnic University, Cloverdale campus, front entrance (exterior)

=== KPU Tech (Cloverdale) ===
KPU Tech, formerly known as KPU Cloverdale is the second newest of the five KPU campuses, opened in April 2007. The Cloverdale campus replaced the aging Newton campus facilities which had served as the home for trades training since Kwantlen's inception. The Cloverdale building is certified as a LEED Gold building and houses KPU's Trades & Technology programs, which include appliance servicing, automotive servicing, carpentry, farrier science, masonry, parts and warehousing, welding, plumbing, and CADD technologies.

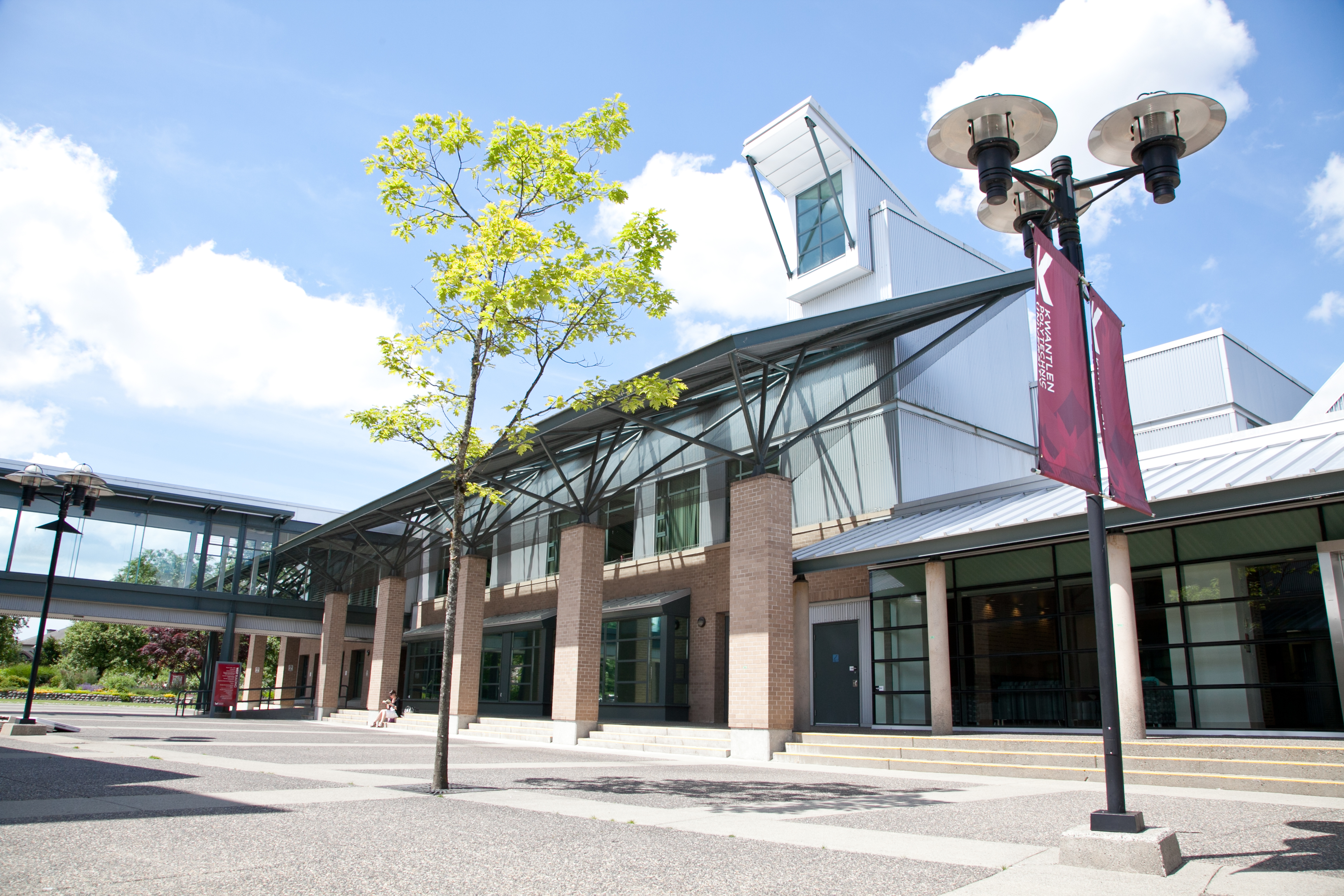
Kwantlen Polytechnic University, Langley campus, West building (exterior)

=== KPU Langley ===
The Langley campus is home to the university's School of Horticulture - which includes a field lab, greenhouses, and gardens. The Institute for Sustainable Horticulture (ISH) is also housed on this campus. The Langley campus is also home to the university's nursing programs.

The award-winning KPU Brewing and Operations is also located on this campus. KPU Langley also offers science programs, and has biology, chemistry, physics, and geology labs with industry-standard equipment.

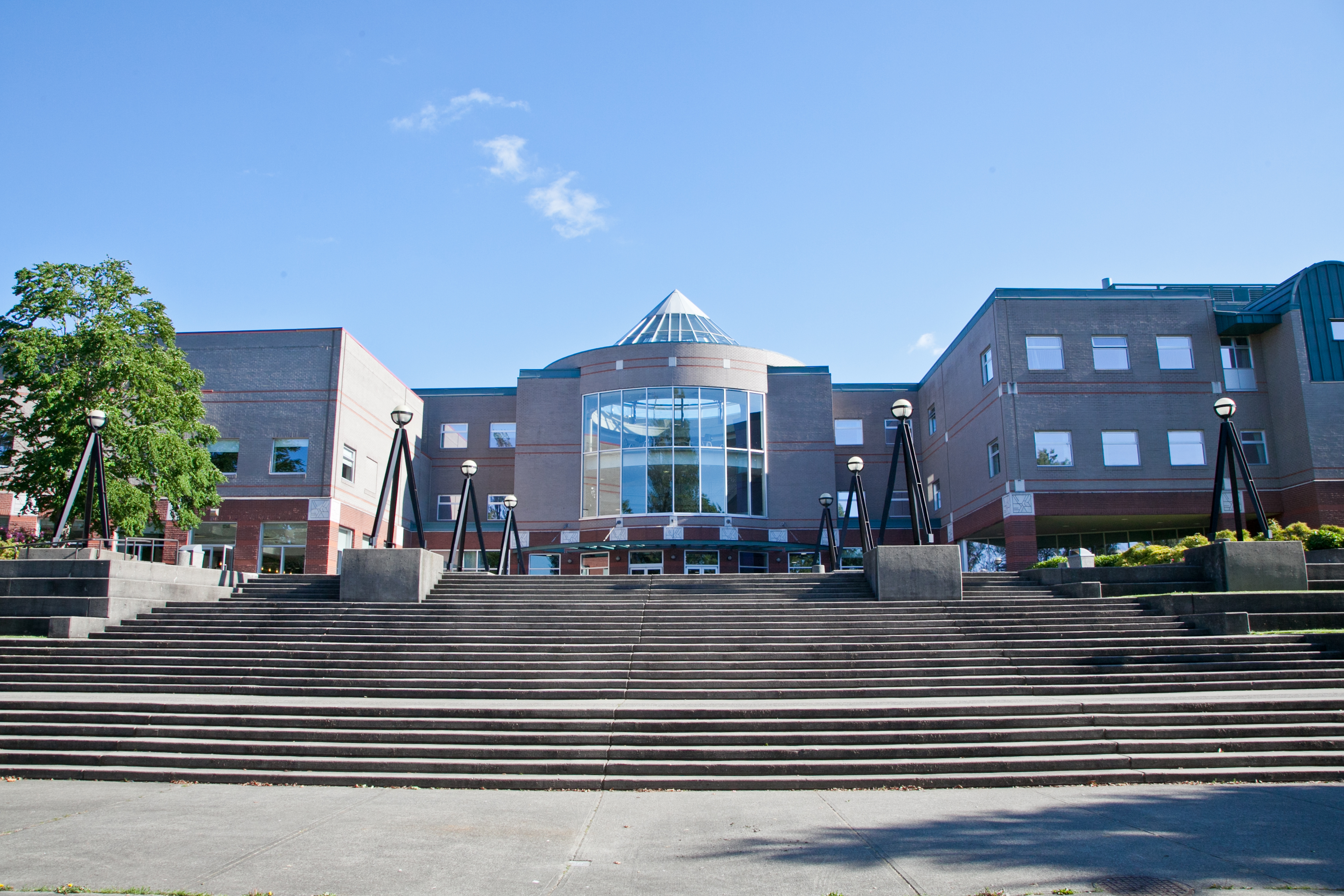
Kwantlen Polytechnic University, Richmond campus, Main (South) entrance

=== KPU Richmond ===
KPU Richmond was KPU's first official campus, established in 1981 when the institution split from Douglas College. In 2018, the campus underwent major renovations with the addition of the Wilson School of Design (WSD), named after Chip and Shannon Wilson. In January 2018, the new WSD facility officially opened its doors beside the KPU Richmond campus. This includes teaching studios and labs, gallery space and 3D printers. The campus is also home to many art and business courses as well as many science courses. The physics in modern technology program and part of the sustainable agriculture program is also based out of the Richmond Campus.

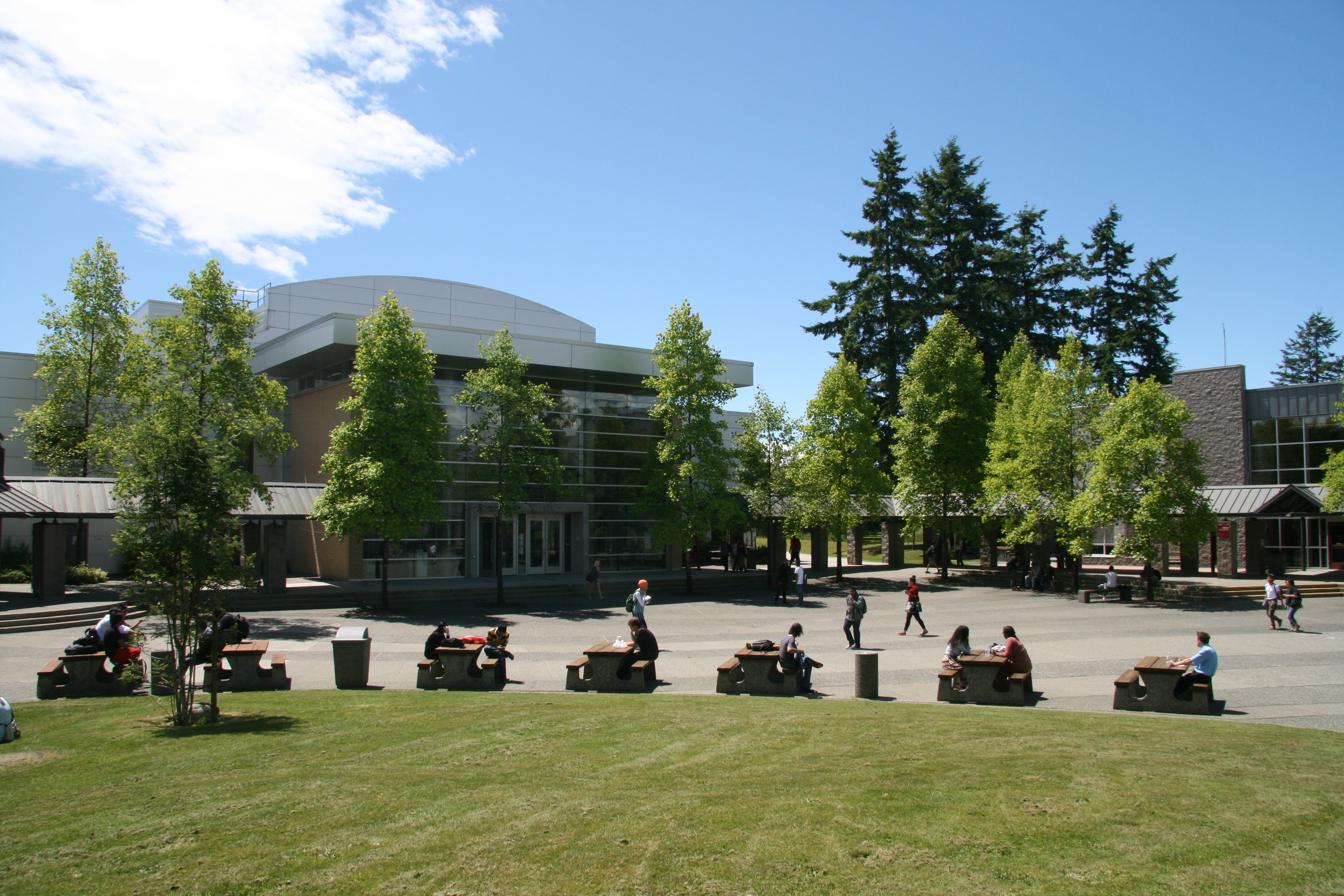
Kwantlen Polytechnic University, Surrey campus, Arbutus building and courtyard

=== KPU Surrey ===
KPU Surrey, often called the main campus, is the largest of the five campuses and offers a range of courses across multiple faculties. It is the primary location for the university's Melville School of Business and Office of the President. It is also home to research facilities like the Applied Genomics Centre and the Lifespan Cognition Lab.

KPU Sport and Recreation department operates out of Surrey, where the university's gymnasium and fitness centre, along with many recreational facilities, are located.

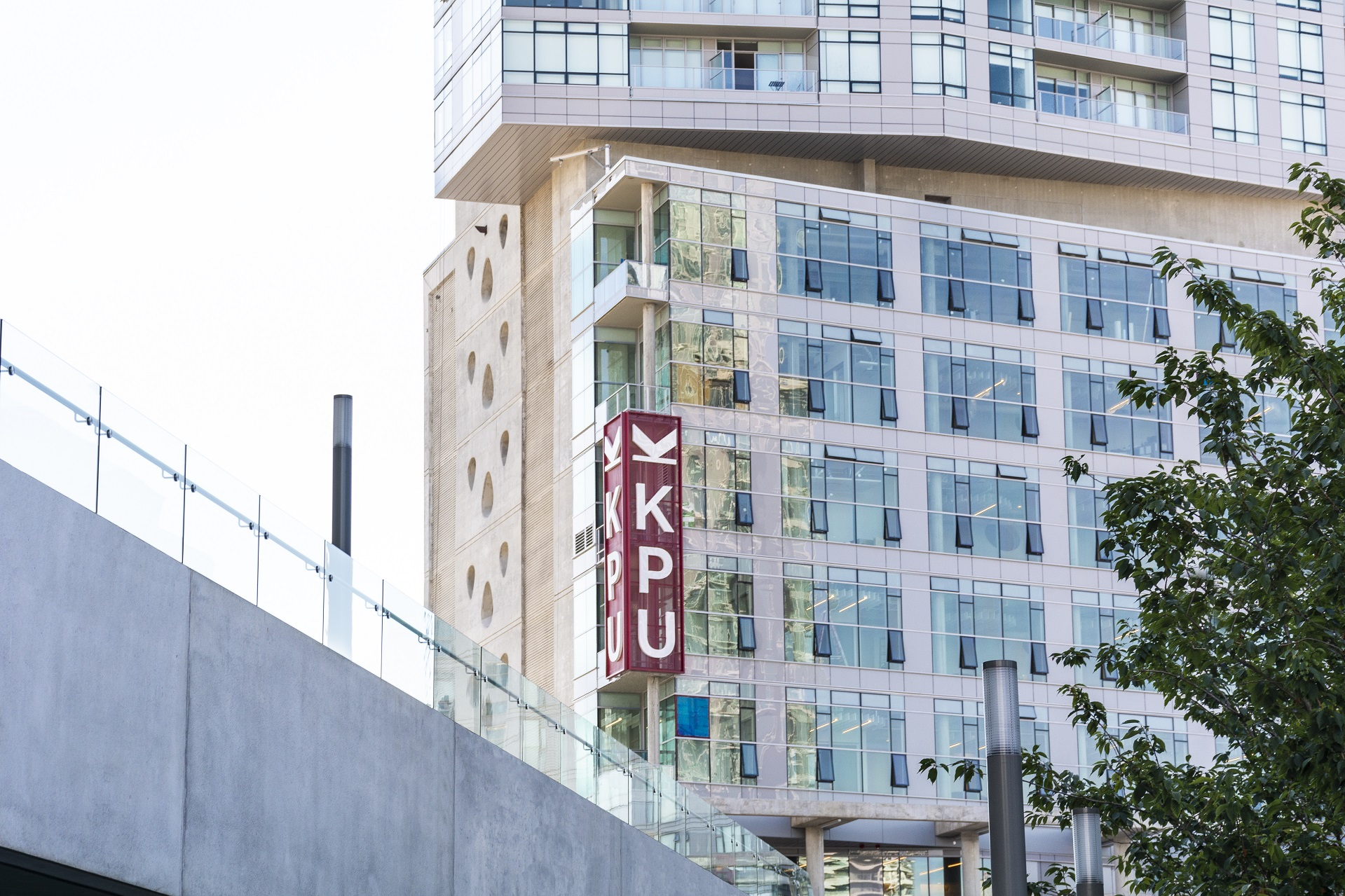
Kwantlen Polytechnic University, Civic Plaza campus (exterior)

=== KPU Civic Plaza ===
KPU Civic Plaza, the newest and smallest campus at KPU, opened in Spring 2019 in 3 Civic Plaza, a new skyscraper in the city centre. The campus occupies five of the lower floors of the building. It was designed to focus on post-baccalaureate education for mature students as well as business education.

== Academics ==
KPU has over 140 different programs across seven distinct faculties — Academic and Career Preparation, Arts, Business, Design, Health, Science and Horticulture, and Trades and Technology — where students can pursue a degree, diploma, certificate, citation, or work towards completing an apprenticeship.

=== KPU Farm Schools ===
KPU operates three farms that offer "Farm School" training as a non-credit continuing education program. The Tsawwassen First Nation Farm School, the Richmond Farm School and the Sik-E-Dakh Farm School teach students applied sustainable farming practices and include a farm incubator program for alumni.

=== Libraries ===
KPU has a library on all of its campuses, with the exception of Civic Centre. The largest library is on the Surrey campus with smaller program focused collections available in Richmond, Langley, and Cloverdale. KPU students and faculty have access to millions of items through the library, including online journal and newspaper articles, print and ebooks, streaming media and more. Items from other parts of Canada and around the globe can also be accessed through the library's free interlibrary loans service.

KPU library recently launched the χʷəχʷéy̓əm Indigenous Collection at the Surrey, Richmond and Langley campuses, with Cloverdale to follow. Each collection has a theme focused on programs taught on that campus.

=== Student enrolment ===
KPU has an enrolment of more than 20,000 students annually and over 12,000 FTE (full-time equivalency) students annually. KPU's region (Richmond, Delta, Surrey, White Rock and Langley) has a population of over 800,000.

=== Faculty and employees ===
As of winter 2024, faculty and staff number over 1,400. Over 70 faculty are involved in active sponsored research projects. KPU was named one of BC's Top Employers for the fourth consecutive year in 2024.

=== Cooperative education ===
KPU offers cooperative education in several degree programs including Bachelor of Arts, Bachelor of Business Administration, Bachelor of Technology as well as diploma programs. Such programs include dedicated work-placement semesters that match their field of study, in addition to regular studies.

=== Program transferability ===
KPU offers many transferable courses to other educational institutions, often leading to direct transfers into second-year or third-year studies at other post-secondary institutions. To aid in this, KPU is a part of the BC Transfer Guide Website, an online resource for planning and understanding transfer in the BC post-secondary education system.

=== New program development ===
KPU now offers a BSc in Physics for Modern Technology based on the Richmond campus. In February 2023, the university started offering metal fabrication as a 23-week foundation program.

In 2020, the university launched a new graduate certificate in sustainable food systems and security.

In September 2018, KPU launched a new Mechatronics and Advanced Manufacturing Technology Diploma program, along with two graduate diplomas in green business management and sustainability, and global business management.

== Student life ==
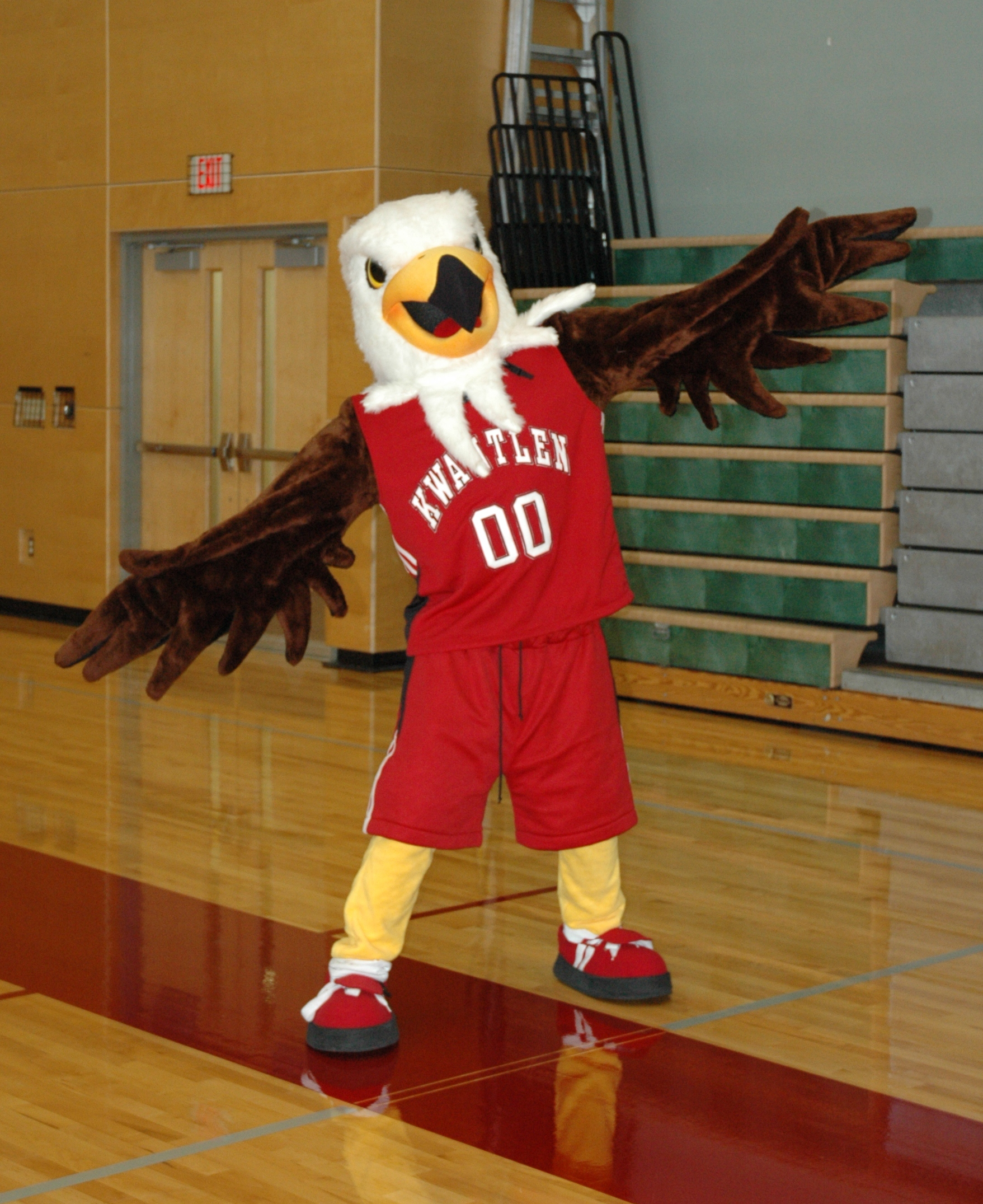
Kwinten is the mascot for the Kwantlen Eagles athletics program.

=== Athletics ===
KPU was previously a member of the Pacific Western Athletic Association (or PacWest) affiliated with the Canadian Collegiate Athletic Association. The university had six varsity teams competing in four sports (men's & women's soccer, men's & women's basketball, badminton, and golf).

The athletic teams, known as the Kwantlen Eagles, were supported by "Kwinten", the university's mascot.

KPU Athletics had notable results in the following sports:

- Women's soccer - 2009 & 2010 PacWest Provincial Champions, 2009 CCAA National bronze medalists
- Badminton - 2010 National Women's Doubles bronze, 2011 National Mixed Doubles gold, 2012 National Men's Doubles bronze, 2013 National Men's Doubles silver

The Eagles athletics program ceased operations after the 2015–16 academic year.

=== Sport and recreation (2016–present) ===
KPU Sport & Recreation offers fitness centres and studios on all campuses. Free membership to the fitness centre is available to all current students, employees, and alumni.

Tournaments, sports leagues, intramurals, and various "Lunch & Lawn" activities are available through KPU Sport & Recreation.

=== Kwantlen Student Association ===
The Kwantlen Student Association (KSA) is an elected student body that contributes to community life, and allocates student funds to social, cultural and entertainment programs for students. The KSA was founded as the Kwantlen College Student Society under the Society Act of British Columbia in August 1981.

Since the early 1980s the KSA has also been affiliated with the Canadian Federation of Students as one of its founding members. For a brief period in the late 1990s, the KSA was the only Student Association in Canada to have held membership within both the Canadian Federation of Students and the Canadian Alliance of Student Associations at the same time. In March 2008, the Kwantlen Student Association (KSA) organized a referendum to disaffiliate from the CFS. One of the reasons given for disaffiliation was media coverage in 2007, alleging corruption within the Douglas Students' Union of the CFS. The KSA also criticized the financial transparency of CFS-BC and argued that the CFS was ineffective at lobbying for students. As of January 2013, the KSA was attempting to de-federate from the CFS, and joined the "Alliance of BC Students" as an alternative lobbying body.

At a Special General Meeting held on November 30, 2011, Kwantlen students voted 352 to 0 to remove thirteen directors of the KSA and place them into "bad standing" where they would be unable to run for future office. The vote was held over allegations of conflicts of interest in settling litigation, association with the embezzlement of two million dollars of student funds, and a 40% pay raise to the elected officials on their first day of office, among other issues.

Membership is mandatory for students. The membership delegates its authority over the society's day-to-day operations to an elected board of directors (council), which is bound to operate under a constitution and a set of bylaws.

Each February, KPU students may run for and elect a council to a one-year term of office from April 1 to March 31. The council is responsible for, and exercises full control over, the affairs of the society, while the executive members assist with managing the day-to-day operations of the society. The council holds regularly scheduled meetings at least twice each month, excluding July, August and December.

The KSA operates a student-run cafe, Grassroots Cafe, and a social justice centre on campus. It employs an ombudsperson, distributes day planners, and provides advocacy services as well as funding for campus clubs, events, conferences, and special interest groups. Through the KSA, students and other members of the Kwantlen community are also eligible for special discounts including bus and train passes, movie tickets, and other seasonal offers. Full-time students who do not have comparable coverage elsewhere are automatically eligible to receive benefits from a health and dental plan. The organization's main office is located at the Surrey Campus of Kwantlen Polytechnic University. The society also has offices and provides services at KPU's three other campuses in Cloverdale, Langley and Richmond. The KSA does not own a student union building.

=== The Runner ===
The Runner is the institution's independent student newspaper. It is a member of the Canadian University Press. Since early 2009, The Runner has added to Kwantlen's student life by providing the community with "a freely distributed, year-round, multi-campus, student-owned, student-run news and campus culture publication."

It receives some of its funds from the Kwantlen Student Association under a levy; however, it is run as a separate, autonomous incorporated B.C. non-profit society, Polytechnic Ink Publishing Society (PIPS), with its own Kwantlen student board of directors.

== KDocsFF ==
KDocsFF, also known as the KDocs Film Festival, is a social justice documentary film festival hosted by KPU. The festival presents documentary films, speakers, panel discussions, and question-and-answer sessions focused on social justice issues such as Indigenous rights, climate change, anti-racism, gender equity, press freedom, democracy, housing, migration, and 2SLGBTQ+ communities.

=== History ===
KDocsFF began in 2012 as a single-film event and later developed into a multi-day documentary film festival. It was created by KPU instructor Janice Morris as a way to increase student engagement through documentary film. The festival was founded to use documentary film as a way to encourage discussion of social justice issues.

In 2021, due to the COVID-19 pandemic, the festival was held online, opening with And Then They Came for Us, a documentary about the Japanese American internment. Actor and activist George Takei participated in an online panel discussion connected to the screening.

In 2023, KDocsFF returned to in-person programming, with screenings at the Vancouver International Film Centre. Its 2024 edition was the festival's 10th edition and featured 19 films under the theme "Journeys in Solidarity".

In December 2024, KDocsFF's annual festival and year-round programming were placed on hiatus after Morris suffered a hip fracture, while its community outreach program and social justice lab continued under Professor Emeritus Greg Chan.

=== Programs ===
In addition to its annual festival, KDocsFF has operated related programs including KDocs Talks, a community outreach program, a social justice lab, and an emerging filmmaker residency program. The KDocsFF Emerging Filmmaker Residency Prize is a partnership between KDocsFF and Sundar Prize Film Festival.

== See also ==
- Canadian Inter-University Sport
- List of universities in British Columbia
- Higher education in British Columbia
