= Vancouver Pride Parade =

Annual LGBT event in British Columbia, Canada

- Logo adopted by the Vancouver Pride Society in 2011
- Location: Vancouver, British Columbia
- Country: Canada

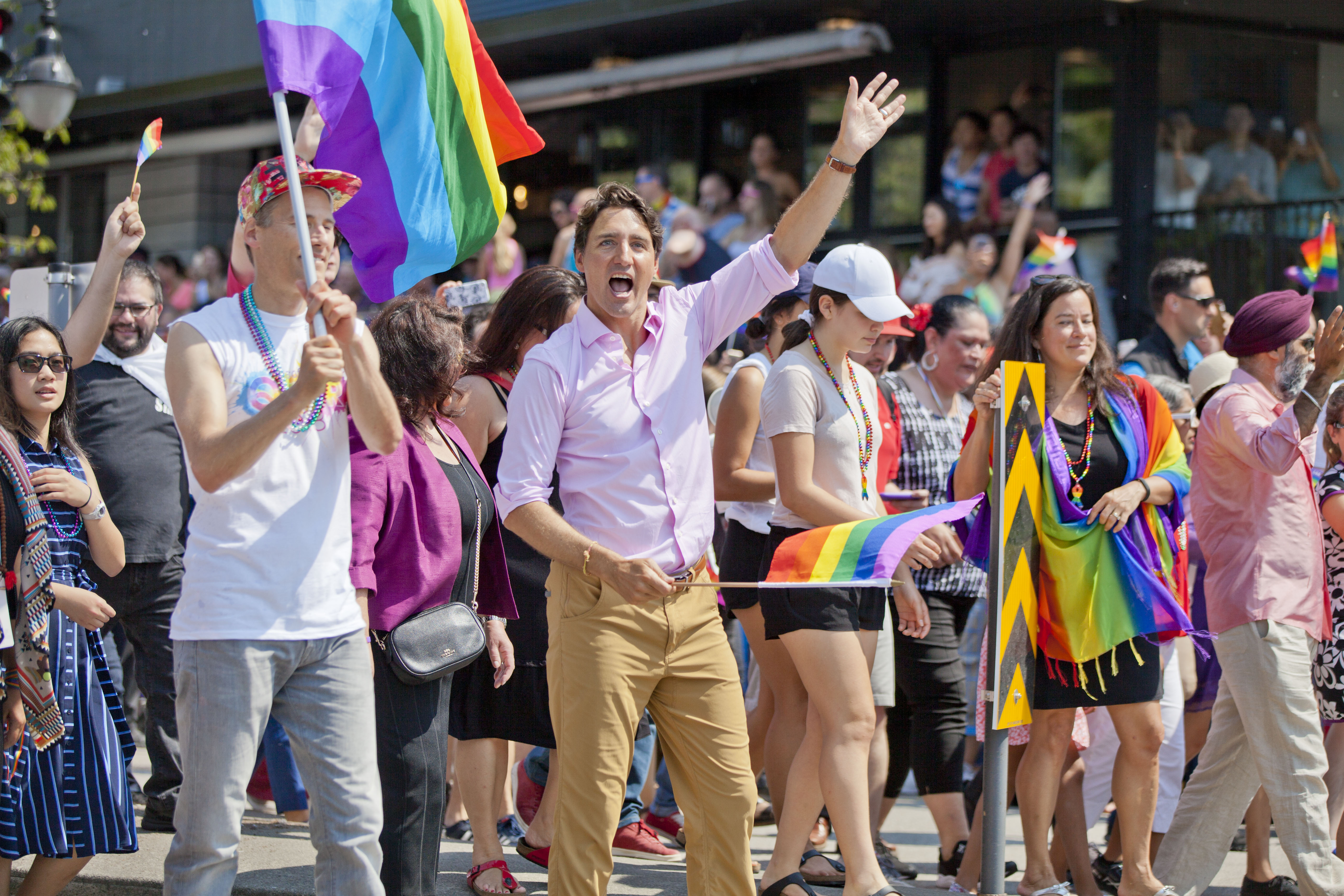
Canadian prime minister Justin Trudeau, MP Jody Wilson-Raybould and Vancouver mayor Gregor Robertson at the 2018 Pride Parade

The Vancouver Pride Parade and Festival is an annual LGBT Pride event, held each year in Vancouver, British Columbia, to celebrate lesbian, gay, bisexual, transgender, other queer people and their allies. It is run by the Vancouver Pride Society (VPS), a not-for-profit, volunteer-run organization that seeks to "produce inclusive, celebratory events, and advocacy for LGBTQAI2S+". Vancouver's Pride Parade is the largest parade of any kind in Western Canada.

Due to the COVID-19 pandemic in British Columbia and the BC Provincial Health Officer order restricting mass gatherings to 50 people or less, 2020 Pride in-person events were moved online. The Vancouver Pride Society has dubbed the festival #vanvirtualpride 2020 and it culminates on August 2 with a virtual parade. A public art exhibition was also held with pieces from local two-spirit, trans and queer artists displayed around the city.

== History ==
Vancouver's earliest Pride celebrations began when the Gay Alliance Toward Equality (GATE) organized a picnic and art exhibit in Ceperley Park. The August 1973 edition of GATE's newspaper, Gay Tide, features coverage of "Gay Pride Week '73", and was followed shortly thereafter by the first Pride parade in 1978. In 2011 some activists claimed that the actual Pride parade did not start until 1981. The parade, which covered only one side of the street while the other remained open to traffic, ran from Nelson Park to Alexandra Park via Thurlow, Pacific and Beach. One of the notable founders of the Pride Parade, Barb Snelgrove, was inducted into the Vancouver Queer Hall of Fame in 2013.

The three-year theme for the 2009–2011 Pride Parade and Festival was Educate, Liberate, Celebrate.

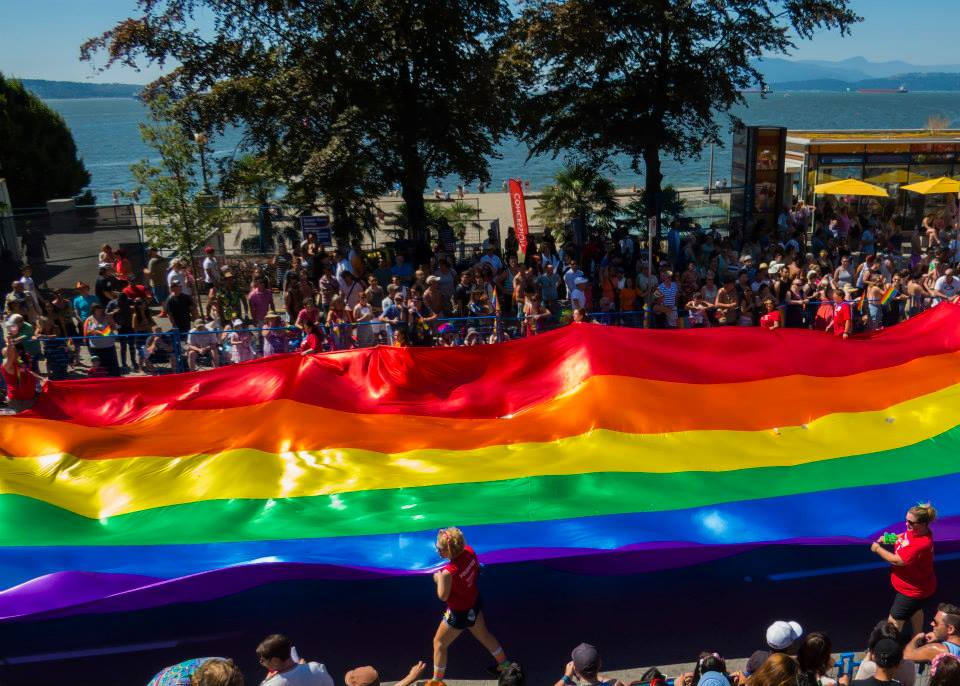
2014 Vancouver Pride Parade

== Leadership and organization ==
The Pride Parade and Festival is run by the Vancouver Pride Society (VPS), a not-for-profit, volunteer-run organization. The mission of the VPS is that it "strives to produce events that reflect the pride the LGBTQAI2S+ community has in itself, by strengthening the sense of community, and contributing to the vibrancy, health and overall well-being of all persons in the community."

The VPS is managed by a 9-member volunteer board of directors and a handful of paid staff, who handle the finances, logistics and operations of the organization and events. In addition, many hundreds of volunteers are involved in running the events. The events are funded through annual donations, corporate sponsorships, the City of Vancouver, parade entry fees, festival vendor fees, and donations collected during events.

== Parade ==
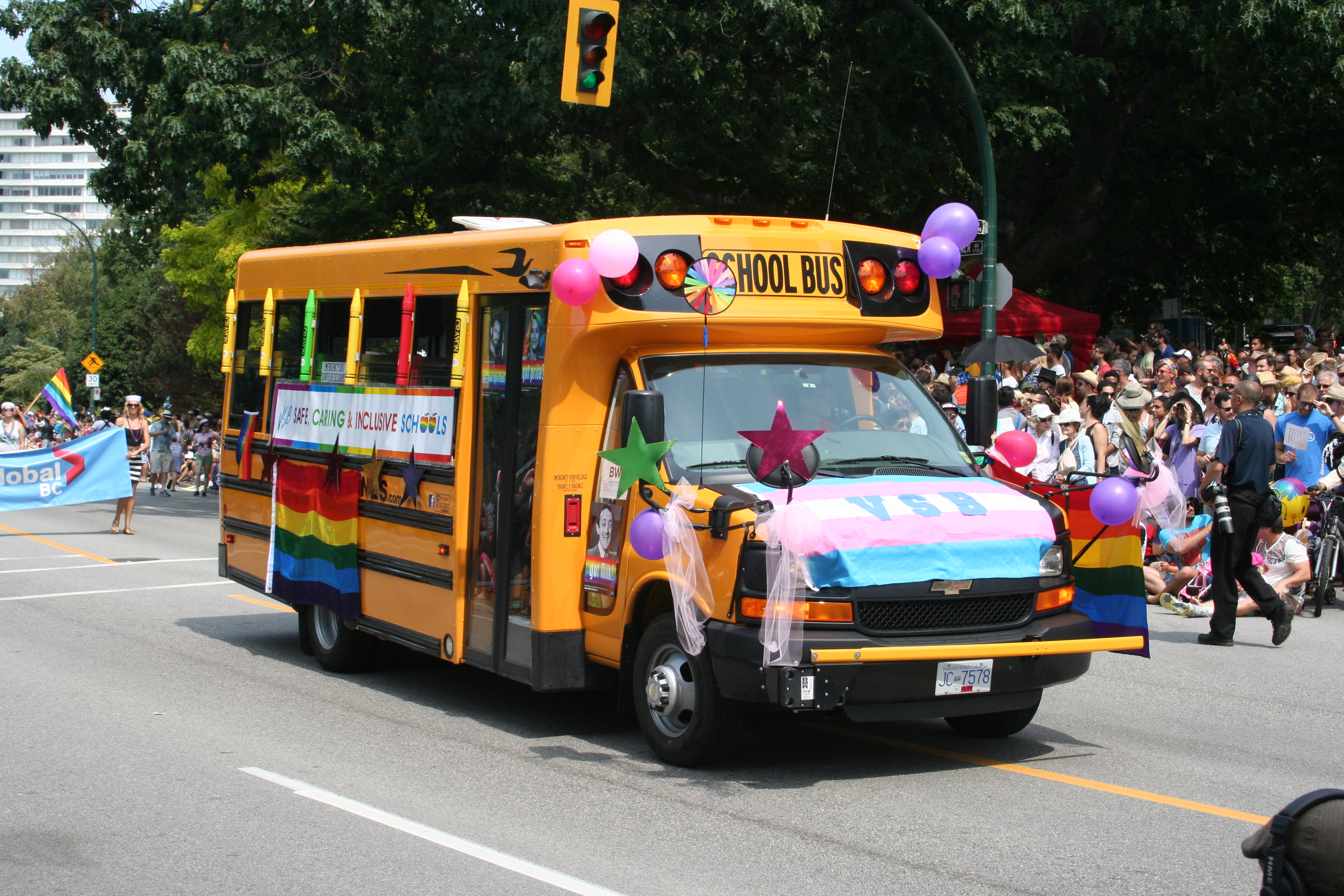
LGBTQ Pride flags on the side of a school bus in the Vancouver Pride parade 2015

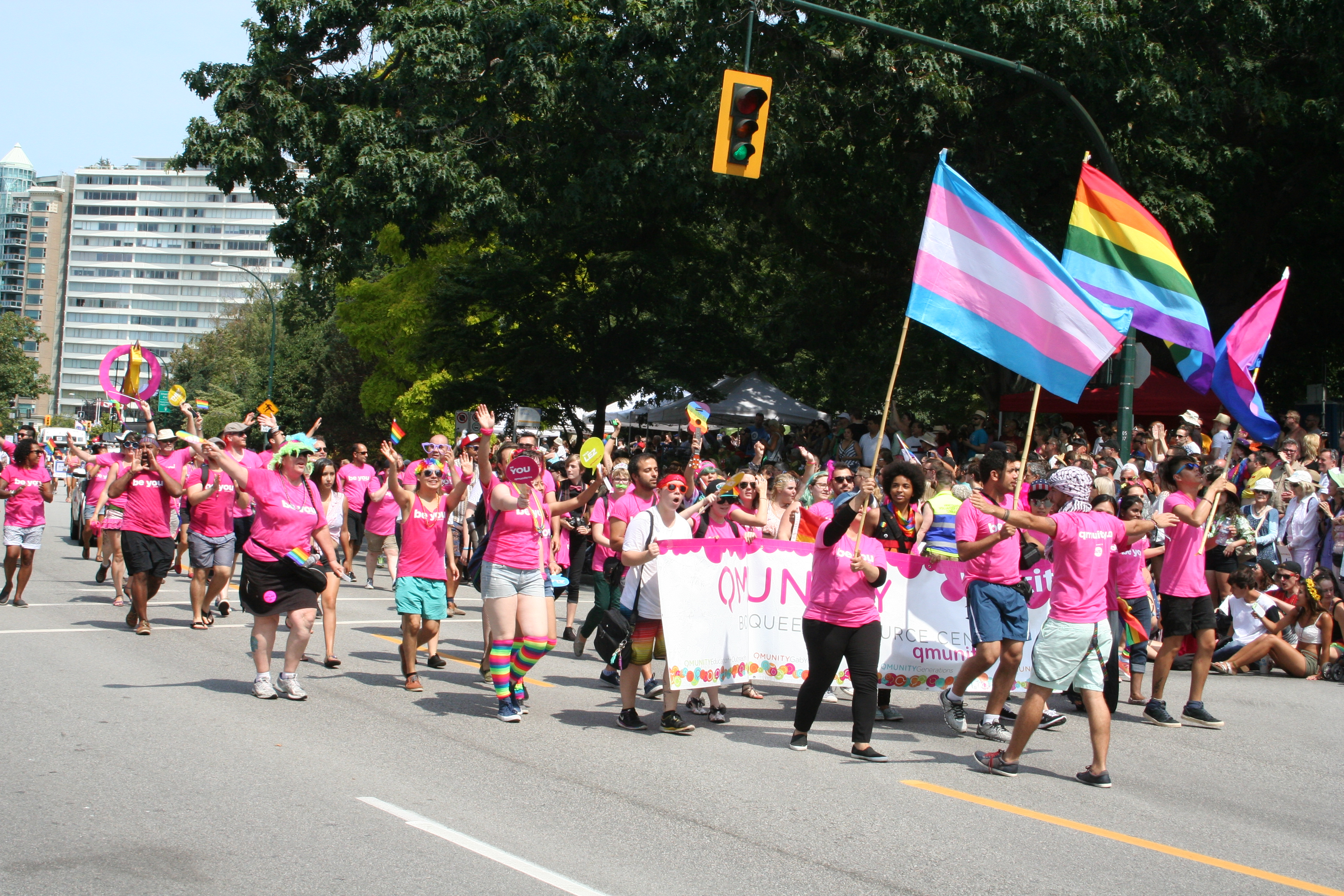
2015 Vancouver LGBTQ Pride parade

The annual Pride parade is the largest parade in Western Canada, and one of the largest in North America. Starting at 12 noon on the day of the Pride Festival, at Robson Street and Thurlow Street, the parade heads west down Robson to Denman Street, follows Denman to Pacific and Beach Avenues and finishes at the Sunset Beach Festival site.

The parade has a contingent of approximately 150 entries, including cars, floats and marching units. Among the regulars are the Vancouver Police and Fire Departments, Dykes on Bikes, PFLAG, Little Sister's Bookstore, and many of the bars and clubs from the Davie Village. A regular feature of each parade is an institution of parade marshals. Often it is a person representing a country where similar events are banned and gay people are still persecuted. The grand marshal in 2010 was Nikolai Alekseev from Moscow, Russia.

In 2013, the Pride Parade was granted official civic status by the City of Vancouver.

On July 21, 2020, the VPS informed the BC Liberals that they were not permitted to take part in the virtual parade due to inaction on Chilliwack-Kent MLA Laurie Throness, who has been accused of homophobic and transphobic comments and views.

== Festival and events ==
The Sunset Beach Festival takes place on the Sunday of the August long weekend, concurrently with the Pride parade. Located at Sunset Beach at the end of the parade route, the festival includes a diverse collection of vendors, entertainment, family activities and beer gardens.

In addition to the Pride Parade and Festival, the VPS organizes a number of events throughout the summer, including East Side Pride, held on the anniversary of the Stonewall Riots, Gay Day @ Playland, Movie Night, Picnic in the Park, in Stanley Park, Davie Street Pride Party, a large street party in the heart of the Davie Village, the Terry Wallace Memorial Breakfast and Pride Youth Dance in the evening after the parade and festival.
