= Image+Nation =

LGBTQ film festival in Quebec, Canada

image+nation. LGBTQueer Montreal
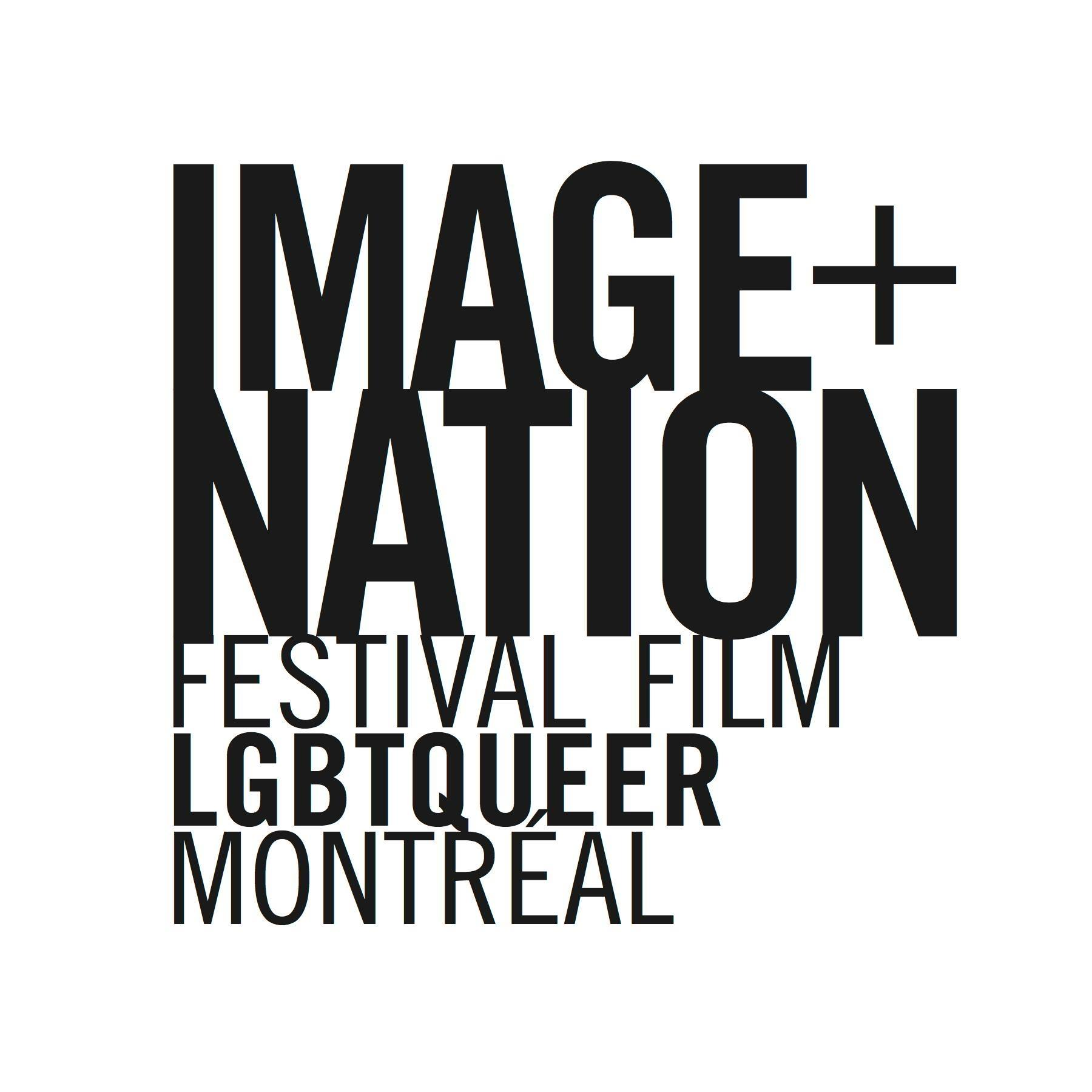
- Genre: Film festival
- Frequency: Annual, in November
- Locations: Montreal, Quebec, Canada
- Founded: 1987
- Website: www.image-nation.org/en/home-page/

image+nation. LGBT2SQueer Montreal is an annual eleven-day film festival, which takes place in Montreal, Quebec, Canada. Held in November each year, the festival is dedicated to sharing the stories and experiences of LGBTQ+ people and is the first festival of its kind in Canada.

The festival's name was selected to work bilingually in both English and French; the words "image" and "nation" have the same spelling and meaning in both languages, and when combined into one name with the plus sign, representing "and" in English or "et" in French, the pronunciation remains homophonous in both languages with imagination.

== History ==
Launched in 1987, the festival's mission is to represent, protect and prepare the present and future generations of queer storytellers and media makers while building empathy through sharing stories with audiences in Canada and throughout the world.

Each year the festival screens the best of local and international queer cinema at various Montréal venues, focusing on new voices and evolving means of storytelling in contemporary culture. Many of the early films and activist videos screened at image+nation. LGBT2SQueer Montreal dealt with resistance, liberation, AIDS and HIV. During this pre-internet era, it was difficult for festival organizers to find films and videos to present until an LGBTQ+ festival circuit began in the early ’90s, coinciding with the indie “New Queer Cinema” movement.

In 2016, the festival developed a series of educational and mentoring programs dedicated to nurturing emerging content, under the name of I+N Explore.

The festival is nearing its 40th anniversary in 2027. In 2026 image+nation. LGBT2SQueer Montreal festival will place with 175+ features, documentaries, shorts and queer favourites. Venues included the Monument National, Concordia's Sir George Williams Auditorium, J.A. de Sève Cinema, the Phi Centre, ONF/NFB and Cin and Cinéma Public.

The event's Programming Director is Kat Setzer, and its Executive Director is Charlie Boudreau.

== Awards and prizes ==
- Jury Prize
- Special Jury Award
- Audience Award

== See also ==
- List of LGBT film festivals
- List of film festivals in Canada
