= VIFF Centre =

Cinema and film centre in Vancouver, British Columbia, Canada

- Vancity Theatre; Vancouver International Film Centre
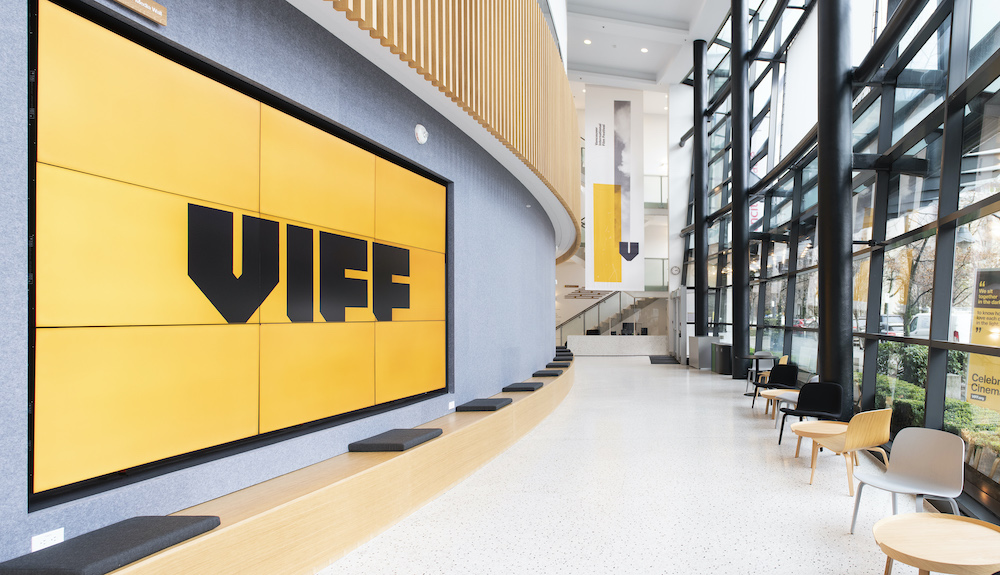
- The interior of the VIFF Centre in 2021
- Interactive map of VIFF Centre
- Address: 1181 Seymour Street; Vancouver, British Columbia; V6B 3M7
- Coordinates: 49.2770°N 123.1249°W
- Owner: Vancouver International Film Festival
- Capacity: 175
- Type: Movie theatre
- Screen: 1

Construction
- Opened: September 2005
- Architects: Hewitt and Kwasnicky Architects

Website
- viff.org

The VIFF Centre (formerly the Vancouver International Film Centre and the Vancity Theatre) is a cinema and film centre located at 1181 Seymour Street in downtown Vancouver, British Columbia, Canada, that shows new independent films, international releases, repertory screenings, filmmaker talks, and special cultural events all year. The centre is also home to VIFF (Vancouver International Film Festival), one of Canada’s largest film festivals, which takes place across multiple venues throughout Vancouver each fall.

The VIFF Centre houses the state-of-the-art 170-seat VIFF Cinema and the 40-seat Lochmaddy Studio Theatre, as well as the offices for the Vancouver International Film Festival.

The facility is available to rent and can accommodate seminars, live performances, film, video, and multimedia presentations.

The building, designed by Hewitt and Kwasnicky Architects, opened in September 2005, just in time for the 2005 Vancouver International Film Festival. In December of that year, the Vancity Theatre formally launched year-round repertory cinema programming. The theatre was sponsored by and named for the Vancity credit union, although prior to the complex's launch, the theatre was stuck in a dispute that might have threatened the sponsorship, or even forced VIFF to refund Vancity's entire donation to the project, because it was deemed to be in conflict with the city's official naming rights policy at the time.

Renovations between 2019 and 2020, which were completed in time for the 2020 Vancouver International Film Festival, added a 17-ft screen, 40-seat theatre, the Lochmaddy Studio Theatre, for smaller audience presentations, a new media lab to present new media and virtual reality projects, an education suite and a video wall in the complex's atrium.

In 2024, the VIFF Centre underwent a large renovation, installing a state-of-the-art 4k projector and Dolby Atmos immersive sound while maintaining, but refurbishing, the large, comfortable seats that are popular with film-goers.

== See also ==
- TIFF Lightbox
