= Amar Sangha =

Canadian social worker and documentary film producer

- Born: Amar Singh Sangha (age 54); Gravesend, Kent, England
- Education: London School of Economics; Dalhousie University; University of British Columbia; Douglas College
- Occupations: Social Worker and Counsellor and Film Producer
- Website: www.amarsangha.com

Amar Singh Sangha MSM is a Canadian social worker and documentary film producer. He is the founder of Sher Pride which is a registered charity for lesbian, gay, bisexual, transgender, queer, and intersex (LGBTQI+) South Asians and their friends. Sangha was the first Sikh to become a Grand Marshal of the Vancouver Pride Parade. Sangha received the Meritorious Service Medal from Governor General Julie Payette in 2018 for his work founding Sher Pride. Sangha's first short documentary film, My Name Was January, won 14 awards and garnered 66 official selections at film festivals around the world. Sangha's debut feature documentary, Emergence: Out of the Shadows, was an official selection at Out on Film in Atlanta, Image+Nation in Montreal, and Reelworld in Toronto. The film was the closing night film at both the South Asian Film Festival of Montreal and the Vancouver International South Asian Film Festival where it picked up Best Documentary. Emergence: Out of the Shadows also had a double festival premiere at the KASHISH Mumbai International Queer Film Festival and the Mumbai International Film Festival during the same week, where it was in competition at both film festivals for Best Documentary. The film also had an in-person and online screening at the 46th annual Frameline: San Francisco International LGBTQ+ Film Festival which is "the longest-running, largest and most widely recognized LGBTQ+ film exhibition event in the world."

== Early life ==
Sangha was born in Gravesend, Kent, England. His birth name is Amar Singh Sangha. He was raised in metro Vancouver, British Columbia, Canada, specifically Surrey and North Delta. His father, Dalbir Singh Sangha, and his mother, Jaspal Kaur Sangha, are both of the Sikh faith from Punjab, India. Sangha was largely raised by his mother. His mother received a standing ovation for delivering a speech about embracing her gay son in 2018. Sangha has an older and younger brother, and a half-brother through his father's second marriage.

== Education and career ==
Sangha completed an MSc in Public Administration and Public Policy from the Department of Government from the London School of Economics. He has a Master of Social Work from Dalhousie University in Halifax, Nova Scotia, as well as a Bachelor of Social Work from the University of British Columbia with a First Class Standing. In addition, Sangha completed an Associate of Arts Degree at Douglas College in New Westminster, British Columbia, and graduated Grade 12 from Frank Hurt Secondary in Surrey.

Sangha is a Registered Clinical Social Worker and a Registered Clinical Counsellor with a private counselling practice in North Delta. He previously worked as an instructor, clinician, social worker, team leader, and youth counsellor.

== Personal life ==
Sangha is a gay South Asian man and described his coming out experience as very alienating and isolating as a teenager, and he had a hard time with internalized homophobia. In November 2016, Sangha provided support and assistance for a Sikh international student from Punjab, India who was disowned by his family for being gay and who contacted Sher Pride for help. Sangha later referred to this student as part of the family. In May 2020, Sangha wrote a commentary which was published in The Times of India which described a "spiritual experience" he had when he was 19. The commentary further described the impact this experience had on his social work career and community service as a gay activist, as well as helping him come to terms with his sexuality as a gay Punjabi Sikh male. On October 10, 2020, on World Mental Health Day, the London School of Economics Alumni published on their internal communication channels and social media platforms a commentary Amar wrote about being "blessed with bipolar," because it makes him live as a creative humanitarian. He is also the recipient of the Courage to Come Back Award from Coast Mental Health for 2021. In January 2022, Sangha wrote a commentary that was published in India that explained his "spiritual philosophy" on being gay, having children, and God.

== Sher Pride ==
Sangha founded Sher Pride in April 2008. He launched the Dosti project which was an anti-bullying, anti-racism, homophobia, and transphobia workshop that went into high schools. The project was unique because it included coming out stories from a South Asian perspective. Sangha launched the Out and Proud project which profiled amazing queer South Asians from around the world including from Canada, United States, United Kingdom, and India. Sangha developed a free crisis counselling program and peer support groups for Sher Pride members. In 2015, Sangha launched the January Marie Lapuz Youth Leadership Award to recognize youth from all over the world doing great work in the LGBTQ community. In 2016, Sangha became the first Sikh to become the Grand Marshal of the Vancouver Pride Parade. In 2017, Sangha led the Sher Pride contingent in the Vancouver Vaisakhi Parade and in doing so made history as the first LGBTQ South Asian organization to ever march in the parade. In 2018, Sangha celebrated the tenth anniversary of Sher Pride with the Desi-Q Cultural Celebration in Surrey. In 2019, Sangha successfully lobbied the City of Delta in British Columbia, on behalf of Sher Pride, to install rainbow park benches in the city to support diversity and inclusion. In July 2020, Sangha, on behalf of Sher Pride, released Queersome Desi Resources which is a specially curated comprehensive list of Queer South Asian Resources from around the world. As part of Pride celebrations in British Columbia in 2020, the CBC profiled Sangha as part of a Proud to Shine campaign to recognize his work as a social worker, filmmaker, and founder of Sher Pride. In September 2021, Sangha delivered the Paul Cheng Memorial Lecture to incoming social work students at the University of British Columbia. He was selected as the 2020 winner of the Inspiring Social Worker of the Year Award in part for his work in Sher Pride. The Sher Vancouver LGBTQ Friends Society became a registered charity on July 6, 2021. In November 2023, Sher Pride proudly launched Safar with Pride, described as a pioneering Desi Queer Learning Hub. This initiative is a direct response to the increasing need to combat discrimination, provide support, and empower LGBTQ+ South Asians amidst rising anti-LGBTQ+ sentiments. The development of such a hub indicates a proactive approach to addressing systemic issues and providing educational resources. In 2024, Sher Pride earned official certification as a Living Wage Employer from the Employers Committee of the Vancity Community Foundation’s Living Wage for Families BC campaign.

== Dignity Seniors Society ==
Sangha is one of the founders of the Dignity Seniors Society which is a non-profit society that aims to support vulnerable LGBTQ seniors in Vancouver. The Dignity Seniors Society was originally the Dignity House Advisory Committee (DHAC) which was a Master of Social Work practicum project of Sangha. The intent of the DHAC was to build affordable housing for LGBTQ seniors. Sangha managed to secure sufficient funds from the Vancity Community Foundation and the United Way of the Lower Mainland to complete a market survey of the need and demand for affordable housing within the community.

== Books and writing ==
Sangha has been a contributor for The Times of India, Huffington Post Canada, Vancouver Observer, and Georgia Straight. His writings focus on social justice themes such as alleviating poverty, improving access to the legal system and democracy, LGBTQ rights, social affairs, issues that impact the South Asian community, and Canadian, British Columbian, and local politics from Surrey.

Sangha has published three books through AuthorHouse. Imagine: Ideas that Challenge the Status Quo (2010), The Modern Thinker: Timeless Ideas, Inspiration, and Hope for the 21st Century (2011), and Catalyst: A Collection of Commentaries to Get Us Talking (2013). Catalyst was a Finalist in the Current Events and Social Change category of the Next Generation Indie Book Awards of 2014.

=== The Golden Idea ===
The Golden Idea is a peace proposal developed by Sangha to address the Israeli–Palestinian conflict. First published in The Jerusalem Post on July 6, 2011, it proposes the creation of an "Abraham Union", in which Israel and Palestine would remain independent states while sharing a federal government, with Jerusalem as their common capital. Drawing on the model of the European Union and Canada's federal system, the proposal calls for a shared constitution, protection of human rights, economic cooperation and equal rights for Israelis and Palestinians. Sangha revisited the proposal in 2025, describing it as a possible framework for peaceful coexistence that respects the national identities and interests of both peoples.

== Films ==
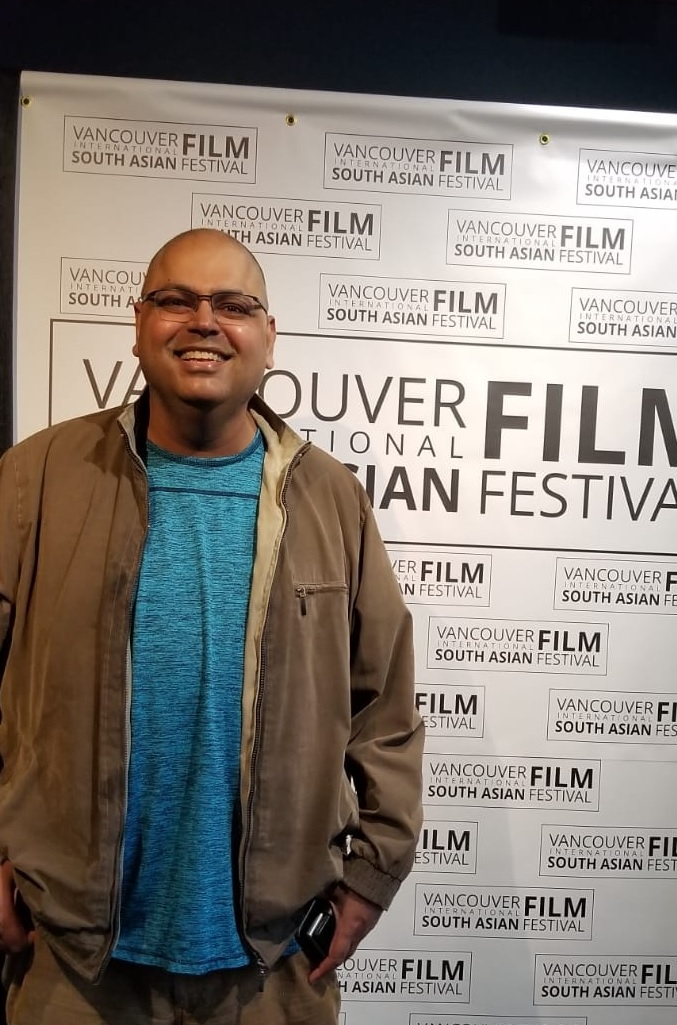
Sangha at the Vancouver International South Asian Film Festival in 2019

Sangha produced a short documentary film directed by Elina Gress and Lenee Son, My Name Was January. It was about Sher Pride's late social coordinator, January Marie Lapuz, who was tragically murdered in New Westminster in September 2012. The film focuses on January's strengths and struggles and provides a platform for other trans women of colour to have a voice. My Name Was January was an official selection at the National Screen Institute Online Short Film Festival in Winnipeg, Manitoba. It was also a Finalist at the San Francisco Bay Area Sex Worker Film and Arts Festival. My Name Was January won 13 awards, and garnered 56 official selections at film festivals around the world. In 2018, the New West Record selected Sangha as one of the Top 10 people who had an impact in the arts in New Westminster.

Sangha's debut feature documentary film, this time directed by Vinay Giridhar entitled, Emergence: Out of the Shadows, is about gay and lesbian South Asian people and their coming out journey and the reactions of the parents. He received training and mentorship from the National Screen Institute in Winnipeg, Manitoba to help him with Emergence: Out of the Shadows. The film had its World Premiere at Cinema Diverse: The Palm Springs LGBTQ Film Festival where it picked up a Festival Favourite award, and started its festival run in other US festivals such as Out On Film in Atlanta which is an Academy Award qualifying festival and the Chicago South Asian Film Festival where it picked up a Special Mention for Director Vinay Giridhar for Best Feature Documentary. Emergence: Out of the Shadows was also an official selection at Image+Nation in Montreal, Reelworld Film Festival in Toronto, and was the closing night film at both the South Asian Film Festival of Montreal and the Vancouver International South Asian Film Festival where it picked up Best Documentary. The film was also nominated for three awards at the Vancouver Asian Film Festival including Best Canadian Feature Award, Best Director for Canadian Feature Award, and Best Cinematography for Canadian Feature Award for 2021. Emergence: Out of the Shadows entered the Canadian Screen Awards for Best Feature Documentary and Best Editing for 2022. Emergence: Out of the Shadows had its South Asian Premiere at Reel Desires: Chennai International Queer Film Festival. Emergence: Out of the Shadows also had a double festival premiere at the KASHISH Mumbai International Queer Film Festival and the Mumbai International Film Festival during the same week, where it was in competition at both film festivals for Best Documentary. The film also had an in-person and online screening at the 46th annual Frameline: San Francisco International LGBTQ+ Film Festival which is "the longest-running, largest and most widely recognized LGBTQ+ film exhibition event in the world." In October 2023, Emergence: Out of the Shadows received the Best Feature Film award at the inaugural Langley City Film Festival.

== Expo 2022 ==
In 2019, Sangha and Upkar Tatlay delivered a presentation to Surrey City Council to bring a World Exposition to Surrey to celebrate the diverse cultures and heritage of the city. The Expo would have a focus on South Asian culture since Surrey has one of the largest South Asian diaspora communities outside of South Asia. Over twenty letters of support from stakeholders was provided to endorse the Expo including from Simon Fraser University and Vancity. Mayor Doug McCallum stated that the Expo “shows a lot of promise” and City Council directed staff to prepare an initial report on the proposal.

== Sundar Prize Film Festival ==
The Sundar Prize Film Festival is an international film festival held annually in Surrey, British Columbia, Canada, that celebrates impactful storytelling focused on critical social causes and issues. Founded by Vinay Giridhar and Amar Sangha, the festival aims to recognize and promote films that inspire action and raise awareness on topics such as human rights, social justice, and environmental challenges. The festival is known for its inclusive approach, offering cash prizes, screening fees, and honorariums for volunteers and panelists. In addition to film screenings, the festival hosts panel discussions, networking events, and mentorship programs, fostering a transformative cinematic experience that connects filmmakers with diverse audiences. The Sundar Prize Film Festival is an IMDb qualifying event and a member of the Film Festival Alliance, reflecting its commitment to creating positive social change through the power of film.

== Academic and Community Recognition ==
In addition to his work with Sher Pride, Sangha has been the subject of several features highlighting his role as an advocate for the LGBTQ+ and South Asian communities. In a 2024 article from the University of British Columbia alumni magazine, he was recognized as a "Changemaker" for his use of art and filmmaking as a form of activism to address complex social issues. Another feature from the London School of Economics focused on his efforts to give a voice to "the stories that go unheard," emphasizing the importance of creating safe spaces for dialogue and social change.

== Honours and awards ==
- Meritorious Service Medal from the Governor General of Canada
- BC Community Achievement Award
- Queen Elizabeth II Diamond Jubilee Medal
- 2011 Top 25 Canadian Immigrants Award
- 2023 Mayor's Achievement Award
- King Charles III Coronation Medal
