= Landmark Cinemas =

Canadian cinema chain

Landmark Cinemas Canada LP.
- Company type: Subsidiary
- Industry: Movie theatres
- Founded: May 7, 1965
- Headquarters: Calgary, Alberta
- Number of locations: 36
- Area served: Ontario, Central & Western Canada
- Key people: David Cohen President & Country Manager
- Number of employees: approx. 2500
- Parent: Kinepolis Group
- Subsidiaries: Landmark Cinemas Canada LP
- Website: landmarkcinemas.com

Landmark Cinemas Canada LP. is a Canadian cinema chain. Based in Calgary, Alberta, Landmark operates 36 theatres with 299 screens, primarily in Ontario and western Canada. Its holdings include much of the former Empire Theatres chain which it acquired in late 2013, and some Famous Players locations divested as part of that chain's purchase by Cineplex Entertainment. Landmark is the second-largest cinema chain in Canada after Cineplex. It was acquired by Belgian company Kinepolis in 2017 for $123 million.

== History ==
Landmark Cinemas is the umbrella name originally covering the holdings of Towne Cinemas, Rokemay Cinemas, and occasionally May Theatres. It was adopted in 1974 after the purchase of Rothstein Theatres, which was the first big expansion for the company, adding about 15 locations (some closed immediately or sold and were never operated by Landmark).

Another expansion took place in 1984, when it purchased most of the Alberta and British Columbia assets of Canadian Odeon Theatres as a part of that chain's merger into Cineplex Odeon Corporation, which is now known as Cineplex Entertainment.

In late 2013, Landmark Cinemas announced the purchase of 23 theatres in Ontario and Western Canada from Empire Theatres. It later added the Kanata and Whitby locations that were to be sold to Cineplex Entertainment, plus Ottawa's World Exchange Plaza. This transaction made Landmark the second-largest cinema chain in Canada with 54 locations and 359 screens. The sale also included five IMAX screens, one in Calgary, Alberta, and four in Ontario. Empire promotional offers such as Reel Deal Tuesdays and University/College Student Combo were carried over by Landmark, but only some locations offer these discounts.

Empire Theatres in Ontario and Western Canada closed on October 31, 2013, after the evening shows which also closed Empire Theatres permanently. The sale closed on October 31, 2013, and on November 1, 2013, the theatres reopened as Landmark Cinemas. Branding name changes occurred in late 2013 at the former Empire Theatres locations. Landmark Cinemas operated the World Exchange Plaza theatre on a management contract from November 1 to December 31, 2013, after which its lease expired.

In September 2017, Landmark announced its sale to the Belgian exhibitor Kinepolis for $123 million, pending regulatory approval. On December 8, 2017, Landmark announced the completion of the sale to Kinepolis Group.

== Operations ==
=== Seating ===
Selected locations offer auditoriums with free reserved seating with leather recliners (promoted under the slogan "Reserve, Recline, Relax"), which were manufactured by the Winnipeg-based Palliser Furniture. Selected locations also offer auditoriums with a row of "Premiere Seats" for an additional fee. These are sets of two or three seats each that include privacy screens, coat hooks, side tables, adjustable headrests, and heating.

=== Premium screens ===
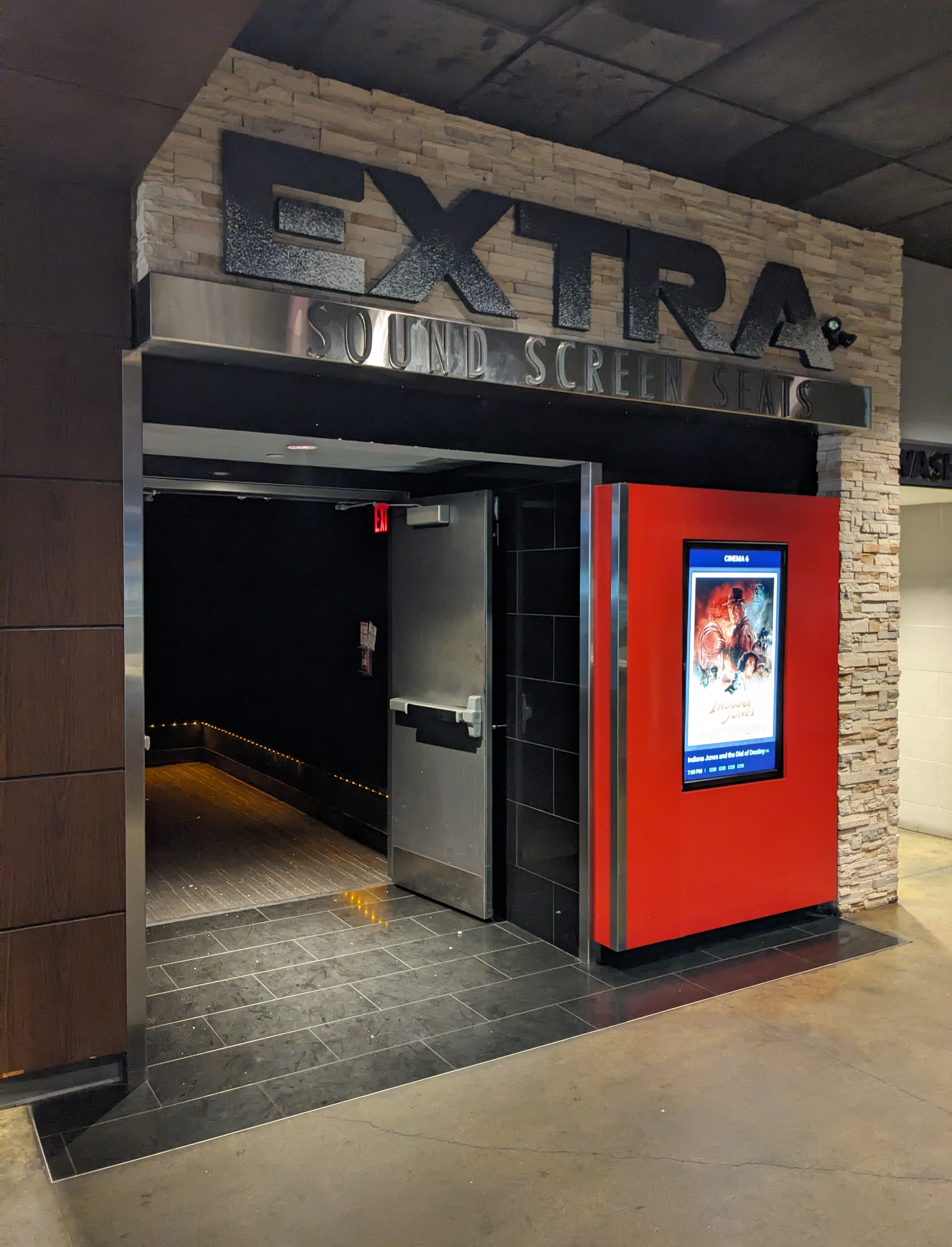
Extra Experience entrance at Landmark Cinemas Orleans

Landmark Cinemas features several premium large format screens. These require an additional cost compared to a regular admission and offer reserved seating.

- IMAX digital screens are available at five locations. One is in Calgary, Alberta (Country Hills), and four are in Ontario at the Kingston, Waterloo, Kanata, and Whitby locations. All of these were previously owned by Empire Theatres and, with the exception of Kingston, were in turn previously owned by AMC Theatres (Kanata and Whitby) or Famous Players (SilverCity in Calgary). In 2023, as part of an agreement with Kinepolis, it was announced that the locations would be upgraded to IMAX with Laser
- Extra Experience is a premium large format available at two locations. Extra theatres use a Barco 2K projector, a custom-designed 7.1 surround sound system and faux leather seats. It was introduced as Empire Extra at the Waterloo location on November 19, 2010, and at the Calgary (Shawnessy) and Ottawa (Orleans) locations following an announcement on May 16, 2011. Landmark opened an Extra auditorium in Winnipeg in May 2015. Landmark has replaced two former Extra auditoriums with Laser Ultra, including Shawnessy in 2021 and Waterloo in 2023.
- Xtreme is a premium large format at the West Kelowna location; it is similar to Extra Experience, but uses Dolby Atmos instead of 7.1 surround sound.
- Laser Ultra is Kinepolis's premium large format, which uses a Barco laser projector and Dolby Atmos. It first opened at the Shawnessy, Calgary location in 2019.

== Locations ==
Theatre name	City	Format	Former Owner/Opened	Premium Large Format
=== Alberta ===
Country Hills	Calgary	SilverCity	Famous Players, Empire Theatres	Digital IMAX, Laser Ultra
Market Mall	Calgary	Stadium	Opened December 19, 2019	Laser Ultra
Shawnessy	Calgary	Coliseum	Famous Players, Empire Theatres	Laser Ultra
Cardium	Drayton Valley	Traditional	Irvin Janzen	
City Centre	Edmonton	Traditional	Cineplex Odeon, Empire Theatres	—N/a
Tamarack	Edmonton	Stadium	Opened June 10, 2021	Laser Ultra
Nova	Edson	Traditional	T. Fowler	
Eagle Ridge	Fort McMurray	Traditional	Opened November 9, 2018	Laser Ultra
Spruce Grove	Spruce Grove	Traditional	Magic Lantern Theatres, Empire Theatres	—N/a
St. Albert	St. Albert	Traditional	Opened February 15, 2018	Laser Ultra
Sylvan Lake	Sylvan Lake	Traditional	?	—N/a
=== British Columbia ===
Rialto	Courtenay	Traditional	?	—N/a
Columbia	Cranbrook	Traditional	?	—N/a
Aurora Cinema Centre	Fort St. John	Traditional	?	—N/a
Grand 10	Kelowna	Stadium	Caprice Showcase Theatres	—N/a
Avalon Cinema Centre	Nanaimo	Stadium	?	—N/a
Landmark 10	New Westminster	Stadium	Built by Landmark	Laser Ultra
Landmark 7	Penticton	Stadium	Built by Landmark	—N/a
Guildford	Surrey	SilverCity	National General Cinemas, Famous Players, Empire Theatres	—N/a
Capitol Encore	West Kelowna	Traditional	Caprice Showcase Theatres	—N/a
Landmark 8 & Xtreme	West Kelowna	Stadium	Built by Landmark	Landmark Xtreme
=== Manitoba ===
Capitol 9	Brandon	Stadium	Empire Theatres	Laser Ultra
Southland 5	Winkler	Traditional	Magic Lantern Theatres	
Grant Park 8	Winnipeg	Stadium	National General Cinemas, Cineplex Odeon, Empire Theatres	—N/a
=== Ontario ===
Bolton	Bolton	Contemporary	Empire Theatres	—N/a
Jackson Square	Hamilton	Contemporary	Famous Players, Empire Theatres	—N/a
Kingston	Kingston	Contemporary	Empire Theatres	Digital IMAX
Kanata	Ottawa	AMC Theatres	AMC Theatres, Empire Theatres	Digital IMAX, Laser Ultra
London	London	Traditional	Famous Players, Empire Theatres	—N/a
Orleans	Ottawa	Contemporary	Empire Theatres	Extra Experience
Pen Centre	St. Catharines	SilverCity	Famous Players, Empire Theatres	Laser Ultra
Waterloo	Waterloo	Contemporary	Empire Theatres	Extra Experience, Digital IMAX
Whitby	Whitby	AMC Theatres	AMC Theatres, Empire Theatres	Digital IMAX
Windsor	Windsor	SilverCity	Famous Players, Cineplex	Laser Ultra
=== Saskatchewan ===
Aurora	Regina	Stadium	Opened October 2019	Laser Ultra
Brighton Gate	Saskatoon	Stadium	Opened June 2018	Laser Ultra

=== Former theatres ===
Alberta

- Roxy, Airdrie
- Gaiety Theatre, Grande Prairie (R. Norton)
- Globe Cinema, Calgary (Famous Players, Empire)
- Jan Cinema, Grande Prairie (R. Norton)
- Jasper Cinema Centre, Edmonton
- Landmark Cinemas 10 Clareview, Edmonton (Cineplex, Empire)
- Paramount Theatre, Edmonton (Famous Players)
- Lux Cinema, Banff
- Lyric Theatre, Grande Prairie
- Prairie Cinema Centre, Grande Prairie
- Towne Cinema Centre, Edmonton
- Wapiti Drive-In, Grande Prairie (George Repka)
- Landmark Six, Fort McMurray (May Theatres)
- Oasis, Brooks

British Columbia

- Armond Theatre, Cranbrook (J. Purnell, Famous Players)
- Bay Theatre, Nanaimo (Famous Players)
- Caprice Showcase Theatres, Campbell River
- Coronet Theatre, Prince George (Famous Players)
- Centre Cinema, Dawson Creek
- Crest Theatre, Dawson Creek Northland Theatres Ltd.
- Esplanade, North Vancouver (Famous Players, Empire)
- Galaxy Theatre, Campbell River
- Grand 6 Cinemas, Abbotsford (Cineplex)
- Lido Theatre, Fort St. John (C. Brooks)
- Mission Theatre, Mission (Victory Theatres Ltd.)
- Paramount Theatre, Chilliwack (Famous Players)
- Paramount Theatre, Kamloops (Famous Players)
- Paramount Theatre, Kelowna (Famous Players)
- Paramount Theatre, Port Alberni (Famous Players)
- Penmar Cinema Centre, Penticton (PenMar Theatre Ltd)
- Royal Theatre, Trail (Cineplex)
- Towne Cinema, Vernon (Famous Players)
- Towne Cinema Centre
- Vic Theatre, Victoria
- Westbank Drive-In, West Kelowna

Manitoba

- Garry, Selkirk (Rothstein)
- Globe Cinema, Winnipeg (Famous Players, Empire)
- Towne 8, Winnipeg (Cineplex)

Ontario

- Kitchener (Famous Players SilverCity, Empire Theatres)
- Square One, Mississauga (Cineplex, Empire)
- World Exchange Plaza, Ottawa (Cineplex, Empire)

Saskatchewan

- C & H Drive-In, Lloydminster (May Theatres)
- Cinema 6 Drive-In, Regina (Rothstein)
- Roxy Theatre, Saskatoon (Rothstein)
- Soo Theatre, Weyburn (Rothstein)
- Tower, Yorkton (Rothstein)

Yukon

- Qwanlin Mall, Whitehorse
- Yukon Cinema Centre, Whitehorse
