= Timeline of the 2020 Canadian pipeline and railway protests =

Widespread protests in Canada in 2020

The following is a timeline of the 2020 Canadian pipeline and railway protests which originated with the opposition by the hereditary chiefs of the Wetʼsuwetʼen people in British Columbia (BC), Canada to the Coastal GasLink Pipeline project.

== January ==
Local elected councils vote in favour of building the pipeline.

- January 5, 2020 - Anarchist website North Shore Counter Info releases a callout against rail infrastructure: "To Settlers, by Settlers" which includes instructions and tips for sabotage in solidarity with the Wet'suwet'en.
- January 7 - The UN Committee on the Elimination of Racial Discrimination calls on Canada to immediately stop the construction of the Coastal GasLink (CGL) and Trans Mountain pipelines and the Site C dam.
- January 7 - Individuals sabotage three junctions in Hamilton, Ontario shutting down all rail traffic in and out of the city.
- January 8 - Protestors in Hamilton, Ontario block a main road and rail crossing in solidarity with the Wet'suwet'en.
- January 11 - BC Human Rights Commissioner Kasari Govender calls for a halt to the CGL pipeline until the affected Indigenous groups consent to the construction.
- January 16 - UN committee chair Noureddine Amir admits to media that he was unaware that the CGL had broad Indigenous backing other than the Wet'suwet'en.
- January 16 - Karen Ogen-Toews, chair of the First Nations LNG Alliance and former Wetʼsuwetʼen elected chief, writes an open letter to the UN asking for a retraction and immediate apology to the 20 First Nations who are in favour of the project.
- January 20 – Protesters disrupt BC ferry service leaving from Swartz Bay ferry terminal, which is Victoria's main ferry link to the BC mainland.
- January 23 - Individuals sabotage a rail junction box in Burlington, ON.
- January 27 - BC Minister of Public Safety and Solicitor General Mike Farnworth declares a provincial emergency under the Provincial Police Service Agreement and authorizes the Royal Canadian Mounted Police (RCMP) to redeploy resources to use in the enforcement of the injunction in a letter to the RCMP Deputy Commissioner.
- January 30 – The RCMP announces that they would stand down while the hereditary chiefs and the province meet to discuss and try to come to an agreement.

== February ==
- February 1 - The Office of the Hereditary Chiefs of the Wetʼsuwetʼen give an "eviction notice" to the Coastal GasLink Pipeline construction camp.
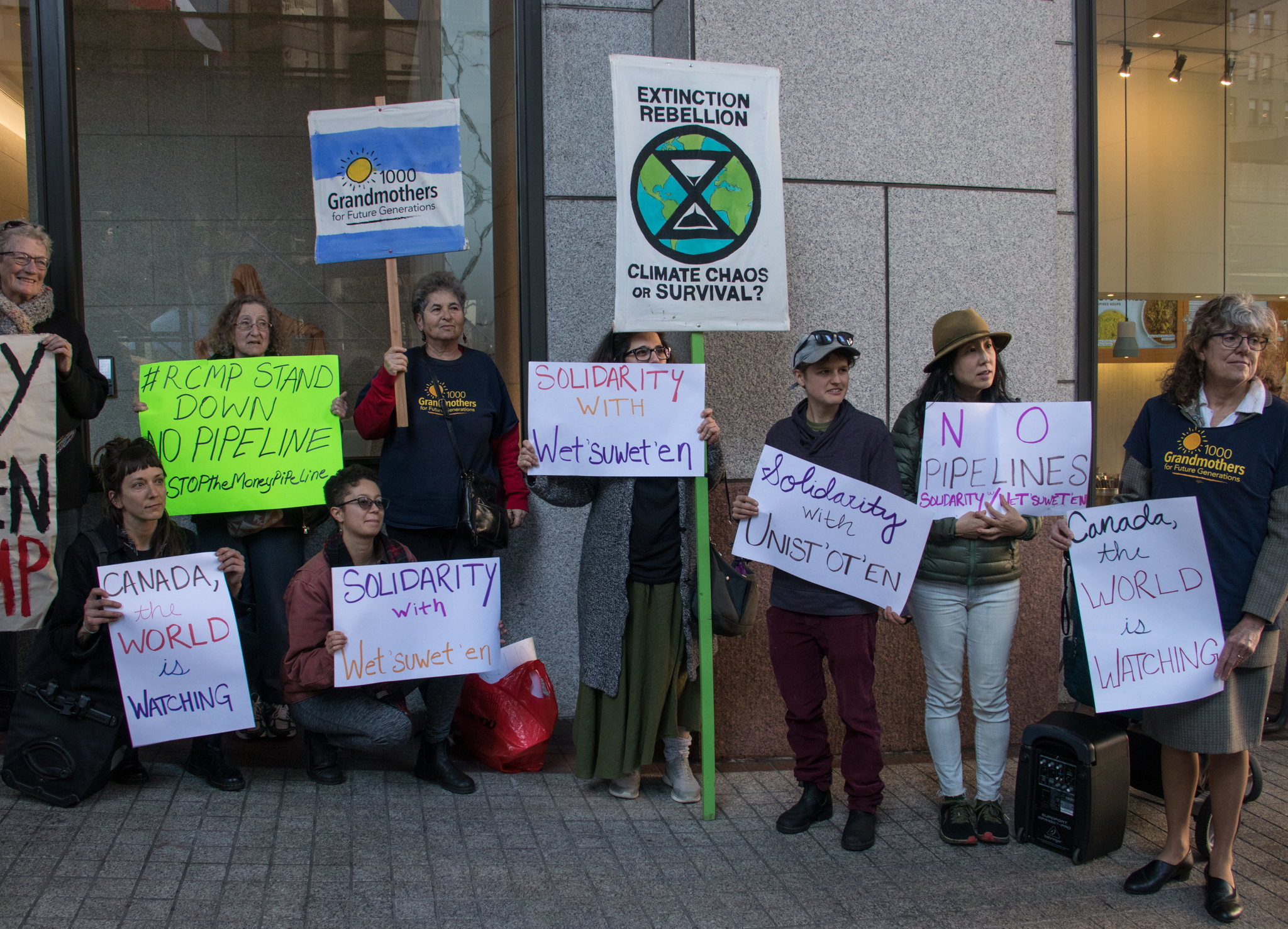
  A solidarity rally at the Canadian consulate in San Francisco, California on February 7, 2020
- February 3 – The Office of the Wetʼsuwetʼen asks for a judicial review of the environmental approval for the pipeline.
- February 4 – The hereditary chiefs and the Government of British Columbia issue statements that talks had broken down.
- February 6 – The RCMP begins enforcing the injunction, arresting 21 persons at camps along the route between February 6 and 9.
- February 6 – Near Belleville, Ontario, members of the Mohawks of the Bay of Quinte First Nation begin a blockade of the Canadian National Railway rail line just north of Tyendinaga Mohawk Territory. The line is critical to the CNR network in Eastern Canada as CNR has no other east–west rail lines through Eastern Ontario.
- February 6 – Via Rail cancels trains on their Toronto–Montreal and Toronto-Ottawa routes. Until February 13, Via Rail announces passenger train cancellations on a day-to-day basis.
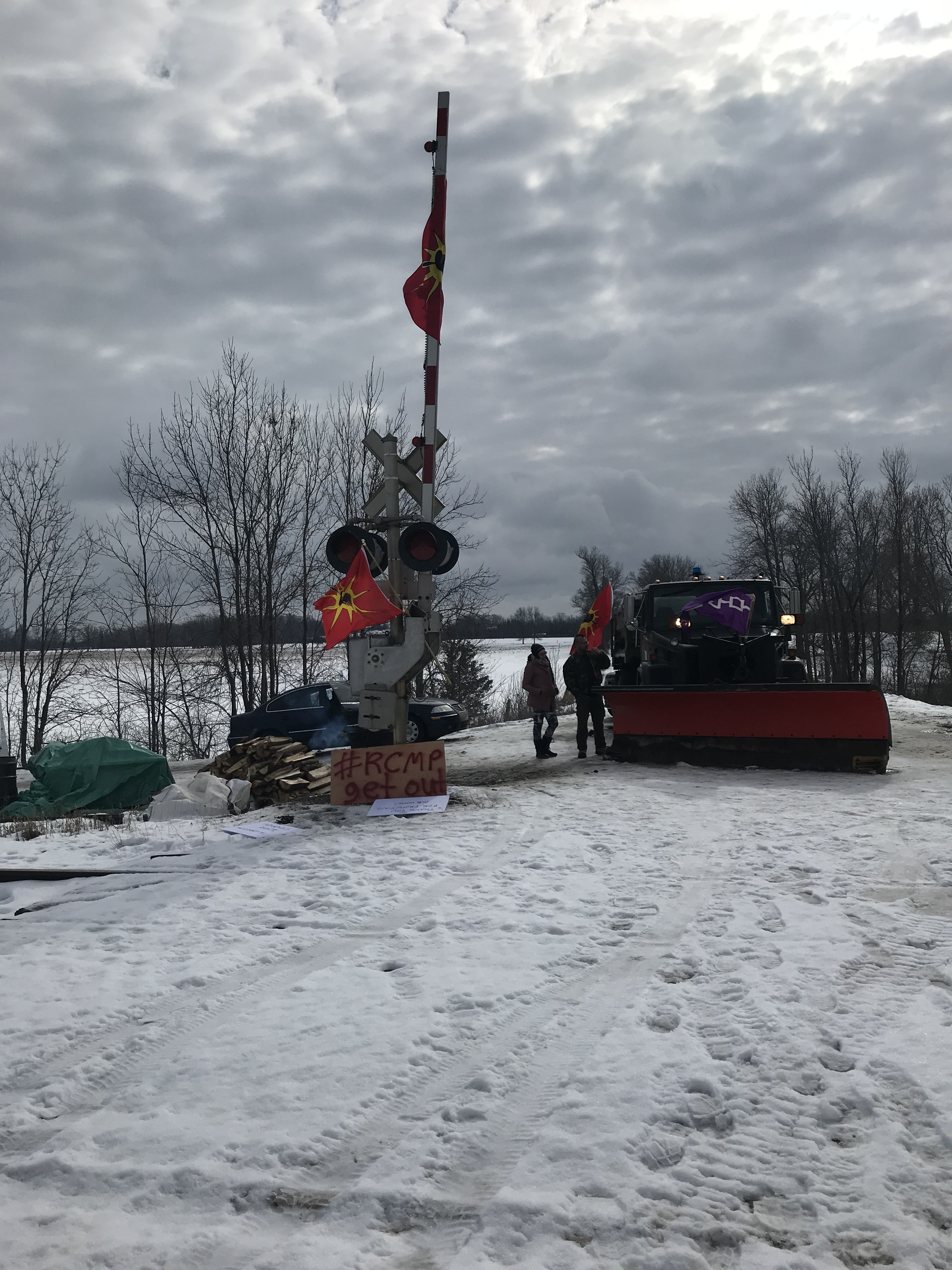
  Mohawk protesters at the Tyendinaga blockade on February 10
- February 8 – Solidarity protests take place in Toronto and Ottawa.
- February 8 - A blockade of the Exo Candiac line south of Montreal in Kahnawake begins.
- February 9-10 - Individuals set fire to a rail junction box in Hamilton, ON and Guelph, ON.
- February 10 – Solidarity rallies take place in Nelson, Calgary, Regina, Winnipeg, Sherbrooke, and Halifax.
- February 10 – Metro Vancouver police arrest 47 persons blocking the Port of Vancouver, Deltaport, and two other ports in Metro Vancouver.
- February 10 – A blockade goes up on the CNR line west of Winnipeg blocking the trans-Canada passenger rail route.
- February 10 – The Société de chemin de fer de la Gaspésie (SCFG) freight railway between Gaspé and Matapédia, Quebec is blockaded by members of the Listuguj Miꞌgmaq First Nation.
- February 11 – Prince George–Prince Rupert passenger rail service is suspended.
- February 11 – The RCMP announces that the road to the construction site was cleared and TC Energy announced that work would resume the following Monday.
- February 11 – A solidarity rally surrounds the BC Legislature in Victoria, preventing the traditional ceremonies around the reading of the Throne Speech by the Lieutenant Governor. Members of the legislature had to have police assistance to enter or used back or side entrances.
- February 12 - The Wet’suwet’en hereditary chiefs petition the Supreme Court of Canada to declare "Canada has a constitutional duty to keep the country’s greenhouse gas emissions within the Paris Agreement limit."
- February 13 – CNR shuts down its rail lines east of Toronto.
- February 13 – Via Rail announces the shutdown of its entire network, with the exception of the Sudbury–White River train line and the Winnipeg–Churchill train between Churchill and The Pas, until further notice.
- February 14 – BC Ferries obtains a preemptive injunction to prevent anticipated future demonstrations from blocking Vancouver-Victoria ferry service.
- February 15 – The rail blockade of Prince Rupert is lifted.
- February 15 - Over 200 people block Macmillan Yard - the second largest railyard in Canada - in solidarity
- February 15 – Indigenous Services Minister Marc Miller meets the Mohawks in a ceremonial encounter on the CNR train tracks to renew a 17th Century treaty between the Iroquois and the British Crown known as the Silver Covenant Chain. Miller and the leaders of Tyendinaga then discussed the blockade. Miller asked for a temporary drawback of the protest but his request was refused after Wetʼsuwetʼen hereditary Chief Woos, who was on the phone, stated that the RCMP was still on his territory and "they are out there with guns, threatening us." Leaked audio of the meetings included a Mohawk resident in the meeting telling the minister to "Get the red coats out first, get the blue coats out … then we can maybe have some common discussions".
- February 16 – A demonstration temporarily blocks the Rainbow Bridge border crossing in Niagara Falls, Ontario.
- February 17 – A demonstration temporarily blocks the Thousand Islands Bridge border crossing in Ivy Lea, Ontario.
- February 18 – CNR temporarily lays off 450 employees for reasons related to the pipeline disruptions (they are recalled March 3).
- February 18 – Opposition leader Andrew Scheer condemns the federal government's response, calling it "the weakest response to a national crisis in Canadian history. Will our country be one of the rule of the law, or will our country be one of the rule of the mob?". Prime Minister Justin Trudeau holds a private meeting with the other opposition parties' leaders, barring Scheer after his comments.
- February 18 – The Assembly of First Nations (AFN) holds a press conference in Ottawa. AFN National Chief Perry Bellegarde called for all parties to engage in dialogue. "It's on everybody. It's not on any one individual. I'm just calling on all the parties to come together, get this dialogue started in a constructive way."
- February 19 – A blockade is set up on the Mont-Saint-Hilaire rail line in Saint-Lambert, Quebec, promising to stay until the RCMP leaves the disputed zone in Wetʼsuwetʼen territory. The blockade caused Via Rail to postpone resuming service between Montreal and Quebec City.
- February 19 - Individuals sabotage a rail line in Toronto, ON.
- February 19 – A group of about 20 members of a group calling itself the "Cuzzins for Wet’suwet’en" erects a blockade on a CN rail line in west Edmonton. CN obtains a court injunction, and less than twelve hours after the blockade began, it was dismantled by counter-protesters after a CN legal representative arrived to serve the injunction.
- February 19 – Via Rail announces temporary layoffs of up to 1,000 people due to the blockades.
- February 20 – The RCMP offers to close its Community Industry Security Office (CISO) on the Morice Road.
- February 20 – Another blockade of CPR tracks springs up between Kamloops and Chase in British Columbia. The protesters left voluntarily on February 21, after the RCMP offered to leave the Wet’suwet’en land. The group vowed to return in four days if a dialogue was not started between the prime minister and the hereditary chiefs.
- February 20 - The Civilian Review and Complaints Commission (CRCC) for the RCMP issues a letter critical of RCMP procedures in the "checkpoint and exclusion zone" implemented on the Morice West Forest Service Road, stating the RCMP went beyond its legal authority to do ID checks of activists and searches of activists' vehicles.
- February 20 - Wetsuweten hereditary matriarch Rita George speaks out against the protests, saying they were not supported by the matriarchs and that the protesters are not following ancestral ways.
- February 21 – The Mont-Saint-Hilaire rail line is cleared after the Sûreté du Québec police arrive to enforce a CNR injunction.
- February 21 – Prime Minister Trudeau calls for the barricades to come down.
- February 21 – The British Columbia Environmental Assessment Office (EAO) served notice that Coastal GasLink must halt construction on that segment and enter into talks with the Wetʼsuwetʼen over the next 30 days.
- February 21 – Wetʼsuwetʼen supporters block CNR rail lines near Moncton, New Brunswick.
- February 22 – After the hereditary chiefs made it a condition for talks with the federal government, the RCMP closes their CISO onsite office and moves to their detachment in Houston.
- February 22 - Anarchists in Hamilton, ON release a statement promising to blockade rails if the OPP clear the Tyendinaga blockade.
- February 23 – Mohawks at the Tyendinaga rail blockade are given notice by the OPP to clear their blockade by midnight to avoid prosecution for disobeying the injunction against the blockade.
- February 24 – The Tyendinaga Mohawks do not vacate the site. The OPP removes the blockade, arresting several of the protesters.
- February 24 – Immediately following the police action, new protests spring up in the province of Quebec, including a temporary rolling blockade of the Honoré Mercier Bridge near Montreal by Mohawks from Kahnawake, a new rail blockade by the Listuguj Mi'gmaq in the Gaspé Peninsula, and a barricade of Route 344 which was the site of the 1990 Oka Crisis.
- February 24 – Rail blockades come down in New Brunswick after being served with an injunction.
- February 24 – New protests form in British Columbia, blocking the BC Legislature, the Port of Vancouver and rail lines in Hazelton and Kamloops. In Hazleton, 14 protesters, including three Gitxsan hereditary chiefs, are arrested. They are released overnight.
- February 24 - In a statement signed and supported by over 200 Canadian lawyers, Beverly Jacobs and Sylvia McAdam of the University of Windsor, Alex Neve of Amnesty International, and Harsha Walia of the BC Civil Liberties Association state that is the Canadian governments that are breaking international law, not the Wetsuweten hereditary chiefs and call for an end to the violation of indigenous persons' right to free, prior and informed consent.
- February 24 – Members of the Mohawk Nation (Bear Clan) from the Six Nations of the Grand River First Nation block Ontario Highway 6 in Caledonia in solidarity with the Wetʼsuwetʼen.
- February 25 – Members of the Six Nations of the Grand River First Nation set up a rail blockade west of Toronto in Hamilton, causing the cancellation of Via Rail and GO Transit service between Aldershot and Niagara Falls stations. Metrolinx replaced Lakeshore West line rail service with shuttle buses.
- February 25 - A demonstration blocks commuter rail lines in Toronto, causing suspension of GO train service for several hours. Several protesters are arrested.
- February 25 - In Kanesatake, the blockade is reduced on Highway 344, allowing only a single lane of traffic through the territory.
- February 25 - Polling firm Ipsos releases a poll indicating that 63% of Canadians support the "intervention by police to end the blocking of key transportation corridors", while only 26% oppose police action. Additionally, 60% of Canadians are against the blockades, while 27% are in favour.
- February 26 - A meeting between Wetʼsuwetʼen hereditary chiefs and the BC and federal governments is cancelled, then rescheduled for February 27.
- February 27 - A few dozen activists, protesting the pipeline and the OPP actions, block rail lines in Kingston, Ontario for several hours.
- February 27 - TC Energy agrees to pause construction and the RCMP stops patrolling the Morice Forest Service Road to address the Wetʼsuwetʼen hereditary chiefs' preconditions for talks with government ministers.
- February 27 - Canadian Crown-Indigenous Relations and Northern Development Minister Carolyn Bennett and B.C. Indigenous Relations Minister Scott Fraser arrive in Smithers, British Columbia begin two days of talks with the Wet’suwet’en hereditary chiefs.
- February 28 - Wetʼsuwetʼen matriarchs join the meetings, demanding representation from all of the Wetʼsuwetʼen people.

== March ==
- March 1 - After extending talks to three days, an agreement on land rights is reached, in the form of a Memorandum of Understanding (MOU). It is to be presented to the Wetʼsuwetʼen Nation for ratification.
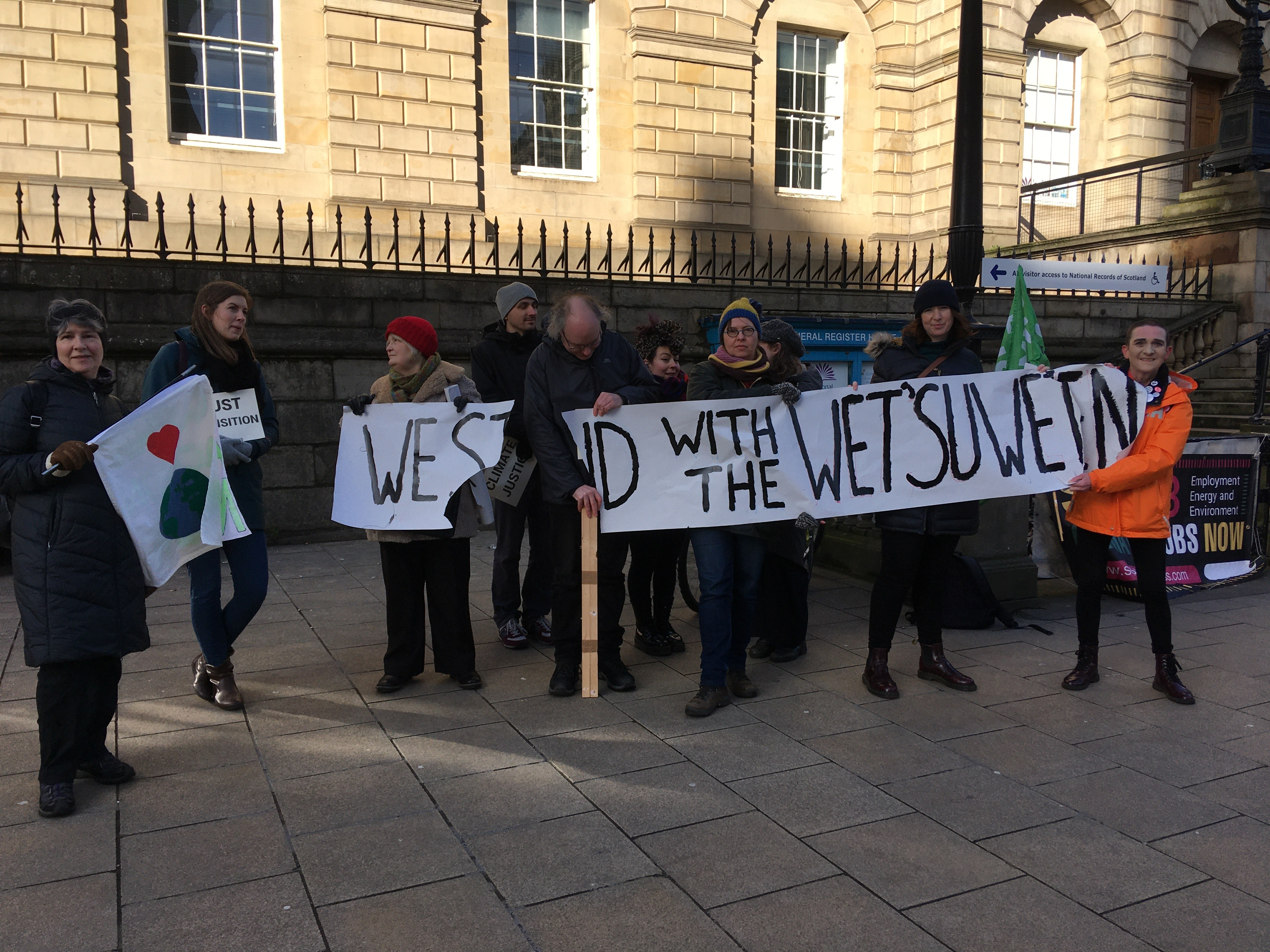
  Wetʼsuwetʼen solidarity event in Scotland on March 1
- March 2 - RCMP patrols resume and CGL construction work resumes.
- March 2 - A CNR rail bridge in Pointe-St-Charles, Quebec is blocked for several hours by protesters, who leave peacefully.
- March 3 - Via Rail resumes service on their Toronto–Montreal and Toronto–Ottawa lines.
- March 3 - CNR recalls the 450 workers it had temporarily laid off on February 18.
- March 3 - A meeting is held at the Centennial Hall in Witset among the Laksilyu (Small Frog Clan), to discuss the tentative agreement reached between the hereditary chiefs and the representatives of the Canadian government. The meeting's attendees agree to the proposal on the spot.
- March 4 - University students at several universities across Canada walkout and hold protests in support of the Wet’suwet’en.
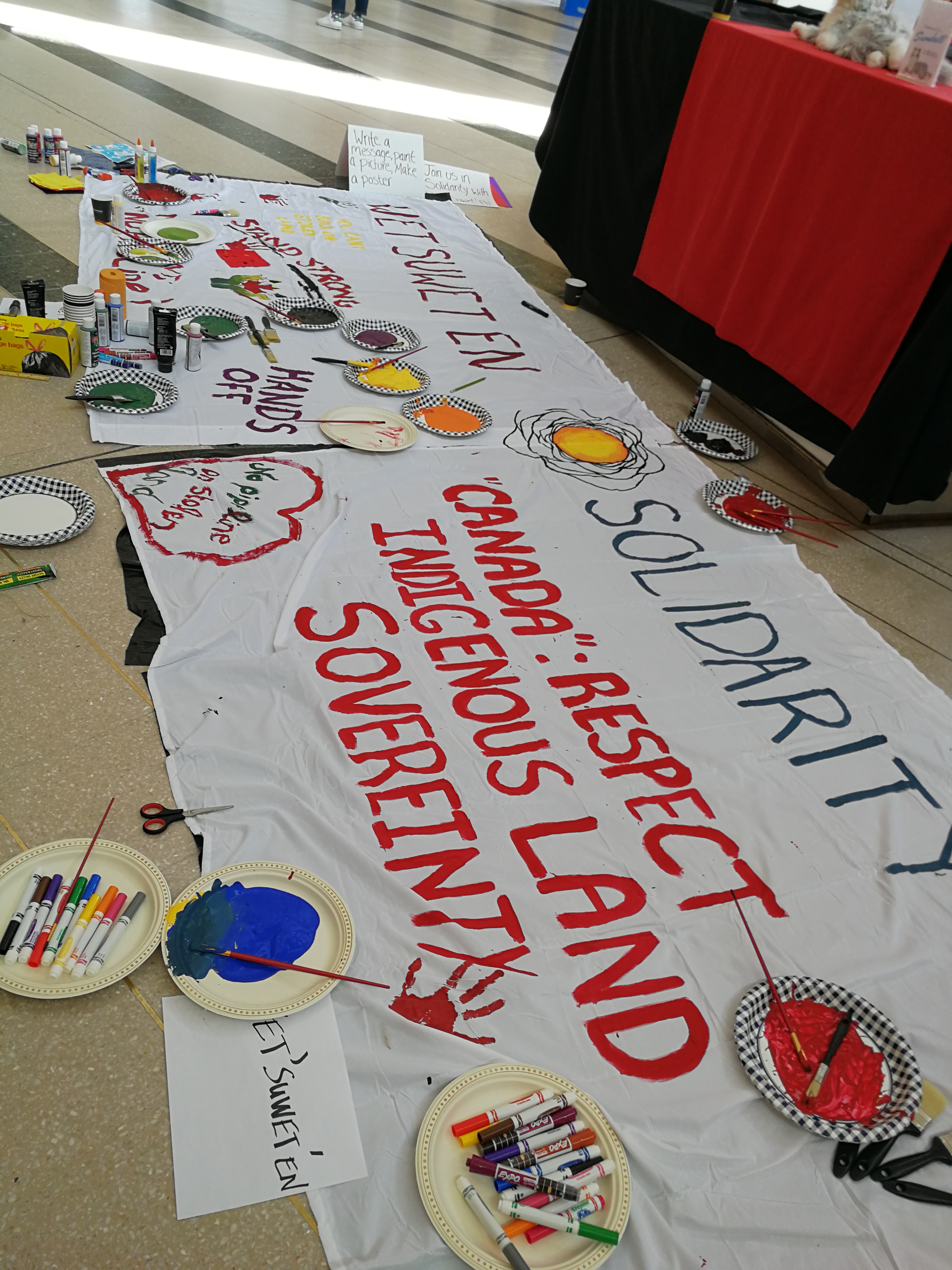
  Banner created by participants of a Wet'suwet'en Solidarity event at Vari Hall, York University in Toronto, March 11, 2020
- March 4 - The Canadian, Via Rail's Toronto-Vancouver train, resumes partial service, as Via announces it is recalling most of the 1,000 employees "affected by temporary suspensions" starting on February 19.
- March 5 - The Mohawks of Kahnawake and the Listiguj First Nation dismantle their rail blockades in Quebec.
- March 5 - Five indigenous youth from the protest at the B.C. Legislature (which had begun February 11) are arrested, and the protest is dismantled.
- March 6 - The BC Civil Liberties Association and the Wet’suwet’en release a letter written by BC Minister Farnworth authorizing a redeployment of RCMP resources to support the injunction enforcement. In the BCCLA's opinion, the letter contradicts his later statement that the government does not direct the RCMP's activities.
- March 7 - Via Rail service has resumed on most routes, after disruption to more than 1,070 trips and roughly 165,000 passengers, according to Via Rail. Via Rail subsequently suspends The Canadian and Ocean services and reduces the frequency on the Winnipeg-Churchill route due to the COVID-19 pandemic, some time after the reinstatement announcement is made.
- March 8 - The Tsayu (Beaver Clan) hold a meeting at the Centennial Hall in Witset to discuss the tentative agreement reached on March 1.
- March 10 - Speaking about the blockade on Highway 6 near Six Nations of the Grand River (begun February 24), Haldimand—Norfolk MPP Toby Barrett calls on anyone who can help to "tear down this blockade", citing the fact that businesses in the area are suffering.
- March 13 - Canada's Parliamentary Budget Officer Yves Giroux releases a report stating that the protests would have very little impact on economic growth, estimating that the impact would amount to a 0.01% fall in GDP, which he characterized as "a blip", and saying earlier warnings of shortages and economic downturn by corporations was "overblown".
- March 17 - The planned Wetʼsuwetʼen all-clans meeting is postponed indefinitely amid a variety of concerns, including the COVID-19 pandemic and a death in the community (unrelated to COVID-19).
- March 19 - The blockade on Highway 6 near Six Nations of the Grand River is removed after protesters and Six Nations chief Mark Hill come together and decide to leave the road and move back to Douglas Creek estates, known in the Mohawk language as Kanonhstaton "the protected place", a site which had been a focal point for the long-standing Grand River land dispute. In a statement issued by the protesters, they say their departure is done "as a sign of good faith".
- March 20 - The OPP West Region says they are working with the Ministry of Transportation of Ontario (MTO) to remove concrete barriers they had set up around the protest.
- March 21 - The OPP West Region tweets that Highway 6 is expected to re-open over the (March 21–22) weekend.
- March 21 - Pipeline opponents on social media launch a letter-writing campaign urging Coastal GasLink to suspend construction on Wetʼsuwetʼen territory, citing the heightened risk posed to the inhabitants of the territory by transient workers continuing operations amidst the COVID-19 pandemic.

== April ==
- April 30 - The hereditary chiefs release a joint statement with the provincial and federal governments, stating that all five clans had agreed to ratify the MOU after having reviewed and discussed it in the prior weeks.

== May ==
- May 1 - The elected chiefs of five Wet’suwet’en band governments (Nee Tahi Buhn Indian Band, Skin Tyee Nation, Ts’il Kaz Koh First Nation, Wet’suwet’en First Nation, and Witset First Nation) release their own joint statement, calling on the MOU to be withdrawn, saying they weren't consulted properly.
- May 7 - The MOU is released to the elected band councils.
- May 8 - The MOU is released to the wider Wet’suwet’en Nation.
- May 11 - The elected chiefs of Nee Tahi Buhn Indian Band, Skin Tyee Nation, Ts’il Kaz Koh First Nation, and Wet’suwet’en First Nation release a further statement, again calling on the MOU to be withdrawn, and further calling for the resignation of Minister Bennett.
- May 12 - The MOU is published on the Office of the Wet’suwet’en website.
- May 14 - The MOU is signed by the nine sitting hereditary chiefs, Minister Bennett, and Minister Fraser, in a virtual ceremony held via Zoom due to precautions related to the COVID-19 pandemic.

== June ==
- June 5 - The BC Prosecution Service and Coastal GasLink issue statements saying that criminal and civil contempt charges will not be pursued against 22 protesters arrested on Wet’suwet’en territory in February.

== September ==
- September 21 - The suspensions of more than 200 Facebook accounts that had shared information about a May 7 online solidarity rally are lifted. The accounts had been suspended for unknown reasons.

== October ==
- October 1 - A hearing at the B.C. Supreme Court begins, with the Office of the Wet’suwet’en seeking a rejection of the province's decision to extend Coastal GasLink's environmental certificate for another five years. In their arguments, they cite the danger in establishing work camps on Indigenous territory, attested to in the Final report on Missing and murdered Indigenous women, which was published in June 2019 and not meaningfully considered when the decision was made. They also cite the company's four-year history of non-compliance with the Environmental Assessment Office's legally-binding conditions. They are desiring that additional conditions be imposed on the certificate as part of its extension. The Environmental Assessment Office's position is that it already has the power to impose further conditions outside of an extension, and that revoking the certificate would leave the project in a "vacuum" since the last certificate expired in October 2019.
- October 2 - Lawyers for Coastal GasLink appear briefly at the continuing hearing, but court is adjourned before they can present all their points.
- October 16 - The Supreme Court hearing is scheduled to resume on this date.
