= 2020 Canadian pipeline and railway protests =

Protests in Canada

2020 Canadian pipeline protests
- Part of indigenous specific land claims in Canada
- Date: 7 January – March 2020
- Location: Canada
- Caused by: Coastal GasLink Pipeline
- Result: Nation-wide blockades removed; memorandum of understanding signed; Coastal GasLink Pipeline construction ongoing; opposition to construction ongoing primarily on Wetʼsuwetʼen territory

Parties
Anti-pipeline protesters: Office of the Wetʼsuwetʼen; Union of British Columbia Indian Chiefs; Listuguj Miꞌgmaq; Kahnawake; Mohawks of the Bay of Quinte; Six Nations of the Grand River	Government and police: Department of Crown-Indigenous Relations; Executive Council of British Columbia; Royal Canadian Mounted Police; Ontario Provincial Police; Sûreté du Québec	Counter-protesters: Local activists; First Nations LNG Alliance

Lead figures
Na’Moks (John Ridsdale); Smogelgem (Warner Naziel); Freda Huson; Sleydoʼ (Molly Wickham)	Justin Trudeau; Bill Blair; Carolyn Bennett; Marc Miller; John Horgan; François Legault	Dan George; Crystal Smith

Casualties and losses
Several arrested		

From January to March 2020, a series of civil disobedience protests were held in Canada over the construction of the Coastal GasLink Pipeline (CGL) through 190 kilometres (120 mi) of Wetʼsuwetʼen First Nation territory in British Columbia (BC), including land that is not covered by historical treaties and subject to ongoing comprehensive land claims. Concerns of the protesters included Indigenous land rights, the actions of police, land conservation, and the environmental impact of energy projects on climate change.

Starting in 2010, the Wetʼsuwetʼen hereditary chiefs and their supporters made their opposition to the project known and set up a camp directly in the path of the Enbridge Northern Gateway Pipelines, a path similar to that which would later be proposed for the Coastal GasLink Pipeline. Northern Gateway was officially rejected in 2016, but the CGL project moved through planning, indigenous consultations, environmental reviews and governmental reviews before being approved in 2015. However, the approval of all the Wetʼsuwetʼen hereditary chiefs was never granted. In 2018, the backers of the pipeline project gave the go-ahead to the CA$6.6 billion project and it began construction. Access to the Coastal GasLink Pipeline construction camps in Wetʼsuwetʼen territory was blocked and the Coastal GasLink project was granted an injunction in 2018 to remove the land defenders. In January 2019, the Royal Canadian Mounted Police (RCMP) of British Columbia removed the blockades and CGL pre-construction work in the territory was completed. Subsequently, the blockades were rebuilt and Coastal GasLink was granted a second injunction by the BC Supreme Court in December 2019 to allow construction.

In February 2020, after the RCMP enforced the second court injunction, removing the Wetʼsuwetʼen blockades and arresting Wetʼsuwetʼen land defenders, solidarity protests sprang up across Canada. Many were rail blockades, including one blockade near Tyendinaga Mohawk Territory which halted traffic along a major Canadian National Railway (CNR) line between Toronto and Montreal and led to a shutdown of passenger rail service and rail freight operations in much of Canada. The Eastern Ontario blockade was itself removed by the Ontario Provincial Police. Blockades and protests continued through March in BC, Ontario and Quebec. Discussions between representatives of the Wetʼsuwetʼen and the governments of Canada and British Columbia have led to a provisional agreement on the Wetʼsuwetʼen land rights in the area.

== Coastal GasLink pipeline project ==
The Coastal GasLink (CGL) pipeline is a 670-kilometre-long (420 mi) natural gas pipeline designed to carry natural gas from mines in north-eastern British Columbia to a liquefaction plant at the port of Kitimat. The project is intended to supply natural gas to several Asian energy companies, who are partners in the project. The pipeline's route passes through unceded lands of several First Nations peoples, including 190 kilometres (120 mi) of Wetʼsuwetʼen territory. Within the Wetʼsuwetʼen territory, the pipeline does not pass through reserves, only through traditional territory.

The consortium developed its plans for the pipeline route in the early 2010s, securing the approval of several First Nations councils along the route, but did not secure the approval of the Office of the Wetʼsuwetʼen, the hereditary government of the Wetʼsuwetʼen people, although most of the elected band councils of the Wetʼsuwetʼen First Nations did enter into a benefits agreement with TC Energy, the owner of the pipeline project.

In 2014, British Columbia authorities approved the environmental assessment of the project, then approved permits to construct the project in 2015 and 2016. TC Energy was given final approval by its partners to begin construction of the project in 2018, still without the consent of all of the Wetʼsuwetʼen hereditary chiefs. Only one of the nine sitting house chiefs, Samooh (Herb Naziel) supports the project.

=== Environmental infractions ===
CGL Pipeline has taken many actions that contradict their own company's environmental guidelines, as well as those of the Canadian government. Over the course of the project's existence, the BC Environmental Assessment Office (EAO) has found multiple violations of the company's environmental management plan. In December 2020, the provincial Environmental Assessment Office found that CGL had failed to properly comply with erosion and sediment control measures, a violation which posed a major risk to the health of the waterways the pipeline moves through. This environmental infringement also posed a high risk to fish habitats, according to reporting from CBC, with “sediment and turbid water from waterway construction [having] the potential to reduce the biological productivity of aquatic systems and suffocate fish eggs.”

Despite the fact that CGL has many different strategies to move the pipeline through waterways safely — ranging from man-made trenches to funnel the pipeline through the waterways to "trenchless" crossings where the pipeline tunnels beneath the waterway without touching the stream or river itself — the EAO has found that the uptake in turbid water and other insufficient sediment control persists. The violations cited by the EAO have affected numerous waterways during construction, including 68 wetlands, and even disrupting Fraser Lake with turbid water.

In addition to issues relating to the preservation of waterways, CGL has missed deadlines to protect plants and wildlife from construction, as well as leaving food in areas for natural predators to eat, creating further environmental risk for the Wetʼsuwetʼen and the stability of their land, as well as increased danger from predators in the area.

=== Threats from construction crews ===
The placement of CGL construction crews, including the existence of remote temporary lodgings for mostly male workers (known as man camps) also created more environmental issues, as well as safety issues for the Wetʼsuwetʼen. The danger of man camps in increasing the risk of abduction and murder of indigenous women was reported on in the final report of the National Inquiry into Missing and Murdered Indigenous Women, and the Office of the Wetʼsuwetʼen used this as evidence in their opposition to the extension of CGL's environmental certificate before the EAO in October 2020. The EAO stressed the importance of the issue but did not place it into evidence for the cancellation of the certificate.

CGL construction teams obstructed Wetʼsuwetʼen access to traplines – paths and walkways the nation uses to hunt and gather resources – creating strain on the Wetʼsuwetʼen way of life. In response to the infractions of crews blocking Wetʼsuwetʼen territory, CGL spokesperson Natasha Westover said, “CGL has an obligation to facilitate access for Indigenous peoples to their traditional territories; however, that access may be delayed where it is unsafe [to] provide access immediately.”

=== Threats to construction crews ===
In the early hours of February 17, 2022, twenty masked attackers, some carrying axes, forced nine people to flee from a work site near Houston, British Columbia. They attacked and injured RCMP officers attempting to respond. Ellis Ross said "There were workers inside a truck while attackers were trying to light it on fire." Damage is estimated to be "in the millions of dollars" according to Coastal GasLink.

== Wetʼsuwetʼen opposition ==
=== Background ===
The Wetʼsuwetʼen are an Indigenous nation made up of five clans including the: Gilseyhu (Big Frog), Laksilyu (Small Frog), Gitdumden (Wolf/Bear), Laksamshu (Fireweed) and the Tsayu (Beaver Clan). These five clans' territory lies in the central western portion of British Columbia. The language spoken by the Wetʼsuwetʼen people is Babine-Witsuwitʼen, one of the Athabaskan languages. Their traditional government, predating Confederation, is a system of chiefs representing each clan, called the hereditary chiefs. The chiefs have been represented by the non-profit Office of the Wetsuweten since 1994, before having a joint office with the Gitxsan. The elected band councils were created by order of the Government of Canada, under the Indian Act, to govern the reserves put in place, of which the Wetʼsuwetʼen have several.

According to hereditary chief Na’Moks (John Ridsdale), "it's the hereditary chiefs' duty to protect the territory". According to Na’Moks, the pipeline "is going along rivers, it will go over rivers and even in some instances, it will go under. One hundred and ninety kilometres of the proposed route will run through our territory. It threatens our water, our salmon, and our rights, our title, our jurisdiction". The pipeline would also go through areas of cultural significance to the Wetʼsuwetʼen.

In 1997, the Supreme Court of Canada issued the Delgamuukw-Gisdayʼwa decision, which ruled that aboriginal title exists as an exclusive territorial right for indigenous people. The ruling was made in an appeal of a Supreme Court of British Columbia decision, which had ruled against recognition of Wetʼsuwetʼen and Gitxsan land rights. The Supreme Court of Canada ruled that a new trial was warranted, but encouraged a negotiated settlement. The Wetʼsuwetʼen and Gitxsan then entered the treaty process with the BC government. However, the BC government's position that the Nations would only receive 4 to 6 per cent of their territory was unacceptable and the nations walked away from the process. Hence, the boundaries of the Wetʼsuwetʼen and Gitxsan nations' traditional territories are not yet recognized in Canadian law. In the absence of an agreement over aboriginal title and rights, the hereditary chiefs' position is that their full consent is required for any energy or resource projects within their territory, and the CGL does not have their consent. The rights and title issue has also been the basis for several solidarity protests, which have also objected to the actions and presence of the RCMP within the Wetʼsuwetʼen traditional territory (known in Babine-Witsuwitʼen as yintah).

=== Blockades, injunctions and RCMP interventions ===
==== 2010 ====
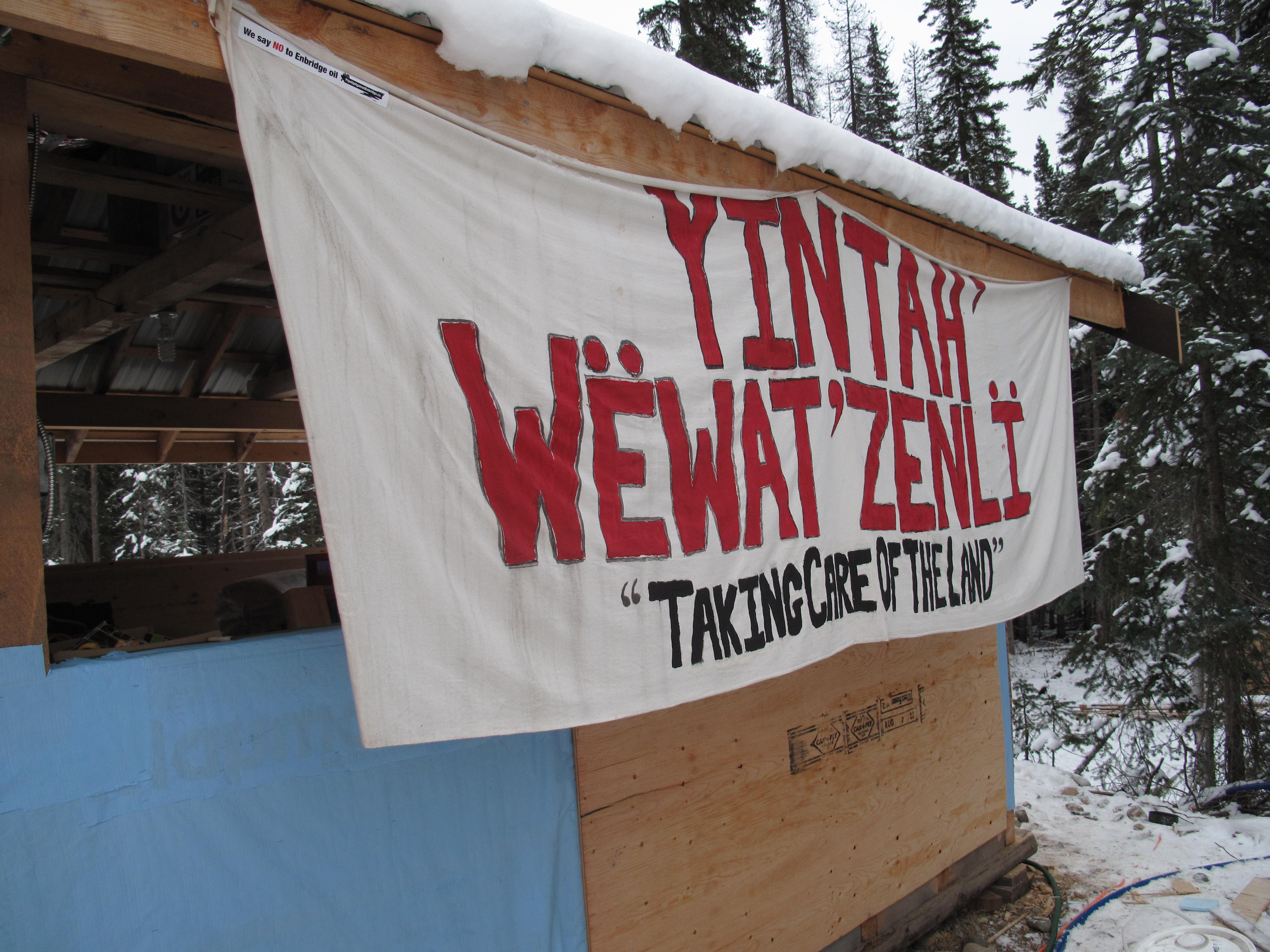
A banner at Unistʼotʼen camp in 2012

Beginning in 2010, the Wetʼsuwetʼen hereditary chiefs and their supporters set up barricades and checkpoints along the Morice West Forest Service Road that provides access to the construction of pipeline projects that threatened their territory, originally the Enbridge Northern Gateway Pipelines, and later also Coastal GasLink (planning for which began in 2012). The largest of those camps is Unistʼotʼen Camp, directly in the path of the pipeline, established in 2010 as a checkpoint, and has since added a healing centre.

==== 2018 ====
After TC Energy received its partners' go-ahead in November, it appealed to the Supreme Court of British Columbia to grant an injunction to stop the blockade of its intended route through the Wetʼsuwetʼen territory. A temporary injunction was issued in December by BC Supreme Court Judge Marguerite Church to allow CGL pre-construction work.

==== 2019 ====
On January 7, the RCMP conducted a raid to enforce TC Energy's injunction, removing the barricades on the Morice Forest Service Road and arresting 14 of the Wetʼsuwetʼen land defenders. The RCMP faced criticism from protesters for the amount of force used in the raid, including police snipers, helicopters, and over a dozen police vehicles. The RCMP set up a continuous presence along the road, setting up a local detachment called the Community Industry Safety Office. RCMP at this injunction have faced any protesters attempting to enter with arrest, causing the Wetʼsuwetʼen to remain in place along the road

In December, TC Energy prepared to start construction in the Wetʼsuwetʼen territory. It applied for an extension of the injunction order as the land defenders had resumed blockading access after the pre-construction work was done. This injunction was extended by Judge Church of the BC Supreme Court on December 31. The extension included an order authorizing the RCMP to enforce the injunction. In her decision, Church stated: "There is a public interest in upholding the rule of law and restraining illegal behaviour and protecting of the right of the public, including the plaintiff, to access on Crown roads," and "the defendants may genuinely believe in their rights under indigenous law to prevent the plaintiff from entering Dark House territory, but the law does not recognize any right to blockade and obstruct the plaintiff from pursuing lawfully authorized activities." In a public statement, the Wetʼsuwetʼen chief rejected the decision.

==== 2020 ====
On January 1, after rejecting the injunction, the hereditary chiefs ordered the eviction of the RCMP and Coastal GasLink personnel from the Wetʼsuwetʼen territory.

On January 30, the RCMP announced that they would stand down while the hereditary chiefs and the province met to discuss and try to come to an agreement. On February 3, the Office of the Wetʼsuwetʼen asked for a judicial review of the environmental approval for the pipeline. All parties issued statements on February 4 that the talks had broken down.

On February 6, the RCMP began removing the blockades on Wetʼsuwetʼen territory, arresting 28 land defenders at camps along the route between February 6 and 9. All were released within two days. The RCMP also detained several reporters and were accused of interfering with the freedom of the press. Union of British Columbia Indian Chiefs Grand Chief Stewart Phillip stated that "we are in absolute outrage and a state of painful anguish as we witness the Wetʼsuwetʼen people having their title and rights brutally trampled on and their right to self-determination denied." During the enforcement action by the RCMP, a large amount of advanced equipment was used, including heavily armed tactical teams, division liaison personnel, regular uniformed officers, canine units, helicopters, drones and snowmobiles, according to CBC News.

On February 11, the RCMP announced that the road to the construction site was cleared and TC Energy announced that work would resume the following Monday. After the hereditary chiefs made it a condition for talks with government, the RCMP closed their local office and moved to their detachment in Houston on February 22.

Throughout February and March, solidarity protests and blockades were held across the world. Most in-person actions were halted in mid-March due to the COVID-19 pandemic, but online solidarity rallies continued.

On June 5, the BC Prosecution Service issued a statement saying that criminal contempt charges for 22 members of the Wetʼsuwetʼen Nation and their supporters would not be pursued. Additionally, Coastal GasLink issued a statement that they would not pursue civil contempt charges against the protesters.

=== Meetings and memorandum of understanding ===
Three days of meetings between the hereditary chiefs, Crown-Indigenous Relations Minister Carolyn Bennett and BC Indigenous Relations Minister Scott Fraser began on February 27 in Smithers, British Columbia. The RCMP agreed to stop all patrols on the Morice West Forest Service Road and to shut down their mobile detachment (CISO) during the meetings. In addition, Coastal GasLink agreed to suspend operations in the territory during the talks. RCMP and CGL work resumed on the territory once the meetings were complete.

On March 1, Bennett, Fraser, and representatives of the Wetʼsuwetʼen, including hereditary chiefs and matriarchs announced a proposed memorandum of understanding (MOU) to address the Wetʼsuwetʼen land rights, title and a protocol for addressing any future projects impacting their territory. Specific details of the agreement were not immediately released, because the MOU had to first be seen and ratified by the broader Wetʼsuwetʼen nation. However, all parties to the discussions made it clear that the agreement did not address the CGL Pipeline project.

On March 10, Theresa Tait-Day, president of the Wetʼsuwetʼen Matrilineal Coalition (WMC), (who was stripped of the subchief name Wiʼhaliʼyte in the mid-2010s over her support of the pipeline and alleged conflict of interest) released a statement that the proposed MOU was not inclusive of the entire community, saying "the government has legitimized the meeting with the five [sic] hereditary chiefs and left out their entire community. We can not be dictated to by a group of five guys [sic]." According to Tait-Day, "over 80 per cent of the people in our community said they wanted LNG [First Nations LNG Alliance] to proceed." In a op-ed in the National Post, members of the Gidimt’en Clan publicly supported the pipeline's construction, expressing frustration that the protesters and activists did not represent the views of the entire Wetʼsuwetʼen Nation.

Individual Wetʼsuwetʼen clans held meetings to review the MOU throughout March. The MOU was ratified by the attendees of one meeting of the Laksilyu (Small Frog Clan). According to the hereditary chiefs, the Gilseyhu (Big Frog Clan) met once and endorsed the MOU, as did the Laksamshu (Fireweed and Owl Clan) and the Tsayu (Beaver Clan). The Gitdumden (Wolf and Bear Clan) met twice, but their third meeting was cancelled due to a death in the community. A planned all-clans meeting on March 19 was cancelled, for a variety of factors including concerns over the spread of COVID-19.

On April 30, the hereditary chiefs made a joint statement with the provincial and federal governments that all five clans had agreed to ratify the MOU. However, the elected chiefs of five Wetʼsuwetʼen band governments (Nee Tahi Buhn Indian Band, Skin Tyee Nation, Tsʼil Kaz Koh First Nation, Wetʼsuwetʼen First Nation, and Witset First Nation) released their own joint statement in response the following day, calling on the agreement to be withdrawn, saying they weren't consulted properly. A further statement released on May 11 called once again for the agreement to be withdrawn so the elected governments could be consulted properly, and further calling for Minister Bennett to resign. The May 11 statement was not signed by Chief Sandra George of Witset or Chief Cynthia Joseph of Hagwilget.

The draft agreement was finally distributed to the elected band councils on May 7, to all other Wetʼsuwetʼen the following day, and finally it was published on the Office of the Wetʼsuwetʼen website on May 12.

The MOU was signed by hereditary chiefs, Minister Bennett, and Minister Fraser on May 14 in a virtual ceremony via Zoom. The memorandum does not address the CGL Pipeline project, nor does it alter Wetʼsuwetʼen rights and title. The MOU states that the Canadian and British Columbian governments recognize that those rights and title are held under the Wetʼsuwetʼen's own system of governance, and commits Canada and BC to a three-month process to craft a formal Affirmation Agreement that confirm aboriginal title as a legal right. It also establishes a twelve-month timeline for negotiation on jurisdiction including over land-use planning, resources, water, wildlife, fish, and child and family wellness. Further, it acknowledges that reunification of the rift between the hereditary leadership and the elected band councils is an essential part of the implementation of the MOU.

=== Further developments ===
==== BC Supreme Court hearing October 2020 ====
On October 1, the Office of the Wet’suwet’en began a hearing in the BC Supreme Court. The Office of the Wet’suwet’en requested that the Court reject the province's decision to extend CGL's environmental certificate for five years. Lawyers for the Office of the Wet’suwet’en claimed the Environmental Assessment Office (EAO) did not meaningfully account for the final report on Missing and murdered Indigenous women and girls (MMIWG), published in June 2019, as well as the pipeline company's long history of non-compliance with the EAO's own conditions and standards. The EAO's position was that there was no basis for judiciary review of their decision.

In a decision published on May 20, 2021, Justice Norell found that the assessment office had asked CGL to consider how indigenous nations would be involved in identifying and monitoring social impacts of the project, and deemed those comments to "not indicate a failure or refusal of the [assessment office] to consider the [MMIWG] inquiry report, but the opposite." As for the company's history of non-compliance, Justice Norell also disagreed that the EAO had not accounted for that, stating that "Both the frequency and nature of the non-compliances are addressed [in the statement of the environmental assessment certificate]" and further, that "the Evaluation Report concludes that: the non-compliance which had occurred had been addressed by the enforcement process; and CGL was committed to compliance, and had either rectified or was in the process of rectifying any non-compliance."

==== 2021–2022 Morice River conflict ====
The 2020 memorandum of understanding did not address the CGL pipeline, and construction met with continued opposition from the Gidimtʼen Access Point and Unistʼotʼen groups during 2021. On September 25, 2021, Cas Yikh house and Gidimtʼen clan members erected new blockades on the Morice West Forest Service Road to block CGL's attempts to drill under the Morice River. These blockades included many solar-panelled tiny home structures, some of which were furnished and stocked with kitchens. Sleydoʼ (Molly Wickham), one of the leaders of Gidimtʼen Access Point, claimed that the work near the river would disrupt her people's livelihoods as well as the salmon population. She called on supporters to join the new blockades. A Gidimtʼen Access Point press release called the Morice River "sacred headwaters that nourish the Wetʼsuwetʼen Yintah [territory] and all those within its catchment area". Coastal GasLink president Tracy Robinson issued a statement about the drilling, saying "our crews will utilize a micro-tunnel method which is a type of trenchless crossing that is constructed well below the riverbed and does not disturb the stream or the bed and banks of the river". Robinson said that experts deemed micro-tunnelling to be the safest and most environmentally-responsible method. She also said that there was still an enforceable injunction against any opposition to CGL construction. In the days after the new blockades went up, the RCMP removed two of them, arresting at least one person.

In a November 2021 interview, Sleydoʼ said that RCMP had used abusive force to remove a Wetʼsuwetʼen protester who locked himself underneath a bus being used as a blockade. She said the man was "receiving ongoing medical care and has [nerve damage] in his hands" after being lifted by the legs and repeatedly slammed against the ground while his hands were clipped under the vehicle. Wetʼsuwetʼen Chief Dstaʼhyl confronted construction crews in October, disabling one of their excavators following numerous warnings. The excavator was recovered by CGL that afternoon.

On November 18 and 19, RCMP dismantled the blockades and arrested 29 people including Sleydoʼ and two journalists.

In February 2022, masked assailants threatened CGL workers and destroyed millions of dollars' worth of equipment. No arrests were made.

In September 2022, drilling equipment was in place, and CGL was preparing to drill under the river. Members of the Gidimtʼen Clan and residents of Unistʼotʼen Camp said that they were under constant surveillance.

==== 2026 ====
In a case stemming from protests against the Coastal GasLink pipeline, Wetʼsuwetʼen hereditary Chief Dstaʼhyl (Adam Bernard Gagnon) appealed a criminal contempt conviction, arguing his violation of an injunction was compelled by Wetʼsuwetʼen trespass law. The British Columbia Court of Appeal dismissed the appeal, characterizing his defense as a novel claim and ruling that the recognition of Indigenous legal orders does not excuse individuals from breaching Canadian court orders.

== Solidarity protests ==
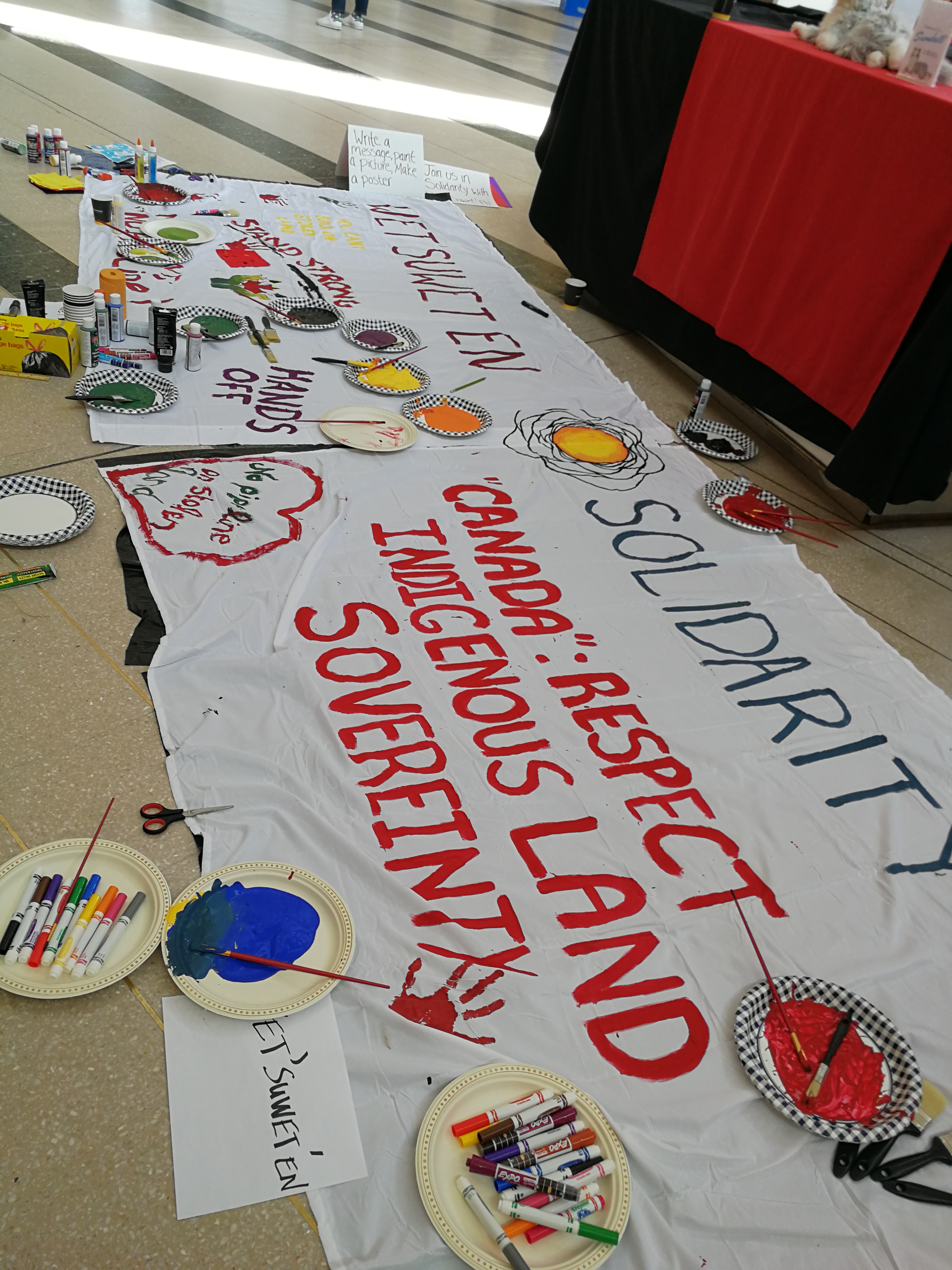
Banner for an event in solidarity with the Wetʼsuwetʼen hereditary chiefs at York University on March 11

Protests on January 20 disrupted BC ferry service leaving from Swartz Bay, which is Victoria's main ferry link to the BC mainland. BC ferries later obtained a preemptive injunction to prevent anticipated future demonstrations from blocking Vancouver–Victoria ferry service.

Once the RCMP began to take down the Wetʼsuwetʼen blockades, protests sprang up across Canada in solidarity with the hereditary chiefs and the land defenders. On February 11, protesters surrounded the BC Legislature in Victoria, preventing the traditional ceremonies around the reading of the Throne Speech by the Lieutenant Governor. Members of the legislature had to have police assistance to enter or used alternate entrances. Other protests took place in Hamilton, Nelson, Calgary, Regina, Winnipeg, Toronto, Ottawa, Sherbrooke, and Halifax.

Several major protests blocked access to the Port of Vancouver, Deltaport, and two other ports in Metro Vancouver for a number of days before the Metro Vancouver police began enforcing an injunction on the morning of February 10, arresting 47 protesters who refused to cease obstructing the port.

Protests on February 15 over 200 people in Toronto blocked Macmillan Yard, the second largest rail classification yard in Canada. On February 16 and 17 temporarily blocked the Rainbow Bridge in Niagara Falls, Ontario and Thousand Islands Bridge in Ivy Lea, Ontario, two major border crossings between the United States and Canada. At the same time, Miꞌkmaq demonstrators partially blocked access to the Confederation Bridge, the sole road link to Prince Edward Island. On February 18, several activists were arrested for trespassing at BC Premier Horgan's residence. On February 24, demonstrators shut down a major junction in Hamilton, Ontario.

A nation-wide student walkout occurred March 4, with university students across the country showing their support for the Wetʼsuwetʼen protesters.

The protests led to the creation of several hashtags, used widely on social media in relation to coverage of the protests. These include #ShutDownCanada, #WetsuwetenStrong, #LandBack, and #AllEyesOnWetsuweten.

By September 21, over 200 Facebook users had been blocked from posting or sending messages on the site. All the blocked accounts had shared information about an online rally held on May 7 in support of the ongoing struggle against the construction of the CGL pipeline. When asked by organizers why the accounts had been suspended, a spokesperson from Facebook said, "our systems mistakenly removed these accounts and content. They have since been restored and we’ve lifted any limits imposed on identified profiles."

=== Rail disruptions ===
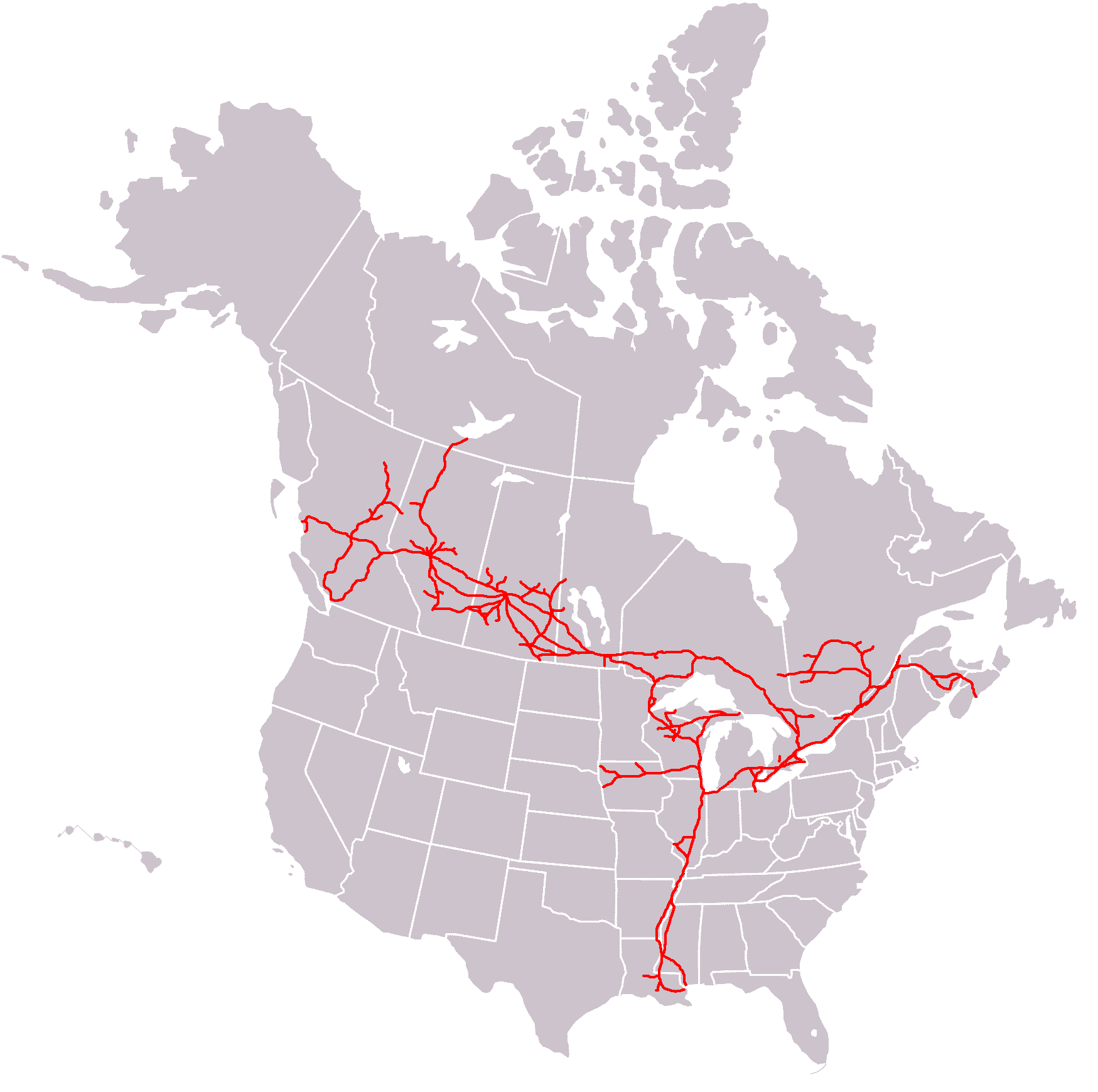
Map of the Canadian National Railway system. Much of the network east of Toronto was temporarily shut down on February 13 due to protests and blockades in eastern Canada.

Other First Nations, activists and other supporters of the Wetʼsuwetʼen hereditary chiefs targeted railway lines for their demonstrations of solidarity. Near Belleville, Ontario, members of the Mohawks of the Bay of Quinte First Nation began a blockade of the Canadian National Railway rail line just north of Tyendinaga Mohawk Territory on February 6, causing Via Rail to cancel trains on their Toronto–Montreal and Toronto-Ottawa routes. The line is critical to the CNR network in Eastern Canada as CNR has no other east–west rail lines through Eastern Ontario. However, in order to mitigate major economic disruption, CNR brokered a "workaround" agreement with Canadian Pacific Railway (CPR) to share tracks in order to avoid the Mohawk protesters.

Other protests blocking rail lines halted service on Via Rail's Prince Rupert and Prince George lines, running on CNR tracks. Protests on the CNR line west of Winnipeg additionally blocked the Canadian, the passenger rail route operated by Via Rail from Vancouver to Toronto. Protests disrupted multiple GO Transit rail services in Toronto, Hamilton and Exo's Candiac line in Montreal. CPR rail lines were also disrupted in downtown Toronto and south of Montreal. The Société du Chemin de fer de la Gaspésie (SCFG) freight railway between Gaspé and Matapedia was blockaded on February 10 by members of the Listuguj Miꞌgmaq First Nation.

Starting on February 6, Via Rail announced passenger train cancellations on a day-to-day basis. Trains on the Toronto-Ottawa and Toronto-Montreal routes were cancelled first. Prince George-Prince Rupert service was suspended on February 11. Canadian National Railway (CNR) rail freight traffic was also halted along these lines. Other Canadian routes were intermittently disrupted as well.

On February 13, CNR shut down its rail lines east of Toronto. On the same day Via Rail, which rents these lines for its passenger service, announced it would be shutting down its entire network, with the exception of the Sudbury–White River train line and the Winnipeg–Churchill train between Churchill and The Pas, until further notice.

Amtrak international service from New York City to Toronto and Montreal was not affected. Amtrak rail service between Seattle and Vancouver on BNSF Railway Company lines was intermittently blocked; Amtrak's bus operation over the same route was not affected.

CNR issued multiple injunctions against the protesters, including several separate injunctions against the Mohawk protesters near Belleville. The Ontario Provincial Police decided not to act immediately on the injunctions.

The rail blockade of Prince Rupert was lifted on February 14. On February 18, Via announced partial restoration of passenger service starting February 20, between Ottawa and Quebec City. Via later announced it would resume some south-western Ontario routes. Trans-Canada passenger service was not restored.

On February 19, a group of about 20 protesters from a group called "Cuzzins for Wetʼsuwetʼen" erected a blockade on a CN rail line in west Edmonton, Alberta. CN obtained a court injunction, and less than twelve hours after the blockade began, it was dismantled by counter-protesters after a CN legal representative arrived to serve the injunction.

On February 19, activists set up a blockade on the Mont-Saint-Hilaire rail line in Saint-Lambert, Quebec, promising to stay until the RCMP leaves the disputed zone in Wetʼsuwetʼen territory. The blockade caused Via Rail to postpone resuming service between Montreal and Quebec City. The Mont-Saint-Hilaire rail line was cleared on February 21, 2019 after Quebec Police arrived to enforce a CNR injunction.

On February 20, another blockade of CPR tracks sprang up between Kamloops and Chase in British Columbia. The protesters left voluntarily on February 21, after the RCMP offered to leave the Wetʼsuwetʼen land. The group vowed to return in four days if a dialogue was not started between the prime minister and the hereditary chiefs. This was followed by CPR writing an open letter to Prime Minister Trudeau, asking him to speak directly with the hereditary chiefs. The Mont-Saint-Hilaire rail line was cleared on February 21, after Quebec Police arrived to enforce a CNR injunction.

On March 5, the rail blockades in Kahnawake and the Gaspé Peninsula were removed peacefully by the First Nations involved.

In early March, Canada's medical officer had advised against gatherings, as part of the country's response to the COVID-19 pandemic, and by the second week of March, most blockades had come down. Despite the widespread closures in response to the pandemic, CGL is continuing construction in the disputed territory. Pipeline opponents launched a letter-writing campaign urging the company to stop on March 21.

Businesses attacked by protesters, such as CN Rail, have filed lawsuits against protesters to recover damages.

=== Economic impact ===
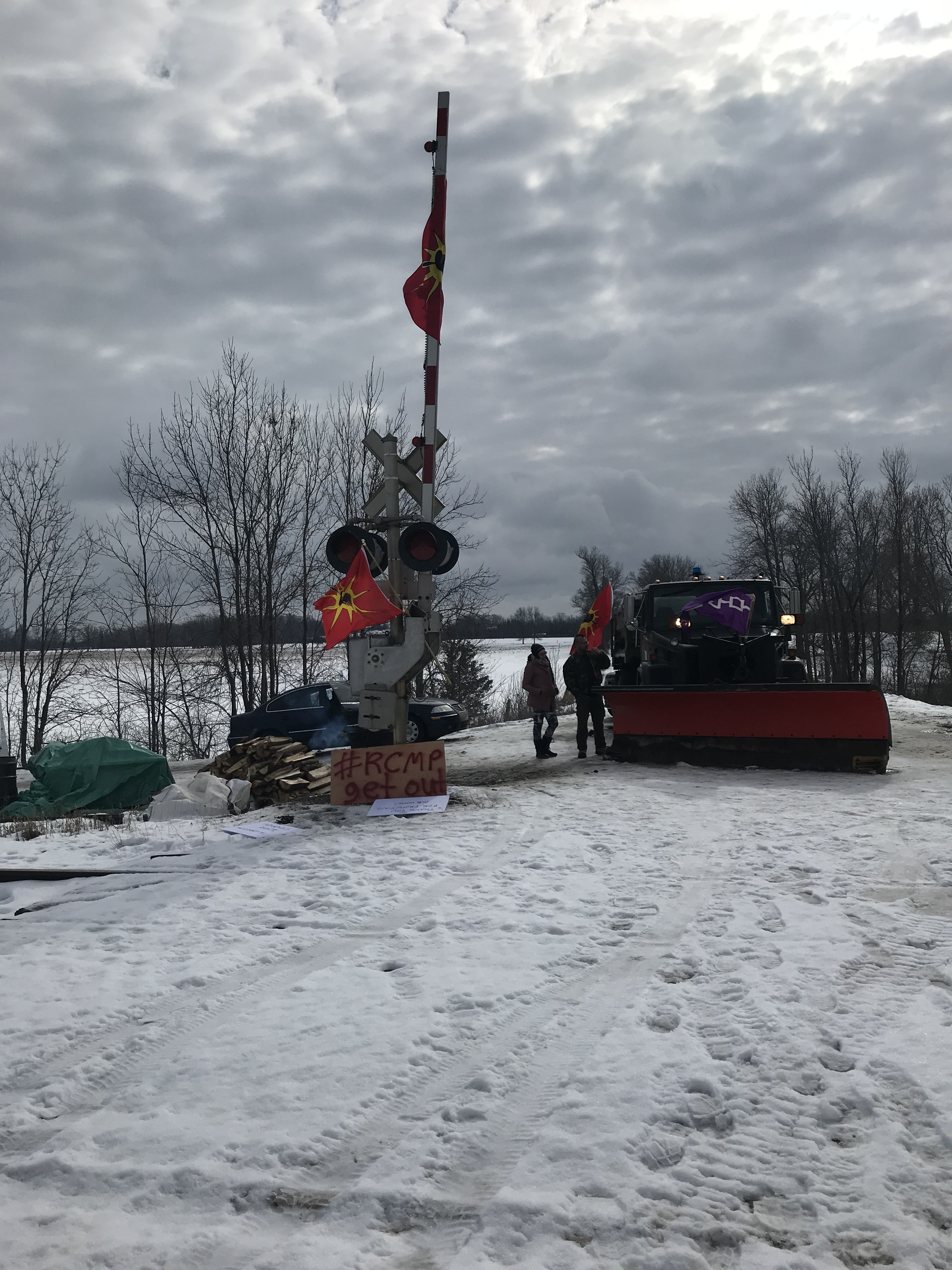
Mohawk protesters by the level crossing at Wyman Road in Tyendinaga. This blockade along a critical rail line led to CNR shutting down its network in eastern Canada.

The blockades led to the shutdown of CNR's Eastern Canadian network, causing a complete halt of freight traffic from Halifax west to Toronto. On February 19, Canadian Manufacturers and Exporters estimated that CA$425 million in goods were being stranded each day of the shutdown. An executive of the Business Council of Canada called the shutdown "potentially a catastrophe for the economy" and said that rail "is the backbone of infrastructure in this country".

Due to a poor growing season which resulted in an unusually late harvest just before Christmas, Canadian wheat and barley shipments were already in a backlog and were further impacted by the rail blockades. Spring farm supplies such as fertilizer were also delayed by the rail shutdown. Canadian grain farmers have previously advocated to have rail transport declared an essential service. Canadian Federation of Agriculture president Mary Robinson warned of "huge financial consequences" as farmers do not get paid until products are delivered to the market.

Dennis Darby, president and CEO of the Canadian Manufacturers and Exporters Association, states that Canadian manufacturers rely on 4,500 rail cars per day, which represent both supply chain and delivery of finished products. Many of these products are too large or bulky to be shipped by other means. The total value of these deliveries amounts to CA$200 billion annually. Chemicals trade group Responsible Distribution Canada warned of shortages of chlorine to purify drinking water. Supply chains for chlorine, jet fuel and de-icing fluid all rely on rail transport: "You can't put it in a truck and send it down the 401" said an executive of the Chemistry Industry Association of Canada. Mining, which accounted for 20% of Canada's 2018 exports, also moves "most" of its output by rail. By February 21, four thousand containers reportedly sat on the docks of Montreal waiting for transport and no grain had arrived for shipment at the port. In Halifax, the Atlantic Container Line has diverted to New York and Baltimore. In Vancouver, goods waiting to be shipped east led to a backlog of 50 ships waiting to be unloaded.

The disruption of propane rail shipments was expected to lead to shortages and rationing, during a time when many communities were experiencing extremely cold weather. In Atlantic Canada, at the end of the propane supply line, reserves fell to a five-day supply by February 14. Superior Propane, Canada's largest supplier, rationed distribution in Atlantic Canada.

SCFG laid off five of its 30 employees on February 14. On February 18, CNR laid off 450 employees for reasons related to the pipeline disruptions; the company has stated that as many as 6,000 of its 24,000 employees could be laid off. On February 19, Via Rail announced temporary layoffs of up to 1,000 people due to the blockades. By the first week of March, the majority of the laid-off Via Rail employees and all of the affected CNR employees were recalled.

Scrapped rail passenger services in the Montreal-Toronto-Ottawa triangle, caused more than 42,000 Via Rail passengers and more Trans-Canada passengers to seek alternatives.

On March 13, Parliamentary Budget Officer Yves Giroux released a report that the protests would leave "a minimal dent in the pace of economic growth", estimating that the blockades would reduce Canadian economic growth by 0.2% for the first quarter of 2020. For the whole year, the expectation was for the GDP to fall by CA$275 million, about 0.01% of the total GDP, which Giroux referred to as "a blip", despite the warnings by businesses of shortages, referred to by the PBO as "overblown". The PBO said that the COVID-19 pandemic would likely have a greater impact on the economy.

== Federal government response and reaction ==
Prime Minister Justin Trudeau said politicians should not be telling the police how to deal with protesters and that resolution should come through dialogue. The Canadian government does not tell the police what to do operationally. In any case, the police services are under provincial or municipal control.

On February 12, Canada's Indigenous Services Minister Marc Miller began a dialogue with several indigenous leaders from different parts of Canada. On February 15, Miller met the Mohawks in a ceremonial encounter on the CNR train tracks to renew a 17th-century treaty between the Iroquois and the British Crown known as the Silver Covenant Chain. Miller then discussed the blockade with the leaders of Mohawks of the Bay of Quinte First Nation, along with Kanenhariyo, one of the primary organizers of the protest near Tyendinaga. Miller asked for a temporary drawback of the protest but his request was refused after Wetʼsuwetʼen hereditary Chief Woos, who was on the phone, stated that the RCMP was still on his territory and "they are out there with guns, threatening us". Leaked audio of the meetings included a Mohawk resident in the meeting telling the minister to "Get the red coats out first, get the blue coats out ... then we can maybe have some common discussions". Miller returned to Ottawa and met with Prime Minister Trudeau and other members of the Cabinet called the "Incident Response Group". Trudeau had returned from a foreign relations trip to deal with the issue.

On February 18, the House of Commons of Canada resumed after the winter break. Trudeau addressed the Commons asking Canadians for patience as the government sought a negotiated end. "On all sides, people are upset and frustrated. I get it. It's understandable because this is about things that matter—rights and livelihoods, the rule of law and our democracy." Opposition leader Andrew Scheer condemned the government's refusal to use the police to stop the illegal blockades, calling it "the weakest response to a national crisis in Canadian history. Will our country be one of the rule of the law, or will our country be one of the rule of the mob?" Trudeau held a private meeting with the other opposition parties' leaders, barring Scheer after his comments.

On February 18, the Assembly of First Nations (AFN) held a press conference in Ottawa. AFN National Chief Perry Bellegarde called for all parties to engage in dialogue. "It's on everybody. It's not on any one individual. I'm just calling on all the parties to come together, get this dialogue started in a constructive way."

On February 20, according to a statement from Canadian Public Safety Minister Bill Blair, the RCMP agreed to move its personnel from Wetʼsuwetʼen territory to nearby Houston. The next day, Prime Minister Trudeau held a press conference to state "Canadians have been patient. Our government has been patient, but it has been two weeks and the barricades need to come down now. The government had made repeated overtures to the hereditary chiefs to hold meetings but had been ignored. You can't have dialogue when only one party is coming to the table. Our hand remains extended should someone want to reach for it. We have come to a moment where the onus is now on Indigenous leadership."

Shortly after Trudeau's statement on February 21, the Wetʼsuwetʼen hereditary chiefs released a statement reaffirming that discussions would continue once all RCMP and CGL personnel vacate the Wetʼsuwetʼen territory. At the same time, the Mohawk of Tyendinaga asserted that their rail blockade would be removed as soon as Wetʼsuwetʼen legal observers confirm that the RCMP is off their land. On February 24, the day of the Mohawk blockade removal by the OPP, Indigenous Services Minister Miller repeated that the Liberal government was "still open for dialogue" and willing to negotiate.

On February 24, in a statement signed and supported by over 200 Canadian lawyers and legal scholars, Beverly Jacobs and Sylvia McAdam of the University of Windsor, Alex Neve of Amnesty International, and Harsha Walia of the BC Civil Liberties Association responded to the calls for the "rule of law". In their opinion, it is the Canadian federal and provincial governments that are breaking international law, not the Wetʼsuwetʼen hereditary chiefs. They also pointed out that the requirements laid out in the UN Declaration on the Rights of Indigenous Peoples have continued to be ignored by Canadian courts, although Canadian governments have expressed a willingness to follow the UN resolution. They called for an end to the violation of indigenous persons' right to free, prior and informed consent.

In early May, the elected chiefs of several Wetʼsuwetʼen band councils (primarily Nee-Tahi-Buhn, Skin Tyee, Tsʼil Kaz Koh, and Wetʼsuwetʼen First Nations) called on Minister Bennett to resign, as the Canadian and BC governments, along with the hereditary chiefs, pressed forward with the memorandum of understanding. In a statement on May 11, before the signing of the memorandum, the elected chiefs called on Minister Bennett to resign due to her "disregard for [their] special relationship". They repeated this demand in a statement on May 14, after the signing of the MOU, and added a call for Minister Marc Miller to speak up about his "intention to protect the programs and services the Wetʼsuwetʼen people depend on".

On October 2, CBC News reported that information related to protests in February that they had requested from the Canadian Security Intelligence Service (CSIS) under the Access to Information Act had been withheld. CSIS cited section 15 of the act in withholding the information, which defines "subversive or hostile activities" as including sabotage, terrorism, actions directed at a "government change", activities that "threaten" Canadians or federal employees, and espionage.

Documents obtained by CBC News in 2019 found that in the two years of their near constant presence on the Morice Forest Service Road, the RCMP had spent over $13 million on policing. Chief Naʼmoks compared that very high level of spending with the perceived inaction by the RCMP over violent attacks and harassment of Mi'kmaw fishers in Nova Scotia.

== See also ==
- Timeline of the 2020 Canadian pipeline and railway protests – Widespread protests in Canada in 2020
- Trans Mountain pipeline – Oil pipeline in southwestern Canada
- Treaty rights – Indigenous rights stipulated in treaties with settler societies
- Oka Crisis – 1990 land dispute between a group of Mohawk people and the town of Oka, Quebec, Canada
- Grand River land dispute – Dispute over Indigenous land rights in Canada
- Fairy Creek old-growth logging protests – Ongoing environmentalist and indigenous rights protests
- Delgamuukw v British Columbia – 1997 Supreme Court of Canada case
- Critical Infrastructure Defence Act
- Yintah – 2024 Canadian documentary film
