= Wetʼsuwetʼen First Nation =

First Nations band in British Columbia, Canada

- Band No. 725
- Wetʼsuwetʼen First Nation location in traditional Wetʼsuwetʼen territory within British Columbia, Canada
- People: Wetʼsuwetʼen
- Province: British Columbia

Land
- Main reserve: Palling 1
- Reserves: List: Duncan Lake 2; Felix George 7; Foxy Creek 6; Gaichbin 6; Klagookchew 9; Maxan Creek 5; Maxan Lake 3; Maxan Lake 4; Tatla West 11; Tsichgass 10
- Land area: 7.008 km^{2} (2.706 sq mi)

Population (2025)
- On reserve: 81
- On other land: 12
- Off reserve: 159
- Total population: 252

Government
- Chief: Maureen Luggi
- Council: Heather Nooski; Karen Ogen-Toews

Tribal Council
- Carrier Sekani Tribal Council

Website
- wetsuweten.net

The Wetʼsuwetʼen First Nation is a Wetʼsuwetʼen First Nations band located outside of the village of Burns Lake, British Columbia, Canada. It was formerly known as the Broman Lake Indian Band and is still usually referred to as Broman Lake although this is no longer its official name. Its members speak the Wetʼsuwetʼen dialect of Babine-Witsuwitʼen, a Northern Athabaskan language. The main community is on Palling Indian Reserve No. 1.

As of March 2017, the Nation had 257 registered members, with 85 members living on the First Nation's own reserve.

The Nation is a member of the Carrier Sekani Tribal Council and of the Broman Lake Development Corporation.

The Wetʼsuwetʼen First Nation was formerly part of the Omineca Band. In 1984, the Omineca Band split into the Broman Lake and Nee-Tahi-Buhn Band. The Skin Tyee band later split off from Nee-Tahi-Buhn.

On March 18, 2021, a long-term drinking water advisory was finally lifted, after having been in place since March 13, 2013 after arsenic was found in the Nation's water. The advisory was lifted with the installation of a temporary water treatment plant and discussion of plans for a more permanent structure. The advisory had affected 24 homes and four commercial buildings.

Other Wetʼsuwetʼen First Nations bands include the Burns Lake Indian Band, Hagwilget Village First Nation, Skin Tyee First Nation, Nee-Tahi-Buhn Band and Witset.

== See also ==
- Coastal GasLink Pipeline
- 2020 Canadian pipeline and railway protests
