= Bulkley Valley =

Valley in British Columbia, Canada

Coordinates: 54°46′55″N 127°10′05″W

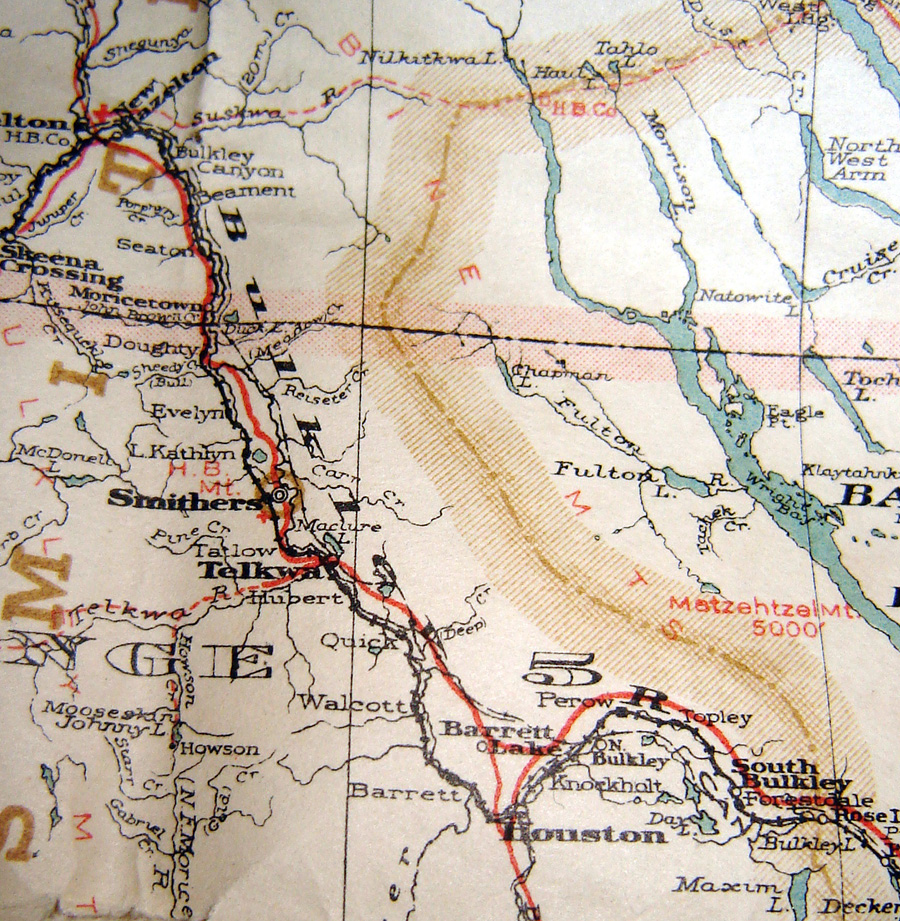
Provincial Government Map, 1923. Cropped to show Bulkley Valley.

The Bulkley Valley is in the northwest Central Interior of British Columbia, Canada.

== Geography ==
The Bulkley, a stream running through Houston, British Columbia, joins the larger Morice River about 6 kilometres (3.7 mi) to the west. At the confluence, they become not the Morice, but unusually, take the name of the smaller Bulkley. The 257-kilometre (160 mi) Bulkley River flows northwestward through the valley that is bounded on the west by the Hudson Bay Mountain range and on the east by the Babine Mountains. The northern boundary of the valley is usually considered the Bulkey's confluence with the Skeena River at Hazelton, although it is sometimes placed further south near Witset. The valley's southern edge is at Bulkley Lake, part way between Houston and Burns Lake.

== History ==
=== First Nations ===
Wet'suwet'en people have called the valley home for thousands of years. In the Delgamuukw decision of 1997, the Supreme Court of Canada affirmed the Wet'suwet'en and neighbouring Gitxsan have Aboriginal title in the area.

=== Surveys and telegraph trail ===
Simon McGillivray of the Hudson's Bay Company (HBC), who ventured into the northern part of the valley in 1833, is recorded as the first European visitor. William Downie followed in 1859 while apparently surveying a possible transcontinental railway route. Michael Byrnes (after whom Burns Lake is named) and Henry McNeill, Collins Overland Telegraph surveyors, were the first to travel the entire length of the valley. Charles S. Bulkley (after whom the river and valley are named) was the company chief engineer for construction, but not a site employee. By September 1866, the line had crossed the valley following the Bulkley to its junction with the Skeena River. Following the successful completion of the transatlantic telegraph cable, work halted on the Collins telegraph in March 1867, and prompted its 1869 closure north of Quesnel.

N. B. Gauvreau in 1890–1891 and A. L. Poudrier in 1892 conducted government surveys of the valley. The Poudrier party improved the former telegraph trail to a wagon road standard south to Moricetown, and made other sections suitable for packhorses. During 1897–1901, the prospectors who followed the trail on their way to the Klondike Gold Rush observed the valley's agriculture and mining potential. In 1898, the Dominion government established a ranch at Pleasant Valley (Houston area), and the HBC in the Driftwood area.

=== Yukon telegraph & pioneer settlers ===
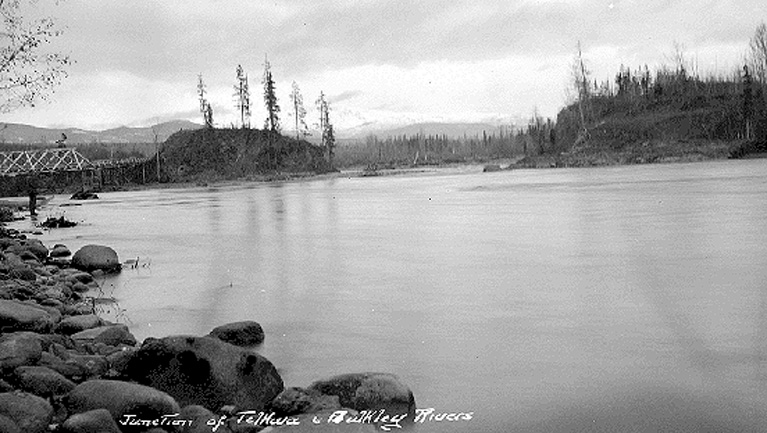
Bulkley Valley. Confluence of the Telkwa and Bulkley Rivers, 1909

The first phase of the Yukon telegraph, with a branch to Atlin, was constructed in 1899. The 900-mile (1,400 km) second phase, connecting Atlin and Quesnel along the abandoned Collins telegraph route, was completed in 1901. The 20-foot right-of-way improved access to the Bulkley Valley from both eastward points and the sternwheeler terminal at Hazelton to the west. Charles Barrett (1866–1946), and Edward Charleson, who worked on the telegraph construction, settled six miles (9.7 km) west of Houston at what became Barrett. Barret later bought out Charleson and acquired the government ranch, naming the expanded property the "Diamond D". Prospectors and a small number of settlers lived elsewhere in the valley.

In 1902, a delegation urged the BC government to initiate preemptions in the valley. Although the government approved a scheme for 100 families to each receive 100 acres of free land for every 320 acres preempted, prohibitive freight costs limited new settlers to a trickle. The government offered veterans from the Boer War 160-acre land grants, and the valley became a popular choice. Unfortunately, most veterans on sold to speculators, soon creating vast parcels of undeveloped fertile land. For example, Francis Rattenbury acquired about 50,000 acres in the valley. Settlement proceeded slowly. In 1904, developers staked out the community of Aldermere on the hill above Telkwa. By 1906, the valley contained 74 non-native permanent residents. Telkwa was surveyed the following year. By 1910, upgrades to the wagon road stretched 30 miles (48 km) south of this point. By 1911, a weekly Aldermere–Hazelton stagecoach operated. That year, the first automobile traversed the valley, en route from Seattle to Hazelton.

=== Railway and highway ===
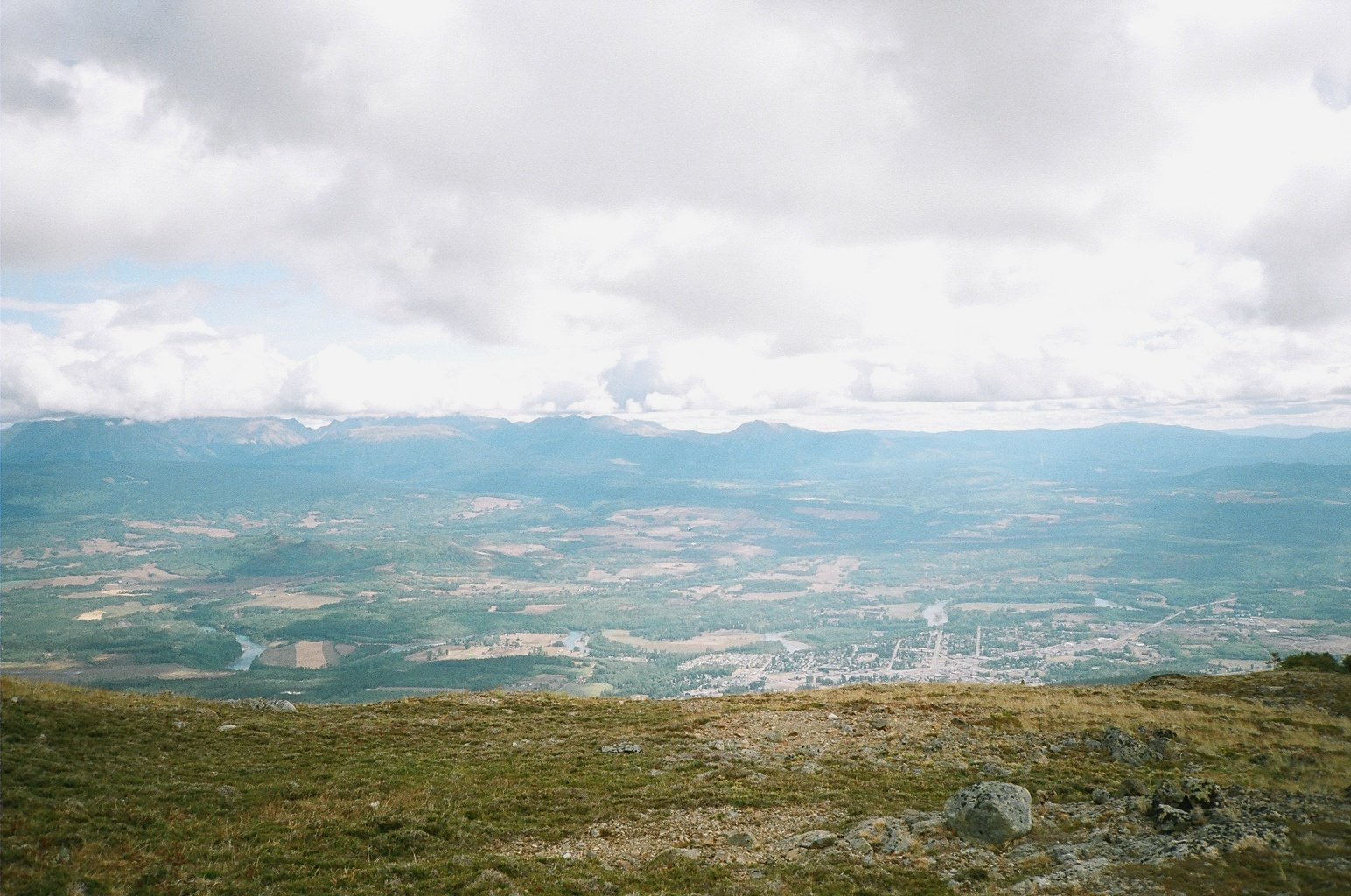
Looking east across the Bulkley Valley from the top of the Hudson Bay Mountain Ski Area. The town of Smithers is visible in the lower right.

The anticipated railway link would remove many of the obstacles to growth. Foley, Welch and Stewart (FW&S) began eastward construction of the Grand Trunk Pacific Railway (GTP) from Prince Rupert in 1908, reaching the valley in 1912. The GTP had initially considered routing through the Telkwa Pass, 80 miles (130 km) shorter, largely bypassing the valley and the then major centre of Hazelton. That year forest fires raged through the valley destroying crops, farm buildings and equipment as far west as Telkwa and Aldermere.

The start of World War I saw land prices plummet, and settlers abandoning their properties. In 1917, a BC government initiative encouraged settlers and returning war veterans to establish farms in undeveloped areas. To this end, 24,000 acres were set aside in the valley, with conditions to deter speculation. In 1919, the United Grain Growers (UGG) purchased 7,000 acres of the Rattenbury land, bringing sales to 32,000 acres, largely in the valley. At the time, his company owned 500,000 acres across the region. In 1927, his unsold holdings largely reverted to the government.

Upgrading the road from Prince George to Hazelton with gravel was completed in 1925. This route was designated Highway 16, which reached as far west as Cedarvale in 1942. US assistance was invaluable in reconstructing the final section to Prince Rupert in 1944, creating in places a narrow road wedged between the Skeena and railway tracks. Widening and paving came in the mid-to-late 1960s.

=== Mining ===
At Goathorn Creek near Telkwa, the McNeil mine began coal extraction in 1918, producing 14–45 tons daily. Opened in 1930, Bulkley Valley Collieries became the dominant player, increasing to about 9,000 tons per year during the late 1940s and early 1950s. The Gething mine produced just over 15,000 tonnes from its underground operations of 1972–1986.

A 1929 pamphlet lists numerous undeveloped, dormant and active gold, silver, copper, zinc, lead and coal claims in the vicinity of the Telkwa River, Owen Lake, Topley, Houston, Mineral Hill, Grouse Mountain, Deep Creek, Dome Mountain, Babine Range, and Hudson Bay Mountain. Cronin Mine (primarily silver), 30 miles (48 km) from Telkwa/Smithers, was active 1909–1924. Opened in 1922, Duthie Mines (primarily silver), 15 miles (24 km) from Smithers, extracted $227,500 worth in 1928, but operations ceased in 1930. During the following decades, all mining of precious metals was modest.

The open pit Huckleberry Mine, 123 kilometres (76 mi) southwest of Houston, opened in 1997. Owing to low copper and molybdenite prices, production ceased in 2016. At the time, Huckleberry employed 260 people, 80 percent from Bulkley Valley communities. In 2015, the last full year of production, the mill processed 20,000 tonnes of ore per day, producing more than 43 million lbs of copper, 3,500 ounces of gold, and 206,000 ounces of silver.

== Economy ==
The forest industry has remained dominant. Agriculture has comprised dairy and beef ranching, with opportunities for large-scale greenhouse operations. Tourism resources offer fishing, hunting, and hiking in spectacular terrain. Potential exists for expanding the mining industry, but residents oppose any new coal mines.

== Communities ==
Location & history				P.O.^{a}	Active station/flag stop^{c}						
Subdivision	Mile	Station Name			1913–15	Rename	1916–17	Rename	1918–c. 1962	c.1962–c.1969	c.1969 onward
Telkwa	58.9	Bulkley			yes	Forestdale	yes		yes	yes	no
Telkwa	66.6	Topley		^{b}	yes		yes		yes	yes	no
Telkwa	72.9	Perow			yes		yes		yes	yes	no
Telkwa	80.1	Quick	^{e}		yes	Knockholt	yes		yes	no	no
Telkwa	85.1	Houston	^{d}	^{b}	yes		yes		yes	yes	yes
Telkwa	91.4	Barrett			yes		yes		yes	yes	no
Telkwa	98.8	Walcott			yes		yes		yes	yes	no
Telkwa	107.1	Knockholt	^{e}		yes	Quick	yes		yes	yes	no
Telkwa	112.8	Hubert			yes		yes		yes	no	no
Telkwa	^{f}	Aldermere									
Telkwa	116.0	Telkwa	^{d}	^{b}	no		yes		yes	yes	yes
Telkwa	119.4	Tatlow			yes		no		yes	no	no
Bulkley	125.2; 0.0	Smithers	^{d}	^{b}	yes		yes		yes	yes	yes
Bulkley	3.6	Lake Kathlyn			yes		yes		yes	no	no
Bulkley	9.1	Evelyn			yes		yes		yes	yes	no
Bulkley	15.5	Doughty			yes		yes		yes	no	no
Bulkley	21.9	Moricetown	^{d}˙^{g}		yes		yes		yes	yes	no
Bulkley	27.3	Seaton			yes		yes		yes	yes	no
Bulkley	31.9	Beament			yes		yes		yes	no	no
Bulkley	39.4	Duncanan			yes		no	Bulkley Canyon	yes	yes	no

^a. Post office may have neither shared same name as station, nor been in close proximity.
^b. Post office currently operates.
^c. Extracted from railway timetables. Some stops opened in late 1912. Most communities have dispersed, some prior to the respective stop closure.
^d. Main communities.
^e. Unclear why names switched.
^f. Former community, but not a station.
^g. Renamed Witset in 2018.

== See also ==
- Skeena-Bulkley Valley Federal Electoral District
- Bulkey Valley-Stikine Provincial Electoral District
- Passenger train service
