= Killing of Jared Lowndes =

2021 killing by law enforcement in Canada

On July 8, 2021, Jared Lowndes, a 38-year-old member of the Wetʼsuwetʼen First Nation, was fatally shot by Royal Canadian Mounted Police officers in Campbell River, British Columbia. In late 2022, the British Columbia Independent Investigations Office released a statement that the officers "may have committed offences in relation to various uses of force" and is preparing a report to submit to Crown Counsel. The identities of the three RCMP officers involved in the shooting have not yet been made public.

== Persons involved ==
=== Jared Lowndes ===
Jared Lowndes, a member of the Wetʼsuwetʼen First Nations, was 38 years old at the time of his death. He had two children and also had familial ties to the Homalco First Nation. He spent most of his life in Vancouver, but had lived in Campbell River for six years at the time of his death. He had previously alleged harassment and mistreatment by the RCMP; in January 2021 he wrote an open letter alleging that he had been denied food and subjected to degrading conditions in custody in North Fraser Pretrial detention, and that he was worried the RCMP were going to kill him. His conviction and detention in 2020 related to firearms offenses from 2013.

=== Unidentified RCMP officers ===
At least 3 officers of the Campbell River RCMP were involved in the shooting. However, their identity has not yet been published by the RCMP or the Independent Investigations Office. Even basic facts such as how many officers opened fire have not yet been released.

== Event ==
The killing of Jared Lowndes took place on the morning of July 8, 2021, in Campbell River, British Columbia, a town located on the east coast of Vancouver Island. Before 5:30 am, an unidentified Campbell River RCMP officer approached a stopped Audi vehicle driven by Lowndes, who drove away after the Audi and police cruiser hit each other. At around 9:00 am, a larger group of RCMP, who had been called for by dispatch, approached Lowndes' car again outside a Tim Hortons restaurant on the South Island Highway; they later stated that they were pursuing an outstanding warrant for him. Lowndes once again attempted to leave, but was blocked from doing so.

The police then confronted Lowndes using a police dog after Lowndes allegedly used bear spray on approaching officers; Lowndes' relatives later alleged that he also had a young dog in the car with him. One of the officers retrieved a police dog known as Gator from a police vehicle and lifted him into the Audi. Lowndes is alleged by the RCMP to have then grabbed a knife from the passenger seat and started stabbing the dog. The officer reached in and was also stabbed, resulting in cuts and wounds on the officer’s left hand. A standoff ensued, with one officer allegedly climbing on top of a police vehicle and “aiming their firearm down at Mr. Lowndes through the front windshield while continuing to yell commands,” the statement says. The RCMP alleges that Lowndes could be heard saying things to the effect of “You’re going to have to fucking kill me”. A Taser was then used, but Lowndes allegedly used his knife to cut away the wires. He then allegedly moved to the passenger side of the vehicle, opened the door and pushed out the dog, which died of his injuries. Lowndes, still holding the knife, is alleged to have gotten out of the vehicle, yelling “shoot me, kill me.” Officers then shot Lowndes twice in the back; he died at the scene. Family members have stated in the press that he was shot in the face.

== Aftermath ==
=== Official investigations ===
==== Independent Investigations Office of BC ====
On the same day Lowndes was killed, the Independent Investigations Office, which is mandated to look into police use of force in British Columbia, launched an investigation led by Chief Civilian Director Ronald J. MacDonald. In December 2022 they released a statement that "reasonable grounds exist to believe that three officers may have committed offences in relation to various uses of force. As a result, and pursuant to Section 38.11 of the Police Act, the IIO is preparing a report to be submitted to the BC Prosecution Service for consideration of charges in the coming months." The IIO completed its report in October 2023 and forwarded its findings to the British Columbia Prosecution Service which will consider filing charges against the officers. Most of the details remain private, but the IIO has stated that it still believes the 3 officers may have committed offenses and could be charged.

The British Columbia Prosecution Service announced on April 23, 2024 that it has decided not to lay charges against three Mounties involved in the shooting death. The service stated that the “available evidence” wouldn’t suffice to prove beyond a reasonable doubt that three Campbell River RCMP officers “committed any offence” related to the 38-year-old man’s death. Though B.C.‘s Independent Investigations Office had suggested the service may want to consider manslaughter charges against one officer and assault charges against the others, the prosecution service says it would be unable to prove the force used was unreasonable or disproportionate, as evidence supports a reasonable belief that Lowndes proved a risk of death or grievous bodily harm to both the arresting officers and the public in the Tim Hortons parking lot. "While there are exceptionally few scenarios in which it would be an appropriate and proportionate response to deploy a police dog into a vehicle, the Crown would be unable to prove that [the dog handler's] decision was unreasonable in the unique threat matrix faced by the officers during this arrest," the BCPS statement reads.

=== Community reactions ===
Days after the killing, the First Nations Leadership Council released a statement condemning it and calling for accountability from the RCMP. Grand Chief Stewart Phillip called it the latest in a number of racist and dehumanizing killings of Indigenous people in the province. The National Police Federation, on the other hand, released a statement that Lowndes would still be alive if he had complied with police orders. This was condemned by community activists, as well as the fact that the RCMP had commemorated the death of the police dog but not Lowndes himself.

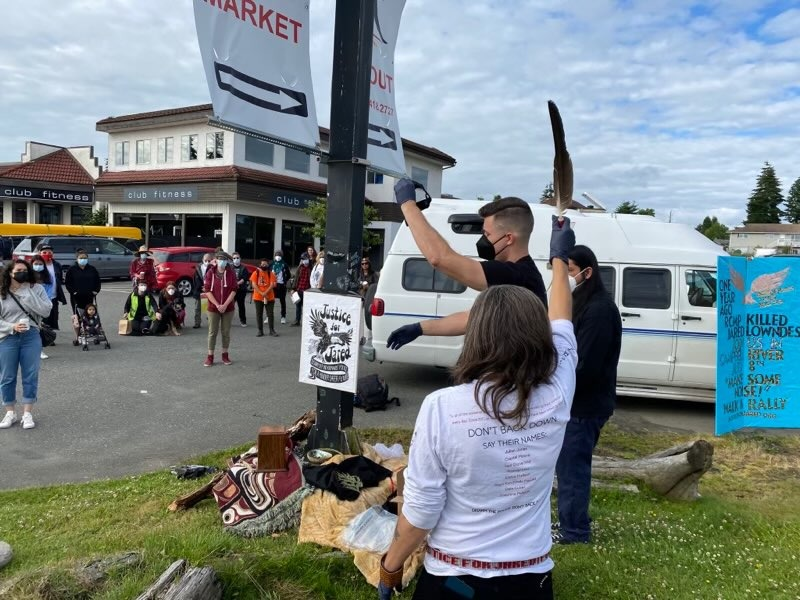
A demonstration in Campbell River on the anniversary of Lowndes' death

Lowndes' friends and family have become the main advocates for his cause after his killing. His mother, Laura Holland, has been a key activist; she publicly described him as a loving man who did not deserve to die the way he did. Holland has called for a public inquest into her son's death and for the introduction of police body cameras in British Columbia. Ketisha Hackett, the mother of Lowndes' children, has also spoken publicly about his killing, stating that it was cruel and unnecessary. Activists and critics also condemned the over-reliance on police dogs and the RCMP's rapid escalation to using deadly force in interactions with the public. Activists staged a protest in Campbell River on the anniversary of Lowndes' death, which ended outside the Campbell River RCMP building. For their part, the RCMP alleged that criminal elements were involved in the protest and that they were launching an investigation into it.

Holland released a statement after the IIO's December 2022 press release, stating that the IIO's decision affirmed what she and her family already knew about the wrongness of the RCMP officers' actions. Organizations such as the Pivot Legal Society and the British Columbia Civil Liberties Association expressed their support for the IIO's decision as well. However, advocates also stated that they were losing faith in the IIO, which already had multiple investigations open about the Campbell River RCMP with few consequences and no apparent change in policing techniques. Holland and other family members participated in a memorial art event at Gallery Gachet in Vancouver in March 2023. A website Justice For Jared was also created to draw attention to his case.
