= Wetʼsuwetʼen =

First Nations people of British Columbia, Canada

Coordinates: 55°15′00″N 127°40′00″W

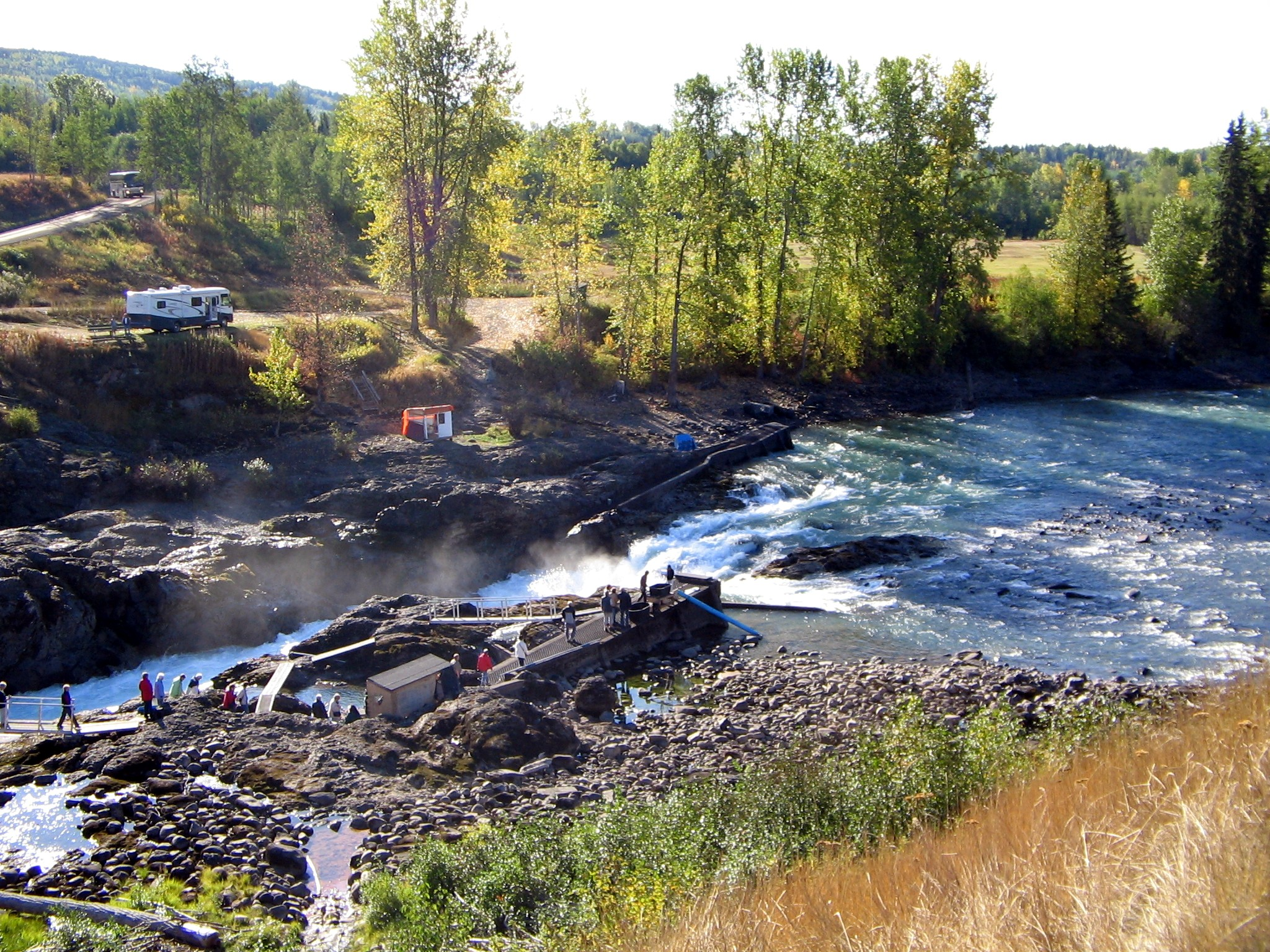

Total population
- approx. 3,160 (2019)

Regions with significant populations
- Canada (British Columbia)

Languages
- English, Babine-Witsuwitʼen

Religion
- Indigenous religion

Related ethnic groups
- Other Dene peoples Especially Tsilhqotʼin, Dakelh, and Babine

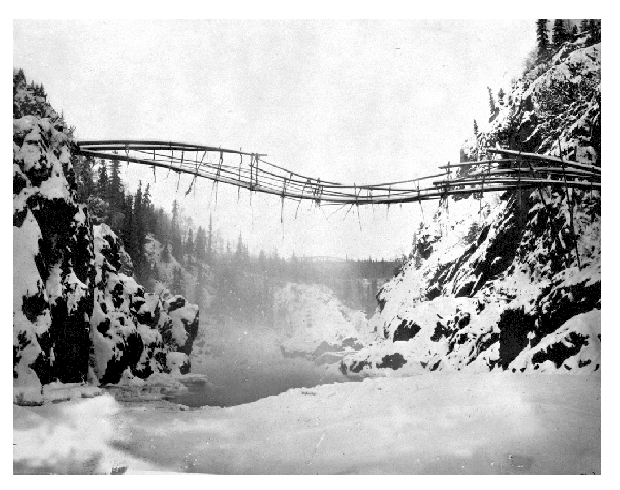
The Wetʼsuwetʼen's bridge across the Bulkley River, Hagwilget, 1872

Map showing the rough location of traditional Wetʼsuwetʼen territory in western Canada

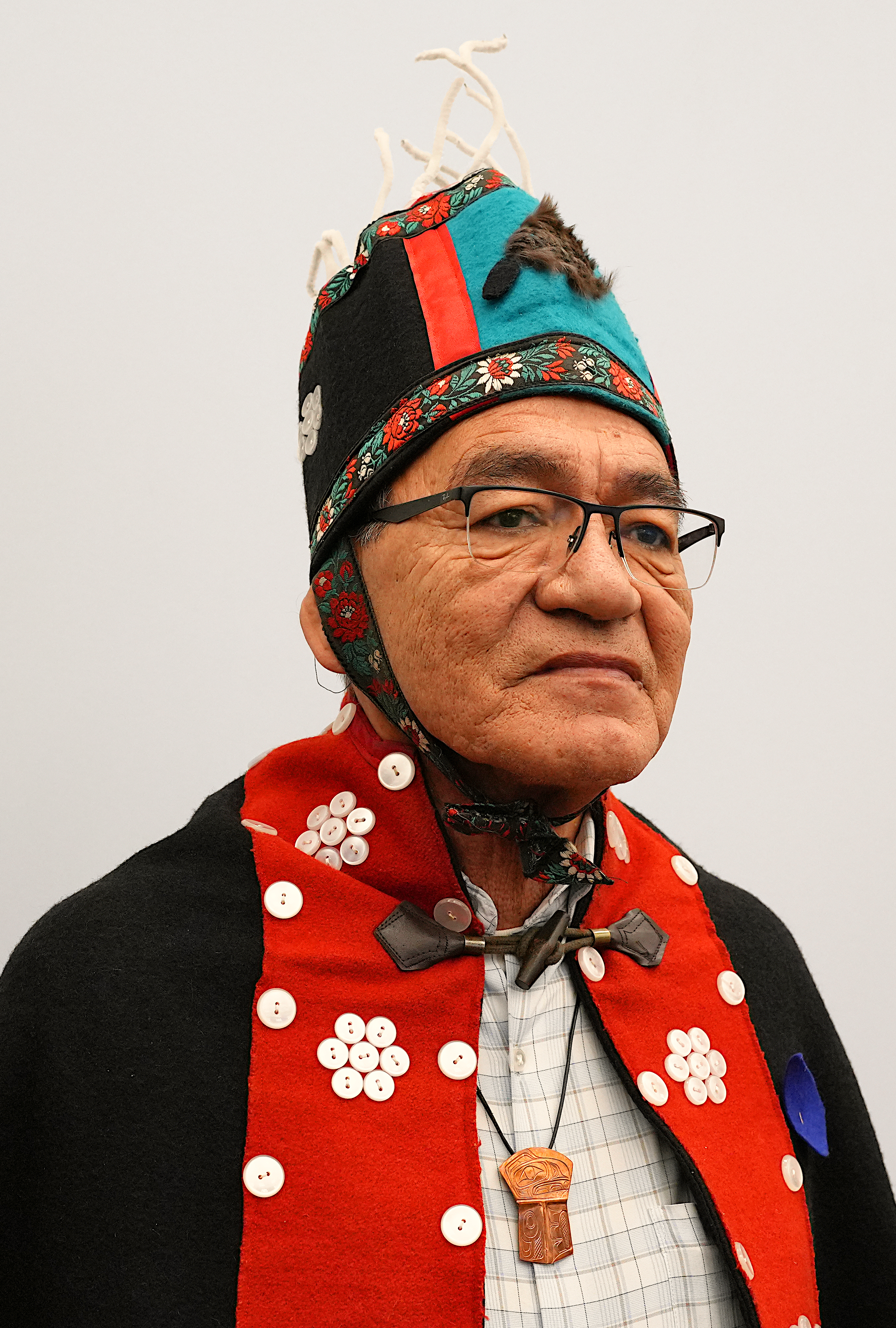
Hereditary Chief NaʼMoks of the Wetʼsuwetʼen Nation in ceremonial clothing in late‑2024

The Wetʼsuwetʼen are a First Nation who live on the Bulkley River and around Burns Lake, Broman Lake, and François Lake in the northwestern Central Interior of British Columbia.

The Wetʼsuwetʼen are a branch of the Dakelh or Carrier people, and in combination with the Babine people have been referred to as the Western Carrier. They speak Witsuwitʼen, a dialect of the Babine-Witsuwitʼen language which, like its sister language Carrier, is a member of the Athabaskan family.

Their oral history, called kungax, recounts that their ancestral village, Dizkle or Dzilke, once stood upstream from the Bulkley Canyon. This cluster of cedar houses on both sides of the river is said to have been abandoned because of an omen of impending disaster. The exact location of the village has been lost. The neighbouring Gitxsan people of the Hazelton area have a similar tale, though the village in their version is named Dimlahamid (Temlahan).

== Name ==
The word Wetʼsuwetʼen (English: /wɛtˈsoʊɪtɪn/ wet-SOH-ih-tin) is spelled in numerous ways. Witsuwitʼen is the correct spelling in the writing system in general use. In non-technical publications, it is usually misspelled as Witsʼuwitʼen, Witʼsuwitʼen, Wetsʼuwetʼen, or Wetʼsuwetʼen due to the difficulty of distinguishing ejective [ts] from plain [ts]. Official spellings with <tʼs> are used in the names of the Wetʼsuwetʼen First Nation and the Office of the Wetʼsuwetʼen. In point of fact the [ts] is not ejective. Older spellings include Hotsotʼen and Hwotsotʼen. Whutsowhutʼen is the Carrier name in the Carrier Linguistic Committee writing system in general use for that language.

The endonym Wetʼsuwetʼen means "People of the Wa Dzun Kwuh River (Bulkley River)".

== Clans ==
In the traditional Wetʼsuwetʼen governance system, there are five clans, which are further subdivided into 13 house groups. Each house group is led by a single house chief, and also includes several sub-chiefs (also referred to as "wing chiefs"). Hereditary chief names (both house chiefs and sub-chiefs) are usually passed on to a successor chosen by the incumbent name holder, more often than not through family lines. Clan membership is Matrilineal, passed from mother to children. In Witsuwit'en, male hereditary chiefs are referred to as dinï zeʼ, and female hereditary chiefs are referred to as tsʼakë zeʼ.

The house groups and house chiefs of each of the five clans, as well as the English names of the current house chiefs, can be found in the chart below.

Gilseyhu (Big Frog Clan)
House group	Translation	House chief name	Incumbent
Yex Tʼsa Witʼantʼ	Thin House	Goohlaht	vacant
Yex Tʼsa Wilkʼus	Dark House	Knedebeas	Warner William
Kayex	Birchbark House	Samooh	Herb Naziel

Laksilyu (Small Frog Clan)
House group	Translation	House chief name	Incumbent
Kwen Beegh Yex	House Beside the Fire	Wah Tah Kwets	vacant
Gʼen Egh La Yex	House of Many Eyes	Hagwilnegh	Ron Mitchell
Tsee Kʼal Kʼe Yex	House on a Flat Rock	Wah Tah Kʼeght	vacant

Tsayu (Beaver Clan)
House group	Translation	House chief name	Incumbent
Djakanyex	Beaver House	Kweese	vacant
Tsa Kʼen Yex	Rafters on Beaver House	Naʼmoks	John Ridsdale (Note: See thumbnail image on right.)

Laksamshu (Fireweed and Owl Clan)
House group	Translation	House chief name	Incumbent
Medzeyex	Owl House	Kloum Khun	Alphonse Gagnon
Tsalyex	Sun House	Smogelgem	Warner Naziel

Gitdumden (Wolf and Bear Clan)
House group	Translation	House chief name	Incumbent
Cassyex	Grizzly House	Woos	Frank Alec
Kalyexwenits	House in the Middle of Many	Gisdayʼwa	Fred Tom
Anaskasi	Where it Lies Blocking the Trail	Madeek	Sherri Green

*Unist'ot'en Camp Group is affiliated with the Yex T'sa Wilk'us (Dark House) under the Gilseyhu (Big Frog) Clan.

== Wetʼsuwetʼen First Nation bands ==
=== History ===
In 1960, the Decker Lake, François Lake (later Nee-Tahi-Buhn), Maxim Lake and Skin Tyee Bands merged to form the Omineca Band. In 1984, the Omineca Band divided into the Nee-Tahi-Buhn and Browman (or Broman) Lake Bands, the latter of which later became Wetʼsuwetʼen First Nation. In 2000, the Skin Tyee Band separated from the Nee-Tahi-Buhn Band.

=== Contemporary First Nation bands ===
The following two First Nations are members of the Carrier-Sekani Tribal Council:

- Wetʼsuwetʼen First Nation - also known as Browman (or Broman) Lake, formerly as Browman Indian Lake Band, located outside of Burns Lake, British Columbia.
- Ts'il Kaz Koh First Nation - also known as Burns Lake, located around Burns Lake, British Columbia.

The following four First Nations are not affiliated with any tribal council:

- Hagwilget Village First Nation - located in the village of Hagwilget (meaning "place of the gentle or quiet people" in Gitxsan), also known as Tse-kya ("base of rock"), on the east side of the Bulkley Canyon, near Hazelton, British Columbia, about 325 kilometres inland from the coast.
- Nee-Tahi-Buhn Band - formerly called François Lake Tribe. Nee-Tahi-Buhn is the Babine-Witsuwitʼen name for François Lake, and means "it fills at one end and empties at the other".
- Skin Tyee First Nation - also known as the Skin Tyee Indian Band, also spelled "Skin Tayi", located near François Lake, in the Omineca Country to the west of the City of Prince George, British Columbia.
- Witset First Nation - also known as Moricetown Band, located in Witset, British Columbia.

== Office of the Wetʼsuwetʼen ==
The Office of the Hereditary Chiefs of the Wetʼsuwetʼen, also known as the Office of the Wetʼsuwetʼen or the OW, is a political organization governed by the hereditary chiefs of the Wetʼsuwetʼen people, based in Smithers, British Columbia. The Office takes part in the BC Treaty Process through the two Indian Act band governments (Hagwilget and Witset First Nations) which contain the 13 hereditary chieftaincies. The Office is not a tribal council, nor a traditional governing body, but rather a non-profit society, directed by a Board of Directors, with the goal of being a central office of the Wetʼsuwetʼen Nation. It was founded as an independent office in 1994, after the splitting of the Gitxsan-Wet’suwet’en Tribal Council, which had represented the two nations during Delgamuukw v British Columbia.

As of April 2020, the board of directors was composed of seven house chiefs (Naʼmoks, Knedebeas, Madeek, Samooh, Kloum Khun, Wah Tah Kʼeght, and Hagwilnegh).

As of 2009, the organization was at stage four of the BC Treaty Process.

On May 14, 2020, the governments of Canada and British Columbia signed a Memorandum of Understanding (MOU) with the hereditary chiefs of the Wet’suwet’en, in which the Canadian and B.C. governments "recognize that Wet’suwet’en rights and title are held by Wet’suwet’en houses under their system of governance". Following concerns by leaders of the band councils, the hereditary chiefs clarified that the Office of the Wetʼsuwetʼen is not a governing body, and that the authority of the band councils under the MOU would not be diminished.

== In culture ==
- Yintah – 2024 documentary film showing resistance by the Wetʼsuwetʼen Nation to a pipeline being built through their traditional territory

== See also ==
- Delgamuukw v British Columbia
- 2020 Canadian pipeline and railway protests
- Killing of Jared Lowndes
