= Morice River =

Coordinates: 54.4106°N 126.7464°W

- Location of mouth
- Native name: Wedzin Kwa (Babine)

Location
- Country: Canada
- Provinces: British Columbia

The Morice River (Babine-Witsuwitʼen: Wedzin Kwa) is the outflow of Morice Lake southwest of Houston, British Columbia, Canada. Morice Lake and Morice River are named after Father Adrien-Gabriel Morice. The Morice has many small creeks joining it along its length, but retains the clear glacial hue for its length. The Morice River continues on to the town of Houston, at which point the river is joined by a small tributary river called the Little Bulkley River, and the two rivers joined become the Bulkley River. They become the Bulkley, not the Morice, despite the fact that the Morice is larger. This was done by Poudrier, a government cartographer who, it is rumoured, never saw the region.

== Status ==
The Morice River was listed as the sixth-most endangered river in British Columbia due to the proposed Enbridge Northern Gateway Pipelines which would have carried diluted bitumen. The report was issued by the Outdoor Recreation Council of British Columbia. The Northern Gateway Pipeline did not make substantial progress following approval with 209 conditions. Subsequently the approval was quashed by the courts.

The Morice River is also crossed by the approved Coastal GasLink Pipeline which will carry natural gas. Some hereditary chiefs of the Wetʼsuwetʼen oppose the pipeline on the grounds that it will disrupt salmon populations and decrease water quality. The crossing of the Morice is planned to be accomplished by trenchless crossing, though crossing of tributaries are not using this method, leading to concern of increased turbidity. The Wet'suwet'en name for the Morice river is Wet-zuhn-kwa.

The Coastal Gaslink company reported two spills of clay lubricant while tunneling on April 12 2023, one on land and the other in a small tributary west of the Morice River. Coastal Gaslink later said in an email that the size of the spills and what caused them were still being investigated, and that the clay was non-toxic with no expected impact on fish or waterways.

== See also ==
- List of rivers of British Columbia
