= Witset =

Wet'suwet'en village in British Columbia, Canada

Coordinates: 55°02′N 127°20′W

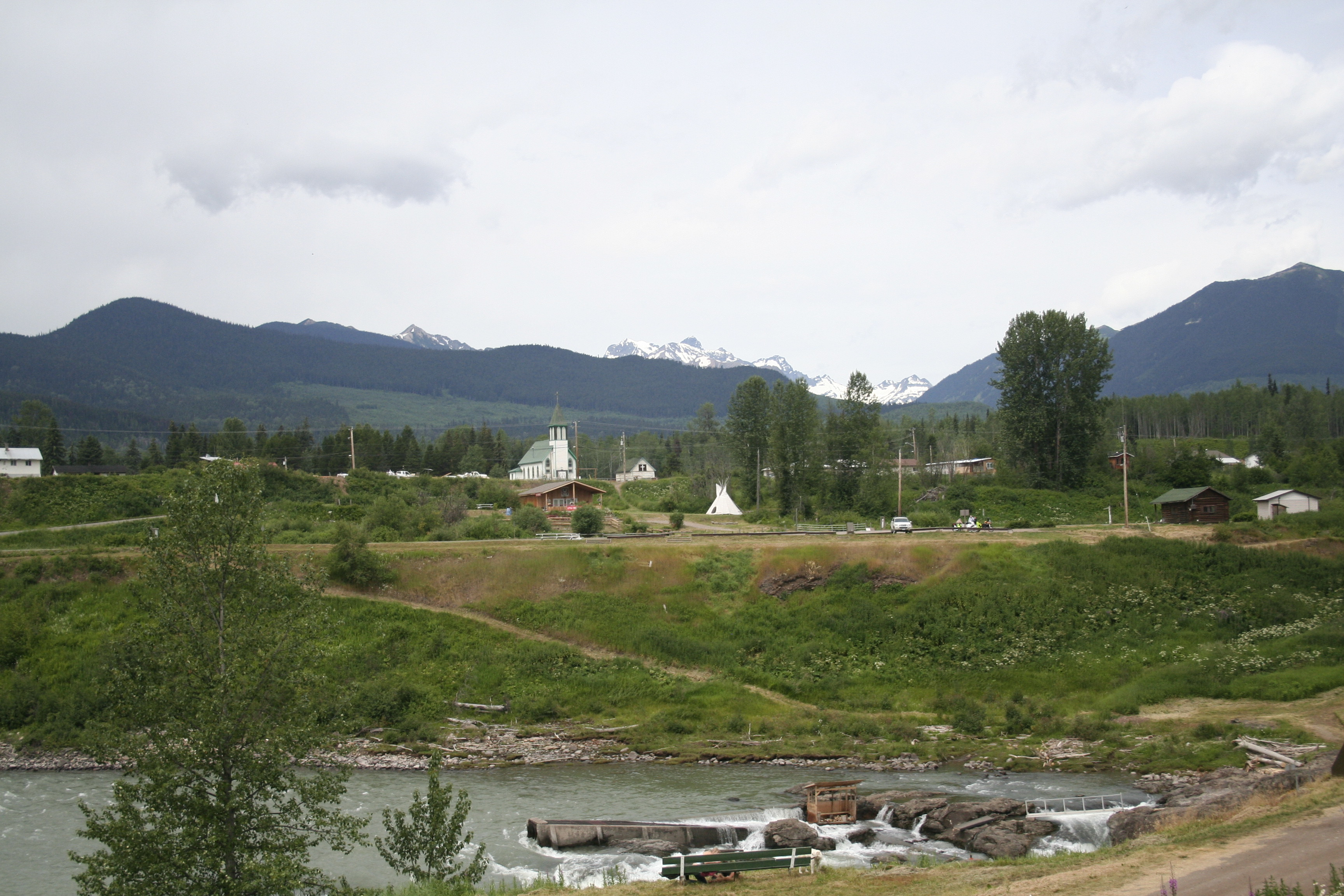
Witset lies near Widzin Kwah (the Bulkley River).

Witset (formerly Moricetown) is a Wet'suwet'en village in Central British Columbia, Canada on the west side of the Bulkley River on Coryatsaqua (Moricetown) Indian Reserve No. 2, and on Moricetown Indian Reserve No.1. The current village was built during the early twentieth century. Evidence of inhabitation dates back to around 5,500 years ago.

== Name ==
The original name of the village was Witset. It was abandoned after a rockslide that prevented salmon from reaching the canyon. Witsuwit'en people then settled in Tsë Cakh (Hagwilget) and referred to the old village as Këyikh Wigit (often spelled Kyah Wiget).

It was renamed after the pioneer missionary Father Adrien-Gabriel Morice, who named the village after himself, and was admonished by the church for doing so.

On May 5, 2018, the community officially reverted to its original name, Witset. The community’s name now means something akin to “first” or “the people of the first village.” The name change came about in part through the work of Wanda Nikal, a Wet'suwet'en woman who organized a petition over the issue. In September 2017, the Band Council voted in favour of the name change.

== Facts ==
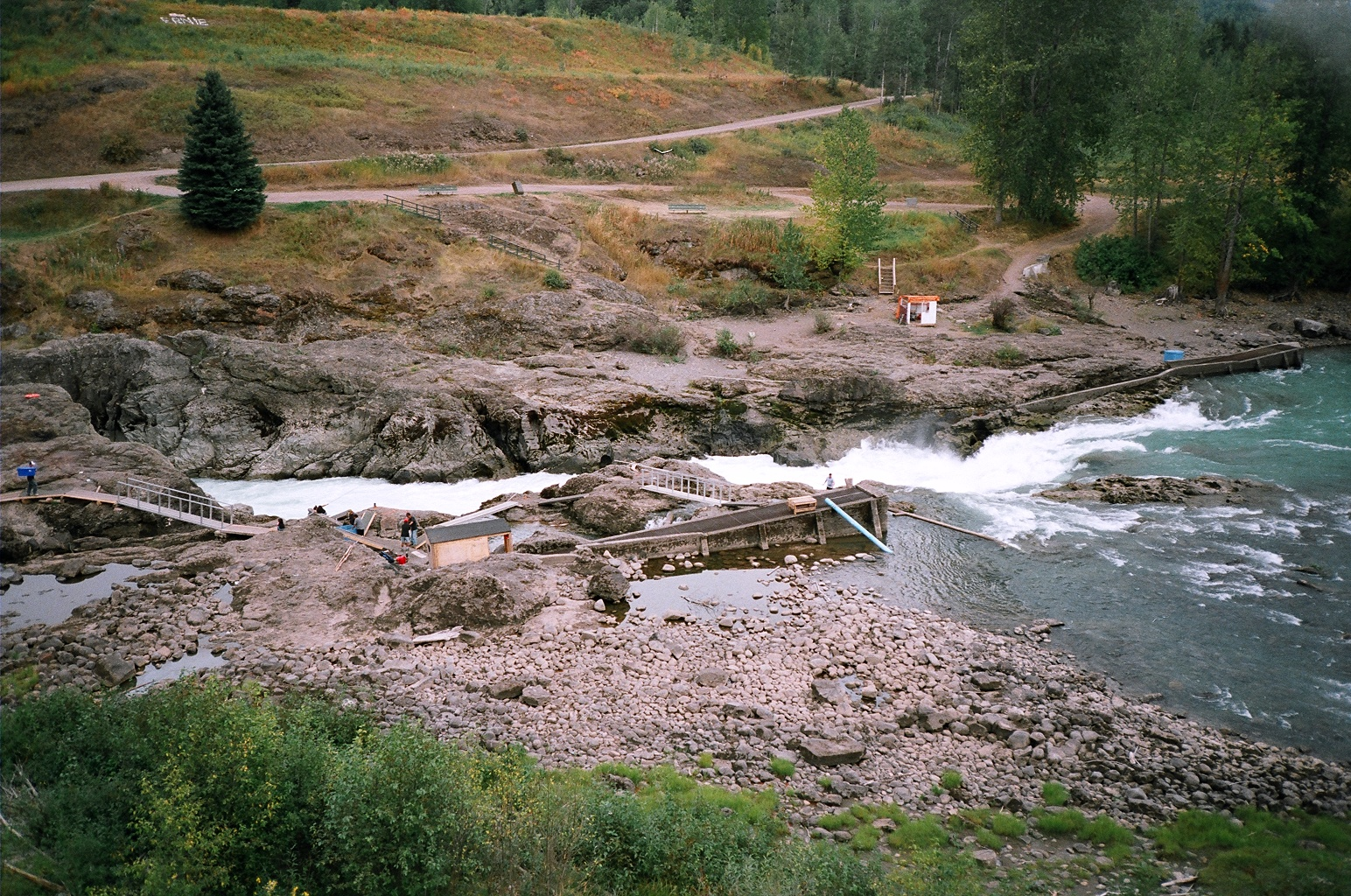
Wet'suwet'en fishing site on Bulkley River at Moricetown Canyon

- Population: Approximately 815 on-reserve, Approximately, 800 off-reserve, throughout B.C. and Canada
- Government: The traditional governing system is the feast system, related in concept to the potlatch of coastal peoples; however, the Wet'suwet'en people do currently have the elected Band Council system as well.
- Location: Halfway between Smithers and New Hazelton, 31 km from each town. Straddles the Trans-Canada Yellowhead 16 Highway, along the Bulkley River Valley. The river plunges through a narrow gorge, tumbling down a series of rushing waterfalls, and salmon are plentiful.

== Culture ==
The village celebrates the traditional feast system, made up of five clans: the Big Frog, Small Frog, Beaver, Wolf/Bear, and Fireweed clans. However, fewer than 15% speak the Wet'suwet'en language and less than 5% understand the language without speaking it. The Band is known as the Moricetown Band, and it is currently participating in the British Columbia Treaty Process. The Moricetown Band is a separate body from the Office of the Wetsuwet'en that leads the majority of treaty negotiations. The culture of the Wetsuwet'en is in danger of being lost. School District #54 (Bulkley Valley), in partnership with Kyah Wiget Education Society and the Witsuwit'en Language Authority, has taken steps to help the Wetsuwet'en to preserve their culture by publishing their history in a textbook for grades 7–12 titled "Niwhts’ide’nï Hibi’it’ën: The Ways of Our Ancestors" (2011). Additionally, the Moricetown Elementary School teaches language and integrates members of the community in its program to keep the culture alive.

== Community resources ==
The Witset Multiplex is a grand design that includes the Band office, the community gym/feast hall, and school. There is an office available for the RCMP to use when they come into the community. The Office of the Hereditary Chiefs operates the Wet’suwet’en Unlocking Aboriginal Justice (WUAJ) program in conjunction with the Smithers Royal Canadian Mounted Police department. The WUAJ Program has been in place since 1995, offering an Alternative Justice Program for first-time, non-violent First Nations offenders. The WUAJ office is in the chief's office in Smithers, B.C.

A Witsuwit'en Language Authority created by fluent speakers of Witsuwit'en and creating innovative ways to engage with nonfluent speakers and starting early learning in schools and homes.

== Industry ==
- Kyahwood Forest Products JV is a 58,000 sq ft (5,400 m^{2}). wood and lumber plant. It is a joint venture including the Band as 51% shareholder, and Northwood Incorporated holding the remaining 49%. The plant employs 75 local residents and can produce up to 26 million bfm lumber when operating at peak capacity.
- Kyah Industries Ltd. is a spin-off business which has the first opportunity to accept harvest rights from the band’s timber award. Some 75,500 cubic metres is harvested annually. This logging company employs 12 people and owns equipment.

== Other Wet'suwet'en communities ==
Other Wet'suwet'en communities include the Burns Lake Indian Band, Wet'suwet'en First Nation (formerly known as Broman Lake Band), and Hagwilget Village.
