= Hagwilget Village First Nation =

Wetʼsuwetʼen band government in British Columbia, Canada

Hagwilget First Nation Government
- Band No. 534
- Location of the Hagwilget First Nation within British Columbia
- People: Wetʼsuwetʼen
- Headquarters: New Hazelton
- Province: British Columbia

Land
- Main reserve: Hagwilget 1
- Reserve: Bulkley 1
- Land area: 1.586 km^{2} (0.612 sq mi)

Population (2020)
- On reserve: 201
- On other land: 30
- Off reserve: 567
- Total population: 798

Government
- Chief: Sheila Joseph
- Council: Debra Kenni; John Wilson; Brian Michell; Mike Ridsdale

Website
- http://www.hagwilget.com/

The Hagwilget Village Council is a First Nations band government of the Wetʼsuwetʼen subgroup of the Dakelh people, located at Hagwilget, British Columbia, Canada, which is just east of Hazelton, British Columbia. The band is one of the 13 member governments of the Hereditary Chiefs of the Wetʼsuwetʼen, which functions as a tribal council in alliance with the 35 members of the Hereditary Chiefs of the Gitxsan.

== Chief and Councillors ==
| Position | Name | Term start | Term end | Reference |
|---|---|---|---|---|
| Chief | Sheila Joseph | 08/31/2025 | 08/30/2027 | |

== Demographics ==
INAC number 534, the Hagwilget Village First Nation had 694 members as of July 2009.
