= Witset First Nation =

- Band No. 530
- Witset
- Witset First Nation within traditional Wetʼsuwetʼen territory
- People: Wetʼsuwetʼen
- Headquarters: 205 Beaver Road, Smithers, British Columbia V0J 2N1
- Province: British Columbia

Land
- Main reserve: Moricetown 1
- Reserves: List: Babine 17; Babine 18; Bulkley River 19; Coryatsaqua (Moricetown) 2; Jean Baptiste 28; Oschawwinna 3
- Land area: 14.27 km^{2} (5.51 sq mi)

Population (2024)
- On reserve: 651
- On other land: 65
- Off reserve: 1429
- Total population: 2145

Government
- Chief: Elgin Cutler
- Council: 2023–25: Elgin Cutler; Butch (Francis) Dennis; Sandra George; Sherri Green; Victor Jim; Sherry McKinnon; Duane Mitchell; Kayla Mitchell; Charmayne Nikal; Andrew Tom; Jerry William Sr; Warner William

Website
- witset.ca

The Witset First Nation is a First Nations band government of the Wet'suwet'en people of Witset, British Columbia, Canada. Their mailing address is in Smithers, but their main community is at Witset.

== Indian reserves ==
Indian reserves governed by the band are:

- Babine Indian Reserve No. 17, between Moricetown IR No. 1 and Coryatsqua IR No. 2, south of the Moricetown CNR station, 64.80 ha.
- Babine Indian Reserve No. 18, on Corya Creek, one mile west of the Moricetown CNR station, 259 ha.
- Bulkley River Indian Reserve No. 19, on the left bank of the Bulkley River north of and adjoining Moricetown IR No. 1, 242.80 ha.
- Coryatsaqua (Moricetown) Indian Reserve No. 2, on the Smithers-Hazelton Road, the Moricetown CNR station is on this reserve, 126.40 ha.
- Jean Baptiste Indian Reserve No. 28, about 6 miles southeasterly from the Smithers CNR station, 129.50 ha.
- Moricetown Indian Reserve No. 1, on the Bulkley River 28 miles southeasterly from Hazelton, 539.50 ha.
- Oschawwinna Indian Reserve No. 3, on the Bulkley River Road, about 3 miles southeasterly from Moricetown IR No. 1, 65.0 ha.
