= Tsʼil Kaz Koh First Nation =

First Nation in British Columbia, Canada

Burns Lake
- Band No. 619
- Tsʼil Kaz Koh
- Location of Tsʼil Kaz Koh in traditional Wetʼsuwetʼen territory within British Columbia, Canada
- People: Dene
- Headquarters: BAG 9000, Burns Lake, BC V0J 1E0
- Province: British Columbia

Land
- Main reserve: Burns Lake 18
- Reserves: Poison Creek 17; Poison Creek 17A; Sheraton Creek 19
- Land area: 1.846 km^{2} (0.713 sq mi)

Population (2020)
- On reserve: 44
- On other land: 2
- Off reserve: 101
- Total population: 147

Government
- Chief: Wes Sam
- Council: Sarah Green; Ellen Lorentz

Tribal Council
- Carrier-Sekani Tribal Council

Website
- http://www.burnslakeband.ca/

Tsʼil Kaz Koh First Nation or the Burns Lake Indian Band is a Wetsuweten band government whose main community is located on Burns Lake, near the divide between the Bulkley and Nechako River basins, approximately 220 km west of Prince George, British Columbia, Canada. Tsʼil Kaz Koh as a name is derived from the Carrier name for the creek that runs through the area. The band has four reserves, totalling about 184.6 hectares, and as of August 2007, they had 114 band members. As of 2013, the Burns Lake Band has about 129 members on and off reserve.

Tsʼil Kaz Koh is a member of the Carrier Sekani Tribal Council. The Burns Lake Band offices are located at 653 Highway 16 west in Burns Lake, BC.

== Chief and Council ==
One chief and two councillors are elected by the band members in elections which are held every four years, usually in the month of October. A by-election can happen at any point in order to replace either the chief or a councillor for the remainder of the term. The next election is set for 2028. The current chief and counsel consist of the following,

- Chief Wesley Sam - Elected in a by-election held in 2024
- Councillor Sarah Green - Elected in an election held in October 2024
- Councillor Ellen Lorentz - Elected in an election held in October 2024.

== Key Oh Lodge ==
In 2016 the band started construction on a 42 bedroom lodge located in Burns Lake. The lodge will feature a business center, breakfast café as well as a two-story lobby. As of August 2016 construction was still underway. On January 15, 2017, the band announced the completion of Key-Oh Lodge on their Facebook page. "Come on down Saturday to our open house and check it out!"
