= Nee-Tahi-Buhn Band =

Nee-Tahi-Buhn
- Band No. 726
- Nee-Tahi-Buhn
- Nee-Tahi-Buhn First Nation within traditional Wetʼsuwetʼen territory
- People: Wetʼsuwetʼen
- Headquarters: 47805 Olson Road, Burns Lake, British Columbia
- Province: British Columbia

Land
- Main reserve: Uncha Lake 13A
- Reserves: Eastern Island 13; Francois Lake 7; Isaac (Gale Lake) 8; Omineca 1
- Land area: 3.293 km^{2} (1.271 sq mi)

Population (2020)
- On reserve: 39
- On other land: 16
- Off reserve: 97
- Total population: 152

Government
- Chief: Marcella Morris
- Council: Pat Mortensen, Bertie Hopkins

The Nee-Tahi-Buhn Band is a First Nation located in the Interior of British Columbia near Burns Lake.

== Governance ==
Nee-Tahi-Buhn is a section 11 First Nations band that uses a custom electoral system. The current council was appointed on December 12, 2018, with the exception of Councillor Tyson Lee Prince, who was appointed on October 18, 2019. The current council's term will expire on December 11, 2022.

== Demographics ==
Reserve number: 726
Number of Band Members: 133

== List of Reserves ==
- Eastern Island 13
- Francois Lake 7
- Isaac (Gale Lake) 8
- Omineca 1
- Uncha Lake 13A
