= Skin Tyee First Nation =

Skin Tyee
- Band No. 729
- Skin Tyee First Nation within traditional Wetʼsuwetʼen territory
- People: Wetʼsuwetʼen
- Province: British Columbia

Land
- Main reserve: Skins Lake 16B
- Reserves: Skins Lake 15; Skins Lake 16A; Tatla't East 2; Uncha Lake 13A; Western Island 14
- Land area: 3.966 km^{2} (1.531 sq mi)

Population (2020)
- On reserve: 54
- On other land: 5
- Off reserve: 130
- Total population: 189

Website
- https://www.skintyeefirstnation.org/

The Skin Tyee First Nation, also known as the Skin Tyee Indian Band, is a First Nations band government located in the Central Interior of British Columbia near François Lake, in the Omineca Country to the west of the City of Prince George.

== Demographics ==
Number of Band Members: 184

== Governance ==
Skin Tyee is a section 11 band that follows a custom electoral system.

The current elected Councillors are Gabriel Tom, and Shirley Wilson.

The Chief Councillor position is currently vacant pending a by-election.

== Indian Reserves ==
Indian Reserves under the administration of the Skin Tyee First Nation are:

- Skins Lake Indian Reserve No. 15, north of Skins Lake, at the head of the Cheslatta River, 183.70 ha.
- Skins Lake Indian Reserve No. 16A, 3/4 mile southeast of Octopus Lake, which is 2 miles south of Francois Lake, 64.7 ha.
- Skins Lake Indian Reserve No. 16B, on northwest shore of Uncha Lake, 64.7 ha.
- Tatla't East Indian Reserve No. 2, 56.10 ha.
- Uncha Lake Indian Reserve No. 13A, north shore of Uncha Lake, near wet end, 24.10 ha.
- Western Island Indian Reserve No. 4, a small island at the west end of Uncha Lake, 3.3 ha.
