= Shiladitya Bora =

Indian film producer and distributor

- Born: Assam
- Occupations: Director, producer, distributor
- Years active: 2015–present
- Spouse: Shilpi Agarwal
- Website: www.platoon.one

Shiladitya Bora is an Indian film producer, director, marketer and distributor. He is the founder of Platoon One Films, a Mumbai-based film production studio. Bora was born and brought up in Assam and completed his undergraduate and post-graduate studies in Ahmedabad. He started his film career by spearheading the indie release banner PVR Pictures' Directors' Rare, a limited release arm of India's biggest film exhibitor, PVR Cinemas group. Under this banner, he successfully released more than 85 independent films. In 2015, Bora was recognised for his work in marketing and distribution and was selected as one of the Berlinale Talents of the year. As the first CEO of Drishyam Films, Bora served as an Associate Producer on critically acclaimed films like Masaan (2015) and Newton (2017). He helped develop Newton from a one-line pitch to a story and greenlit the film to production. Newton went on to be selected as India's official entry for the 90th Academy Awards. In 2017, Bora founded Platoon One Films, a Mumbai based production studio with his wife and costume designer Shilpi Agarwal. Platoon One Films' maiden Hindi production Yours Truly, directed by Sanjoy Nag, starring Soni Razdan, Pankaj Tripathi and Aahana Kumra, premiered at the Busan International Film Festival 2018 and travelled to many festivals worldwide. Platoon One Films then went on to produce the National Award-Winning Marathi film Picasso, directed by Abhijeet Warang and starring Prasad Oak. He is also the producer for 2023 Indian Marathi-language thriller drama, Ghaath (2023 film) which was nominated to compete for the Panorama Audience Award and GWFF Best First Feature Award at the 73rd Berlin International Film Festival. His production Bayaan, directed by Bikas Ranjan Mishra and starring Huma Qureshi, will have its World Premiere at the Toronto International Film Festival 2025.

== Early life and education ==
Bora did his schooling in Assam and then his Bachelor's in Engineering from Lalbhai Dalpatbhai College of Engineering, Ahmedabad in 2005. He enrolled into Mudra Institute of Communications, Ahmedabad (MICA) for the Post Graduate program in Communication Management and Entrepreneurship. During his studies, he started FulMarxx Shorts Fest in 2008 which was rebranded in 2009 to a full-fledged film festival called Ahmedabad International Film Festival. Bora was awarded the MICA Award for Creative and Entrepreneurial Excellence in 2008 for this venture.

== Career ==
2010-2015

Bora started his film career by founding a film club called Sunset Boulevard. In tie-up with PVR Cinemas, who offered the venue, the film club conducted regular screenings for its members for a nominal fee. Impressed by the business model, PVR Cinemas decided to collaborate with Bora to replicate this format on a larger scale and conduct multi-city film festivals. In 2010 Bora, under the tutelage of Gautam Dutta, started PVR Cinemas' first indie release banner called PVR Directors' Rare. Under this banner, Shiladitya released around 85 films, which included fiction, documentary and experimental cinema from over the world.

2015-2017

In 2015, Bora became the first CEO of Drishyam Films, one of India's biggest independent film production companies. He served as an Associate Producer on critically acclaimed films such as Masaan, Waiting, Rukh and Newton. Each film garnered tremendous international acclaim and Newton went on to be selected as India's official entry into the Oscars in 2018. Bora also worked as the Executive Producer on the National Film Award winner Dhanak directed by Nagesh Kukunoor.

2017–Present

In 2017, Bora founded Platoon One Films, a Mumbai based film production studio, with costume designer and wife Shilpi Agarwal.

Platoon One Films has marketed and distributed over 60 films, both domestic and international since its inception. In 2020, Bora marketed and distributed the Cannes Film Award Winning Is love enough? Sir directed by Rohena Gera, starring Tillotama Shome and Vivek Gomber. The film also went on to win two Indian Filmfare Awards, for Best Actress and Best Screenplay in 2021.

Platoon One Films' maiden Hindi production Yours Truly was directed by the National Award-Winning director Sanjoy Nag. The film starring Soni Razdan, Pankaj Tripathi, Aahana Kumra and Mahesh Bhatt had its world premiere at the Busan International Film Festival 2018. In 2019, Bora directed his first short film Aapke Aa Jane Se starring Manu Rishi Chaddha. The short premiered at New York Indian Film Festival in 2019 and was screened at over 20 film festivals worldwide.

The second production undertaken by the banner was a Marathi language film called Picasso directed by Abhijeet Mohan Warang. The film stars the National Award-winning actor Prasad Oak and child artist Samay Tambe. In 2021, it won the National Film Award for Best Feature Film in Special mention.

Bora's Hindi feature directorial debut film Bhagwan Bharose starring Masumeh Makhija, Vinay Pathak, Shrikant Verma and Manu Rishi Chaddha was selected as the closing film for 25th UK Asian Film Festival, London. It won the Flame Award for Best Film at the festival.

Bora's latest production Bayaan directed by Bikas Ranjan Mishra and starring Huma Qureshi is set to have its World Premiere at the Toronto International Film Festival 2025 as part of the Discovery program.

== Filmography ==
Year	Title	Credited as	Notes
2015	Black Horse Memories	Executive Producer	
2015	Dhanak	Executive Producer	Won the Crystal Bear Grand Prix for Best Children's Film at the 65th Berlin International Film Festival.
2015	Masaan	Associate Producer	Won FIPRESCI Prize (Un Certain Regard) and Prix de l'Avenir (Un Certain Regard) at Cannes Film Festival 2015
2015	Waiting	Associate Producer	
2017	The Song of Scorpions	Executive Producer	
2017	Rukh	Associate Producer	
2017	Newton	Associate Producer	65th - National Film Award - Best Feature Film (Hindi) 65th - National Film Award - Special Mention (Actor)
2018	Yours Truly	Producer	
2019	Aapke Aa Jane Se	Director, producer	Short Film. 'Aapke Aa Jane Se' had its world premiere at the New York Indian Film Festival 2019 and was subsequently screened at over 17 film festivals worldwide. Some notable ones are: Cindependent Film Festival 2019 USA; Chicago South Asian Film Festival 2019; New Generations-Independent Indian Film Festival 2019
2021	Picasso	Producer	67th –National Film Award – Special Mention (feature film)
2022	Aye Zindagi	Producer	
2023	Bhagwan Bharose	Director, producer	Flame Award for Best Film at 25th UK Asian Film Festival, London
2023	Minimum	Producer	World Premiere at 26th UK Asian Film Festival, London
2023	Ghaath	Producer	World Premiere - Berlin International Film Festival 2023
2026	Toh Ti Ani Fuji	Producer	World Premiere at the Pune International Film Festival
2025	Bayaan	Producer	World Premiere at the 2025 Toronto International Film Festival
2026	Bindusagar	Producer	World Premiere at the 56th International Film Festival of India
