= Ali Haji (actor) =

Indian actor and director

- Born: 30 October 1999 (age 26); Mumbai, Maharashtra, India
- Occupations: Actor, writer, director
- Years active: 2000 – present
- Office: Founder of Pastiche Pictures
- Parents: Murtuza Haji; Fazilat Haji
- Awards: Best Child Actor for Noblemen at the New York Indian Film Festival

Master Ali Haji (born 30 October 1999) is an Indian actor and writer who rose to fame in Yoodlee films's Noblemen (2018) directed by Vandana Kataria. He portrayed a character named Shay Sharma, a struggling adolescent who goes through a life of loss and innocence at his new school. He won the Best Child Actor at the New York Indian Film Festival because of his performance in the movie Noblemen.

Before his breakthrough, he assumed smaller roles in several films. In Fanaa, he portrayed Rehan Qadri Jr. who was Aamir Khan and Kajol's son. He was Ranveer Singh "Champ" in the 2007 film Ta Ra Rum Pum, where he also played as Saif Ali Khan and Rani Mukerji's son.

He also had subsequent supporting roles in Partner (2007), Drona (2008), Right Yaaa Wrong (2010), Paathshaala (2010), and Super 30 (2019). He also portrayed Suraj Sinha in Line of Descent alongside Brendan Fraser.

== Career ==
Ali has been a part of over 100 TV commercials and his first film was Family as Amitabh Bachchan's grandson but was uncredited. He has also been a crucial part of the Bollywood feature titled Line of Descent previously known as The Field with Brendan Fraser, Ronit Roy, Neeraj Kabi, and Ali Haji as brothers trying to take over their father's, Prem Chopra business with Haji playing Suraj Sinha, the youngest of the brothers.

Ali starred in his first main role in the film Noblemen for which he won ‘Best Child Actor’ award at the New York Indian Film Festival. The film, also featuring Kunal Kapoor was directed by Vandana Kataria and produced by Saregama and Yoodlee Films, in which the film deals with boarding school and bullying issues. In 2019, he had a supporting role in the film, Super 30 starring Hrithik Roshan. Finally, in 2020, amidst the pandemic, Ali Haji rose like a true underdog as he wrote and filmed his first feature film titled Justice For Good Content .The story is a satire on the Indian film industry's long standing insider-outsider debate with the protagonist named Good Content. It maps the journey of a young filmmaker through the rigamarole of various processes, like producers, casting directors and talent agents to mount a film. The film, by design, has an ensemble cast filled with stellar names from the supporting actor prototype such as Suresh Menon, Anu Menon, Vijay Patkar, Rajkumar Kanojia, Max Fernandes, Jaimini Pathak, Delnaaz Irani, Raj Zutshi, Pradeep Kabra, Kritika Avasthi, Dilnaz Irani, Krishna Bisht, Rati Shankar Tripathi, Rajendra Chawla, Prabhjyot Singh, Vanita Kharat and many many more.

Ali additionally owns a theatre production studio known as Clean Slate Studios, under which he has written and directed two plays, Kaaya and in July 2016, a satire on the Indian parenting system, The Mad World of Rustom Irani.

== Filmography ==
=== Films ===
Year	Title	Role	Notes
2006	Family - Ties of Blood	Viren's grandson	Uncredited
2006	Fanaa	Rehan Qadri Jr.	
2007	Partner	Rohan Sahani	
2007	Ta Ra Rum Pum	Ranveer Singh "Champ"	
2008	Drona	Young Drona	
2008	My Friend Ganesha 2	Vashu Mehta	
2010	Paathshaala	Rohan Ahuja	
2010	Right Yaaa Wrong	Yash A. Sridhar	
2019	Noblemen	Shay	Won 'Best Child Actor at the New York Indian Film Festival.
2019	Line of Descent	Suraj Sinha	
2019	Super 30	Prithvi	
