= Padmashree Laloo Prasad Yadav =

- Movie poster
- Directed by: Mahesh Manjrekar
- Screenplay by: Yash; Vinay
- Produced by: Manik Bedi; Sagoon Wagh
- Starring: Sunil Shetty; Mahesh Manjrekar; Johnny Lever; Masumeh
- Cinematography: Vijay Arora
- Edited by: V. N. Mayekar
- Music by: Anand Raj Anand; Sukhwinder Singh; Nitin Raikwar
- Release date: 28 January 2005
- Running time: 149 minutes
- Country: India
- Language: Hindi

Padmashree Laloo Prasad Yadav is a 2005 Indian Hindi-language comedy film directed by Mahesh Manjrekar. Starring Sunil Shetty, Mahesh Manjrekar, Masumeh, Johnny Lever, Sharat Saxena and Gulshan Grover in supporting roles. The title, which comprises the names of the four lead characters, is meant to be a pun on Lalu Prasad Yadav, an Indian politician, who also appeared in the film as himself in special appearance. A portion of the film was shot in South Africa. The film was loosely based on 1988 film by Charles Crichton A Fish Called Wanda.

== Synopsis ==
Laloo's girlfriend Padma is fed up with him regularly cheating on her. After one such incident, she takes a flight to Cape Town to recover some jewels, which are rightfully hers, since her father's partner wrongfully stole them. Padma lands in Cape Town to discover him already there to receive her. After endless bouts of asking for her forgiveness Laloo is finally pardoned for the nth time. Laloo tries to help out Padma in her mission but ends up messing things up miserably. To get out of the mess Laloo obtains help from a local thug in Cape Town named Johnny, a club owner, and from his sidekick Yadav, who helps them rob the bank holding the jewels. The four rob the bank, recover the stolen jewels, and split up outside the bank. While escaping from the bank, Yadav nearly runs over an old lady with three dogs who becomes a witness to the robbery.

Now that the jewels are out from the bank, Padma has no qualms about ditching the other three. A game of double crossing begins. Padma calls the police and informs them of Johnny having robbed the bank, after which the police arrest Johnny — but Johnny has already moved the jewels.

Padma turns her charms on Prasad, the lawyer who is fighting for Johnny. She entices Prasad to extract the information as to where the jewels have been hidden by Johnny. Laloo becomes jealous of Prasad and wants to teach him a lesson, but has not reckoned on Yadav, who has also fallen victim to Padma's charms.

== Cast ==
- Sunil Shetty as Lalchand Dilachand (Laloo)
- Masumeh as Padmashree Divakar Kashyap
- Mahesh Manjrekar as Advocate Prasad Pritam Pradyuma
- Johnny Lever as Yadav
- Gulshan Grover as Johnny
- Sharat Saxena as Uncle Tom (Laloo's uncle)
- Kim Sharma as Rita
- Anupama Verma as Mrs. Pradyuma
- Navdeep Singh as Seth
- Kalpana Pandit
- Vikash Verma as Don
- Puneeth Rajkumar
- Supriya Karnik as Maya Tom's wife
- Lalu Prasad Yadav as himself (special appearance)

== Music ==
Music was done by 3 music directors, Anand Raj Anand, Sukhwinder Singh and Nitin Rai

1. "Aaoonga Nahn Peeche Peeche" - Abhijeet, Vaishali Samant - Music: Anand Raj Anand
2. "Chidiya Chidiya" - Vaishali Samant, Mahesh Manjrekar - Music: Anand Raj Anand
3. "Chidiya Chidiya" (Fadooo Mix) - Mahesh Manjrekar, Vaishali Samant - Music: Anand Raj Anand
4. "Deewana" - Music and Singer: Sukhwinder Singh
5. "Jadoo" (Female) - Sunidhi Chauhan - Music: Sukhwinder Singh
6. "Jadoo" (Male) - Music and Singer: Sukhwinder Singh
7. "Kabhi To Rooth Ja" - Shaan - Music: Nitin Raikar
8. "Padmashree Laloo Prasad Yadav" Vinod Rathod, K. K. - Music: Nitin Raikwar

== Reception ==
Ronjita Kulkarni of Rediff.com's called the film, "an insult to cinema".
