= Bayaan (film) =

2025 film Indian film by Bikas Ranjan Mishra

- Festival release poster
- Directed by: Bikas Ranjan Mishra
- Written by: Bikas Ranjan Mishra
- Produced by: Shiladitya Bora; Madhu Sharma; Kunal Kumar; Anuj Gupta
- Starring: Huma Qureshi; Chandrachur Singh; Sachin Khedekar
- Cinematography: Udit Khurana
- Edited by: A. Sreekar Prasad
- Music by: Ajay Jayanthi
- Production companies: Platoon One Films; Summit Studios; Guidant Films
- Release date: 6 September 2025 (TIFF)
- Running time: 118 minutes
- Country: India
- Language: Hindi

Bayaan is a 2025 Hindi police procedural, drama film written and directed by Bikas Ranjan Mishra. Starring Huma Qureshi, the film centers on Roohi, a female detective investigating her first case of a prominent cult leader, facing anonymous accusations of sexual abuse, confronts institutional power and reluctant witnesses.

The film is selected in the Discovery section of the 2025 Toronto International Film Festival and had its World premiere on 6 September 2025.

== Synopsis ==
The film is set in a remote town in Rajasthan, where devotion runs deep and silence is must. The story begins when an anonymous letter accuses a revered cult leader of sexual abuse and officer Roohi, a young detective from Delhi is assigned to investigate allegations. As she delves into the case, she confronts the complex power dynamics within the community. Her commitment to justice is tested by the harsh and deep rooted power structures within the town.

== Cast ==
- Huma Qureshi as Roohi Kartar
- Chandrachur Singh as Cult leader
- Sachin Khedekar
- Avijit Dutt
- Sampa Mandal
- Preeti Shukla
- Aditi Kanchan Singh
- Paritosh Sand
- Vibhore Mayank
- Swati Das
- Perry Chhabra

== Production ==
The film was produced by Shiladitya Bora of Platoon One Films and co-produced by Madhu Sharma of Summit Studios and Switzerland-based Sadik Keshwani of Guidant Films. The cinematography of the film was handled by Udit Khurana with editing by A. Sreekar Prasad and music composed by Ajay Jayanthi.

The film received backing from the International Film Festival Rotterdam’s Hubert Bals Fund and was developed through Film Independent's Global Media Makers LA Residency. During the program, Mishra worked on the screenplay under the mentorship of Craig Mazin, an American writer, director, and producer and, consulted with Jeff Stockwell, a writer; and Ruth Atkinson a Los Angeles-based, script consultant and story editor.

Principal photography began in Rajasthan in July 2024, and filming was wrapped up on 12 September 2024.

On 22 September 2024, the in-production film was presented at the Asian Project Market (APM), a pre-market, which is held in Busan, South Korea, in conjunction with the Busan International Film Festival.

== Release ==
Bayaan had its world premiere at the 2025 Toronto International Film Festival on 6 September 2025 in Discovery section. It was also showcased in the 'A Window on Asian Cinema' section of the 30th Busan International Film Festival on 18 September 2025.

== Awards ==
The film won the award for Best Feature Film at the 2026 Sundar Prize Film Festival.
