= Noblemen (film) =

Film directed by Vandana Kataria

- Theatrical release poster
- Directed by: Vandana Kataria
- Written by: Sonia Bahl; Sunil Drego; Vandana Kataria
- Produced by: Vikram Mehra; Siddharth Anand Kumar
- Starring: Kunal Kapoor; Ali Haji; Mohammed Ali Mir; Ivan Rodrigues; Hardik Thakkar; Muskaan Jaferi; Shaan Grover; Hardik Thakkar; Soni Razdan; Abhay Narang; Ankit kukreti Manav Chauhan; Parag Gupta; Aryaman Mihir Seth
- Cinematography: Ramanuj Dutta
- Edited by: Simranjeet Malhotra
- Music by: Srikanth Sriram; KC Loy
- Production companies: Yoodle Films; Saregama
- Release dates: May 2018 (NYIFF); 28 June 2019
- Running time: 121 minutes
- Country: India
- Language: English

Noblemen is an Indian English language drama film directed by Vandana Kataria. The film stars Kunal Kapoor, Ali Haji, Ivan Rodrigues, Mohommad Ali Mir, Ankit Kukreti, Muskkaan Jaferi, Shaan Groverr, Soni Razdan, Manav Chauhan, Parag Gupta and Abhay Narang in major roles. The story is about a 15-year-old boy, struggling with his adolescent years, who is terrorized by a gang of bullies in a posh boarding school. This sets forth a chain of events that leads to a loss of life and innocence. The film is backed by Yoodlee Films, a production venture of Saregama. The film is a thematic representation of The Merchant of Venice. The official teaser of the film was launched on 25 May 2018 and the film's Asian Premiere followed closely on 26 May at Kashish.

Noblemen premiered at the New York Indian Film Festival in 2018 and Ali Haji won the ‘Best Child Actor’ award. It was released theatrically in India on 28 June 2019.

== Plot ==
It is winter in a prestigious all boys’ boarding school, where children continue to practice age-old rituals and codes bound by years of hierarchy of the popular norm. Shay is picked on constantly, the main perpetrators being Arjun, the tall athletic sports captain and his best friend Baadal. Shay and Pia, the spunky daughter of the new Junior School history teacher, are cast as Bassanio and Portia in the Founders Day production of Merchant of Venice. But Baadal, the son of a movie star, wants Pia and thus the role opposite her. Murali, the charismatic drama teacher unknowingly adds salt to Baadal’s wounds by casting him as Shay’s understudy. Indignant, Baadal vows to get Shay’s part at any cost and turns to his buddy Arjun, the school Sports Captain, to help him secure the role by ousting Shay. It is a battle of wit against brawn, endurance against torture, courage against disgrace. The bullies brutally victimize Shay hoping to break him so he willingly relents his role. But Shay needs this role and will not budge, no matter what they do. Events take a sinister turn when Murali notices Shay's condition and intervenes to help him out. Now the whole school scorns him for being a rat. Humiliated beyond repair, Shay starts resenting Murali and begins to harbour a desire for revenge. This is the first step to his own undoing.

== Cast ==
- Ali Haji as Shay Sharma
- Kunal Kapoor as Murali
- Muskaan Jaferi as Pia
- Ivan Rodrigues as Deputy Headmaster
- Hardik Thakkar as Ganesh
- Mohommad Ali Mir as Arjun
- Shaan Grover as Baadal
- Soni Razdan as Shruti Sharma
- M. K. Raina as Headmaster
- Abhay Narang as Abhishek
- Manav Chauhan as Manav
- Parag Gupta as Parag
- Ankit kukreti as Ankit
- Aryaman Mihir Seth as House Captain

== Marketing and release ==
The official teaser was released on 24 May 2018. The official trailer of the film was released on 17 June 2019 by Yoodlee Films.

The film was released theatrically in India on 28 June 2019.

== Reception ==
=== Critical response ===
Siddhant Adlakha covering The New York Indian Film Festival, writing for /Film felt the premise could have made for a feel-good story in some other universe, and opined that the film expresses horrors within noble institutions that present themselves as culturally superior. He also submitted that in the guise of classy uniforms and pretension of culture superiority, men are turned into monsters, saying "Noblemen, while largely withheld to a point of minimalism, bursts sporadically with an unsettling energy as it explores the circumstances in which monsters create more monsters." Roger Walker-Dack concurred with Adlakha, and said, "The Noblemen brings home the point that in such an insidious regime where bullying still persists it is a breeding ground for even more homophobia." Sreeparna Sengupta of The Times of India gives the film three stars out of five, praising performance of Ali Haji, Muskaan Jaferi, Hardik Thakkar, Mohommad Ali Mir, Shaan, Kunal Kapoor and Soni Razdan, she says, "Winter and the backdrop of mountains, makes for the perfect setting in Noblemen as an unpredictable twist and the end of innocence makes its way here." She opines that Noblemen deals with school bullying and presents a graphic picture of its brutality and psychological impact it leaves on the mind of victim. She feels that the film lags pace here and there but it brings to fore some important issues. Amman Khurana of Times Now rated it three stars out of five, said, "Noblemen, engaging for the most part, is not your regular masala entertainer. [So] prepare yourself for an in-your-face cinematic experience." He felt that performances of ensemble were 'top-notch'. Agreeing with Sengupta he opined that the 'merciless winter' was a perfect setting for the film, that presented bullying, homophobia and toxic masculinity.

== Music and song ==
The music of film was composed by Shri Sriram and KC Loy. The lyrics are also by KC Loy. The song has been sung by Suraj Jagan. Rights are owned by Saregama.

Song listing
No.	Title	Singer(s)	Length
1.	"Yeh Duniya Agar"	Suraj Jagan	4:08

== Accolades ==
Noblemen premiered at the New York Indian Film Festival and Ali Haji won the ‘Best Child Actor’ award.
