= Soni Razdan =

British actress (born 1956)

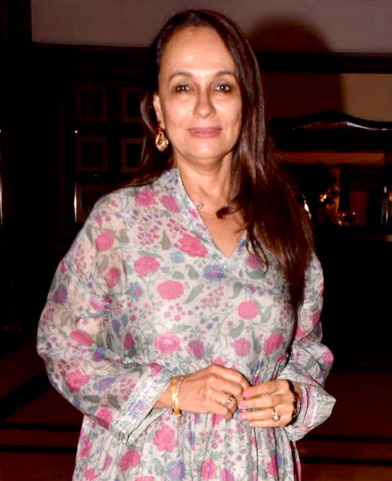
- Born: Soni Razdan; 25 October 1956 (age 70); Small Heath, England
- Occupations: Actress; film director
- Years active: 1981–present
- Spouse: Mahesh Bhatt
- Children: 2 including Alia Bhatt
- Family: Bhatt family

Soni Mahesh Bhatt, born and known professionally as Soni Razdan, is a British actress and film director who works in Hindi-language films. Known for her performances in performance-oriented films and supporting roles in big-budget films.

Part of the Bhatt family of Indian cinema, she is the wife of director Mahesh Bhatt and mother of actress Alia Bhatt. She made her acting debut as Rosemary in 36 Chowringhee Lane (1981). Her breakthrough came with drama film Saaransh (1984), earning a nomination for the Bengal Film Journalists' Association Award for Best Actress and Filmfare Award for Best Supporting Actress. Razdan's other notable works includes Mandi (1983), Trikal (1985), Khamosh (1985), Such a Long Journey (1998), Raazi (2018), and Yours Truly (2018). Razdan has also starred in many OTT series including, The Verdict - State vs Nanavati (2019), Out of Love (2019), This Way Up (2019), and Call My Agent: Bollywood (2021).

== Early life ==
Razdan was born on 25 October 1956 in the Small Heath area of Birmingham, England to a British mother of German descent, Gertrude Hoelzer and an Indian father of Kashmiri Pandit descent, Narendra Nath Razdan. She grew up in Mumbai, India.

== Career ==
Razdan debuted in Hindi films in a supporting role with the 1981 film 36 Chowringhee Lane starring Jennifer Kendal. It also marked the directorial debut of Aparna Sen, who had until then been known as a leading actress of Bengali cinema. Razdan garnered mainstream attention for her appearance in the film. 36 Chowringhee Lane was also entered in the first edition of the Manila International Film Festival, where it won the top prize. Scholar Wimal Dissanayake sees the film as a portrayal of the patriarchal social system: "The film portrays the plight of a lonely woman in a society that cares little for questions of female subjectivity and self-fulfillment. In popular culture the title of the film has become symbolic of the city of Kolkata, particularly its cuisine. A Bangalore restaurant is called 36 Chowringhee Lane. A fast-food chain in Delhi is called 34 Chowringhee Lane. Then she also appeared in Ahista Ahista directed by Esmayeel Shroff. It is a remake of the Kannada film Gejje Pooje.

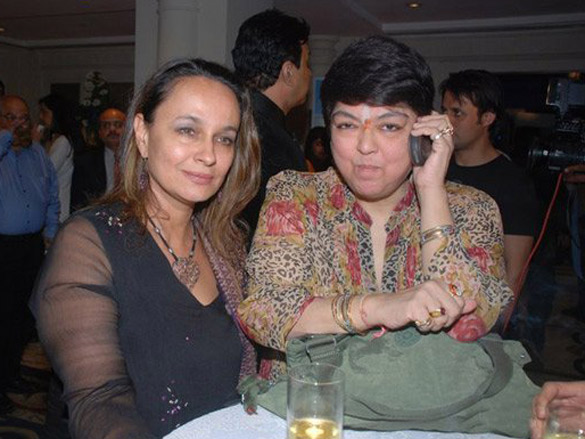
Razdan with Kalpana Lajmi at PETA Anniversary

In 1983, she appeared in film called Mandi directed by Shyam Benegal. Based on a classic Urdu short story Aanandi by writer Ghulam Abbas, the film narrates the story of a brothel, situated in the heart of a city, an area that some politicians want for its prime locality. The film is a satirical comedy on politics and prostitution. Her major breakthrough came in 1984 film Saaransh. It is about an elderly Maharashtrian couple living in Mumbai who come to terms with the loss of their only son. It was directed by her now husband Mahesh Bhatt. It was also chosen as India's official entry for the 1985 Academy Award for Best Foreign Language Film but it was not nominated. Her performance in the film was critically appreciated by the audience for which she earned a nomination for the Bengal Film Journalists' Association Award for Best Actress and Filmfare Award for Best Supporting Actress. In 1985, Razdan had two release in the year which was the Historical drama Trikal (alongside Leela Naidu, Naseeruddin Shah and Neena Gupta) and the Thriller Khamosh (alongside Shabana Azmi and again with Naseeruddin Shah), both of which were critically and commercially successful. In 1986, Razdan starred in an English-language Indian film named On Wings of Fire. From 1990-1993, Razdan appeared in 6 films. Including — Daddy, Sadak, Saathi, Sir, Gumrah, and Gunaah. Mostly she appeared as a supporting roles.

In 1998, Razdan appeared as a lead in the Canadian film named Such a Long Journey, co-starring Roshan Seth and directed by Sturla Gunnarsson. The story, based on the novel of the same name written by Rohinton Mistry. The film was screened at the Toronto International Film Festival. In 2001, she appeared in the comedy film, Monsoon Wedding. Monsoon Wedding premiered in the Marché du Film section of the 2001 Cannes Film Festival and went on to win the Golden Lion at the Venice International Film Festival and receive a Golden Globe Award nomination while grossing over $30 million internationally at the box office. A musical based on the film premiered on Broadway in April 2014. In 2017, IndieWire named it the 19th best romance of the 21st century. Between 2004-2013, she appeared in many films including, Dobara, Page 3, Jaan-E-Mann, Dil Dosti Etc, Patiala House,

Razdan directed a film called Love Affair that was expected to be released in 2016, but did not. She acted in Meghna Gulzar's Raazi which also starred her daughter Alia in the lead role. This was the first time when she shared the screen with Alia where she played the character of Alia's mother. Soni played the lead role in the film Yours Truly where she portrayed the character of a lonely middle-aged government employee Mithi Kumar. Reviewer from The Quint writes, Sanjoy Nag uses silence as a tool to help us understand Mithi better, and Razdan embraces that silence. She is brave yet afraid, stoic yet vulnerable, lonely yet hopeful. In 2019, she appeared in Noblemen, No Fathers in Kashmir and War.

== Personal life ==
Razdan is married to filmmaker Mahesh Bhatt since 1986. She is the mother of author Shaheen Bhatt and film actress Alia Bhatt, and the step mother of actors Pooja Bhatt and Rahul Bhatt from Bhatt's previous marriage to Lorraine Bright.

Razdan has stated that she has lived in India since she was a 3 month old and that she carries an Overseas Citizenship of India.

== Filmography ==
=== Films ===
Year	Film	Role	Notes
1981	36 Chowringhee Lane	Rosemary Stoneham	
1981	Ahista Ahista	Deepa	
1982	Meri Kahani	Muni	
1983	Mandi	Nadira	
1984	Saaransh	Sujata Suman	Nominated – Filmfare Award for Best Supporting Actress
1984	Party	Malvika	
1984	Sheeshay Ka Ghar	Reema	
1985	Trikaal	Aurora	
1985	Khamosh	Herself	
1986	On Wings of Fire	Thais	
1986	Aashiana	Sakshi	
1987	Kaash	Najma	
1988	Kaal Chakra	Sunidhi	
1988	Insaaf Ki Jung	Brinda	
1989	Wasta	Regma	
1990	Daddy	Priya	
1991	Sadak	Roopa	Special appearance
1991	Saathi	Tina	
1991	Swayam	Nandini	
1993	Sir	Shobha Verma	
1993	Gumrah	Angela	
1993	Gunaah	Gloria	
1994	Naaraaz	Sabrina/Samina	Double role
1994	Papa Kahte Hain	Swati Sinha	
1998	Such a Long Journey	Dilnavaz Noble	
2001	Monsoon Wedding	Saroj Rai	
2004	Dobara	Mrs. Devika Mehta	
2004	White Noise	Jamini	
2005	Page 3	Anjali Thapar	
2005	Nazar	—N/a	Director
2006	Jaan-E-Mann	Mrs. Goel	
2007	Dil Dosti Etc	Apurv's Mother	
2011	Patiala House	Dimple Bua	
2011	Love Breakups Zindagi	Gayatri's mother	
2013	Shootout at Wadala	Manya's mother	
2016	Love Affair	—N/a	Director; Unreleased
2018	Raazi	Teji Khan	
2018	Yours Truly	Mithi Kumar	
2019	Noblemen	Shruti Sharma	
2019	No Fathers in Kashmir	Halima	
2019	War	Nafeesa Rahmani	
2021	Sardar Ka Grandson	Simi	Netflix film
2023	Pippa	Maati	
2025	Aabeer Gulaal	Sushma	
2025	War 2	Nafeesa Rahmani	Cameo
2025	Om Ka Hari	Renuka	
2025	Songs of Paradise	Noor Begum	

=== Television ===
Year	Show	Role	Platform	Notes	Ref.
1986	Buniyaad	Sulochana (Lochan)	DD National		
1994-98	Junoon		DD Metro		
1995-96	Saahil		DD Metro		
2001	Hamare Tumhare	—N/a	Zee TV	Producer	
2017	Love Ka Hai Intezaar	Rajmata Rajeshwari Ranawat	Star Plus		
2019	The Verdict - State vs Nanavati	Mehra Nanavati	ALTBalaji and ZEE5		
2019	Out of Love	Mrs. Kapoor	Hotstar		
2019	This Way Up	Kavita, Vish's mother	Channel 4		
2021	Call My Agent: Bollywood	Treasa	Netflix		
2024	Tanaav	Zubeida Mir	SonyLIV season 2		
2026	Bait	Naila	Prime Video		
2026	Brown	Janice Brown	ZEE5		
2026	Shaque: Trust No One	Madhu Dutt	Netflix		

== Accolades ==
Year	Award	Category	Work	Result	Ref
1985	Filmfare Awards	Best Supporting Actress	Saaransh	Nominated	
1985	Bengal Film Journalists' Association Awards	Best Actress	Saaransh	Nominated	
2024	Indian Television Academy Awards	Best Supporting Actress - OTT	Pippa	Won	
