= Aakhri Sawal =

2026 Indian film by Abhijeet Mohan Warang

- Theatrical release poster
- Directed by: Abhijeet Mohan Warang
- Written by: Utkarsh Naithani
- Produced by: Nikhil Nanda; Sanjay Dutt
- Starring: Sanjay Dutt; Namashi Chakraborty; Amit Sadh; Sameera Reddy
- Cinematography: Stanley Mudda
- Edited by: Sanjay Sankla
- Music by: Monty Sharma
- Production companies: Nikhil Nanda Motion Pictures; Neem Tree Entertainment
- Distributed by: PVR Inox Pictures
- Release date: 15 May 2026
- Running time: 117 minutes
- Country: India
- Language: Hindi
- Budget: ₹33 crore
- Box office: ₹3.02 crore

Aakhri Sawal (transl. The Final Question) is a 2026 Indian Hindi-language political drama film directed by Abhijeet Mohan Warang and written by Utkarsh Naithani. It is produced by Nikhil Nanda and Sanjay Dutt. The film stars Sanjay Dutt, Namashi Chakraborty, Amit Sadh, and Sameera Reddy.

The film was released theatrically on 15 May 2026.

== Plot ==
Vicky Hegde, a young scholar, publicly challenges his former mentor, Professor Gopal Nadkarni, over ideological and historical questions, sparking a nationwide debate. As their conflict intensifies, Vicky uncovers links to the mysterious disappearance of researcher Pallavi Menon.

With the help of investigator Aditya Rao, Vicky discovers that the controversy is connected to secrets from Gopal's past. The search for truth leads to a final confrontation in which long-hidden actions and motivations are revealed, forcing those involved to confront the consequences of their choices.

== Cast ==
- Sanjay Dutt as Prof. Gopal Nadkarni
- Namashi Chakraborty as Vicky Hegde
- Amit Sadh as Aditya Rao
- Sameera Reddy as Prof. Pallavi Menon
- Nitu Chandra as Kavya Rawat
- Tridha Choudhury as Saara
- Mrinal Kulkarni as Prabha Nadkarni
- Harsimran Oberoi as Ipshita Das
- Rockey Raina as Sohraab
- Archana Iyer as Vicky's Mother
- Bipin Nadkarni as Bipin Chaudhary
- Nikhil Nanda as M.S. Golwalkar

== Music ==
The film's music is composed by Monty Sharma, with lyrics written by Kumar Vishwas.

== Release ==
=== Theatrical ===
Aakhri Sawal was released theatrically on 15 May 2026.

=== Home media ===
The film began streaming on Lionsgate Play from 14 August 2026.

== Reception ==
Anurag Singh Bohra of India Today gave 2 stars out of 5 and writes that the film "offers enough substance to warrant a viewing, even if its dramatic choices prevent it from reaching its full potential." Vinamra Mathur of Firstpost rated it 3/5 stars and observe that the film "doesn't give clear answers. The film asks questions and the answers are up to us."

Rishabh Suri of Hindustan Times gave 2 stars out of 5 and said that "The film feels less like a thought-provoking debate and more like a film caught between provocation and preachiness." Abhishek Srivastava of The Times of India rated it 3.5/5 stars and writes that the film "feels less like a film built to please everyone and more like a film built to provoke discussion."
