= Memories in March =

- Film poster
- Directed by: Sanjoy Nag
- Produced by: Shrikant Mohta; Mahendra Soni
- Starring: Deepti Naval; Rituparno Ghosh; Raima Sen
- Cinematography: Soumik Haldar
- Production company: Shree Venkatesh Films
- Release dates: 10 September 2010 (Pusan International Film Festival); 1 April 2011 (India)
- Running time: 103 minutes
- Country: India
- Languages: English; Hindi

Memories in March is a 2010 Indian drama film directed by Sanjoy Nag. The film stars Deepti Naval, Rituparno Ghosh, and Raima Sen. The film is an effective exploration of a situation wherein a bereaved mother comes to terms with her late son's sexual identity. The film was released on 1 Apr 2011.

== Plot ==
Delhi-based Arati Mishra believed her worst day was when she was divorced from her U.S.-based husband, Suresh, until she got the news that her Kolkata-based son, Siddhartha, had been killed in a traffic accident. She travels to Kolkata; is received at the airport by her son's co-worker, Sahana Choudhury, and accompanies her to the crematorium. After the cremation, she is then taken to the guesthouse where her son used to live and told that Siddhartha had been at a party, had not only consumed considerable alcohol but had also insisted on driving, and met with a fatal accident. The next day, she accompanies Sahana to her son's place of employment, where she meets some of the staff and signs some documents, but ends up distressed when she is not permitted to take her son's belongings. Quite upset, blaming the office workers for letting her son drive under the influence, she does not realize that she will be in for more shocks and surprises when she finds that her son has a secret life. Later, she accuses Ornub of seducing her son into this but realizes her son's love for him.

== Cast ==
- Deepti Naval as Arati Mishra
- Rituparno Ghosh as Ornob Mitra
- Raima Sen as Sahana Choudhury
- Rajat Ganguly as Sahana's Father
- Suchita Roy Chaudhury as Sahana's Mother
- Anya Chowdhry as Woman At the Airport (billed as Ananya Chowdhury)
- Kunal Padhy as Man At the Airport (billed as Kunal Padhi)
- Pradip Roy as Ramratan
- Buddhadev Chakraborty as Karim
- Abeer Chakraborty as CEO, Ad Agency
- Ekavali Khanna as Secretary to CEO
- Niladri Chatterjee as New Trainee
- Manjit Mukherjee as Vikash
- Dhruv Mookerji as Siddhartha's Voice (billed as Dhruv Mukherjee)
- Mainak Bhaumik as (voice role)

== Awards ==
58th National Film Awards

- Best Feature Film in English
- Deepti Naval was Winner of Best Actress Award at the 2012 ImagineIndia Film Festival (in Spain),
