= Yours Truly (2018 film) =

- Poster of Yours Truly
- Directed by: Sanjoy Nag
- Screenplay by: Sanjoy Nag
- Produced by: Shiladitya Bora, Nikhil Chaudhary, Milapsinh Jadeja
- Starring: Soni Razdan; Aahana Kumra; Pankaj Tripathi
- Cinematography: Stanley Mudda
- Edited by: Sankhajit Biswas
- Music by: Debajyoti Mishra; Rudraneel Chaudhary; Madhubanti Bagchi
- Release dates: 9 October 2018 (Busan); 3 May 2019
- Country: India
- Language: Hindi

Yours Truly is a 2018 Indian romantic drama film directed by Sanjoy Nag. The film stars Soni Razdan, Pankaj Tripathi and Aahana Kumra, with Mahesh Bhatt in a special appearance. It is an official adaptation of one of the stories (The One That Was Announced) from the book LOVE STORIES #1 TO 14 authored by Annie Zaidi and published by HarperCollins. The film is Shiladitya Bora's maiden production under Platoon One Films in association with MDC Filmworks, Lighthouse Innoventures and Basabaari Talkies. The film got acquired by Zee Entertainment Enterprises Limited (ZEEL) and had its world digital premiere on 3 May 2019 on ZEE5.

Yours Truly had its world premiere in the A Window on Asian Cinema section of the 23rd Busan International Film Festival (BIFF). The film had its India Premiere at the 24th Kolkata International Film Festival.

== Plot ==
Mithi Kumar is a 57-year- government employee who is getting close to retiring. She starts to feel an emotional bond with the voice of a railway station announcer. For years she thinks about the person and writes letters to share her feelings. As the day of her retirement gets closer she decides to try to find the man whose voice she has grown so attached, to.

== Cast ==
- Soni Razdan as Mithi Kumar
- Aahana Kumra as Lali Kumar
- Pankaj Tripathi as Vijay
- Tapati Munshi as Savitri
- Manali Chakravarty Aaina as Rina
- Kiriti Kanjilal as Dilip
- Vinay Pathak
- Mahesh Bhatt
- Muktadeep Saha as Train Passenger

== Production ==
The shooting for the film was completed in 33 days starting in October 2017 and wrapping up on 23 December, in and around Kolkata, West Bengal. Mahesh Bhatt made the announcement about the film through his official Twitter account on 23 December 2017.

The poster of the film was revealed on Twitter by Alia Bhatt.

== Songs and music ==
Track listing
No.	Title	Lyrics	Music	Singer(s)	Length
1.	"Tanha Tanha"	Amitabh Varma	Debojyoti Mishra	Madhubanti Bagchi	3:02

== Reception ==
Yours Truly has garnered multiple reviews and acclaim for its subtle portrayal of loneliness in the modern era.

In her review, Ishita Sengupta from The Indian Express states that, "Sanjoy Nag’s Yours Truly does not view loneliness as a condition contingent on something, rather as a continuous, pervasive state of being, and succeeds in presenting an intimate portrayal of loneliness and the lonely"; and in agreement with this view, Aayushi Sharma of ZeeTV compliments Nag's directorial prowess by writing, "Nag has sprinkled melancholy all over the film but kept the fragrance of it intact."

The protagonist of the film, Soni Razdan, caught the attention of writers and critics for her stellar performance as the 57 year old lonely Mithi Kumar.

Aayushi Sharma of ZeeTV writes that, "Soni Razdan’s spectacular performance makes us want to see more of her on the screen. She emotes more through frown lines and short smiles than words" and also that "Soni’s character is a beautiful reminder and a breakaway from the common notion that an elderly single woman tends to be bitter."

Together "Sanjoy Nag uses silence as a tool to help us understand Mithi better, and Soni Razdan embraces that silence. She is brave yet afraid, stoic yet vulnerable, lonely yet hopeful" writes Tanisha Bagchi from The Quint.

In praise of the actors and crew, Udita Jhunjhunwala from FirstPost writes, "Pankaj Tripathi and Aahana Kumra inject much needed energy and lightness into an otherwise sombre story" and Shoma A. Chatterjee from Upperstall writes, "Stanley Mudda’s cinematography plays around with the muted and underplayed colours of different locations as the narrative keeps moving in and out of spaces from Mithi’s home to the journey to the Howrah station with its announcements of local trains, to Mithi’s workplace."

Drawing comparisons between Soni's debut film 36 Chowringhee Lane, which was also about a lonely woman in Calcutta, Nandini Ramnath from Scroll.In writes, "The films part on the matters of poetry and the poetics of life in Kolkata. 36 Chowringhee Lane had a distinctive and consistent mood of melancholy running through it. Sanjoy Nag, who has also written Yours Truly, is more sanguine about Mithi’s prospects" while Subash K. Jha from GlamSham writes that, "Seen as a topi-tilt to "36 Chowringhee Lane", YOURS TRULY passes muster. But one gets the feeling that this portrait of an autumnal life was meant to be so much more than what it finally gets to be in this film".

Rahul Desai from Film Companion writes about the film saying, "When films are made about those who notice stories, or those who write to avoid being written about, it’s important that the makers resist the temptation of treating their protagonists as a device. Nag keeps Yours Truly honest to its vacuum, both physically and spiritually."
