= Saas Bahu Aur Sensex =

- Directed by: Shona Urvashi
- Written by: Shona Urvashi
- Produced by: Jayshri Makhija
- Starring: Tanushree Dutta; Ankur Khanna; Kirron Kher; Farooq Sheikh
- Cinematography: Diego Rodriguez
- Edited by: Adesh Verma
- Music by: Bipin and Blaze (direction); Raqueeb Alam; Blaze (lyrics)
- Production company: PLA Entertainment
- Distributed by: Warner Bros. Pictures
- Release date: 19 September 2008
- Country: India
- Language: Hindi
- Box office: 2.38 Crores

Saas Bahu aur Sensex is an Indian Hindi film which was released on 19 September 2008, directed by Shona Urvashi. It stars Kirron Kher, Tanushree Dutta, Ankur Khanna, Farooq Shaikh, Masumeh, Lillete Dubey, and Sharon Prabhakar. The film focuses on the complexities of discovering love in the world of the new Mumbai. The movie is set against the backdrop of the stress of working in financial markets, embarrassing kitty parties, outrageous soap operas, and the ongoing angst and excitement of an ever-emerging India. It is considered part of the Masala film genre, which depicts a mixture of action, comedy, romance, and drama/melodrama.

== Synopsis ==
When her mother suddenly divorces her father and leaves their comfortable home in Kolkata, Nitya finds herself in the new setting of Navi Mumbai. Her life is turned upside down. She must navigate life in a new city, start a new job at a call centre, and let go of her ambition to go to the United States to get an MBA. She soon meets and befriends the extremely nice Ritesh Jetmalani, who helps her cope with all this change.

Kirti Wagaskar, Ritesh's girlfriend, has plans to marry rich. She spends an entire month's salary on a Gucci bag and dreams of marrying Yash Modi, a billionaire by birth. She resents her elder sister Parimal's life as a housewife with her grouchy traditional husband, Ganpatrao.

Nitya's mother, Binita Sen, is troubled by her failed marriage. She hopes to find the new start she needs in New Mumbai. She is befriended by the women in the colony and joins their kitty party. She knows her daughter is angry with her and blames her for their situation, but believes that this was their best alternative. Binita's father had left her some shares. At her father's old stock brokerage house, she meets Firoz Sethna, an ethical, but cranky and eccentric, stock broker who teaches her the ropes of investing.

In the meantime, the group of kitty party ladies feels that Binita is up to something. They learn that she is trying to sell stocks, and they want to become amateur investors, switching from watching soap operas to watching CNBC to look for investing opportunities.

One day at work, Nitya overhears CEOs discussing plans to get their children married. She tells her mother, who advises her friends to invest in their companies because the stock prices are likely to go up with the marriage. With all the kitty ladies invested emotionally and financially in the company, Binita determines that having Ritesh marry Kirti is best for everyone. Nitya, despite her feelings for Ritesh, waits for the wedding day to arrive in silence. Binita sees her daughter's dilemma and finally tells her the real reason for her coming to New Mumbai. Her husband had left her for a younger woman, and she did not want her daughter to deal with the pressure or gossip, nor did she want to be dependent on him.

== Cast ==
- Tanushree Dutta - Nitya Sen
- Masumeh - Kirti Wagaskar
- Mukta Barve - Parimal
- Anoushka Anand - Sania
- Karthik Ramachandran - Karthik
- Sudhanshu Pandey - Yash Modi
- Karishma Chandna - Sweetu
- Parineeta Borthakur - "Tv star"
- Seema Azmi - Lata
- Divyatta Singh - Reena Jetmalani
- Ankur Khanna
- Kirron Kher - Vinita Sen
- Farooq Sheikh - Feroz Setna
- Lillete Dubey - Anita Jetmalani
- Yohan Jain - Little Boy in Onscreen T.V
- Shreya Sharma - Thea Pandol

== Box office ==
Saas Bahu Aur Sensex earned 2.38 crores gross and 1.25 crores net in its theatrical run.
