= Seema Azmi =

Indian film and theatre actress

Seema
- Born: Seema Azmi; Guwahati, Assam, India
- Occupation: Actress
- Years active: 2005–present

Seema Azmi (also known as "Seema") is an Indian film and theatre actress.

== Biography ==
Seema Azmi was born in Guwahati, Assam, India, with Azamgarh origin, and was brought up in Delhi where she completed her schooling and graduated from Delhi University. She joined the National School of Drama in Delhi.

Azmi joined Asmita theatre group, Delhi in 1996. Her plays include Girish Karnad's Rakt Kalyan (Taledanda), Mahesh Dattani's Final Solutions, Ek Mamooli Aadmi, Swadesh Deepak's Court Martial, and Dario Fo's Accidental Death of an Anarchist.

== Filmography ==
Year	Title	Director	Role
2005	Water	Deepa Mehta	Bahu- Rani
2007	Chak De! India	Shimit Amin	Rani Dispotta
2008	Saas Bahu Aur Sensex	Shona Urvashi	Lata K. Kodialbal
2011	The Best Exotic Marigold Hotel	John Madden	Anokhi
2011	Aarakshan	Prakash Jha	Shambhu Yadav's Wife
2014	Sound of Silence: The Collision of Storms Within (Short)	Vipin Paraashar	The Girl
2015	Chitrafit 3.0 Megapixel	Divakar Ghodake	Shavla
2015	The Second Best Exotic Marigold Hotel	John Madden	Anokhi
2018	Mohalla Assi	Dr. Chandraprakash Dwivedi	Ramdayi
2021	Fiza Mein Tapish	Rahat Khan	Rabia Zaidi
