= Bhagwan Bharose =

Ab Toh Sab Bhagwan Bharose
- Directed by: Shiladitya Bora
- Screenplay by: Sudhakar Nilmani 'Eklavya' and Mohit Chauhan
- Story by: Sudhakar Nilmani 'Eklavya'
- Starring: Satendra Soni; Sparsh Suman; Vinay Pathak; Masumeh Makhija; Manurishi Chaddha; Shrikant Verma
- Cinematography: Surjodeep Ghosh
- Edited by: Suraj Gunjal
- Music by: Indian Ocean (band)
- Production company: Platoon One Films
- Distributed by: PVR Inox Pictures
- Release date: 13 October 2023
- Running time: 95 minutes
- Country: India
- Language: Hindi

Bhagwan Bharose is an Indian 2023 Hindi language film directed by Shiladitya Bora. The film stars Satendra Soni, Sparsh Suman, Vinay Pathak, Masumeh Makhija, Shrikant Verma, Mahesh Sharma, Sawan Tank, and Manurishi Chaddha. It is produced by Prasanna Vithanage along with Platoon One Films, IVS Corporation, Lighthouse Innoventures & Sri Sathya Sai Arts. The film is based on a true story by Sudhakar Neelmani, with screenplay and dialogues by Sudhakar and Mohit Chauhan. It features original music by the Indian rock band Indian Ocean (band) with lyrics by Sanjeev Sharma. Bhagwan Bharose is selected as the Closing Film for the 25th UK Asian Film Festival, London.

== Synopsis ==
Bhagwan Bharose is about two young, impressionable kids whose ideas about faith are constantly questioned and changed as their little world expands and takes into its fold, their country's fast-changing socio-political landscape. The official tagline of the film highlights it as a story of lost childhood.

== Cast ==
- Satendra Soni as Bhola
- Sparsh Suman as Shambhu
- Masumeh Makhija as Radha
- Vinay Pathak as Nanababu
- Shrikant Verma as Panditji
- Mahesh Sharma as Mohan Mama
- Sawan Tank as Dwaraka
- Manurishi Chaddha

== Music ==
The music of the film is composed by Indian Ocean, a popular Indian rock band with lyrics by Sanjeev Sharma. Along with the songs, Indian Ocean has also created the background music for the film.

No.	Title	Lyrics	Music	Length
1.	"Chai Pakode"	Sanjeev Sharma	Indian Ocean (band)	3:36
2.	"Ek Jaan Se Duniya"	Sanjeev Sharma	Indian Ocean (band)	4:27

== Release ==
Canadian film company Rhythm Boyz acquired the overseas distribution rights for North America, Canada, U.K., Australia and New Zealand and released Bhagwan Bharose in these markets on 13 Oct. PVR Inox Pictures will release the film in India on the same day. The official theatrical poster of the film was unveiled by the Indian auteur Sriram Raghavan on 21 September 2023.

Bhagwan Bharose had its world premiere at the 25th UK Asian Film Festival held from 4–14 May 2023 in London, where it also won the Flame Award for Best Film. It was also selected as the closing film of the 9th Jaffna International Cinema Festival in Sri Lanka.

In January 2024, Bhagwan Bharose is scheduled to be featured at the renowned Honolulu Museum of Art's Doris Duke Theatre, situated in Hawaii and recognized as the state's largest independent arthouse theatre. Additionally, it will be first Indian film to be showcased at the Snowdance Independent Film Festival, Essen, Germany. Snowdance is ranked among the top 100 best-reviewed festivals globally.

It is the first independent film, in India, to get a commercial release in Leh Ladakh, at the world's highest mobile cinema hall which is perched at 11,562 feet.

== Reception ==
On the review aggregator website Rotten Tomatoes, 73% of 11 critics' reviews are positive, with an average rating of 6.9/10.

Bobby LePire of Film Threat gave the film a 10/10 movie score and wrote that, "The screenwriters and director have something they are passionate about and convey it with heart. The film is simply beautiful to behold."

Dhaval Roy of The Times of India gave it a 3.5 star and said that "The film is thought-provoking without being preachy. What truly stands out about the movie is the strong message it delivers without letting go of the compelling story and narrative."

Saumya Baijal from Outlook India writes in her article that, "Ab Toh Sab Bhagwan Bharose is a timely reminder of a past that has shaped the hate of the present...A film and script like this is deeply aware of its gaze. A third person viewing that is strikingly personal, set in the languid village that not once favors any narrative."

From Mint Lounge, Udita Jhunjhunwala writes in her review of Bhagwan Bharose, "Several ideas in this unhurried story...Director Shiladitya Bora's debut feature film extracts wonderful performances from its young cast"
