= Love Affair (unreleased film) =

- Directed by: Soni Razdan
- Starring: See below
- Production companies: T-Series; Fish Eye Network Pvt Ltd
- Distributed by: T-Series; Fish Eye Network Pvt Ltd
- Country: India
- Language: Hindi

Love Affair is an unreleased Indian Bollywood biographical film directed by Soni Razdan under the T-Series and Fish Eye Network Pvt Ltd banners. The principal photography of the film commenced in January 2016.

== Plot ==
The film is based on the 1959 Nanavati murder case. The film has not been released yet.

== Cast ==
- Ali Fazal as Kawas Manekshaw Nanavati
- Kalki Koechlin as Sylvia Nanavati
- Gulshan Devaiah as Prem Bhagwan Ahuja
- Chandan Roy Sanyal as Ram Jethmalani
- Karishma Kotak as Mamie Ahuja
- Hansika Motwani
- Soni Razdan
