= Ta Ra Rum Pum =

2007 film by Siddharth Anand

- Theatrical release poster
- Directed by: Siddharth Anand
- Written by: Habib Faisal
- Story by: Siddharth Anand
- Produced by: Aditya Chopra
- Starring: Saif Ali Khan; Rani Mukerji; Angelina Idnani; Ali Haji; Javed Jaffrey
- Narrated by: Angelina Idnani
- Cinematography: Binod Pradhan
- Edited by: Rameshwar S. Bhagat; Ritesh Soni
- Music by: Songs: Vishal–Shekhar; Score: Salim–Sulaiman
- Distributed by: Yash Raj Films
- Release date: 27 April 2007
- Running time: 153 minutes
- Country: India
- Language: Hindi
- Budget: ₹28 crore
- Box office: ₹72 crore

Ta Ra Rum Pum is a 2007 Indian Hindi-language sports drama film directed by Siddharth Anand and produced by Aditya Chopra under Yash Raj Films. The film stars Saif Ali Khan, Rani Mukerji, Angelina Idnani, Ali Haji, and Jaaved Jaaferi. Set in the United States, the narrative follows Rajveer Singh, a professional stock car racer whose career takes a downturn following an accident, and his journey of personal and professional redemption with the support of his wife Radhika and their two children.

Principal photography began in May 2006, with filming taking place across locations such as the Milwaukee Mile in Wisconsin, Rockingham Speedway in North Carolina, and on sets in Mumbai. The music was composed by Vishal–Shekhar, with lyrics written by Javed Akhtar.

Ta Ra Rum Pum was released theatrically on 27 April 2007 and received mixed reviews from critics who praised Khan and Mukerji's performances, as well as the film's production values and setting, but criticised the screenplay and pacing. The film emerged as a moderate commercial success, grossing ₹70 crore (US$8.3 million) worldwide, and ranked as the tenth highest-grossing Hindi film of the year.

== Plot ==
Rajveer "RV" Singh is a cheerful and ambitious race track pit crew member in New York City who dreams of becoming a professional car racer. His skills attract the attention of Hariprasad "Harry" Patel, a racing team manager, after RV illegally speeds a taxi owned by Harry's team, Speeding Saddles. Impressed, Harry offers RV a contract as a professional stock car racer.

RV quickly rises to prominence in the racing world and marries Radhika "Shona" Shekhar Rai Bannerjee, a pianist studying at Columbia University, despite her father's disapproval due to RV's lack of formal education. Radhika eventually gives up her career to raise their two children, Priya "Princess" and Ranveer "Champ," while RV continues his racing career.

Eight years later, RV is hospitalized following a crash during a race caused by rival racer Rusty Finkelstein. Although he recovers physically and returns to racing after a year, the psychological trauma resulting from the impact affects his performance, leading to him finishing last in every race. Eventually, the team owner, Billy Bhatia, replaces him with Rusty.

Unable to find stable employment, and after a failed attempt to form a new team, RV and his family face financial difficulties, resulting in the foreclosure of their home and the loss of most possessions. RV hides the truth from Princess and Champ by lying that they are on a reality TV show. With limited resources, they move into a modest apartment on the city's outskirts. To support their children's continued education, RV and Shona take on various odd jobs. Shona's father offers assistance, but she refuses after he insults RV.

RV briefly considers giving up their dog, Bruno, to reduce expenses, but ultimately keeps him after encouragement from Harry, who offers RV a taxi license, which he reluctantly accepts. After a heated argument between Shona and RV, Princess and Champ learn about their financial troubles. They secretly save their lunch money by eating from the school dustbin, while RV works as a taxi driver, and Shona plays in restaurants. RV encounters a passenger who asks for a speedy airport arrival; using it as a chance to test his racing skills, RV initially does well but falters after suffering flashbacks of his accident.

In an attempt to pay the school fees and expenses, RV lies to his cab driver friends that Princess has pneumonia, prompting them to start a pool of funds. When Shona finds out, she gets enraged. Champ collapses and is rushed to the hospital, where doctors discover a piece of glass in Champ's stomach, requiring expensive surgery, which RV and Shona cannot afford. RV seeks financial help from Billy, who refuses, but Harry steps in with an offer to reenter racing by forming an independent team. RV accepts, and his cab driver friends form the new pit crew.

RV returns to the track, facing lingering post-traumatic stress, particularly while competing against Rusty. Remembering his son's condition, he motivates himself to keep going and overcomes his fear. In the last lap, RV shoves Rusty in the same way Rusty did to RV, injuring Rusty in the process. RV wins the race, and Champ survives.

In the aftermath, RV resumes full-time racing, Shona restarts her music career, and the family returns to their former home. They occasionally visit their old neighborhood to remain connected to their past. The film ends with RV gifting Shona her original wedding ring.

== Cast ==
- Saif Ali Khan as Rajveer "RV" Singh
- Rani Mukerji as Radhika "Shona" Shekhar Rai Banerjee / Singh
- Angelina Idnani as Priya "Princess" Singh, Rajveer and Radhika's daughter
- Ali Haji as Ranveer "Champ" Singh, Rajveer and Radhika's son
- Javed Jaffrey as Hariprasad "Harry" Dhirubhai Patel, Rajveer's manager
- Victor Banerjee as Shubho Shekhar Rai Banerjee, Radhika's father
- Shruti Seth as Sasha, Radhika's best friend
- Bharat Dabholkar as Billy "Bill" Bhatia
- Sujoy Ghosh as Chatto
- Ronobir Leheri as Pindi
- Ravi Khote as Pandya
- Dolly Bindra as Mrs. Pandya
- Ken Thompson as Rusty Finkelstein
- Tirlok Malik as Restaurant owner

== Production ==
=== Development ===
Ta Ra Rum Pum marked Siddharth Anand’s second directorial venture following Salaam Namaste (2005). The film drew narrative inspiration from several American films, including Days of Thunder (1990), Talladega Nights: The Ballad of Ricky Bobby (2006), and The Pursuit of Happyness (2006), blending elements of motorsport drama with themes of family resilience and financial struggle.

Anand and screenwriter Habib Faisal aimed to create a family-oriented sports drama set against the backdrop of American stock car racing, with a focus on emotional themes and aspirational storytelling. The working title during pre-production was Ta Ra Rum Pum Pum.

=== Casting ===
The film marked the second collaboration between Saif Ali Khan and Rani Mukerji under Anand’s direction, following Salaam Namaste. Khan was cast as Rajveer "RV" Singh, a spirited race car driver, while Mukerji played Radhika "Shona" Shekar Rai Banerjee, a pianist and RV's eventual wife. The child roles of Priya “Princess” and Rajveer Jr. “Champ” were portrayed by Angelina Idnani and Ali Haji, respectively. According to reports, Haji was selected after three rounds of auditions, while Idnani was cast following four.

=== Filming ===
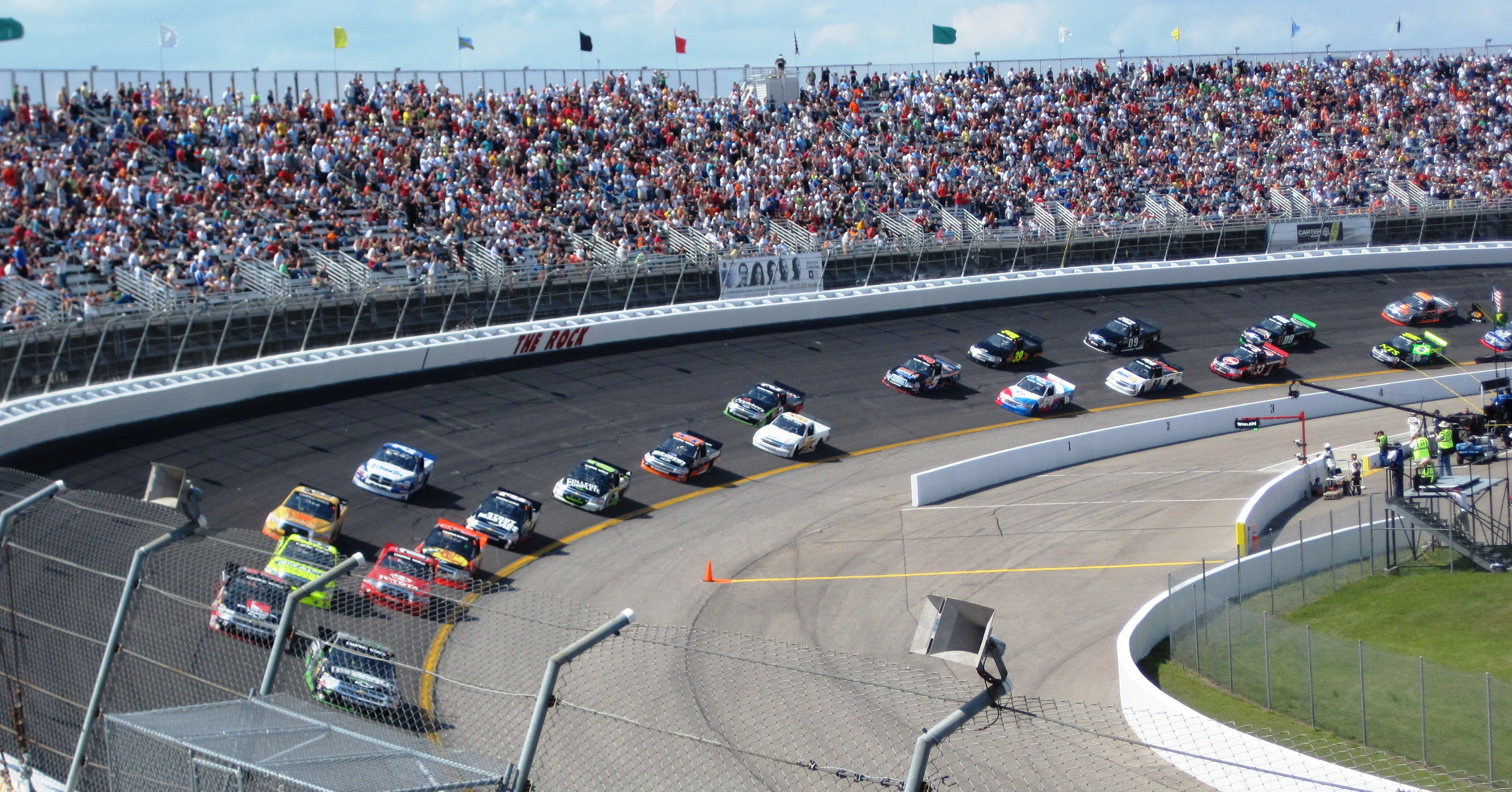
A major portion of the film was shot at Rockingham Speedway

Principal photography began on 4 May 2006 and concluded on 26 June 2006. The film was primarily shot in the United States, with additional scenes filmed at Yash Raj Studios in Mumbai.[4] Racing sequences were filmed at the Rockingham Speedway in North Carolina and the Milwaukee Mile in Wisconsin. The production featured authentic stock cars and incorporated professional stunt coordination.

Racing cars used in the film were provided by motorsport veteran Andy Hillenburg, who also trained stunt drivers and coordinated the racing scenes. Several drivers from the ARCA Re/Max Series participated in the filming, and decals from the series can be seen on the cars. Hillenburg, who previously supplied cars for Talladega Nights, reportedly reused some vehicles with modified sponsorship decals.

The film's title song was an animated musical sequence featuring all main characters and four additional animated figures. This segment was developed by Walt Disney Studios as part of their three-film collaboration with Yash Raj Films.

== Soundtrack ==
Ta Ra Rum Pum

Soundtrack album by Vishal–Shekhar
- Released: 3 April 2007
- Genre: Feature film soundtrack
- Length: 28:44
- Language: Hindi
- Label: YRF Music
- Producer: Jackie Vanjari

Vishal–Shekhar chronology
Honeymoon Travels Pvt. Ltd. (2007)	Ta Ra Rum Pum (2007)	Om Shanti Om (2007)

The film's soundtrack was composed by the duo Vishal–Shekhar, with lyrics written by Javed Akhtar. The album features seven tracks released on 3 April 2007 by YRF Music. According to the trade website Box Office India, the soundtrack sold approximately 1 million units, making it the fifteenth highest-selling Hindi film album of the year.

All tracks are written by Javed Akhtar.

No.	Title	Singer(s)	Length
1.	"Ta Ra Rum Pum"	Shaan, Mahalakshmi Iyer	03:48
2.	"Hey Shona"	Shaan, Sunidhi Chauhan	03:17
3.	"Nachle Ve"	Sonu Nigam, Sowmya Raoh	04:03
4.	"Ta Ra Rum Pum" (Version 2)	Shreya Ghoshal	05:27
5.	"Ab To Forever"	KK, Shreya Ghoshal, Vishal Dadlani	04:59
6.	"Saiyaan"	Vishal Dadlani	04:52
7.	"Aalap"	Instrumental	01:33
Total length:			29:36

=== Telugu soundtrack ===
All tracks are written by Rajshri Sudhakar.

No.	Title	Singer(s)	Length
1.	"Ta Ra Rum Pum"	Shaan, Mahalaksmi Iyer
2.	"Hey Shona"	Shaan, Mahalakshmi Iyer
3.	"Chinduley"	Vedala Hemachandra, Gayatri Ganjawala
4.	"Ta Ra Rum Pum" (Female)	Shreya Ghoshal
5.	"Natho Forever"	Shankar Mahadevan, Shreya Ghoshal, Vishal Dadlani
6.	"Vinukora"	Vedala Hemachandra

== Release ==
Ta Ra Rum Pum was theatrically released on 27 April 2007.

The film was subsequently released on DVD by Yash Raj Films on 1 September 2007.

== Reception ==
=== Box office ===
Ta Ra Rum Pum opened to strong collections in major metropolitan areas, particularly at multiplexes, though its performance at single-screen cinemas was comparatively moderate. The film collected ₹43.7 million in Mumbai during its opening week and grossed ₹114.3 million across India in the same period. The release of Spider-Man 3 in the following weeks led to a decline in overall collections; however, the film continued to perform steadily in regions like Mumbai and Delhi.

In international markets, the film had a comparable start. It debuted at number nine on the United Kingdom box office chart, earning approximately £156,000 during its opening weekend. In the United States, it grossed $425,102, while its opening in Australia brought in $90,000. Although these numbers were considered respectable, they fell below expectations for a Yash Raj Films release.

By its sixth week, the film had earned ₹377 million in India and was declared a hit by trade analysts. Overseas, Ta Ra Rum Pum accumulated approximately $2 million, with the United Kingdom emerging as its strongest international market.

=== Critical response ===
Ta Ra Rum Pum received mixed-to-positive reviews from Indian critics, with particular praise directed at the performances, emotional themes, and production values, though criticism was aimed at the screenplay and predictability. On Rotten Tomatoes, the film holds an approval rating of 50% based on eight reviews, with an average rating of 5.1/10.

In India, Ta Ra Rum Pum received a range of reviews, with many critics praising the performances and emotional appeal. Taran Adarsh of IndiaFM awarded the film 3.5 out of 5 stars, describing it as "a heartwarming story that touches an emotional chord." He particularly highlighted Saif Ali Khan's likability and Rani Mukerji’s restrained yet effective performance, concluding that the film had "speed, sentiment, and soul." India Today echoed similar sentiments, noting its “glossy packaging,” emotionally resonant themes, and star appeal, though also acknowledging the film's heavy borrowing from Hollywood templates such as Days of Thunder (1990) and The Pursuit of Happyness (2006).

On the other hand, some Indian reviewers criticized the film's predictability and emotional excess. Rajeev Masand of CNN-IBN criticized the film for its lack of originality, noting that the plot borrows heavily from Life Is Beautiful (1997), In America (2002), and Cinderella Man (2005). Anand Vaishnav of Rediff.com commented that the film “races ahead in the first half” but loses momentum later, making its climax feel underwhelming.^{4} Filmibeat offered a mixed take, praising the soundtrack and visual execution, but noting that the “formulaic and stretched” story undermined its impact. Jeevi of Idlebrain.com called it a "decent one-time watch," particularly for family audiences, though he found little narrative novelty, especially in the second half.

Internationally, the film received a similarly divided response. Rachel Saltz of The New York Times described it as “a sentimental journey powered by formula and emotion.” She acknowledged the film's sincerity but felt its structure lacked surprises and leaned too heavily on melodrama. Jaspreet Pandohar of the BBC rated the film 2 out of 5 stars, stating that while Khan delivered a spirited performance, the story was weighed down by clichés and an overuse of sentimentality. Nell Minow of Common Sense Media offered a more favorable view, awarding it 3 out of 5 stars and highlighting its uplifting messages about perseverance and family, though cautioning viewers about themes of financial hardship and medical stress.

== Accolades ==
Award	Date of ceremony (Note: Date is linked to the article about the awards held that year, wherever possible.)	Category	Recipient(s)	Result	Ref.
Screen Awards	10 January 2008	Best Child Artist	Ali Haji	Nominated	
Screen Awards	10 January 2008	Best Child Artist	Angelina Idnani	Nominated	
Producers Guild Film Awards (Note: Previously known as Apsara Film & Television Producers Guild Awards.)	30 March 2008	Best Cinematography	Binod Pradhan	Nominated	
Producers Guild Film Awards	30 March 2008	Best Special Effects	Tata Elxsi - VCL	Nominated	
Sabsey Favourite Kaun Awards	23 December 2008	Sabsey Favourite Heroine	Rani Mukerji	Won	

== See also ==
- List of highest-grossing Bollywood films
- List of Hindi films of 2007
- List of films set in New York City
