= Dance of Ganesha =

- Directed by: Bikas Ranjan Mishra
- Written by: Bikas Ranjan Mishra
- Produced by: Pankaj Dubey
- Production company: Sadak Chhaap Films
- Release date: 8 October 2011 (Pusan International Film Festival)
- Country: India
- Language: No Dialogue

Dance of Ganesha, also known as Naach Ganesh, is a 2011 Indian short film directed by Bikas Ranjan Mishra, and produced by Pankaj Dubey. The film had its world premiere at the 16th Busan International Film Festival.

== Plot ==
A tribal dancer is caught in his daily struggle for survival in an automobile factory. The burden to earn a living for his family and preserve his family tradition of ritual Ganesha dancing is humongous. His two roles, as a bread winner for his two kids, a wife and an ailing father and as the magnificent elephant god Ganesha, is so diverse that his journey from factory to village looks almost like time travel and his existence schizophrenic! Ganesha, the dancer lives in the perpetual fear of the day when he will have to make a choice between livelihood and art/tradition.
