= Khamosh =

1986 Indian thriller film by Vidhu Vinod Chopra

- Directed by: Vidhu Vinod Chopra
- Written by: Vidhu Vinod Chopra; Ranjit Kapoor; Saeed Akhtar Mirza; Sudhir Mishra; Kundan Shah; Manjul Sinha
- Produced by: Vidhu Vinod Chopra
- Starring: Amol Palekar; Naseeruddin Shah; Shabana Azmi; Pankaj Kapoor; Soni Razdan; Sushma Seth; Ajit Vachani; Sadashiv Amrapurkar; Pavan Malhotra; Avtar Gill; Sudhir Mishra
- Cinematography: Binod Pradhan; Pramod Pradhan
- Edited by: Renu Saluja; Reena Mohan
- Music by: Kersi Lord; Uttam Singh
- Release date: 14 March 1986 (India)
- Country: India
- Language: Hindi
- Budget: ₹8 lakh

Khamosh (transl. Silent) is 1986 Indian Hindi-language thriller film directed and produced by Vidhu Vinod Chopra. The film starred Naseeruddin Shah, Shabana Azmi, Amol Palekar, Soni Razdan and Pankaj Kapoor. The film became notable for actors Palekar, Razdan and Azmi portraying fictional versions of themselves.

== Plot ==
Soni Razdan is a budding actress. Naseeruddin Shah is a military man. Amol Palekar is an established actor. Shabana Azmi is a fellow actress. Ajit Vachani is a film producer and Pankaj Kapoor is his mentally unstable brother. Sushma Seth plays Mrs Bhal, a retired actress now doing character roles and pushing her reluctant daughter into the film industry to obtain fame and fortune.

The filming unit enters Pahalgam in Kashmir for their next film. Razdan mysteriously commits suicide. The police are about to call it an open and shut case when Shah enters the scene. He pretends to be a special officer sent to investigate the case, but subsequently his cover is blown. The police come to arrest him just as he about to accuse Mrs Bhal of Razdan's murder as he had found Razdan's missing earring hidden under Mrs Bhal's mattress in her hotel room. Shah then reveals his true identity as Razdan's estranged brother and states that some days before the "suicide", Razdan had sent him a letter that she had gotten the lead role for a prestigious project. As such, he refuses to believe that she committed suicide. The crew accept that Razdan had indeed got the coveted role, but they are less enthusiastic about co-operating now with the police and investigation of her murder.

The only person who believes that Razdan was murdered is Azmi, who heard Razdan practising her lines until late at night. Azmi realises that Razdan was portraying a village girl who spoke no English, but that she had started shouting something in English before she became silent. She agrees to help Shah catch the culprit, and they join forces but more murders happen—first with Mrs Bhal is killed and then the male housekeeper.

Eventually, all clues point to Vachchani, who confesses that his brother Kapoor killed Razdan in a rage when she spurned his advances. Vachchani confesses that he was just covering for him, because his brother was mentally ill. Kapoor goes on a shooting spree, killing Vachchani in the process. It seems like the mystery has been solved but Shah realizes two things: Kapoor's revolver had already been emptied before he "shot" his brother dead, and Vachchani had posted a mysterious letter to his lawyer.

Azmi knows where the actual gun used to kill Vachchani is, but finds it missing from the props and costumes box.

It is then revealed that it was Amol Palekar who killed Soni as she pestered him and threatened to defame him. While killing Soni he was seen by the producer who became his accomplice. He later killed Mrs Bhal and the producer and then dumped a waiter in the river so that all suspicion came on the waiter. He reveals this all to Shabana and tries to kill her, but she is saved by Naseeruddin Shah—who read Vachchani's letter confessing his part in the crime—by shooting and finally killing Palekar.

== Cast ==
- Shabana Azmi
- Amol Palekar
- Naseeruddin Shah as Capt. Rajeev Bakshi
- Soni Razdan
- Sadashiv Amrapurkar as Chandran (Film Director)
- Sushma Seth as Leela Bahal
- Pankaj Kapur
- Pawan Malhotra
- Kamal Chopra
- Virendra Saxena as Shuklaji
- Avtar Gill as Dilawar Khan (Film Actor-Villain)
- Ajit Vachani as Dayal Prabhu
- Uday Chandra
- Shakti Singh
