= Picasso (film) =

- Official release poster
- Directed by: Abhijeet Mohan Warang
- Screenplay by: Abhijeet Mohan Warang
- Produced by: Shiladitya Bora
- Starring: Prasad Oak; Samay Sanjeev Tambe; Ashwini Mukadam; Vitthal Gaonkar; Nilkanth Sawant
- Cinematography: Stanley Mudda
- Edited by: Aashay Gatade
- Music by: Anand Lunkad
- Production company: Platoon One Films
- Distributed by: Amazon Prime Video
- Release dates: 28 September 2019 (Jagran Film Festival); 19 March 2021
- Country: India
- Language: Marathi

Picasso is a 2019 Indian Marathi-language drama film written and directed by debutant Abhijeet Mohan Warang. Produced by Shiladitya Bora under Platoon One Films, the film stars Prasad Oak, Samay Sanjeev Tambe and Ashwini Mukadam in pivotal roles. Becoming the first Marathi film to document Dashavatara, one of the earliest forms of folk theatre in its original format, Picasso had its world premiere at the Jagran and Brahmaputra Valley film festivals both being held in Mumbai and Guwahati in September 2019. However, failing to see a theatrical release, the film was digitally premiered through Amazon Prime Video on 19 March 2021.

== Plot ==
A young seventh grade student, Gandharva Pandurag Gawade, from a remote village in the Konkan belt of Maharashtra, is selected for the national level of the Picasso Arts Scholarship. The winner of the competition gets to travel to Spain – Picasso's birthplace – to hone their art. Gandharva informs his parents about his selection and also a fee that needs to be paid in order to proceed to the next level of the competition – but his parents tell him that they cannot afford it.

Gandharva's father Pandurang is a Dashavatari artist and is performing in the nearby village. He was once an accomplished actor, but his alcohol addiction now stands in the way of him performing. With an ailing mother and a father struggling with debt, the chances of Gandharva being able to participate look slim. Will Pandurang be able to fight his demons and bring his art back to life – and will Gandharva be able to fulfil his dreams of going to Spain?

Picasso is a story about fathers and sons, hopes and dreams - of life imitating art, and how art can heal lives.

== Cast ==
- Prasad Oak as Pandurang Gawade
- Samay Sanjeev Tambe as Gandharva Pandurang Gawade
- Ashwini Mukadam as Mother
- Vitthal Gaonkar as Narad
- Nilkanth Sawant as Mohini

== Production ==
Picasso is Shiladitya Bora’s maiden Marathi production of his Platoon Films banner. The shooting for the film was completed in 27 days, starting in August 2018. It was shot in and around Kudal, the Konkan belt of Maharashtra. Tushar Paranjape (writer of Killa) served as the creative director for this film. The official poster of the film was released by Mahesh Bhatt, who announced it through his Twitter account on 23 September 2019.

== Release ==
Picasso was screened at the 10th Jagran Film Festival held in Mumbai on 28 September 2019, and on the following day (29 September 2019), at the 7th Brahmaputra Valley Film Festival held in Guwahati. The film was not released in theatres, but Amazon Prime Video distributed the film which debuted on the streaming platform from 19 March 2021.

== Accolades ==
Year	Award	Category	Nominee	Result	Ref.
22 March 2021	National Film Awards	Special Mention	Abhijeet Mohan Warang	Won	
