= Line of Descent =

2019 Indian crime film

- Official Poster
- Directed by: Rohit Karn Batra
- Written by: Rohit Karn Batra
- Produced by: Rohit Karn Batra; Guy J. Louthan
- Starring: See Cast
- Cinematography: John Stokes
- Music by: Mario Grigorov
- Production companies: Brillstein Entertainment Partners; Invisible Man Pictures; Level Street Pictures
- Distributed by: ZEE5 (India); Gravitas Ventures (United States)
- Release dates: 15 November 2019 (NYC South Asian Film Festival); 13 December 2019 (United States); 20 December 2019 (India)
- Running time: 108 minutes
- Countries: India; United States
- Languages: English; Hindi
- Box office: $3,599

Line of Descent is a 2019 Indian crime drama film written and directed by Rohit Karn Batra (in his directorial debut). The film stars Ronit Roy, Neeraj Kabi, and Ali Haji as the three brothers of a mafia patriarch who fight over the future of their crime family. Brendan Fraser, Prem Chopra, and Abhay Deol play supporting roles. The film was previously known as The Field. It had a simultaneous release in theaters and video on demand in the United States on 13 December 2019. It was released on ZEE5 on 20 December 2019 in India.

== Plot ==
In Delhi, India, the Sinha mafia family is led by Prithvi after previous boss Bharat Sinha committed suicide due to the family's declining business. The family is celebrating the birthday of their newest member, Nya. Prithvi's youngest brother, Suraj, wants nothing to do with the family's criminal activities and dreams of living a normal life with his girlfriend Seema. However, at the party, a gang of boys stalks and tries to abuse Seema, and Suraj comes to her aid. Later, Suraj accidentally shoots a homeowner while trying to show off his gun to Prithvi.

Meanwhile, Officer Raghav is investigating the Sinha family's criminal activities and meets with Deputy Commissioner Daniel Bates to discuss Bharat Sinha's involvement in real estate pirating. The flashback reveals that Bharat's criminal career started after his twin brother, Prithvi, died due to a tragic accident that left him unable to pay the hospital bills. Bharat sold his successful restaurant to pay for Prithvi's treatment, but the money never arrived, and Prithvi died. This incident left a hole in Bharat's heart and led him to partner with a British gangster, Morris Burns, to grow his criminal empire.

After Bharat's suicide due to his grief, Prithvi decides to leave the family business and focus on their electronics store, but Sidd, his older brother, wants to continue the criminal activities. Sidd sets up a robbery at the store to provoke Prithvi, and when Prithvi investigates, Sidd kills him. However, Prithvi survives, and Raghav meets with Sidd and Suraj to question Sidd's motives. Sidd lies and leaves, while Suraj seeks Charu's help, an undercover officer who is part of Raghav's operation.

Sidd hires a sniper to kill Suraj, but he accidentally shoots Seema. Seema's father blames Suraj for her death. Sidd ambushes Prithvi and finally kills him. Sidd hides Prithvi's body and kills a witness who saw him burning it. Suraj decides to help Raghav in exchange for his safety and goes to get Sidd's confession after talking to Charu. However, the plan fails, and while looking for Sidd, Suraj gets the guns of Sidd's men and shoots the men along with injuring Sidd.

A few days after the incident, Raghav visits Suraj in jail as being part of the Sinha mafia family, informing him that his mother has left India for the U.A.E. He reveals that he helped Suraj and Charu put an end to the mafia family in Delhi and plans to speak with a lawyer to have Suraj's sentence reduced. Raghav shares information about Sidd's affair and how Pritvi's body was found near the witness's family. He reveals that Sidd had hired a sniper to kill Seema, but Raghav managed to get him to confess.

In a shocking turn of events, Prithvi paid Charu to protect Suraj from Sidd and arranged a meeting between them. After Prithvi's death, Charu set a trap for Sidd and Suraj. Raghav informs Suraj that Nya is not Siddharth's daughter but Prithvi's, causing Suraj's sister-in-law to suffer a mental breakdown and be sent to a psychiatric hospital. Nya is currently staying with her sister. The film concludes with Raghav asking Suraj if he would be willing to let Nya become a part of his family since Raghav and his wife are unable to conceive, and Suraj agrees, starting a new beginning for his legacy.

== Cast ==
- Ronit Roy as Prithvi Sinha, the leader of his mafia family
- Brendan Fraser as Charlie 'Charu' Jolpin, an undercover cop brings the mafia family toward their downfall
- Abhay Deol as Officer Raghav, an officer who wants to bring the Sinha mafia family down
- Ali Haji as Suraj Sinha, Prithvi's youngest brother
- Neeraj Kabi as Siddharth Sinha, Prithvi's middle brother, who secretly wants to get rid of Prithvi and his family
- Prem Chopra as Bharat Sinha, the father of Prithvi and Siddharth
- Gopal Datt as Arun, an undercover cop working with Charu
- Shiben Mohanty as young Bharat Sinha
- Anisha Angelina Victor as Seema, Suraj's girlfriend
- Jagen Mohanty as young Prithvi
- Charlotte Poutrel as Racheal, Siddharth's girlfriend and accomplice
- Max Beesley as Commissioner Bates
- Priyanka Setia as Sujatha Sinha
- Ekavali Khanna as Neha Sinha
- Abeal Siddiq as young Bharat Sinha
- Christian Mucci as young Shah

== Production ==
Though set in India, Batra said Line of Descent should be seen as an international film, explaining that though he could have set the story in a typical American city, he chose to film in the country "because the visual energy of India is very different, so I thought why not use that." He also states that "Filmmaking sometimes ends up being very local for the country a film is made for, but at the same time we are in a very global world, so I think films should reflect this more ... That's why Brendan's character is so interesting in that he grew up in the U.S. and is then in India."

Pre-production started on 18 April 2016 and filming began on 18 June 2016. Brendan Fraser was in Mumbai for two weeks in May to film his scenes, which feature dialogue in Hindi and English. Speaking of Fraser's time filming in India, Batra said: "It was fantastic. He had a lot of respect for the actors. For instance, Neeraj Kabi was in Talvar [based on a real-life murder mystery that premiered at Toronto] and Fraser actually happened to see that film on the flight to Mumbai."

== Reception ==
Noel Murray of Los Angeles Times wrote, "Rohit Karn Batra does a fine job of exploring the dynamics of a potentially lethal sibling rivalry; and he gets an entertaining wild-card performance from American Canadian actor Brendan Fraser." Gautaman Bhaskaran of Arab News wrote, "Line of Descent is tightly and imaginatively scripted. Its exposition of organized crime is masterful, and some brilliant performances, especially from Deol, Roy and Kabi add a dash of class to an otherwise gritty enterprise. A compelling dramatic arc is established from the start in this fast-paced thriller, and the themes of guilt and atonement permeate throughout the movie, with both coming home to roost for the Sinha family in a touching final sequence."

The film was released theatrically in the United Arab Emirates on 28 January 2021. The film had an opening weekend gross of $3,599, ranking in tenth place.
