= Chupke Se =

2003 Bollywood Romantic comedy film

- Directed by: Shona Urvashi
- Screenplay by: Abbas Tyrewala; Shona Urvashi
- Story by: Shona Urvashi
- Produced by: Jayshree Makhija; Nirmal Anand
- Starring: Zulfi Syed; Masumeh; Rati Agnihotri
- Edited by: Aadesh Verma
- Music by: Vishal Bhardwaj; Ranjit Barot
- Release date: 12 September 2003
- Running time: 160 mins
- Country: India
- Language: Hindi

Chupke Se (English: Secretly), is a 2003 Bollywood romantic comedy film, directed by Shona Urvashi. It stars Zulfi Syed, Masumeh, Rati Agnihotri, Tinnu Anand, Om Puri, Reema Lagoo, and Dilip Prabhawalkar. The film's soundtrack was composed by Vishal Bhardwaj, while the lyrics were written by Gulzar.

== Plot ==
Megha Timghure (Masumeh) is a plain-looking middle-class girl, living with her Mum, Laxmi (Reema Lagoo), and Dad (Dilip Prabhawalkar), who is employed as an Income Tax Officer. She desires to become a model and a beauty queen. At a party, she is wrongly introduced as Sarika Verma and meets two eligible young men, Rizwan, and Varun Arya (Zulfi Syed). She expresses her wish to become a model and be referred to Almera Kochar (Rati Agnihotri), who has a reputation for bringing out the best in every model, and making them beauty queens. Almera meets with Sarika / Megha, and accepts her as a student, and makes her sign a contract. What Sarika does not know is that she has now become a pawn in a devious plot concocted to protect millions gained by criminal activities on the black market.

== Cast ==
- Zulfi Syed as Varun Arya
- Masumeh as Megha Timghure/Sarika Mehra
- Om Puri as Qasim Khan Qayamat
- Rati Agnihotri as Almera Kochar
- Tinnu Anand as Tiny Kochar
- Dilip Prabhawalkar as Babanrao Timghure (Megha's father)
- Reema Lagoo as Laxmi (Megha's mother)
- Jayant Kripalani as Anand Arya (Varun's father)
- Raj Zutshi as Sunel
- Peeya Rai Chowdhary as Sheetal (Megha's friend)
- Raman Lamba as Rizwan
- Kurush Deboo as Shop Manager

== Soundtrack ==
Chupke Se

Soundtrack album by Vishal Bhardwaj
- Released: 27 May 2003
- Genre: Feature film soundtrack
- Length: 27:58
- Language: Hindi
- Label: Saregama
External audio
- Audio Jukebox on YouTube

The soundtrack of Chupke Se consists of 6 songs composed by Vishal Bhardwaj, the lyrics of which were written by Gulzar and Abbas Tyrewala.

| # | Title | Singer(s) | Length |
|---|---|---|---|
| 1 | "Kajrare Kajrare Nainawale" | Daler Mehndi | 04:55 |
| 2 | "Kehte Kehte Ruk Jatee Hai" | Asha Bhosle, Lucky Ali | 04:46 |
| 3 | "Koi Toh Ho Jiske Liye Jina Ho" | Alka Yagnik, Udit Narayan | 04:28 |
| 4 | "Dildara" (Mano Agar Dil Se Toh Khuda) | Zubeen Garg, Gayatri Ganjawala | 03:36 |
| 5 | "Jeele Jeele Jeene De" | Ranjit Barot, KK, Alka Yagnik | 03:45 |
| 6 | "Kafi Nahin Jo Bhi Hai" | Alka Yagnik | 05:08 |

== Critical reception ==
Taran Adarsh of Bollywood Hungama gave the film a rating of 1.5 out of 5 saying that, "Director Shona Urvashi gets the technique of film-making right, but is let down by the writing [Abbas Tyrewala, Shona herself]. The script fluctuates from plausible to implausible with regularity and that's where it falters." Ron Ahluwalia of PlanetBollywood.com gave the film a rating of 6 out of 10 saying that, "Chupke Se... is an attempt at an entertaining venture that just doesn't cut it. Ridden by cliches, incongruities, unnecessary use of derogatory language, below average direction and a supersaturated plot, this movie can simply be judged as amateur." Namrata Joshi of Outlook gave the film a rating of 2 out of 5 saying that, "Chupke Se is an earnest first attempt which could have been so much more fun. The gags and pranks don't really sparkle."
