= Parapaar =

- Directed by: Sanjoy Nag
- Written by: Moti Nandi
- Produced by: Purti Entertainment Pvt. Ltd.
- Starring: Ahmed Rubel; Rituparna Sengupta; Paoli Dam; Bratya Basu
- Cinematography: Indranil Mukherjee
- Edited by: Sanjib Datta
- Music by: Sourendra and Soumyojit
- Release date: 14 November 2014
- Country: India
- Language: Bengali

Parapaar (Bengali: পারাপার) is a 2014 film directed by Sanjoy Nag is based on the Moti Nandy novel. A convict, Rudra (Ahmed Rubel), returns home to his wife (Rituparna Sengupta) and two kids after serving a 14-year jail term. He comes back to find his home-maker wife transformed into a woman who had grown stronger over the years while fending for herself and her kids. The film also stars Paoli Dam and Bratya Basu. A 'tribute promo' was launched on 31 August 2014 to commemorate the birth anniversary of Rituparno Ghosh.

== Cast ==
- Ahmed Rubel as Rudra
- Rituparna Sengupta as Damini
- Paoli Dam as Urmila
- Bratya Basu as Gopal

== Crew ==
- Cinematography - Indranil Mukherjee
- Editor - Sanjib Datta
- Sound Recordist - Gautam Nag
- Sound Re-recordist - Anirban Sengupta Dipankar Jojo Chaki
- Production Designer - Sushanta Paul
- Assistant Directors - Subroto Ghosh, Mrityunjay Pramanik, Monalisa Giri, Debanjana Roy

== Music ==
- Composers - Sourendra and Soumyojit
- Lyricist - Srijato
- Singers - Asha Bhonsle , Papon Subhomita Kaushiki Chakrabarty Ashtam Mandal
