= Chauranga =

- Theatrical Release Poster
- Directed by: Bikas Ranjan Mishra
- Written by: Bikas Ranjan Mishra
- Produced by: Onir; Sanjay Suri; Mohan Mulani
- Starring: Sanjay Suri; Tannishtha Chatterjee; Soham Maitra
- Cinematography: Ramanuj Dutta
- Production company: Anticlock Films
- Distributed by: Anticlock Films
- Release dates: 21 October 2014 (Mumbai Film Festival); 8 January 2016 (India)
- Running time: 88 minutes
- Country: India
- Language: Hindi
- Budget: approx. ₹8 crore (US$830,000)

Chauranga is a 2016 Hindi film. It is the debut feature film of Indian writer-director Bikas Ranjan Mishra, produced by Onir and Sanjay Suri. The film was developed at the Screenwriters' Lab organized by the National Film Development Corporation of India in collaboration with the Locarno Film Festival and the ScriptStation of Berlinale Talent Campus, a part of the Berlin International Film Festival. The film won the Golden Gateway of India Award for Best Film (India Gold 2014) at the 16th Mumbai Film Festival.

The film was released worldwide on 8 January 2016.

== Plot ==
This is based on Dalit-Brahmin relations in the villages and shows how Dalits are exploited. A fourteen-year-old Dalit boy (Soham Maitra) is growing up in an unnamed corner of India. His dream is to go to a town school like his elder brother (Riddhi Sen), and his reality is to look after the pig that his family owns. His only escape is to sit atop a Jamun tree and adore his beloved (Ena Saha) passing by on her scooter. His unspoken love is as true as his mother's helplessness, who cleans the cowsheds of the local Brahmin's mansion, with whom she also has a secret liaison. When the boy's elder brother comes on a vacation to the village, he soon finds out about his younger brother's infatuation. The learned elder brother makes him realize the need to express his love and helps him write a love letter.

== Cast ==
- Soham Maitra as Santu
- Ena Saha as Mona
- Riddhi Sen as Bajrangi
- Sanjay Suri as Dhaval
- Tannishtha Chatterjee as Dhaniya
- Dhritiman Chatterjee as Lali Pandey, the blind priest
- Swatilekha Sengupta as Dhaval's mother
- Arpita Chatterjee as Nidhi
- Anshuman Jha as Raghu
- Delzad Hiwale as Shambhu

== Production ==
=== Development ===
Bikas Mishra's script was selected by the National Film Development Corporation in 2010 for its Screenwriters' Lab organized at Locarno Film Festival. The script was later selected by Berlinale Talent Campus' ScriptStation program. Marten Rabarts, the artistic director of Amsterdam-based Binger FilmLab consulted Bikas on the script at both the labs.

== Awards ==
- Grand Jury Prize for Best Film at 13th Indian Film Festival Of Los Angeles 2015 (IFFLA)
- Golden Gateway of India for Best Film (India Gold) at 16th Mumbai Film Festival 2014
- Chauranga won "Incredible India" Award for the best project of co-production market, at the NFDC Film Bazaar, International Film Festival of India, Goa 2011 and Script Funding from Goteborg International Film Festival, Sweden.
