= Paathshaala =

2010 Indian drama film

- Theatrical release poster
- Directed by: Milind Ukey
- Screenplay by: Ahmed Khan
- Story by: Ahmed Khan
- Produced by: Ahmed Khan; Shaira Khan
- Starring: Shahid Kapoor; Ayesha Takia; Nana Patekar
- Cinematography: Basha Lal
- Edited by: Ashfaque Makrani
- Music by: Songs: Hanif Shaikh; Score: Salim–Sulaiman
- Distributed by: Eros Entertainment; Paperdoll Entertainment
- Release date: 16 April 2010
- Country: India
- Language: Hindi
- Budget: ₹ 14 crore
- Box office: ₹ 17 crore

Paathshaala (transl. School) is a 2010 Indian Hindi-language drama film directed by Milind Ukey starring Shahid Kapoor, Ayesha Takia, Shraddha Arya, Ali Haji, Sushant Singh and Nana Patekar. The story revolving around children on a school campus is a commentary on the Indian education system and its shortcomings. Kapoor plays an English and music teacher. It is inspired by the Marathi film Shaala, also directed by Milind Ukey. Paathshaala was released on 16 April 2010.

== Plot ==
The story begins with a young man, Rahul Prakash Udyavar, who is hired as an English teacher at Saraswati Vidya Mandir, a reputed school in Mumbai. On his first day, Rahul attends a staff meeting headed by the principal, Aditya Sahay, who announces that he will soon send an email containing new policies for the school's further development. In the next few days, Rahul strikes instant rapport with the students and teachers alike.

One week after Rahul's employment, the teachers become upset after receiving the email, which states that the classroom body will be increased disproportionately. It also mandates that all students must participate in extracurricular activities. The students, parents, and teachers become unhappy with the school management's decision to suddenly raise the fees. The teachers approach the principal for help, but he defends the decision. The teachers are shocked because Principal Sahay had built the school's reputation for 32 years. They contemplate resignation but discover that the management will promptly replace them with a new, more cooperative staff.

The situation turns grave as the school management becomes overambitious with its growth and involves media planners in the extracurricular activities. This demands the involvement of students in TV reality shows and other media PR activities used for building the school's image in public. Left with no alternative, the teachers comply with the new policies and prepare the students to participate in reality shows and other competitions. However, this begins to stress the students, leading to unforeseen ramifications. Eventually, with the help of the school peon, Waghmare, Rahul accesses the file that Sahay had received from the school management, and he finally learns the truth.

The next day, Rahul unites the teachers and students, and they go on a strike. The school's strike garners the attention of the media, who begin to question Sahay. Rahul coaxes Sahay to disclose the truth to everyone. Sahay reveals that the school management wanted more profits and ordered him to develop its facilities. They threatened to demolish the school if Sahay did not comply. However, they refused to provide him with financial support, and Sahay couldn't secure any loans for the school either. Sahay admits his failure as a principal and decides to resign. However, the teachers and students sympathize with Sahay's helplessness and dissuade him from resignation. The film ends with the media criticising the commercialization of schools and Sahay resuming his work as the principal.

== Cast ==
- Shahid Kapoor as Rahul Prakash Udyavar, English teacher
- Nana Patekar as Principal Aditya Sahay
- Ayesha Takia as Anjali Mathur, nutritionist
- Swini Khara as Swini Srivastav
- Dwij Yadav as Vijay Damodhar
- Master Ali Haji as Rohan Ahuja
- Avika Gor as Avika Panday
- Sushant Singh as Vijendra Chauhan, sports teacher
- Saurabh Shukla as School Manager Lallan Sharma
- Nassar Abdullah as Trustee Dholakia
- Shraddha Arya as Natasha "Nats" Singh
- Sanatan Modi as Farooque Sir, teacher
- Anjan Srivastav as Peon Waghmare
- Vicky Ahuja as Rajveer Bahl
- Preeti Koppikar as Mrs. Shinde, Marathi teacher
- Sushmita Mukherjee as Mrs. Bose, Geography teacher
- Kainaz Motivala as Shailey Kapoor
- Manas Adhiya as Nutty
- Kurush Deboo as Cyrus Hansotia, Teacher
- Sagar Kale as Damodhar

== Production ==
Most of Paathshaala was shot at Film City in Mumbai where the set of the Saraswati Vidya Mandir school was constructed.

== Music ==
Paathshaala

Soundtrack album by Hanif Shaikh Vijay Lama
- Released: 15 March 2010
- Genre: Feature film soundtrack
- Label: T-Series

The audio CD was released in March 2010. It contains 10 songs, including five original songs, four remixes, and one theme song. The song "Mujhe Teri" is based on the Nepali song "Timro Tyo" which was sung by Akansha Lama. She got to sing the Hindi version.

1. "Aye Khuda" (Salim Merchant) – 4:42
2. "Khushnuma" (Vishal Dadlani) – 3:26
3. "Bekarar" (Lucky Ali, Abrar-ul-Haq) – 4:24
4. "Mujhe Teri" (Tulsi Kumar, Hanif Sheikh, Akansha Lama) – 4:07
5. "Teri Marzi Aye Khuda" (Kailash Kher) – 4:41
6. "Aye Khuda" – Remix (Salim Merchant) – 5:29
7. "Mujhe Teri" – Remix (Tulsi Kumar, Hanif Sheikh, Akansha Lama) – 4:24
8. "Teri Marzi Aye Khuda" – Remix (Kailash Kher) – 4:07
9. "Bekarar" – Remix (Lucky Ali) – 4:06
10. "Paathshaala" – Theme

== Reception ==
=== Critical reception ===
Paathshaala received mixed reviews from top critics in India. It received 3 out of 5 from Indiatimes. The Times of India also gave the film 3 out of 5 saying, "Go for some serious viewing." AOL India's Noyon Jyoti Parasara gave the film a mere 1.5 out of 5 and said, "Paathshaala does not have a screenplay. And it has bad dialogues made only worse by loud acting by most of the cast." Indiafm's Taran Adarsh gave 2 out of 5 saying, "On the whole, Paathshaala is a well-intentioned film, but lacks clarity thanks to an uninspiring screenplay." Paathshaala was given 1.5 out of 5 by Rajeev Masand of CNN-IBN. According to him, "the script includes sheer melodrama and over-exaggeration in its effort to shamelessly manipulate you into caring for its characters."

=== Box office ===
The movie received a grand opening all over India. Ajmer, Jaipur, Jodhpur, and Udaipur started with 40–70 per cent which went higher in subsequent shows. In Hyderabad, Punjab and Indore it opened to 50–60 per cent and was expected to go up. In Mumbai Cinemax, Fun Republic and Fame Adlabs also received a good turnover on the opening day. Paathshaala grossed around ₹ 10 crore net over its first week. The film started slow but managed to pick up places on Saturday and remained steady on the lower side over the weekdays. Although the second week was initially projected to earn more at the box office, earnings increased 70% and the film was declared an "Average hit".
