= Bikas Mishra =

Indian screenwriter and film director

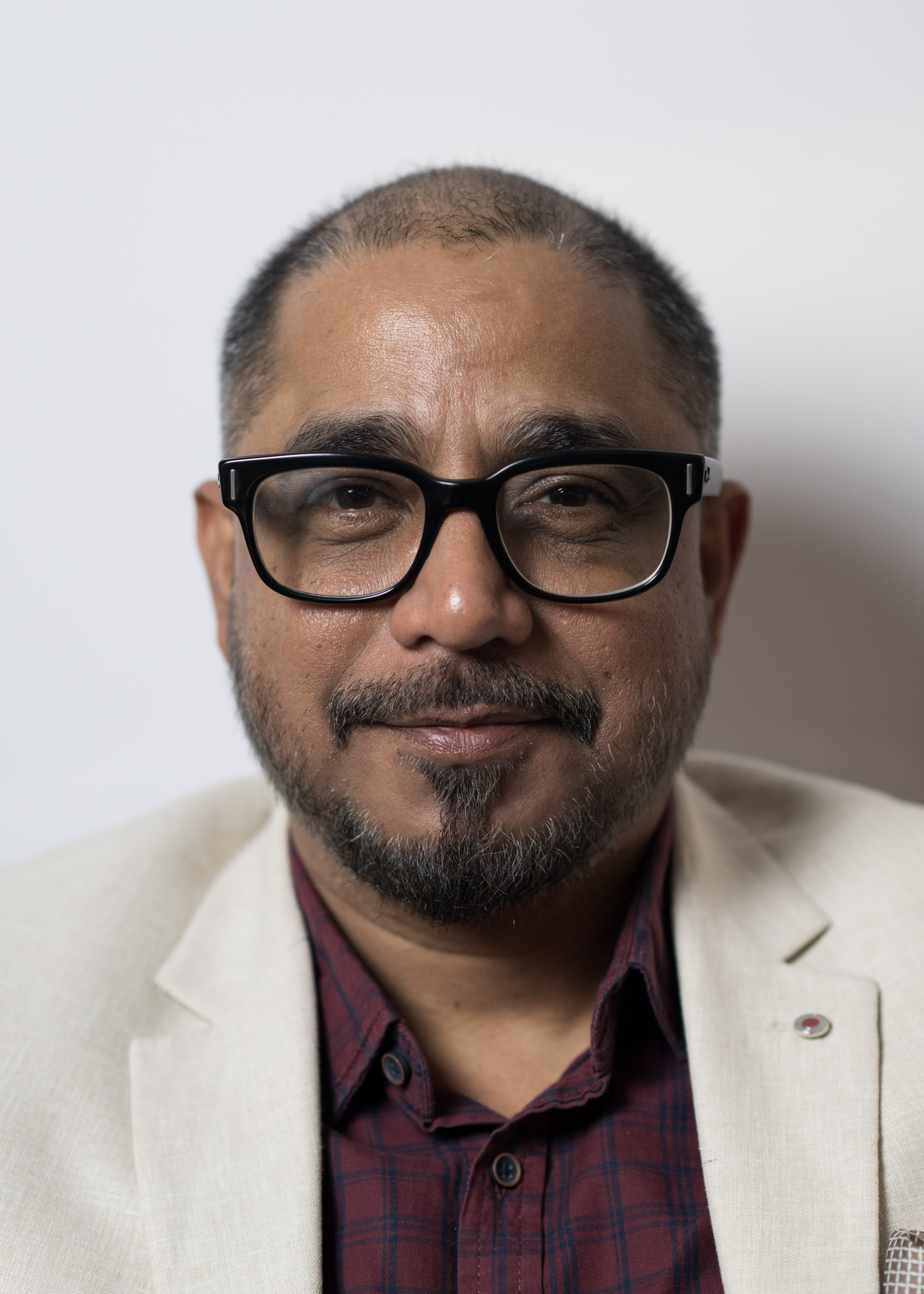
- Mishra in 2025
- Other name: Bikas Ranjan Mishra
- Occupations: Screenwriter, director
- Notable work: Chauranga, Naach Ganesha
- Awards: India Gold (Mumbai Film Festival 2014), Grand Jury Prize at Indian Film Festival of Los Angeles (IFFLA 2015), Best Project at Film Bazaar, Goa 2011
- Website: bikasmishra.com

Bikas Ranjan Mishra is an Indian screenwriter and film director. His first feature film Chauranga released in January 2016. The film won awards at Mumbai Film Festival and Indian Film Festival of Los Angeles (IFFLA).

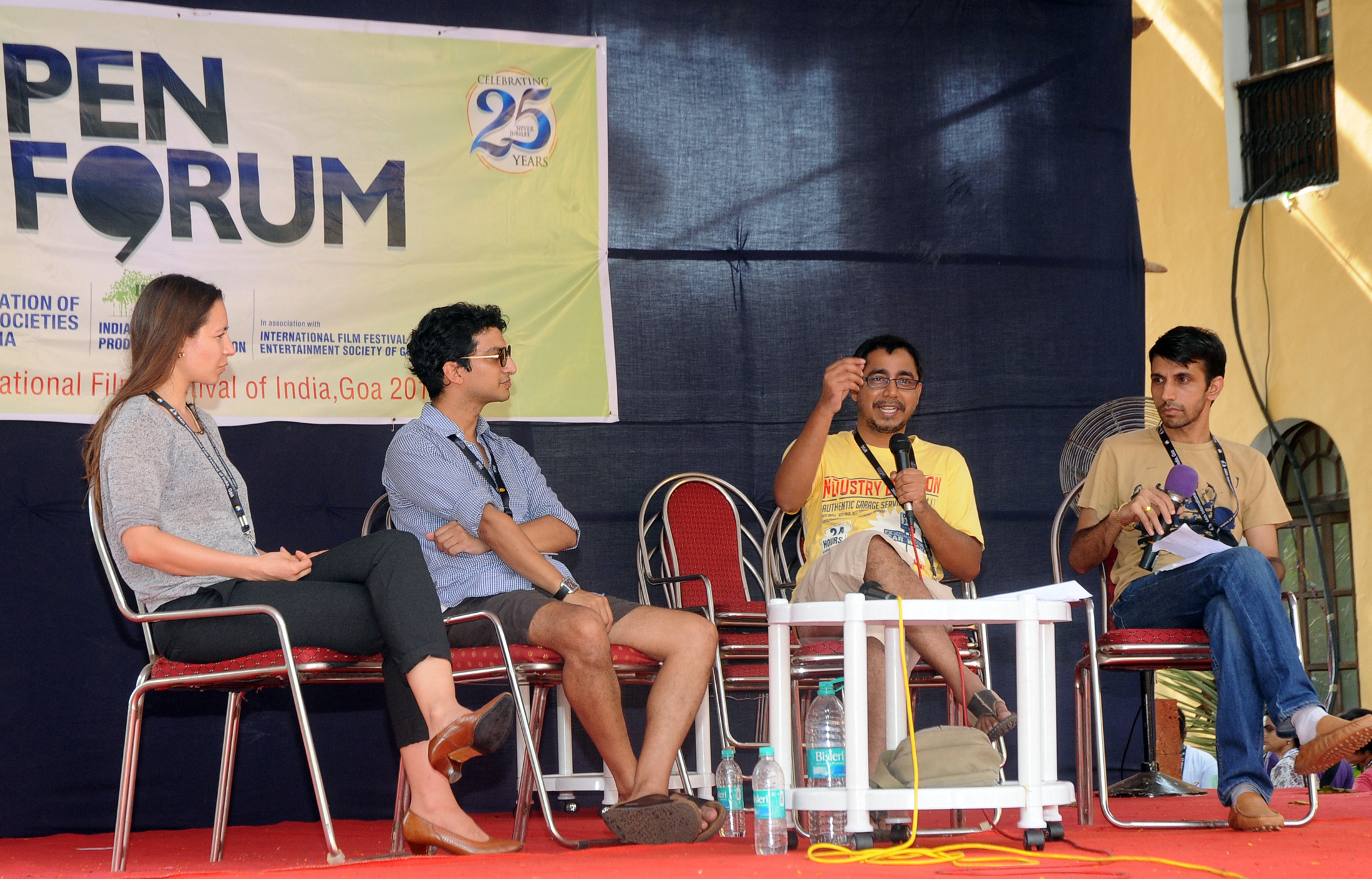
Mishra (second from right), IFFI (2013)

== Career ==
His short film Dance of Ganesha had its world premiere at the 16th Busan International Film Festival, and its European premiere at the 41st International Film Festival Rotterdam. The film was also shown at Clermont Ferrand Short Film Festival in France. He is a recipient of the Hubert Bals Fund for script development.

He has directed a film adaptation of renowned Bengali playwright Badal Sarkar's Pagla Ghoda which is on Hotstar.

His 2025 film Bayaan starring Huma Qureshi was selected in the Discovery section of the 2025 Toronto International Film Festival and will have its World premiere on 7 September 2025.

== Filmography ==
Year	Film	Director	Writer	Notes
2011	Dance of Ganesha	Yes	Yes	
2014	Chauranga	Yes	Yes	
2017	Pagla Ghoda	Yes	Yes	Based on Badal Sircar's classic play
2017	Guy in the Sky	Yes	Yes	
2025	Bayaan	Yes	Yes	Premiered at the TIFF

== Awards ==
- 2011 NFDC Incredible India Award for Chauranga
- 2014 Best Film (India Gold) at 16th Mumbai Film Festival 2014 for Chauranga
- 2015 Grand Jury Prize at Indian Film Festival of Los Angeles
