= Abhijeet Mohan Warang =

Marathi film director

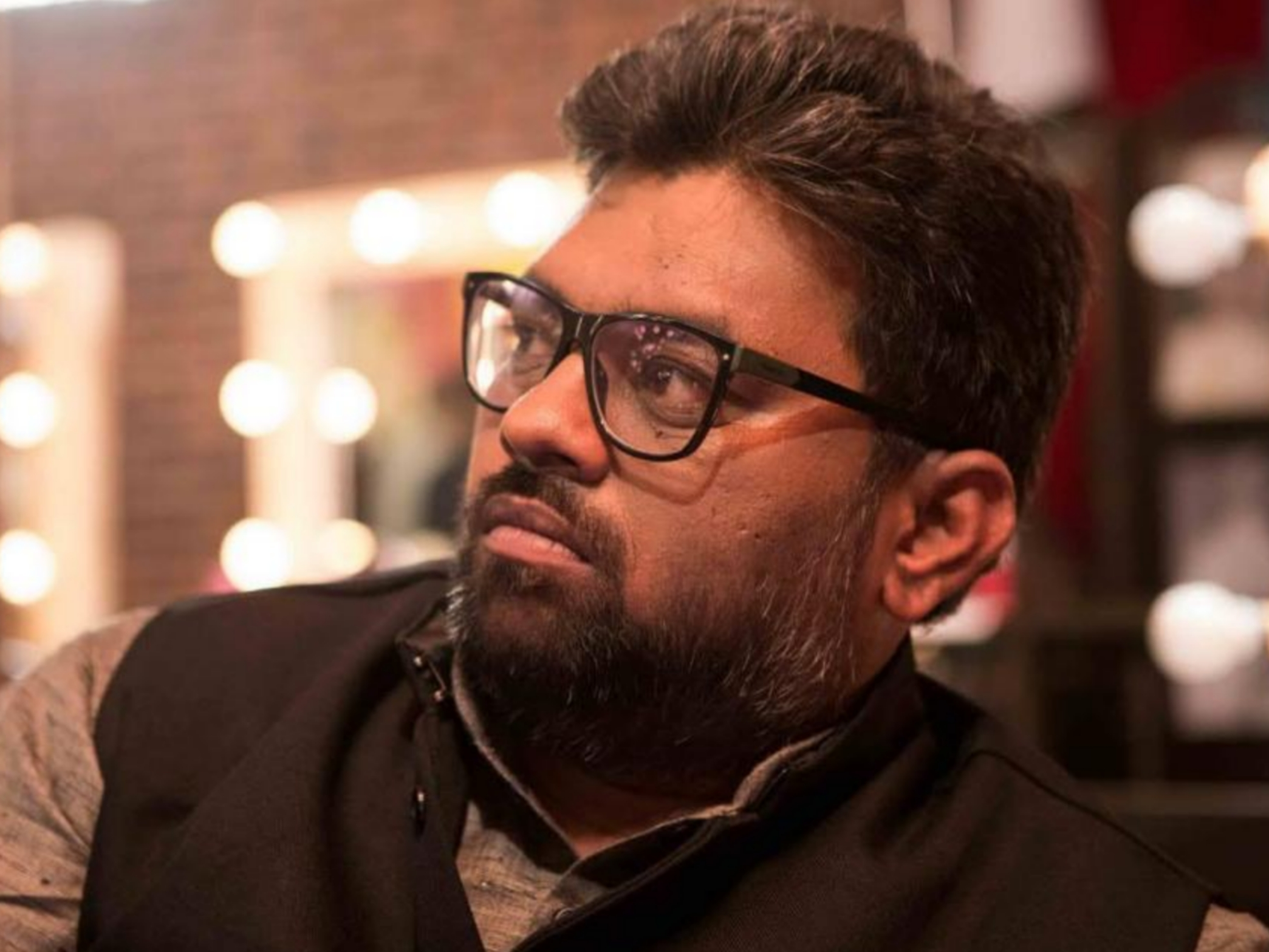
- Born: 16 April 1983 (age 43); Mumbai, Maharashtra, India
- Occupation: Film director
- Spouse: Swara Warang
- Children: 2

Abhijeet Mohan Warang (born 16 April 1983) known professionally as Abhijeet Warang is an Indian film director, actor and screenwriter. He made his directorial debut with the Indian Marathi language drama Picasso in 2021. And won the 2021 67th National Film Awards-National Film Award – Special Mention (feature film).

== Early life and background ==
Abhijeet attended Veermata Jijabai Technological Institute College in Mumbai, Maharashtra. He is married and has two children.

== Career ==
Abhijeet Warang is a theatre writer-director with a four-year assistant director stint at UTV Software & Communication Pvt Ltd and twelve years of experience in film production (including titles like Joshi Ki Kamble (Marathi, 2008), Nirmalya (Marathi, 2010) and 2019 British Feature The Warrior Queen of Jhansi, he has also helmed India TVCs as Line Producer for firms such as Black Box Films Chennai, Thinkpot Films Bangalore, Neonlight Pictures, River Bank, Boot Polissh Films, Tubelight Films, Equinox Films and Melting Clock Films.

== Filmography ==
=== Feature films ===
Year	Film	Language	Director	Producer	Writer	Actor	Notes	Ref.
2021	Picasso	Marathi	Yes	No	Yes	Yes	67th –National Film Award – Special Mention (feature film)	
2022	Deja Vu	Hindi	Yes	No	Yes	No	Best Feature Film in Cult Cinema Film Festival 2022	
2022	Prem Pratha Dhumshan	Marathi	Yes	Yes	Yes	No	Best Marathi Film and Best Director Bharat Independent Cinema Film Festival 2022	
2022	Virtual Reality	Marathi	Yes	Yes	Yes	No	Short film	
2023	Piccolo	Marathi	Yes	No	Yes	No		
2026	Aakhri Sawal	Hindi	Yes	No	No	No		
