= Masumeh Makhija =

Canadian actress (born 1984)

Masumeh
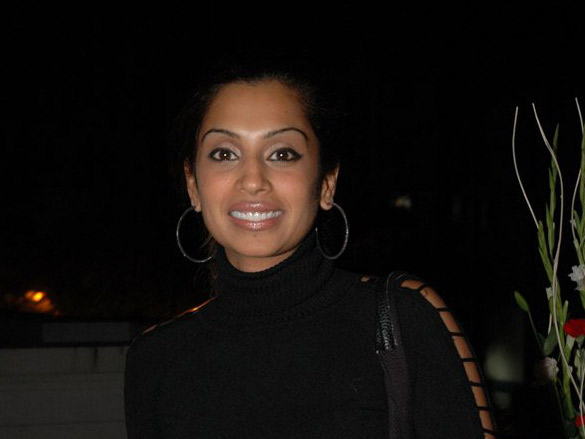
- Born: Masumeh Makhija; 10 October 1984 (age 41); Toronto, Ontario, Canada
- Other name: Masumi
- Occupations: Actress, model
- Years active: 2003–2008, 2018–present
- Relatives: Manish Makhija (uncle)

Masumeh Makhija (born 10 October 1984), known mononymously as Masumeh, is a Canadian actress and model based in India. She was born in Toronto, Ontario, Canada and hails from a well-known Indian film family. Her grandfather Parananand was a pioneering distributor while her uncle Gul Anand and her mother Jayshree are producers known for Chashme Buddoor, Jalwa, Khatta Meetha and Hero Hiralal.

Makhija has appeared in two movies directed by Shona Urvashi, Chupke Se and Saas Bahu Aur Sensex. She started her career as a child artist appearing in commercials and TV shows like Thoda Hai Thoda ki Zaroorat Hai and Banegi Apni Baat. She made her film debut with Chupke Se and has since acted in a number of films, including Vishal Bhardwaj's adaptation of Macbeth entitled Maqbool. She has also appeared in several international productions, including the German movie, Gate to Heaven. In 2018, Makhija starred in 3 Storeys, a Farhan Akhtar production starring Sharman Joshi, Pulkit Samrat, Richa Chadha and Renuka Shahane.

== Filmography ==
=== Films ===
Year	Title	Role	Notes	Ref
2003	Maqbool	Sameera (Abbaji's daughter)	Debut, credited as Masumi Makhija	
2003	Chupke Se	Sarika Verma/Megha Timghire	credited as Masumi	
2003	Gate to Heaven	Nisha	German movie, credited as Masumi Makhija	
2004	The Journey (short)	Girl in the bus		
2005	Padmashree Laloo Prasad Yadav	Padmashree Divakar Kashyap	credited as Masumeh	
2006	Woh Lamhe	Rani Mukherjee	credited as Masumeh	
2007	Heyy Babyy	Special appearance in song		
2007	Dus Kahaniyaan	Kaamna (segment "High on the Highway")		
2008	Saas Bahu Aur Sensex	Kirti Wagaskar	credited as Masumeh	
2008	Sharpe's Peril (TV movie)	(uncredited)		
2018	3 Storeys	Varsha Atre	credited as Masumeh	
2023	Gulaam Chor		Producer only	
2023	Bhagwan Bharose	Radha		
2025	Dil Dosti Aur Dogs	Ekta Sanjay Kamat		

=== Television ===
- Banegi Apni Baat (Zee TV)
- Kya Baat Hai (Star Plus) as Devika a.k.a. Dinky
- Comedy hour (Zee TV)
- Thoda Hai Thode Ki Zaroorat Hai (Sony)
- Suhana Safar (Zee TV)
- Mausam (Zee TV)
- Gubbare (Zee TV)
- Mayajaal (Yes TV)
