= National Film Award – Special Mention (feature film) =

Indian film award

- National award for contributions to Indian Cinema
- Sponsored by: National Film Development Corporation of India
- Formerly called: Special Commendation (1978)
- First award: 1978
- Most recent winner: Dhanush and Suren G. (2024)

The National Film Award – Special Mention is a certificate of merit presented by the National Film Development Corporation of India. It is one of several honours presented for feature films. The recipients of Special Mention are presented with a certificate of merit, without any trophies or cash prizes.

The certificate was instituted in 1978, at 26th National Film Awards and awarded for films produced in a given year across the country, in all Indian languages.

== Winners ==
List of award recipients, showing the year (award ceremony), awarded as, film(s) and language(s)
Year	Recipient(s)	Awarded as	Film(s)	Language(s)	Refs.
1978 (26th)	Mrinal Sen	Director	Parasuram	Bengali	
1978 (26th)	Muzaffar Ali	Director	Gaman	Hindi	
1979 (27th)	No award				
1980 (28th)	No award				
1981 (29th)	No award				
1982 (30th)	No award				
1983 (31st)	Kumar Shahani	Director	Tarang	Hindi	
1984 (32nd)	No award				
1985 (33rd)	No award				
1986 (34th)	Sandip Ray	Director	Himghar	Bengali	
1987 (35th)	No award				
1988 (36th)	Aamir Khan	Actor	• Qayamat Se Qayamat Tak • Raakh	Hindi	
1989 (37th)	Mohanlal	Actor	Kireedam	Malayalam	
1989 (37th)	Anupam Kher	Actor	Daddy	Hindi	
1990 (38th)	Anoubham Kiranmala	Actress	Ishanou	Meitei	
1991 (39th)	Mamata Shankar	Actress	Agantuk	Bengali	
1991 (39th)	Ravindran	Music director	Bharatham	Malayalam	
1992 (40th)	Sibaprasad Sen	Director	Pasanda Pandit	Bengali	
1993 (41st)	• Tahir Hussain • Mahesh Bhatt	• Producer • Director	Hum Hain Rahi Pyar Ke	Hindi	
1993 (41st)	• Jugal Debata • Susant Misra	• Producer • Director	Indradhanura Chhai	Oriya	
1994 (42nd)	Mahesh Mahadevan	Music director	Nammavar	Tamil	
1994 (42nd)	Bishnu Kharghoria	Actor	Xagoroloi Bohudoor	Assamese	
1994 (42nd)	S. Kumar	Cinematographer	Parinayam	Malayalam	
1995 (43rd)	Uttara Baokar	Actress	Doghi	Marathi	
1995 (43rd)	Rohini	Actress	Stri	Telugu	
1995 (43rd)	Benaf Dadachandji	Child actor	Halo	Hindi	
1996 (44th)	Dolon Roy	Actress	Sanghat	Bengali	
1996 (44th)	Bhagirathee	Actress	Adajya	Assamese	
1997 (45th)	Nagarjuna	Actor	Annamayya	Telugu	
1997 (45th)	Jomol	Actress	Ennu Swantham Janakikutty	Malayalam	
1998 (46th)	Dasari Narayana Rao	• Producer • Director	Kante Koothurne Kanu	Telugu	
1998 (46th)	Prakash Raj	Actor	Antahpuram	Telugu	
1998 (46th)	Manju Warrier	Actress	Kannezhuthi Pottum Thottu	Malayalam	
1999 (47th)	Mohan Joshi	Actor	Gharabaher	Marathi	
1999 (47th)	Manju Borah	Director	Baibhab	Assamese	
1999 (47th)	Kavita Lankesh	Director	Deveeri	Kannada	
2000 (48th)	No award				
2001 (49th)	Dilip Doley and Narayan Seal	Director	Panoi-Jongki	Miri and Mishing	
2002 (50th)	Jyothirmayi	Actress	Bhavam	Malayalam	
2003 (51st)	H. G. Dattatreya	Actor	Mouni	Kannada	
2003 (51st)	Nedumudi Venu	Actor	–	Malayalam	
2004 (52nd)	Gurdas Maan	Actor	Des Hoyaa Pardes	Punjabi	
2004 (52nd)	Pradeep Nair	Director	Oridam	Malayalam	
2005 (53rd)	No award				
2006 (54th)	Thilakan	Actor	Eakantham	Malayalam	
2006 (54th)	Prosenjit Chatterjee	Actor	Dosar	Bengali	
2007 (55th)	No award				
2008 (56th)	No award				
2009 (57th)	Padmapriya Janakiraman	Actress	• Kerala Varma Pazhassi Raja • Kutty Srank	Malayalam	
2010 (58th)	K. Shivaram Karanth (posthumously)	Writer	Bettada Jeeva	Kannada	
2011 (59th)	Mallika	Actress	Byari	Beary	
2011 (59th)	Sherrey	Director	Adimadhyantham	Malayalam	
2012 (60th)	Lal	Actor	Ozhimuri	Malayalam	
2012 (60th)	H. G. Dattatreya	Actor	Bharath Stores	Kannada	
2012 (60th)	Bishnu Kharghoria	Actor	Baandhon	Assamese	
2012 (60th)	Parineeti Chopra	Actress	Ishaqzaade	Hindi	
2012 (60th)	Tannishtha Chatterjee	Actress	Dekh Indian Circus	Hindi	
2012 (60th)	Hansraj Jagtap	Child actor	Dhag	Marathi	
2012 (60th)	Thilakan (posthumously)	Actor	Ustad Hotel	Malayalam	
2013 (61st)	Gauri Gadgil	Child actor	Yellow	Marathi	
2013 (61st)	Sanjana Rai	Child actor	Yellow	Marathi	
2013 (61st)	Anjali Patil	Actress	Na Bangaaru Talli	Telugu	
2014 (62nd)	Musthafa	Actor	Ain	Malayalam	
2014 (62nd)	Palomi Ghosh	Actress	Nachom-ia Kumpasar	Konkani	
2014 (62nd)	Parth Bhalerao	Child actor	Killa	Marathi	
2014 (62nd)	Parth Bhalerao	Child actor	Bhoothnath Returns	Hindi	
2015 (63rd)	Rinku Rajguru	Actress	Sairat	Marathi	
2015 (63rd)	Jayasurya	Actor	Su Su Sudhi Vathmeekam	Malayalam	
2015 (63rd)	Jayasurya	Actor	Lukka Chuppi	Malayalam	
2015 (63rd)	Ritika Singh	Actress	Irudhi Suttru	Tamil	
2016 (64th)	Eleeanora Images Private Ltd. and Nila Madhab Panda	Producer and Director	Kadvi Hawa	Hindi	
2016 (64th)	Red Carpet Moving Pictures and Shubhashish Bhutiani	Producer and Director	Mukti Bhawan	Hindi	
2016 (64th)	Adil Hussain	Actor	Mukti Bhawan	Hindi	
2016 (64th)	Adil Hussain	Actor	Maj Rati Keteki	Assamese	
2016 (64th)	Sonam Kapoor	Actress	Neerja	Hindi	
2017 (65th)	Pankaj Tripathi	Actor	Newton	Hindi	
2017 (65th)	Parvathy	Actress	Take Off	Malayalam	
2017 (65th)	Prakruti Mishra	Actress	Hello Arsi	Odia	
2017 (65th)	Yasharaj Karhade	Child artist	Mhorkya	Marathi	
2018 (66th)	Sruthi Hariharan	Actress	Nathicharami	Kannada	
2018 (66th)	Chandrachoor Rai	Actor	Kadakh	Hindi	
2018 (66th)	Joju George	Actor	Joseph	Malayalam	
2018 (66th)	Savithri Sreedharan	Actress	Sudani from Nigeria	Malayalam	
2019 (67th)	Sajin Babu	Director	Biriyaani	Malayalam	
2019 (67th)	Benjamin Daimary	Actor	Jonaki Porua	Assamese	
2019 (67th)	Lata Kare	Actress	Lata Bhagwan Kare	Marathi	
2019 (67th)	Abhijeet Mohan Warang	Director	Picasso	Marathi	
2020 (68th)	Aimee Baruah	Actress	Semkhor	Dimasa	
2020 (68th)	Kavya Prakash	Director	Vaanku	Malayalam	
2020 (68th)	Siddharth Menon	Actor	June	Marathi	
2020 (68th)	Kishor Kadam	Actor	Godakaath	Marathi	
2020 (68th)	Kishor Kadam	Actor	Avwanchhit	Marathi	
2020 (68th)	Varun Buddhadev	Child Actor	Toolsidas Junior	Hindi	
2021 (69th)	Nallandi	Actor	Kadaisi Vivasayi	Tamil	
2021 (69th)	Aranya and Bithan	Actors	Jhilli	Bengali	
2021 (69th)	Indrans	Actor	Home	Malayalam	
2021 (69th)	Jahanara Begum	Actress	Anur	Assamese	
2022 (70th)	Manoj Bajpayee	Actor	Gulmohar	Hindi	
2022 (70th)	Sanjoy Chowdhury	Music composer	Kadhikan	Malayalam	
2023 (71st)	M. R. Rajakrishnan	Sound designer	Animal	Hindi	
2024 (72nd)	Dhanush	Actor	Captain Miller	Tamil	
2024 (72nd)	Suren G.	Sound Mix Engineer	Meiyazhagan	Tamil	

== See also ==
- National Film Award – Special Jury Award
