= Sanjoy Nag =

Indian actor and film director

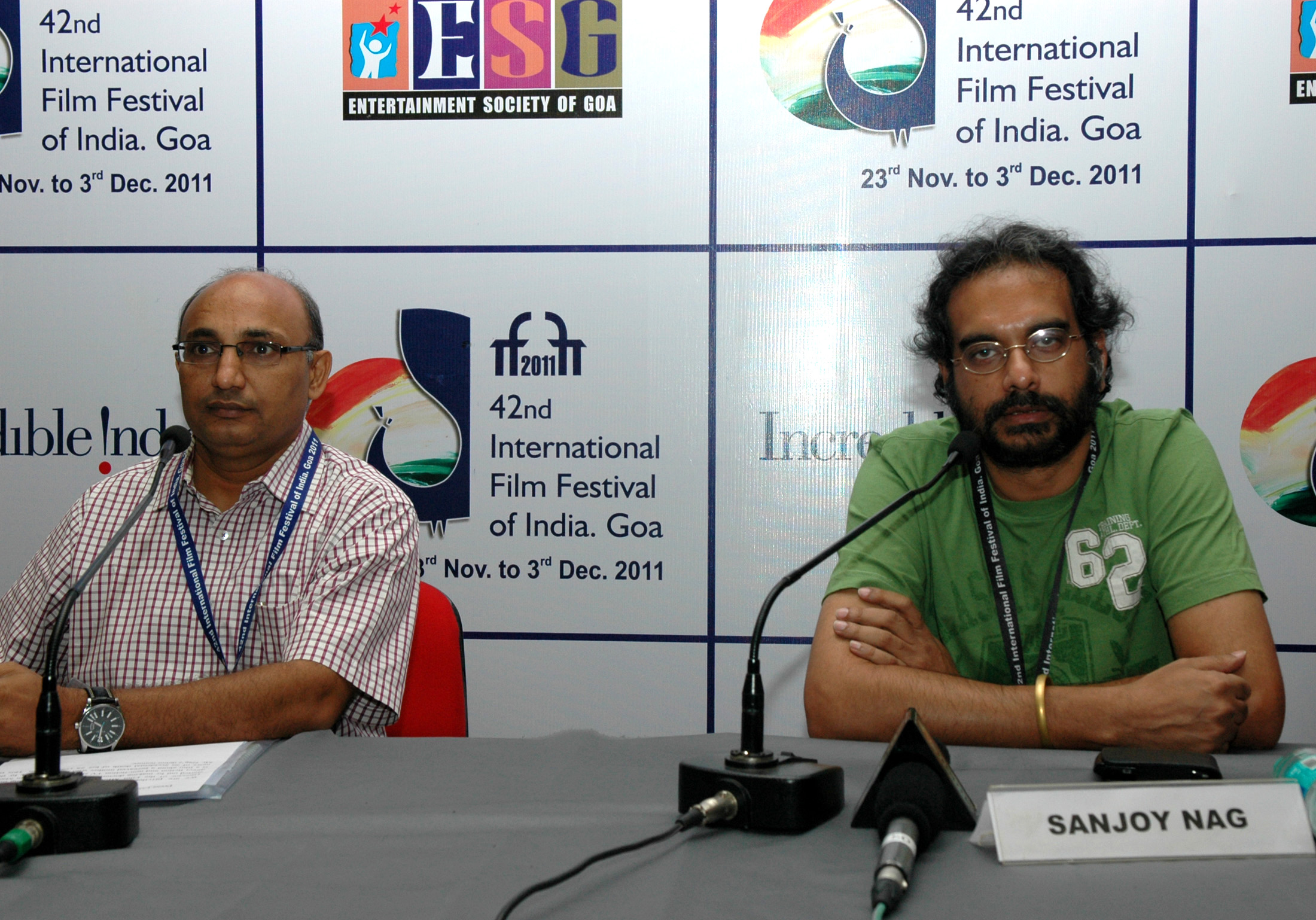
- Sanjoy Nag, IFFI (2011)
- Other name: Bunty
- Occupation: Film director
- Years active: 1992–present
- Notable work: Memories In March, Parapaar, Yours Truly, Good Morning Sunshine
- Awards: National Film Award, (2010) ( as Director )

Sanjoy Nag (born 18 March) is a film director/actor. He won the National Film Award in 2011 for his debut feature film Memories in March.

== Early life and background ==
Sanjoy Nag was born and brought up in Kolkata. He completed his schooling from St James’ School. He pursued commerce from University of Calcutta. He was associated with the film and television industry of Bengal from a young age.

== Career ==
He conceptualized the album Priyo Bondhu with Anjan Dutt and Nima Rahman. In 2011, he made his debut feature film Memories in March that won him the National Film Award for Best Feature Film in English. He acted in Rituparno Ghosh’s film on Rabindranath Tagore. He was associate director for Rituporno Ghosh's award winning film Chitrangada and Anjan Dutt's film Badadin

== Filmography as director ==
Year	Movie	Language	Producer	Cast	Release
2010	Memories in March	English	Shree Venkatesh Films	Rituparno Ghosh, Deepti Naval and Raima Sen	1 April 2011
2014	Parapaar	Bengali	Purti Entertainment	Rituparna Sengupta, Paoli Dam, Ahmed Rubel and Bratya Basu	14 November 2014
2018	Yours Truly	Hindi	Basabaari Talkies, Platoon One Films, MDC Filmworks, Lighthouse Innoventures,	Soni Razdan, Pankaj Tripathi, Aahana Kumra, Mahesh Bhatt	
2018	Good Morning, Sunshine	English-Hindi	ACP Entertainment, Basabaari Talkies	Revathi, Rituparna Sengupta, Tejaswini Kolhapure, Shabana Azmi and Shweta Tripathi	Filming

== Filmography as actor ==
Year	Movie	Language	Director	Character/Role
2012	Chitrangada	Bengali	Rituparno Ghosh	Rohan - Still Photographer
2013	Jeevan Smriti: Selective Memories	English	Rituparno Ghosh	Rabindranath Tagore
2013	Satyanweshi	Bengali	Rituparno Ghosh	Diwan Chandrasekhar
2015	Kadambari	Bengali	Suman Ghosh	Debendranath Tagore
2017	Macher Jhol	Bengali	Pratim DGupta	Doctor
2017	Meghnad Badh Rahasya	Bengali	Anik Dutta	
2026	Emperor Vs Sarat Chandra	Bengali	Srijit Mukherji	Rabindranath Tagore
