= Hot Docs Audience Awards =

Canadian film awards

The Hot Docs Audience Awards are annual film awards, presented by the Hot Docs Canadian International Documentary Festival to the most popular films as voted by festival audiences. There are currently two awards presented for feature films: the Hot Docs Audience Award, presented since 2001 to the most popular film overall regardless of nationality, and the Rogers Audience Award, presented since 2017 to the most popular Canadian film.

Audience awards are also presented for mid-length and short films; however, these do not separate Canadian and international films.

The Rogers Audience Award comes with a CA$50,000 prize from the Rogers Group of Funds, and is considered the most important award at the festival. Although the festival releases a preview list of the Top 20 contenders in audience award voting while the festival is underway, the Canadian films in the list are hidden, and identified only as a film that is eligible for the Rogers Award rather than by title, so as not to give away the Rogers Award contenders in advance of the final announcement. The festival concludes with a repeat screening of the Rogers Audience Award winner, following which the preview list is updated to reveal all of the hidden Canadian film titles.

If a Canadian film wins the overall award, then the Canadian award is not given to a different film in lieu, but instead the same film wins both awards. This practice was diverged from for the first time at the 2023 festival, where Philippe Falardeau's documentary television series Lac-Mégantic: This Is Not an Accident was the overall winner of the Audience Award; although a Canadian project, it comprised episodes of a television series rather than a feature film, and thus was not deemed eligible for the Rogers Award, which instead went to the film Someone Lives Here.

Due to the COVID-19 pandemic in Canada, in both 2020 and 2021 the festival opted to split the Canadian award and its associated prize money among all of the five highest-ranked Canadian films of the year instead of singling out only the top-ranked Canadian film. In 2022, the festival split the Canadian award among three films instead of five, and returned to naming a single winner in 2023.

== Hot Docs Audience Award ==
Year	Film	Director(s)	Ref
2001	Southern Comfort	Kate Davis	
2002	The Last Just Man	Steven Silver	
2003	War Babies	Raymonde Provencher	
2004	Death in Gaza	James Miller	
2005	Street Fight	Marshall Curry	
2006	A Lion in the House	Steven Bognar, Julia Reichert	
2007	War/Dance	Sean Fine, Andrea Nix Fine	
2008	Taking Root: The Vision of Wangari Maathai	Lisa Merton, Alan Dater	
2009	The Cove	Louie Psihoyos	
2010	Thunder Soul	Mark Landsman	
2011	Somewhere Between	Linda Goldstein Knowlton	
2012	Chasing Ice	Jeff Orlowski	
2013	Muscle Shoals	Greg "Freddy" Camalier	
2014	The Backward Class	Madeleine Grant	
2015	Unbranded	Phillip Baribeau	
2016	Angry Inuk	Alethea Arnaquq-Baril	
2017	Rumble: The Indians Who Rocked the World	Catherine Bainbridge, Alfonso Maiorana	
2018	Transformer	Michael Del Monte	
2019	Maxima	Claudia Sparrow	
2020	The Walrus and the Whistleblower	Nathalie Bibeau	
2021	Dear Future Children	Franz Böhm	
2022	Eternal Spring	Jason Loftus	
2023	Lac-Mégantic: This Is Not an Accident	Philippe Falardeau	
2024	Yintah	Jennifer Wickham, Brenda Michell, Michael Toledano	
2025	Come See Me in the Good Light	Ryan White	
2026	American Doctor	Poh Si Teng	

== Rogers Audience Award ==
From 2020 through 2022, due to the COVID-19 pandemic the festival split the Rogers Audience Award and its associated prize money among all of the top five (2020, 2021) or three (2022) films instead of naming only the top film as in other years. For those years, the film that was the overall top Canadian film in audience voting is denoted in the table below with a †.

Year	Film	Director(s)	Ref
2017	Rumble: The Indians Who Rocked the World	Catherine Bainbridge, Alfonso Maiorana	
2018	Transformer	Michael Del Monte	
2019	Prey	Matt Gallagher	
2020	9/11 Kids	Elizabeth St. Philip	
2020	First We Eat	Suzanne Crocker	
2020	The Forbidden Reel	Ariel Nasr	
2020	There's No Place Like This Place, Anyplace	Lulu Wei	
2020	The Walrus and the Whistleblower †	Nathalie Bibeau	
2021	Fanny: The Right to Rock †	Bobbi Jo Hart	
2021	Hell or Clean Water	Cody Westman	
2021	Kímmapiiyipitssini: The Meaning of Empathy	Elle-Máijá Tailfeathers	
2021	Someone Like Me	Steve J. Adams, Sean Horlor	
2021	Still Max	Katherine Knight	
2022	Eternal Spring †	Jason Loftus	
2022	Okay!: The ASD Band Film	Mark Bone	
2022	Unloved: Huronia's Forgotten Children	Barri Cohen	
2023	Someone Lives Here	Zack Russell	
2024	Yintah	Jennifer Wickham, Brenda Michell, Michael Toledano	
2025	Endless Cookie	Seth Scriver, Peter Scriver	
2026	Nekai Walks	Rico King	

== Audience Award for Mid-Length Films ==
Year	Film	Director(s)	Ref
2019	Beloved	Yasir Talebi	
2020	Keyboard Fantasies: The Beverly Glenn-Copeland Story	Posy Dixon	
2021	Spirit to Soar	Tanya Talaga, Michelle Derosier	
2022	Sexual Healing	Elsbeth Fraanje	
2023	When Spring Came to Bucha	Mila Teshaieva, Marcus Lenz	
2024	Fire Tower	Tova Krentzman	
2025	Aisha's Story	Elizabeth Vibert, Chen Wang	
2026	Award not presented		

== Audience Award for Short Films ==
Year	Film	Director(s)	Ref
2019	St. Louis Superman	Sami Khan, Smriti Mundhra	
2020	Nancy's Workshop	Aïcha Diop	
2021	A Concerto Is a Conversation	Ben Proudfoot, Kris Bowers	
2022	Dad Can Dance	Jamie Ross	
2023	Eco-Hack!	Joshua Izenberg, Brett Marty	
2024	Nothing Special	Efrat Berger	
2025	La Mayordomía	Martin Edralin	
2026	Sanyi the Rooster	Lotte Salomons	

== See also ==
- Toronto International Film Festival People's Choice Award: Documentaries
