= Millennium Docs Against Gravity =

Polish documentary film festival

Festival's logo in 2023.

The Millennium Docs Against Gravity (originally Warsaw Doc Review, then Planete Doc Review) is an annual documentary film festival in Poland held since 2004, usually in May.

== Grand Prix ==
The main award at the festival is the Grand Prix Bank Millennium Award, sponsored by the Bank Millennium.

Grand Prix Bank Millennium Award recipients
Year	Festival	Film	Director(s)	Country of production	Year of production	Ref.
Grand Prix introduced.
2006	3rd	Dreaming by Numbers	Anna Bucchetti	Netherlands; Italy	2005/2006	
2007	4th	The Monastery: Mr. Vig and the Nun	Pernille Rose Grønkjær	Denmark	2006	
2008	5th	Up the Yangtze	Yung Chang	Canada	2007	
2009	6th	The Sound of Insects	Peter Liechti	Switzerland	2009	
2010	7th	Steam of Life	Joonas Berghäll, Mika Hotakainen	Finland	2010	
2011	8th	Abendland	Nikolaus Geyrhalter	Austria	2010	
2012	9th	5 Broken Cameras	Emad Burnat, Guy Davidi	Palestine; Israel; France; Netherlands	2011	
2013	10th	Forget Me Not	David Sieveking	Germany	2013	
2014	11th	We Come as Friends	Hubert Sauper	Austria; France	2014	
2015	12th	Something Better to Come	Hanna Polak	Denmark	2014	
2015	12th	Above And Below	Nicolas Steiner	Switzerland; Germany	2015	
2016	13th	Under the Sun	Witalij Manski	Russia; Germany; Czech Republic; Latvia; North Korea	2015	
2017	14th	Last Men in Aleppo	Feras Fayyad	Denmark	2017	
2018	15th	Minding the Gap	Bing Liu	United States	2018	
2019	16th	Honeyland	Ljubomir Stefanov, Tamara Kotevska	North Macedonia	2018	
2020	17th	The Earth Is Blue as an Orange	Iryna Tsilyk	Ukraine; Lithuania	2020	
2021	18th	Flee	Jonas Poher Rasmussen	Denmark; France; Sweden	2021	
2022	19th	The Pawnshop	Łukasz Kowalski	Poland	2022	
2023	20th	Apolonia, Apolonia	Lea Glob	Denmark; Poland; France	2022	
2024	21st	No Other Land	Basel Adra, Hamdan Ballal, Yuval Abraham, Rachel Szor	Palestine; Norway	2024	
2025	22nd	Yintah	Jennifer Wickham, Brenda Michell, Michael Toledano	Canada	2024	
2026	23rd	To Hold A Mountain	Biljana Tutorov, Petar Glomazić	Serbia; France; Montenegro; Slovenia; Croatia	2026	
