= Coastal GasLink pipeline =

Natural gas pipeline in Canada

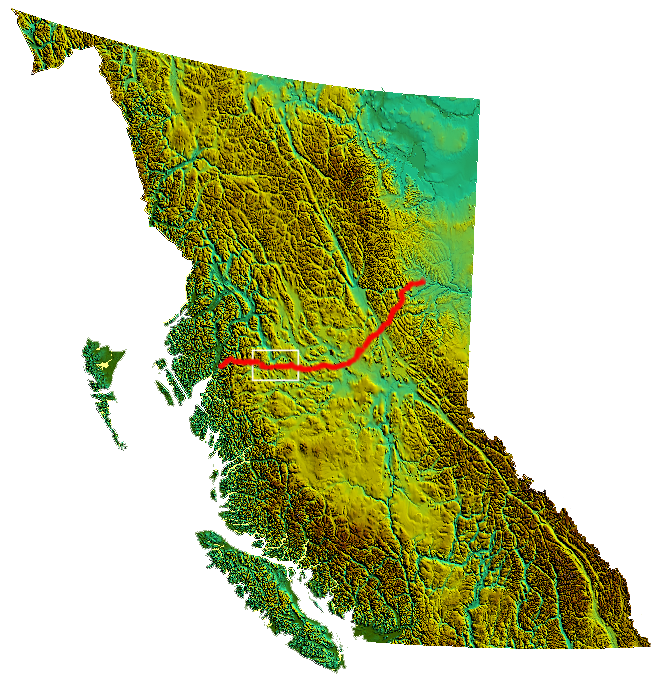
- Coastal GasLink route. Wetʼsuwetʼen territory is in the white square

Location
- Country: Canada
- Province: British Columbia
- Start: Dawson Creek, British Columbia
- To: Kitimat, British Columbia

General information
- Type: Natural gas
- Owner: TC Energy
- Partners: LNG Canada, Korea Gas Corporation, Mitsubishi, PetroChina, Petronas
- Construction started: 2019
- Commissioned: 2024

Technical information
- Length: 670 km (420 mi)
- Maximum discharge: 2.1 billion cubic feet per day
- Diameter: 1,219 mm (48 in)

The Coastal GasLink pipeline is a TC Energy natural gas pipeline in British Columbia, Canada. The pipeline entered commercial in-service in November 2024. Starting in Dawson Creek, the pipeline's route crosses through the Canadian Rockies and other mountain ranges to Kitimat, where the gas will be exported to Asian customers. Its route passes through several First Nations peoples' traditional lands, including some that are unceded. Controversy around the project has highlighted divisions within the leadership structure of impacted First Nations: elected band councils support the project, but traditional hereditary chiefs of the Wetʼsuwetʼen people oppose the project on ecological grounds and organized blockades to obstruct construction on their traditional land. Wetʼsuwetʼen people opposed to the pipeline argue that they have a relationship with the land that the Coastal GasLink pipeline construction threatens.

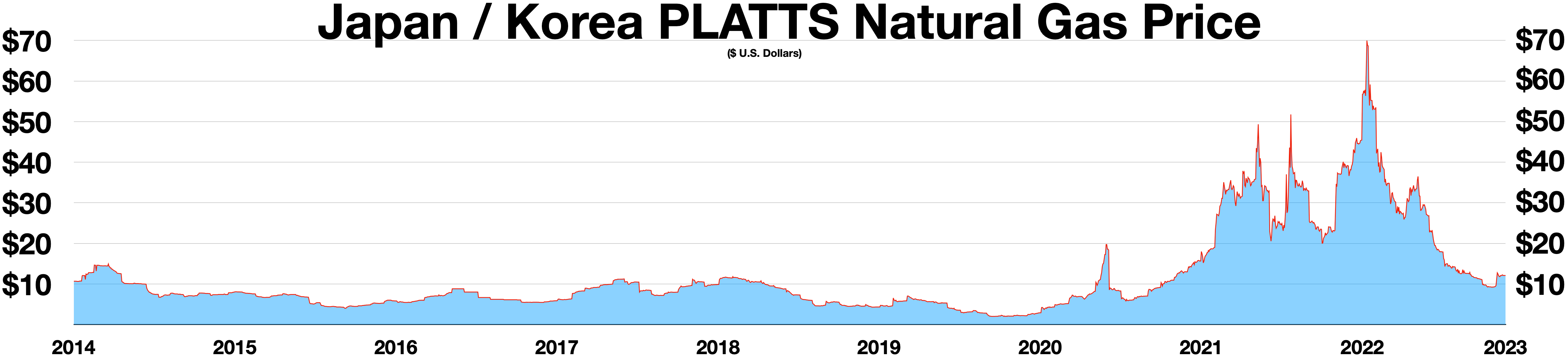
Japan / Korea PLATTS LNG price

A court injunction against protesters blocking the project in an effort to defend their unceded land was granted twice by the BC Supreme Court, in 2018 and 2019. In 2019 and 2020, the Royal Canadian Mounted Police (RCMP) entered the blocked area and cleared road access for construction using the threat of lethal force, arresting several of the protesters. The 2020 arrests sparked widespread protests across Canada in solidarity with the original protests. Protests targeted government offices, ports and rail lines. A protest in February 2020 by the Mohawk First Nation people of Tyendinaga in Ontario blocked a critical segment of rail, causing Via Rail to shut down much of its passenger rail network and Canadian National Railway (CNR) to shut down freight service in eastern Canada for several weeks.

Coastal GasLink (CGL) resumed construction after the RCMP cleared Wetʼsuwetʼen from the access road; however, the pipeline project is still opposed by the Wetʼsuwetʼen hereditary chiefs. The Wetʼsuwetʼen asked CGL to halt construction due to the COVID-19 pandemic, over concerns about spreading the disease. Construction has largely continued, though several stop-work orders were issued by the provincial government in June 2020 following an environmental assessment. The Wetʼsuwetʼen also had concerns about the threats of violence that Indigenous women, girls, and two-spirit people face resulting from man camps along the pipeline construction path. The Wetʼsuwetʼen filed for judicial review on the CGL's request for a pipeline environmental permit extension on the grounds that CGL had over 50 non-compliance orders and due to the findings of Canada's National Inquiry on Missing and Murdered Indigenous Women.

When CGL attempted to drill under the Morice River, further conflict erupted as Wet'suwet'en defenders erected blockades and destroyed construction equipment. These blockades were removed in November 2021. By September 2022, CGL had equipment in place to drill under the river; the company said they had completed eight of ten river crossings required for the project and were nearing 70% completion at that time. In May 2023, CGL completed all ten river crossings, including micro-tunnelling under the Morice River south of Houston.

In March 2022, CGL signed agreements with 20 elected First Nation band councils supporting the project, including 17 signing on to purchase equity in the project. However, Wet'suwet'en hereditary chiefs state that the band councils are political entities created by the federal government, and thus do not have authority over land beyond reserve boundaries.

== Project description ==
The pipeline's route starts near Dawson Creek and runs approximately 670 kilometres (420 mi) south-west to a liquefaction plant near Kitimat. The route passes through the traditional territories of several Indigenous peoples, including the Wet'suwet'en. The natural gas transported by the pipeline will be converted into liquefied natural gas by the LNG Canada plant in Kitimat and then exported to global markets. In particular, the company expects the primary market for the natural gas will be Asian nations planning to convert from coal-fired power plants.

The initial estimated cost to construct the pipeline was CA$6.6 billion. The project is owned and will be operated by TC Energy. LNG Canada selected TC Energy to design, build, and own the pipeline in 2012. In December 2019, investment management firm AIMCo and private equity firm KKR entered into an agreement to buy a 65% equity interest in the project for an estimated CA$600 million. The deal was closed May 25, 2020, and by August 2020, construction of the pipeline was underway. By the end of July 2022, approximately 70% of the pipeline had been completed, and the cost of the project had increased to CA$11.2 billion.

In October 2023, pipeline installation on the project was 100% complete.

== Controversy ==
The project is opposed by the hereditary chiefs of the Wetʼsuwetʼen, some other First Nations, and environmental activists.

Hereditary chiefs claim jurisdiction over and responsibility to protect traditional Wetʼsuwetʼen territory. They said in 2020 that the jurisdiction of elected band councils, established under the Indian Act, is limited to their reserves.

The Wetʼsuwetʼen people were traditionally governed only by hereditary chiefs. However, the Indian Act created another form of governance: the elected band councils. Environmental scholar Avital Meira van Meijeren Karp said that “the Wet’suwet’en First Nation has the elected chief and council which is the colonial governance system that approved the CGL pipeline, a key distinction in this case”. Though the elected band councils agreed to the CGL pipeline construction, the hereditary chiefs opposed the project. The hereditary chiefs said that Wet'suwet'en territory was never ceded to the federal government and that not all Wet'suwet'en people are governed by the decisions made by the elected chiefs and councils created under the Indian Act.

The hereditary chiefs said that 22,000 square kilometres (8,500 mi^{2}) of Wetʼsuwetʼen territory was never ceded to the Government of Canada. When this took place, British Columbia was still a colony, and it did not enter into treaties with the Wetʼsuwetʼen people before joining Canada. Therefore, the chiefs claim that aboriginal title over the Wetʼsuwetʼen peoples' traditional land has not been extinguished. The Supreme Court of Canada affirmed hereditary chiefs' land claims in the 1997 Delgamuukw v British Columbia decision, which affirmed Aboriginal title rights and recognized that the Wet'suwet'en have a system of laws that predates colonialism.

Hereditary chief Freda Huson, an organizer of the Unist'ot'en Camp, a protest camp and indigenous healing centre in northern BC, said in 2019 that "Without our land, we aren't who we are. The land is us and we are the land," and also that the energy industry wanted to, "take, take, take. And they aren't taking no for an answer."

Some Wet’suwet’en people have taken a stance against the CGL pipeline project due to environmental and cultural concerns. The Wet’suwet’en rely on their land for food, water, and to support their way of life and relationship with the land. Huson said, “Our people’s belief is that we are part of the land. The land is not separate from us. The land sustains us. And if we don’t take care of her, she won’t be able to sustain us, and we as a generation of people will die”. The CGL pipeline's potential for creating problems around water use, chemical leakages, greenhouse gas emissions, and other impacts on climate change and public health are concerns for the Unist’ot’en Camp. Further, Indigenous groups are increasingly more vulnerable to climate change and are disproportionately affected by its impacts.

Spokesperson for the hereditary chiefs, Chief Na'Moks, said, “We need them [CGL] to understand that what they are doing is destroying our lands, our ecological sites, our burial sites…They have no comprehension of how important it is to our people". According to environmental and Indigenous Studies scholar Kerstin Reibold, many Wet’suwet’en hereditary chiefs opposed the CGL pipeline project construction as it destroyed traditional Wet’suwet’en cultural sites that were vital to the cultural longevity of their communities.

Others oppose the pipeline on environmental grounds. The CGL project is expected to increase British Columbia's carbon footprint by 8 to 9 megatons. This number is predicted to stop the province from achieving their climate goals. "When burned, this natural gas (transported through the completed pipeline) is equivalent 585.5 million pounds of CO_{2} a day...13 percent of Canada's daily greenhouse gas emissions in 2017." In 2018, environmental activist Michael Sawyer challenged the approval of the pipeline, filing a formal application to require the federal National Energy Board to do a full review. The NEB ruled that the project fell under the jurisdiction of British Columbia, and its British Columbia Oil and Gas Commission. The pipeline also may have an impact on Wetʼsuwetʼen waterways. Sleydo' Molly Wickham, a Gidimt'en clan chief said in 2021, "You could swim in that lake and just open your mouth and drink the water, it's so pristine, and the river is so clear that you can see these very deep spawning beds that the salmon have been returning to for thousands of years." Outside the pipeline itself, construction activities near and around waterways like blasting and riprap armouring could harm the fish population.

According to the Canadian Broadcasting Corporation (CBC), the CGL pipeline project also affects human and non-human lives. The project had been issued over 50 warnings of repeated non-compliance violations and was flagged for multiple infractions on environmental regulation. British Columbia's Environmental Assessment Office (BCEAO) found that the CGL pipeline project was responsible for the release of pollution into Fraser Lake. The BCEAO said that a release of water towards Fraser Lake created a plume of sediment in the water that could be seen from the air. Fraser Lake is home to 1,000 people and is a critical habitat for endangered white sturgeon and trumpeter swans. Coastal GasLink's 670-kilometre pipeline crossed 625 fish-bearing streams, creeks, rivers and lakes. The CGL pipeline project has been issued warnings due to its failure to protect sensitive waterway and wetlands from sediment erosion. This erosion harms fish habitats, water quality, and people who depend on these waterways for survival. According to CBC journalist Betsy Trumpener, the Coastal GasLink pipelines repeated non-compliance offences are a violation of the project's environmental assessment certificate.

Some indigenous organizations support the pipeline. The First Nations Liquefied Natural Gas Alliance objected to BC and UN human rights officials who called for a stop to pipeline construction, saying that these officials did not consult indigenous groups supportive of the pipeline before issuing their statements. The First Nations LNG alliance pointed to opportunities for indigenous contracting and "extensive" consultation with indigenous people. Crystal Smith, chief counsellor of the Haisla Nation, which had signed an agreement to allow the pipeline to pass through its traditional land, said in 2020 that "First Nations have been left out of resource development for too long...But we are involved, we have been consulted and we will ensure there are benefits for all First Nations." Victor Jim, an elected chief of the Wetʼsuwetʼen, also signed off on the benefits deal. On February 19, 2020, 200 members of the Wetʼsuwetʼen community attended a meeting in Houston organized by the pro-pipeline North Matters group. Robert Skin, a councillor with the Skin Tyee First Nation, said the project "will look after our children and our children's children." He was critical of the protesters: "They want to stand up with their fists in the air, but I say come and listen to us and get the other side of the story before you go out there and stop traffic and stop the railroad." According to Paul Manly, Green Member of Parliament for Nanaimo—Ladysmith, the elected councils had not "consented" but merely "conceded", to the project, seen as inevitable.

The project and the protests exposed divisions within the Wetʼsuwetʼen and Mohawk First Nations. The hereditary chiefs of the Wetʼsuwetʼen opposed the project, while the elected band councils supported it, leading to a call for "a cohesive voice". The railway blockade by the Tyendinaga Mohawks in February 2020 was not organized by the band leadership, while the Haudenosaunee Confederacy external relations committee issued a statement condemning the "RCMP invasion". The hereditary chiefs travelled to the various Mohawk communities to give thanks for their support but met with a third organization, the Mohawk Nation, a separate form of government comprising the various Mohawk communities in Canada and the United States. Grand Chief Serge Otsi Simon of the Kanesatake Mohawk First Nation called on protesters to end the railway blockades as a show of good faith. "Bringing down the blockades doesn't mean that you surrender. It doesn't mean we're going to lay down and let them kick us around. No, it would show compassion. I'm simply pleading with the protesters ... Have you made your point yet? Has the government and industry understood? I think they did." The next day, Simon disavowed his comments after reserve residents barred him from the band council office. Columnist John Ivison suggested that the situation highlighted a need to move on a legislative framework for restructuring authority between the elected councils mandated by the Indian Act and traditional hereditary governments.

== Project history ==
=== Consultations ===
Consultation with local band councils was held as part of the planning and environmental review process between 2012 and 2014. As a result of the 1997 Delgamuukw v British Columbia court case of the Gitxsan and Wetʼsuwetʼen peoples, comprehensive consultations with hereditary chiefs are also required for major projects in traditional lands. During consultations, the Office of the Wetʼsuwetʼen proposed alternative routes for the pipeline through areas that had already been disturbed by other infrastructure projects. These routes were rejected by Coastal GasLink on August 21, 2014, in a letter that stated that the routes were unsuitable for a pipeline of the proposed diameter, closer to urban communities, and would extend development time by requiring consultation with four additional First Nations. On January 27, Coastal GasLink president David Pfeiffer stated that the current route was the most technically viable and minimized impact to the environment. On February 14, 2020, Coastal GasLink released a 2014 letter in which Coastal GasLink proposed an alternate route called the Morice River North Alternate that would have moved the project three to five kilometres north of the present route, but it went unanswered by the office of the Wetʼsuwetʼen hereditary chiefs. According to Coastal GasLink, the company held over 120 meetings with the hereditary chiefs between 2012 and 2019 and over 1,300 phone calls and emails, but they have nonetheless been unable to agree on a route for the pipeline.

=== Approval process ===
Approval was given by twenty elected First Nation band councils (including the Wetʼsuwetʼen elected band council) along the proposed route and the Government of British Columbia.

As a part of their agreement, TC Energy announced it will be awarding CA$620 million in contract work to northern B.C. First Nations.

The BC Environmental Assessment Office approved the pipeline project in 2014. The project submitted an application for permits to construct the pipeline to the BC Oil and Gas Commission (BCOGC) in 2014 and was granted all necessary permits by the BCOGC between 2015 and 2016.

=== Protests ===
Protests began with the Wetʼsuwetʼen hereditary chiefs that oppose the project (including eight out of nine sitting house chiefs) and other land defenders blocking access to the pipeline construction camps in Wetʼsuwetʼen territory. Land defenders are usually Indigenous people opposing large-scale resource extraction projects and the people who support their cause. This can include lawyers, journalists, protesters. Public policy and global affairs expert Philippe Le Billon stated that “Environmental and land defenders play a crucial role in attempts to slow down environmental change and address power inequalities in land-use and resource development”.

On January 7, 2019, the RCMP conducted a raid and dismantled the blockades after CGL was granted an injunction by the BC Supreme Court, arresting several Wetʼsuwetʼen land defenders. On January 10, the Wetʼsuwetʼen and RCMP came to an agreement to allow access. The blockades were subsequently rebuilt. After the RCMP again removed the Wetʼsuwetʼen blockades and arrested Wetʼsuwetʼen land defenders in February 2020, solidarity protests sprang up across Canada. Many were rail blockades, including the blocking of the main CN line through eastern Ontario. Passenger rail and freight rail movements were blocked for several weeks, leading to rationing of goods, other goods backlogged and several major ports being shut down.

During the COVID-19 pandemic pipeline construction was considered essential work. Wetʼsuwetʼen communities were concerned with the increasing numbers of people travelling to their territories and the threat of disease. Indigenous communities across northern British Columbia repeatedly called for construction camps to be closed due to the pandemic.

Wetʼsuwetʼen protesters blocked the Morice Forest Service Road that provides access to construction of the pipeline project. The first injunction was issued by the B.C. Supreme Court in December 2018. The RCMP set up a temporary office on the Morice Forest Service Road to enforce the injunction. This injunction was extended by the B.C. Supreme Court on December 31, 2019. The extension included an order authorizing the RCMP to enforce the injunction. The hereditary chiefs ordered the eviction of the RCMP and Coastal GasLink personnel.

The RCMP announced January 30, 2020, that they would stand down while the hereditary chiefs and the province met to try to come to an agreement. However, all parties issued statements on February 4 that the talks had broken down. On February 3, the Office of the Wetʼsuwetʼen asked for a judicial review of the environmental approval for the pipeline.

On February 6, the RCMP began enforcing the injunction, arresting 21 protesters at camps along the route between February 6 and 9. The largest of those camps is Unistʼotʼen Camp, directly in the proposed path of the pipeline, established in 2010 as a checkpoint, which has since added a healing centre. The arrests included protest organizers Karla Tait, Freda Huson and Brenda Michell. All were released within two days. The RCMP also detained several reporters and interfered with the freedom of the press. Two journalists, Amber Bracken and Michael Toledano, were arrested and detained by the RCMP at a pipeline protest. Their arrests sparked an outrage from advocates of press freedom in Canada and the United States. Toledano said that, “Canadians should know that journalists in this country can be arrested and incarcerated if they're telling a story the RCMP don't like”.

Union of British Columbia Indian Chiefs Grand Chief Stewart Phillip stated that "we are in absolute outrage and a state of painful anguish as we witness the Wetʼsuwetʼen people having their title and rights brutally trampled on and their right to self-determination denied."

On February 11, the RCMP announced that the road to the construction site was cleared and TC Energy announced that work would resume the following Monday. On February 21, the British Columbia Environmental Assessment Office (EAO) served notice that Coastal GasLink must halt construction on a segment of the route blocked by hereditary chiefs and enter into talks with the Wetʼsuwetʼen over the following 30 days. After the hereditary chiefs made it a condition for talks with government, the RCMP closed their local office and moved to their detachment in Houston on February 22.

Protests sprang up across Canada in solidarity with the Wetʼsuwetʼen hereditary chiefs. On February 11, protesters surrounded the BC Parliament Buildings in Victoria, preventing traditional ceremonies around the reading of the throne speech by the lieutenant governor. Members of the legislature had to have police assistance to enter or used back or side entrances. Protesters assembled outside government offices in Victoria on February 14, and a representative of the BC government employees' union advised its members to treat the protest as a picket line. Other protests took place in Nelson, Calgary, Regina, Winnipeg, Toronto, Ottawa, Sherbrooke, and Halifax.

Other First Nations, activists, land defenders and other supporters of the Wetʼsuwetʼen hereditary chiefs targeted railway lines. Near Belleville, Ontario, members of the Mohawks of the Bay of Quinte First Nation began a blockade of the Canadian National Railway rail line just north of Tyendinaga Mohawk Territory on February 6, causing Via Rail to cancel trains on their Toronto–Montreal and Toronto-Ottawa routes. The line is critical to the CN network in eastern Canada as CN has no other east–west rail lines through eastern Ontario.

Other protests blocking rail lines halted service on Via Rail's Prince Rupert and Prince George lines, running on CN tracks. Protests on the CN line west of Winnipeg additionally blocked the only trans-Canada passenger rail route. Protests disrupted GO train lines in the Greater Toronto Area (GTA) and Exo's Candiac line in Montreal. Canadian Pacific Railway (CPR) rail lines were also disrupted in downtown Toronto and south of Montreal. The Société de chemin de fer de la Gaspésie (SCFG) freight railway between Gaspé and Matapédia was blockaded on February 10 by members of the Listuguj Miꞌgmaq First Nation. The nationwide blockades led to Via Rail and CNR shutting down most of their service across the country for most of February, with regular service resuming by early March.

Eventually, talks with government led to a memorandum of understanding (MOU) over land rights and title between the Canadian government, the BC government, and the nine sitting house chiefs of the Wetʼsuwetʼen. The MOU commits Canada and British Columbia to recognize that rights and title are held by house groups within the Wetʼsuwetʼen Nation, under the Wetʼsuwetʼen system of governance. This MOU sets the path of legal recognition of Wetʼsuwetʼen title to 22,000 square kilometres of traditional territory. Clan Chief Na'Moks said, "It was very emotional for all of the hereditary chiefs because we all remember what our elders who have passed on said. We all know that this was their goal”. However, the MOU did not address the issue of the pipeline, and both construction and opposition by the Wetʼsuwetʼen continued.

==== 2021 ====
Construction of the CGL continued in 2021 following extension of the environmental certificate, and land defenders continued to obstruct construction with direct action.

In September, at least two people were arrested when land defenders constructed several blockades and locked themselves to machinery at a drill site where CGL crews were preparing to drill under the Morice River.

In October, land defenders seized a CGL excavator and evicted construction workers from Wetʼsuwetʼen territory.

On November 13, members of the Gidimt'en clan evicted construction workers, and when they refused to leave, land defenders seized an excavator, destroyed a segment of access road, and blocked a bridge with a crumpled minivan. Defenders criticized the RCMP for police brutality in previous encounters.

==== 2022 ====
In the early hours of February 17, 2022, twenty masked attackers, some carrying axes, forced nine people to flee from a work site near Houston, British Columbia. They attacked and injured RCMP officers attempting to respond. Ellis Ross, a Member of the Legislative Assembly of British Columbia, said "There were workers inside a truck while attackers were trying to light it on fire”.

=== Work camps ===
Work camps, sometimes called man camps by activists, are temporary housing facilities constructed for predominantly male workers on resource development projects. These projects may include but are not limited to industries related to oil and pipelines, mining, hydroelectric power, and lumber. The Coastal GasLink pipeline had 14 camps along its route, with each camp accounting for 500–800 workers during construction. Reports show a direct correlation between work camps and violence against Indigenous women and girls. When the Coastal GasLink pipeline filed for an extension to their project, the Lawyers for the Office of the Wetʼsuwetʼen cited the lack of meaningful accounting for the final report from the National Inquiry into Missing and Murdered Indigenous Women and Girls (MMIWG) to challenge the CGL extension. The final report found that “work camps, or ‘man camps,’ associated with the resource extraction industry are implicated in higher rates of violence against Indigenous women at the camps and in the neighbouring communities... Increased crime levels, including drug and alcohol related offenses, sexual offenses, and domestic and ‘gang’ violence, have been linked to ‘boom town’ and other resource development contexts”.

The British Columbia Environmental Assessment Office (BCEAO) oversaw the required environmental assessments for the CGL pipeline extension and accepted Coastal GasLink's request. Sociologist Jasmine Tordimah said that the BCEAO permitted an extension of the pipeline, “without fully addressing or acknowledging the severe and direct impacts this development and its proposed 14 ‘man camps’ would have on Indigenous women, girls, and Two-Spirit people”. Tordimah also said that “when men arrive at the project site, they ‘fetishize’ over Indigenous women while remaining ‘faceless’ and ‘nameless’, making it easier to commit crimes without facing the repercussions”. Similarly, the MMIWG Inquiry said that in regards to the CGL pipeline and other resource development projects, “there is an urgent need to consider the safety of Indigenous women consistently in all stages of project planning”.

=== Non-compliance orders ===
As of August 2020, Coastal GasLink had been issued several non-compliance orders, causing interruptions to construction work in certain areas along the route. In 2019, they faced an order after initiating work prior to informing trapline hunters near Houston. In spring 2020, Unistʼotʼen house group and Gidimtʼen clan members notified BC's Environmental Assessment Office (EAO) that CGL had damaged wetland areas. The assessment office found that the company's wetland management plan had not been followed in 42 wetlands areas, and issued another non-compliance order on June 16. A separate order was delivered on the same day due to the company's lack of efforts to mitigate harm to endangered whitebark pine in the area. A further non-compliance order was issued on June 22, 2020, for proceeding with work to clear the affected wetlands sites without conducting the appropriate environmental assessment surveys. These non-compliance orders led to a cessation of construction within 30 meters of designated wetlands areas until all appropriate measures were followed. The EAO also issued an enforcement order related to turbid water discharged into fish-bearing Fraser Lake.

Coastal GasLink has also been found out of compliance with the conditions of its environmental certificate in more than 50 instances, according to the Environmental Assessment Office's compliance program. These non-compliances include restricting access to traplines and failing to adequately dispose of camp garbage. Since the start of construction of the pipeline in 2019, the project has received penalties of more than $240,000 for repeated non-compliance with their environmental responsibilities. The project was fined $346,0000 for erosion and sediment control issues and for providing false information in inspection records.

CGL's self-reporting on environmental compliance has also revealed violations.

=== Supreme Court challenge of environmental certificate ===
On October 1, 2020, a hearing began in the BC Supreme Court, in which the Office of the Wet'suwet'en requested that the court reject the Environmental Assessment Office's decision to extend CGL's environmental certificate for five years. The company had filed for a one-time extension of their previous five-year certificate in April 2019. The Wet’suwet’en hereditary chiefs stated that with over 50 instances of non-compliance with the conditions of their environmental permits and for the findings of Canada's National Inquiry on Missing and Murdered Indigenous Women that show the project will increase violence towards indigenous women and girls, that the extension should not be granted. Coastal GasLink did not substantially start construction within the five years of its environmental certificate, which was mandated in the permit, so they requested the BCEAO grant them an extension. The BCEAO was then required to consider new adverse impacts that the project might bring and look at Coastal GasLink's compliance in the past. Legal counsel for the Wet’suwet’en with Woodward and Co, Caily DiPuma, said that, “The BCEAO didn’t do either of those things properly. We know there is a correlation between camps of workers, what are called ‘man camps,’ and violence against Indigenous girls and women and queer people”. DiPuma stated that the Environmental Assessment Office did not properly assess the risk that indigenous women and girls faced from extending the permits of the CGL pipeline. DiPuma said, “The BCEAO said Coastal GasLink would be prepared to consider doing so in the future. So, instead of creating a legally binding requirement for them to consider these harms, they took industry at its word that it would voluntarily do so at some point in the future”.

Lawyers for the Office of the Wet'suwet'en cited the lack of meaningful accounting for the final report on missing and murdered Indigenous women and girls (MMIWG), published in June 2019, as well as the pipeline company's long history of non-compliance with the Environmental Assessment Office's own conditions and standards. The EAO's position was that there was no basis for judiciary review of their decision.

In April 2021, the BC Supreme Court ruled that all concerns raised by the Office of Wet'suwet'en were unfounded, and the court approved the extension of CGL's environmental certificate.

== See also ==
- Enbridge Northern Gateway Pipelines
- Trans Mountain Pipeline
- Tsilhqotʼin Nation v British Columbia
