= Max Dean =

Max Dean is the name of:

- Max Dean (artist)
- Max Dean (footballer)
- Max Dean (DJ), British DJ and record producer
