= List of Sundar Prize Film Festival award winners =

List of award winners of the Sundar Prize Film Festival

The following is a list of award winners of the Sundar Prize Film Festival. The festival has presented juried awards in multiple categories, with cash prize values varying by year. The list also includes winners of the BC Youth Storyteller's Contest, an initiative of the festival's Luminaries Student and Youth Program.

== Award winners by year ==
=== 2024 ===
The following awards were presented at the inaugural Sundar Prize Film Festival in 2024.

- Best Animation - Unstoppable Beat by Luke Dye-Montefiore and Rufus Dye-Montefiore
- Best British Columbia Film - Dil Rakh: Gloves of Kin by Dalj Brar
- KDocsFF Best Emerging Filmmaker Residency Prize - Cash Cows by Shubham Chhabra
- Rogers Group of Funds Best Canadian Documentary - Eternal Spring by Jason Loftus
- Best Short Film - A Good Day Will Come by Amir Zargara
- Best International Documentary - Swallow Flying to the South by Mochi Lin
- Best Environmental Film - Rematriation by Alexi Liotti
- Best Student Film - DOSH by Radha Mehta
- Best Feature Film - Rosie by Gail Maurice

=== 2025 ===
The following awards were presented at the 2025 Sundar Prize Film Festival.

- Best Feature Film - Firma Aquí by Enrique Vázquez
- Best Short Film - The Poem We Sang by Annie Sakab
- Rogers Group of Funds Best Canadian Documentary - Tea Creek by Ryan David Lee Dickie
- Knowledge Network Best International Documentary - This Is Who We Are by Peter Lilly
- Best Animation - Have I Swallowed Your Dream by Clara Chan
- Best Environmental Film - Tea Creek by Ryan David Lee Dickie
- Best 2SLGBTQ+ Film - Leilani’s Fortune by Loveleen Kaur
- Best Youth Film (19 and under) - LOOK by Georgia Tindle Acken
- Best Student Film - Desync by Minerva Marie Navasca
- Best British Columbia Feature Film - Mareya Shot Keetha Goal: Make the Shot by Baljit Sangra and Nilesh Patel
- Best British Columbia Short Film - Stand In by Hiromu Yamawaki
- KDocsFF Best Emerging Filmmaker Residency Prize - Velvet Secrets by Shanthini Balasubramanian

==== BC Youth Storyteller's Contest ====
The following awards were presented in 2025 as part of the festival's inaugural Luminaries Student and Youth Program.

- First Prize - Facade by Kexin (Coco) Chen
- Second Prize - Crash and Deliver by Jane Ifunanya Diokpo
- Third Prize - The Name I Choose by Wendy Shenglin Zhang

=== 2026 ===
The following awards were presented at the 2026 Sundar Prize Film Festival.

- Best Feature Film - Bayaan by Bikas Ranjan Mishra
- Best Short Film - One Day This Kid by Alexander Farah
- Best Feature Documentary - Saints and Warriors by Patrick Shannon
- Best Short Documentary - Light Through the Blindfold by Alireza Kazemipour
- Best Short Animation - Sing to the Wind by Yaffa Aboudib Husseini
- Best Environmental Film - The Fire in Our Hearts by Josias Tschanz
- Best 2SLGBTQ+ Film - If by Tathagata Ghosh
- Best Student Film - Praying for Love by Sofia Tonin
- Best Youth Film (19 and under) - Fallen by Angela Ruohan Yan
- Best British Columbia Feature Film - A Cree Approach by Tristin Greyeyes
- Best British Columbia Short Film - Red Light Rebel by Hannah Yang
- BC Student Film Showcase Award, First Prize - Home Is a Feeling by Ryah SM King
- BC Student Film Showcase Award, Second Prize - Through the Flow of Summer Snow by Sophia Santos English
- BC Student Film Showcase Award, Third Prize - Pan de Muerto by Renata Calderon
- Best Spiritual, Health and Wellness Film - Et maintenant? (What Now?) by Jocelyn Forgues
- KDocsFF Best Emerging Filmmaker Residency Prize - Burcu's Angels by Özgün Gündüz
- The Performer's Mastery Award for Outstanding BC Performance - Medha Gautham, for performances in E for Effort, Never Excellence, Shitcute, and It's Not You

== Award winners by award ==
=== Best Feature Film ===
- 2024 - Rosie by Gail Maurice
- 2025 - Firma Aquí by Enrique Vázquez
- 2026 - Bayaan by Bikas Ranjan Mishra

=== Best Short Film ===
- 2024 - A Good Day Will Come by Amir Zargara
- 2025 - The Poem We Sang by Annie Sakab
- 2026 - One Day This Kid by Alexander Farah

=== Rogers Group of Funds Best Canadian Documentary ===
- 2024 - Eternal Spring by Jason Loftus
- 2025 - Tea Creek by Ryan David Lee Dickie

=== Best International Documentary ===
- 2024 - Swallow Flying to the South by Mochi Lin

=== Knowledge Network Best International Documentary ===
- 2025 - This Is Who We Are by Peter Lilly

=== Best Feature Documentary ===
- 2026 - Saints and Warriors by Patrick Shannon

=== Best Short Documentary ===
- 2026 - Light Through the Blindfold by Alireza Kazemipour

=== Animation ===
Best Animation

- 2024 - Unstoppable Beat by Luke Dye-Montefiore and Rufus Dye-Montefiore
- 2025 - Have I Swallowed Your Dream by Clara Chan

Best Short Animation

- 2026 - Sing to the Wind by Yaffa Aboudib Husseini

=== Best Environmental Film ===
- 2024 - Rematriation by Alexi Liotti
- 2025 - Tea Creek by Ryan David Lee Dickie
- 2026 - The Fire in Our Hearts by Josias Tschanz

=== Best 2SLGBTQ+ Film ===
- 2025 - Leilani’s Fortune by Loveleen Kaur
- 2026 - If by Tathagata Ghosh

=== Best Student Film ===
- 2024 - DOSH by Radha Mehta
- 2025 - Desync by Minerva Marie Navasca
- 2026 - Praying for Love by Sofia Tonin

=== Best Youth Film (19 and under) ===
- 2025 - LOOK by Georgia Tindle Acken
- 2026 - Fallen by Angela Ruohan Yan

=== Best British Columbia Film ===
- 2024 - Dil Rakh: Gloves of Kin by Dalj Brar

=== Best British Columbia Feature Film ===
- 2025 - Mareya Shot Keetha Goal: Make the Shot by Baljit Sangra and Nilesh Patel
- 2026 - A Cree Approach by Tristin Greyeyes

=== Best British Columbia Short Film ===
- 2025 - Stand In by Hiromu Yamawaki
- 2026 - Red Light Rebel by Hannah Yang

=== BC Student Film Showcase Award ===
- 2026, First Prize - Home Is a Feeling by Ryah SM King
- 2026, Second Prize - Through the Flow of Summer Snow by Sophia Santos English
- 2026, Third Prize - Pan de Muerto by Renata Calderon

=== Best Spiritual, Health and Wellness Film ===
- 2026 - Et maintenant? (What Now?) by Jocelyn Forgues

=== KDocsFF Best Emerging Filmmaker Residency Prize ===
- 2024 - Cash Cows by Shubham Chhabra
- 2025 - Velvet Secrets by Shanthini Balasubramanian
- 2026 - Burcu's Angels by Özgün Gündüz

=== BC Youth Storyteller's Contest ===
- 2025, First Prize - Facade by Kexin (Coco) Chen
- 2025, Second Prize - Crash and Deliver by Jane Ifunanya Diokpo
- 2025, Third Prize - The Name I Choose by Wendy Shenglin Zhang

=== The Performer's Mastery Award for Outstanding BC Performance ===
- 2026 - Medha Gautham, for performances in E for Effort, Never Excellence, Shitcute, and It's Not You
