= Aisha's Story =

- Directed by: Elizabeth Vibert; Chen Wang
- Written by: Elizabeth Vibert
- Produced by: Elizabeth Vibert; Salam Barakat Guenette
- Starring: Aisha Azzam
- Cinematography: Chen Wang; Isaac Hatfield
- Edited by: Elizabeth Vibert; Chen Wang
- Music by: Basel Zayed; Shoko Inoue; Bashar Smairat
- Release date: April 26, 2025 (Hot Docs)
- Running time: 62 minutes
- Country: Canada
- Language: Arabic

Aisha's Story is a 2025 Canadian documentary film, directed by Elizabeth Vibert and Chen Wang and co-produced by Salam Barakat Guenette. The film centres on Aisha Azzam, a Palestinian woman living in the Baqa'a refugee camp in Jordan, who runs a grain mill to prepare the cereals and herbs essential to Palestinian cuisine. In the film her son Omar speaks of his mother's work to protect food heritage as a key mode of resistance, and daughter Rawand describes food work as an instance of sumud, the Palestinian practice of steadfastness. The film has been called "a profound exploration of how cultural identity is preserved through the tangible rituals of food and labor," and "a testament to the ways food remains central to Palestinian identity, rooted as it is in history, tradition, and the ongoing struggle for survival and resilience."

Vibert first met Azzam when she was in Jordan in 2018 screening the film The Thinking Garden, which she wrote and co-produced with director Christine Welsh. Vibert and Azzam then began the oral history collaboration on which the film is based.

Aisha's Story had its world premiere at the 2025 Hot Docs Canadian International Documentary Festival, where it won the Audience Award for Mid-Length Films and was a Top 20 Audience Favourite. It then screened as the opening film of the DOXA Documentary Film Festival, and went on to festival screenings in Jordan, Jerusalem, Morocco, Gaza, Türkiye, the US, UK, France, Italy, Switzerland, Denmark, Korea, Spain, and Brazil. It received the Best Feature Documentary Award at Al Ard festival in Sardinia, Italy, and at the Toronto Women Film Festival, a University of Toronto competition for as-yet-unreleased films by emerging women filmmakers. The film is distributed in the US by Watermelon Pictures as well as educational distributor EPF Media, and in South Korea by broadcaster EBS.
