= Sleydo' Molly Wickham =

Gidimt'en clan chief and activist

Sleydo'
- Born: 1986 (age 39–40); British Columbia, Canada
- Other name: Molly Ann Wickham
- Occupation: Activist
- Years active: 2020-present
- Known for: Costal GasLink Pipeline protests, Yintah

Map of Wet'suwet'en territory. Sleydo' is part of the Wet'suwet'en Nation.

Sleydo (born 1986), also known as Molly Ann Wickham, is an Indigenous activist and Wing Chief of the Cas Yikh, a house group of the Gidimt'en Clan of the Wet'suwet'en Nation. She gained prominence in 2020 when she became a spokesperson for the Wet'suwet'en during the conflict between the First Nation and the Coastal GasLink Pipeline project.

Sleydo' is featured in the documentary film Yintah, meaning "land" in the Wet'suwet'en language. The documentary shows the Wet'suwet'en nation's fight for sovereignty as they resist the construction of multiple oil and fracked-gas pipelines across their territory. Her sister, Jennifer Wickham, was one of the film's directors.

== Education ==
Initially, Sleydo' planned to pursue a law degree but switched to an Indigenous Governance program. She obtained a Bachelor of Arts at the University of Victoria in 2008 and continued to pursue a Masters degree. She completed her Master of Arts in the Department of Human and Social Development in 2010. Her thesis focused on how Canadian colonialism displaced Indigenous children from their families, disrupting traditional community structures and cultural continuity. She discussed how grassroots community efforts worked to reunite displaced individuals and reclaim Indigenous control over cultural survival.

== Activism ==
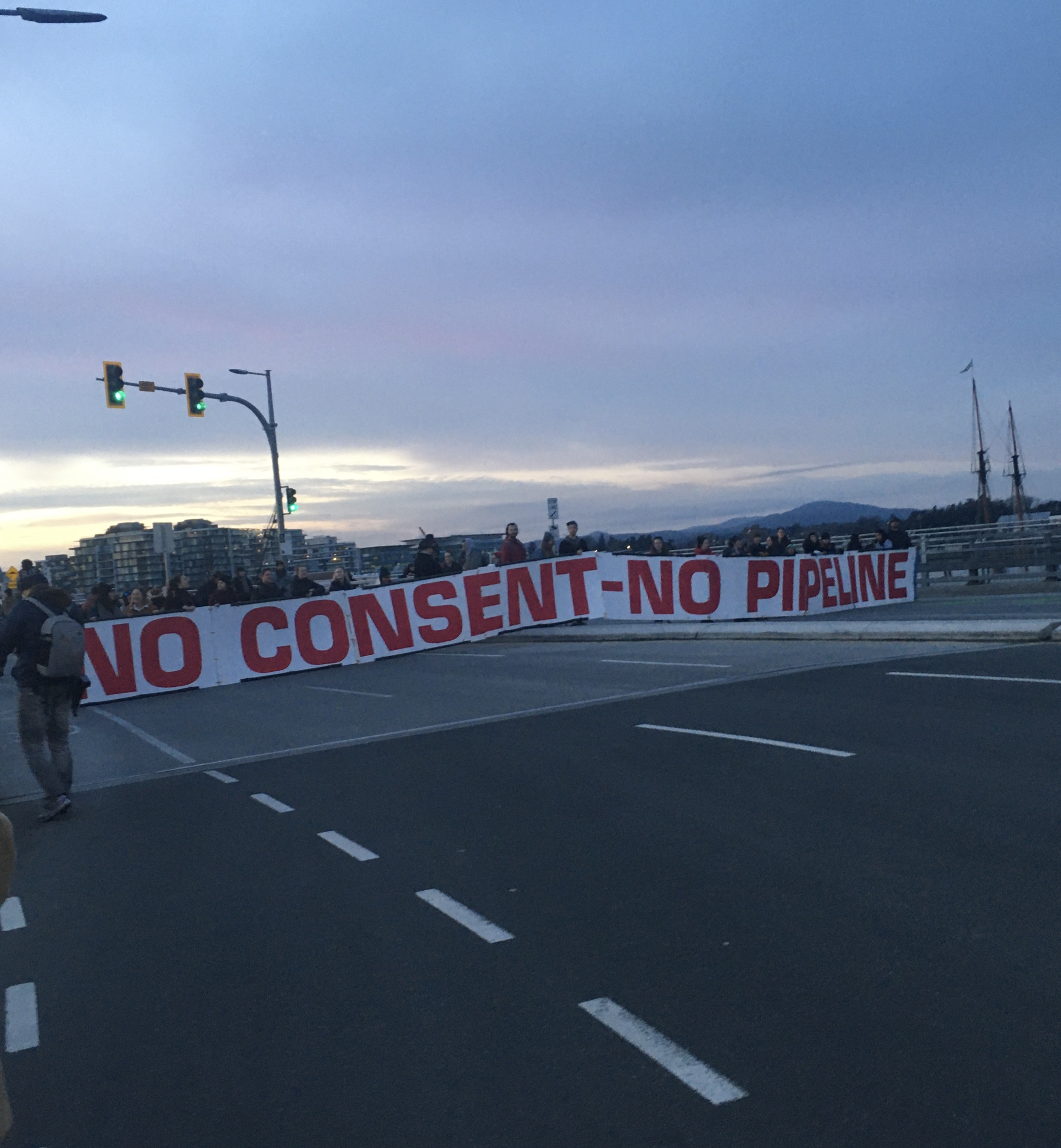
Protest banner at a demonstration in Victoria BC, in solidarity with Wet'suwet'en activists.

Sleydo' gained prominence as a land defender and activist opposing the Coastal GasLink pipeline. For 55 days, Sleydo' blocked the advance of the Coastal GasLink pipeline at the Gidimt'en Checkpoint. She became the spokesperson for the blockade and actively opposed the incursions of the pipeline workers and the RCMP into Wet'suwet'en territory. Sleydo' has expressed concerns about human rights violations by the RCMP and Forsythe, the private security company hired by Coastal GasLink. According to Sleydo', they have engaged in intimidation of the Wet'suwet'en, including surveillance of children.

On November 19, 2021, Sleydo' and seven others were arrested after allegedly defying a court order to allow pipeline workers access through the Gidimt'en Checkpoint. In a podcast appearance, Sleydo' explained how she was jailed for nearly a week, subjected to inhumane treatment, and moved between multiple jails. She stated how the RCMP used excessive force, targeting her specifically and even questioning her Wet'suwet'en identity.

In July 2022, Sleydo' was among twenty activists that were formally charged with criminal contempt of court. Sleydo', Shaylynn Sampson and Corey Jayochee Jocko were found guilty in January 2024. The British Columbia Supreme Court was set to hold a hearing on an abuse of process application filed by Sleydo' Molly Wickham, Shaylynn Sampson, and Corey Jayohcee Jocko after their criminal contempt conviction, but was postponed to September 3, 2024 due to unforeseen health issues.

During the abuse of process hearing, video footage was presented showing the RCMP harassing land defenders, using racist language, and employing excessive force during their arrest and the raid on the Coastal GasLink pipeline construction site.

On February 18, 2025, the British Columbia Supreme Court ruled in favour of the abuse of process claim brought by Sleydo' Molly Wickham, Shaylynn Sampson, and Corey Jayohcee Jocko recognizing misconduct in their criminalization for opposing the Coastal GasLink pipeline project in 2019.

In October 2025, Sleydo' was sentenced to 17 days imprisonment for breaching a court injunction that banned land defence actions near the construction site of the Coastal GasLink pipeline. Amnesty International described the sentence against Sleydo' and others as providing a "chilling message" about indigenous rights in Canada.

== Personal life ==
Sleydo' did not grow up on her traditional territory and did not speak the Wet'suwet'en language as a child. Both of her grandparents were placed in the Lejac Residential School as children and her mother, June, was a survivor of the Sixties Scoop and placed in white foster care as a baby.

Sleydo' credits her university experience with reconnecting her with her roots. After finishing her degree, she decided to move to her home territory with her Haida (now ex) husband, Cody Merriman, whom she met at the University of Victoria. Together, they have three children and they are being raised on Wet'suwet'en territory with traditional knowledge. Sleydo' has actively worked to learn the Wet'suwet'en language and is not fluent.

== See also ==
- Yintah
- 2020 Canadian pipeline and railway protests
- Coastal GasLink pipeline
