= Eternal Spring (film) =

2022 Canadian documentary film

- Theatrical release poster
- Traditional Chinese: 長春
- Simplified Chinese: 长春
- Literal meaning: Eternal Spring / Changchun
- Hanyu Pinyin: Chángchūn
- Directed by: Jason Loftus
- Written by: Jason Loftus
- Produced by: Jason Loftus; Masha Loftus; Yvan Pinard; Kevin Koo
- Starring: Daxiong
- Cinematography: John Minh Tran
- Edited by: David Schmidt
- Music by: Thomas William Hill
- Production company: Lofty Sky Entertainment
- Release date: March 15, 2022 (Thessaloniki)
- Running time: 86 minutes
- Country: Canada
- Languages: English; Mandarin

Eternal Spring (Chinese: 长春) is a 2022 Canadian adult animated documentary film written, directed, and co-produced by Jason Loftus. Based around the animation of Chinese artist Daxiong, the film centres on Falun Gong's 2002 hijacking of broadcast television stations in Changchun and China's continued repression of ethnic and religious minority groups.

The film premiered at the Thessaloniki Documentary Festival on March 15, 2022. It was subsequently screened at the 2022 Hot Docs Canadian International Documentary Festival, where it was named the overall winner of the Hot Docs Audience Award for most popular film in the festival, and the first-place winner of the Rogers Audience Award for the most popular Canadian film.

In August 2022, the film was announced as Canada's submission for the Academy Award for Best International Feature Film at the 95th Academy Awards, but it was not nominated. It was the first documentary film and the first animated film ever submitted by Canada, and only the fourth time since 1971 that a film was selected in a language other than French. On November 9, 2022, the Academy of Motion Picture Arts and Sciences officially deemed the film eligible for consideration in the Best Animated Feature category.

== Reception ==
On the review aggregator website Rotten Tomatoes, the film holds an approval rating of 79% based on 33 reviews from critics, with an average rating of 7.6/10. The site's critical consensus reads, "More impressive in form than function, Eternal Spring offers a periodically gripping mixed-media account of a pivotal moment in modern Chinese history". On Metacritic, the film has a weighted average score of 71 out of 100, based on 10 reviews, indicating "generally favorable reviews".

Carlos Aguilar of the Los Angeles Times described the film as "distinctively incisive on an emotional level," noting that it "applauds the bravery of its participants to relive a painful shared trauma and create a permanent testament of what they endured." He wrote: "The most inspired among the many animated passages into the past is one that materializes Daxiong's childhood memories of winter in his hometown of Changchun City, where Falun Gong originated and the epicenter of the repression. For a moment, he invites us to witness a period before the horrors of torture and incarceration tainted his memories of his home. Loftus' foresight to include the behind-the-scenes process as part of the story — we see Daxiong working with the animation team and engaging in casual chats with the other subjects — also reinforces the direct link between creator and creation."

Cath Clarke of The Guardian rated Eternal Spring 4 out of 5, describing it as a "painful, important film, made more urgent in light of China's tightening of religious freedoms and human rights abuses against Uyghurs and other Muslims." Chris Knight of the National Post called the film a "moving tour de force, which deserves to be widely seen" and rated it 5 out of 5.

In a review for The Globe and Mail, Amil Niazi wrote: "From the very first scenes of the Canadian documentary Eternal Spring, you're thrust into a thrilling, all-consuming film that challenges traditional documentary tropes and finds a way to tell a winding, difficult story with brilliant ease." She concluded: "Watching these painful, shared memories come to life, seeing up close as the few who made it out are able to pay homage to those who didn't, it's hard not to think of all those who continue to be punished for practising their beliefs in China, from the Falun Gong practitioners to the Uyghur Muslims. Perhaps a film like this can illuminate what is lost in shadow, much like the hijackers did on that night in 2002. Either way, their message is being rebroadcast in the loudest possible way with Eternal Spring."

The film won the "TV/Video Award" at the 2026 Sandford St Martin Awards, which recognize excellence in broadcasting on religion, ethics, and spirituality. The judges noted that the film “really pushed the boundaries of the genre” and praised it as “so brave in its creative endeavour.”

== Awards and nominations ==
Award	Date of ceremony	Category	Recipient(s)	Result	Ref.
Hot Docs Canadian International Documentary Festival	May 2022	Hot Docs Audience Award	Eternal Spring	Won	
Hot Docs Canadian International Documentary Festival	May 2022	Rogers Audience Award for Best Canadian Documentary	Eternal Spring	Won	
Zurich Film Festival	October 2, 2022	Best International Documentary Film	Eternal Spring	Nominated	
Vancouver Film Critics Circle	February 13, 2023	Best Canadian Film	Eternal Spring	Nominated	
Vancouver Film Critics Circle	February 13, 2023	Best Canadian Documentary	Eternal Spring	Won	
Vancouver Film Critics Circle	February 13, 2023	Best Director of a Canadian Film	Jason Loftus	Nominated	
Annie Awards	February 25, 2023	Outstanding Achievement for Writing in an Animated Feature Production	Jason Loftus	Nominated	
Sundar Prize Film Festival	June 16, 2024	Rogers Group of Funds Best Canadian Documentary	Jason Loftus	Won	
Sandford St Martin Awards	June 2026	TV/Video Award	Eternal Spring	Won	

== See also ==
- List of submissions to the 95th Academy Awards for Best International Feature Film
- List of Canadian submissions for the Academy Award for Best International Feature Film
