= Daxiong =

Chinese comics artist

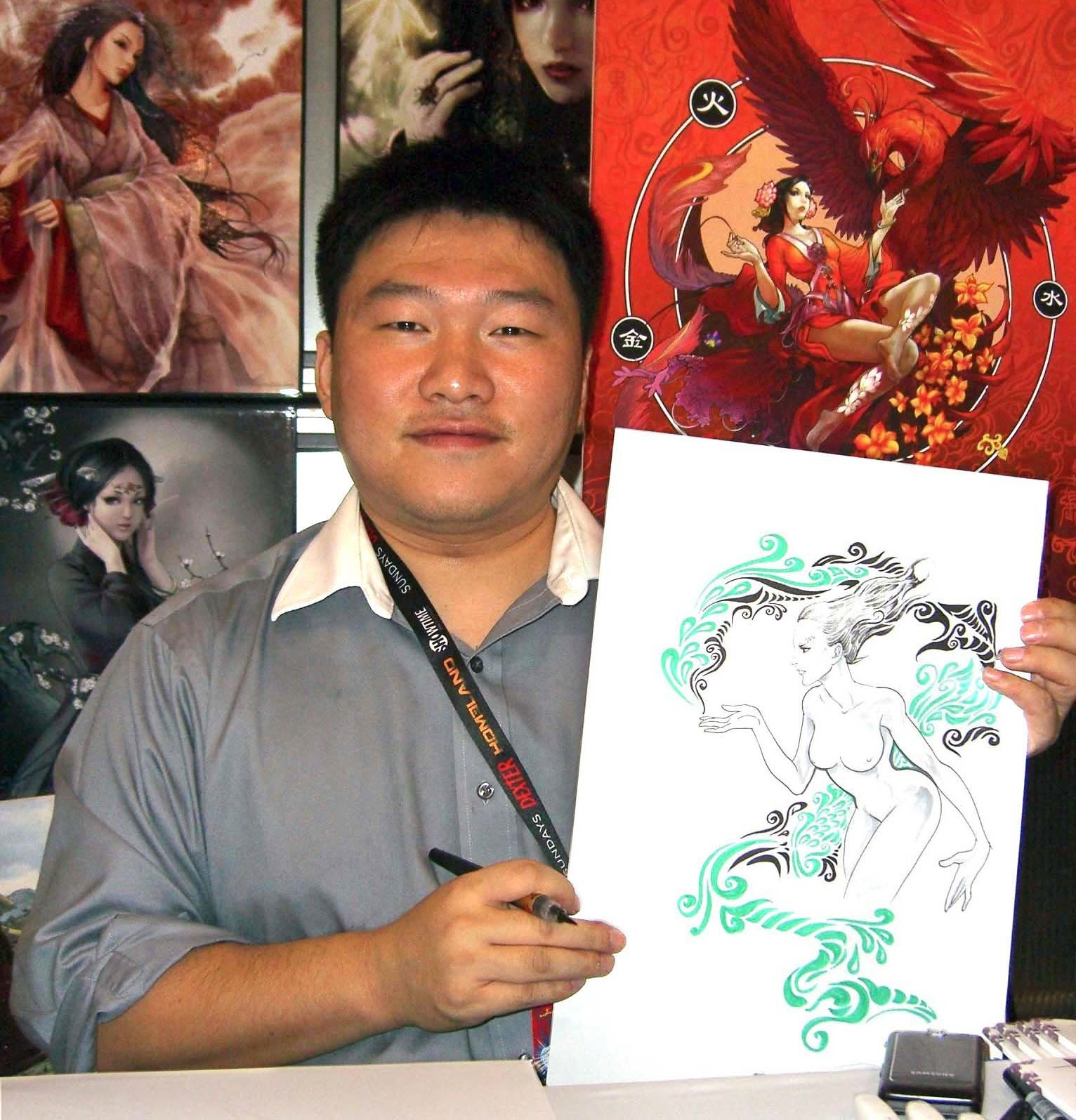
- Daxiong at the 2011 New York Comic Con
- Born: Guo Jingxiong; December 25, 1975 (age 50); Jilin, China
- Known for: Comic books

Daxiong
- Chinese: 大雄
- Literal meaning: Big Xiong
Transcriptions
Standard Mandarin
- Hanyu Pinyin: Dàxióng
- IPA: [tâ.ɕjʊ̌ŋ]

Alternative Chinese name
- Traditional Chinese: 郭競雄
- Simplified Chinese: 郭竞雄
Transcriptions
Standard Mandarin
- Hanyu Pinyin: Guō Jìngxióng

Guo Jingxiong, known as Daxiong (Daa-Shong) (born December 25, 1975), is a comic book artist, editor and publisher. In 2022, he participated in the creation of Eternal Spring, a partially animated documentary film by Jason Loftus, about Falun Gong's 2002 hijacking of broadcast television stations in Changchun.
