= The Monastery: Mr. Vig and the Nun =

- Directed by: Pernille Rose Grønkjær
- Produced by: Sigrid Dyekjær
- Cinematography: Pernille Rose Grønkjær
- Edited by: Pernille Bech Christensen
- Music by: Johan Söderqvist
- Distributed by: Koch-Lorber Films
- Release date: 2006
- Running time: 84 minutes
- Country: Denmark
- Language: Danish

The Monastery: Mr. Vig and the Nun is a 2006 Danish documentary film directed by Pernille Rose Grønkjær.

== Summary ==
Jørgen Laursen Vig owns a Danish estate, with a ramshackle castle, on the island of Fyn, he has long dreamed of turning his castle into a Russian orthodox monastery.

After a visit to Russia to negotiate with the Russian patriarchate, a delegation of nuns headed by Sister Amvrosija comes to Denmark in order to assess whether Vig's castle is fit to serve as a monastery. The nuns approve the castle, but at the same time, they demand extensive repairs to it. When the nuns leave again for Russia, Vig sets out to do the repairs by himself.

The following summer Sister Amvrosija and the other nuns return and Vig's dream seems about to come true. The nuns move into the castle, and slowly they take over the daily work and introduce new routines.

Vig's life changes; all his life he has lived by himself with no women around, now he has to share his home with the strong-willed Sister Amvrosija and her fellow nuns. They demand more and more repairs; as a solution, the Russian patriarchate offers to pay for all future repairs to the castle, but on condition that Vig leaves his castle to them in his will.

Vig has serious doubts: should he leave his castle to the Russian church in his will and thus fulfil his dream of creating a monastery? Or should he keep his castle to himself and continue his life as a bachelor? Vig faces many conflicts with the apparently difficult Sister Amvrosija, but she does not want to leave him and his castle, even if she is the only nun left.

By the end of the film, the monastery is run by Sister Amvrosija. The Russian Orthodox priest Hegumen Theofan, Dean of the St. Alexander Nevsky Parish in Copenhagen, regularly comes to conduct services. The Russian Patriarchate and the Hesbjerg Foundation are negotiating the future plans for the monastery, and an agreement appears to be well on its way.

== Awards ==
- Joris Ivens Award – Amersterdam, IDFA 2006
- Grand Prix – Chicago International Documentary Festival 2007
- Special Mention – CPH Dox Copenhagen Documentary Festival 2006
- Charles E. Guggenheim Emerging Artist Award – Durham, Full Frame Documentary Film Festival 2007
- Grand Jury Award – Durham, Full Frame Documentary Film Festival 2007
- Honorable Mention – São Paulo It's All True Int. Documentary FF 2007
- FIPRESCI Award for Best Documentary – Sidney Film Festival 2007
- Millennium Award for Best Film – Warsaw, Planete Doc Review 2007
- The Kino Magazine Award – Warsaw, Planete Doc Review 2007
- Audience Award – Moscow International Film Festival 2007
- Best Documentary Nominee – Film Independent Spirit Awards 2008
- Outstanding Achievement in International Nonfiction Feature – Cinema Eye Honors 2008
- Outstanding Achievement in Nonfiction Feature Filmmaking Nominee – Cinema Eye Honors 2008
- Outstanding Achievement in a Debut Feature Nominee – Cinema Eye Honors 2008
