= Unistʼotʼen Camp =

Indigenous protest site in British Columbia, Canada

- Indigenous camp
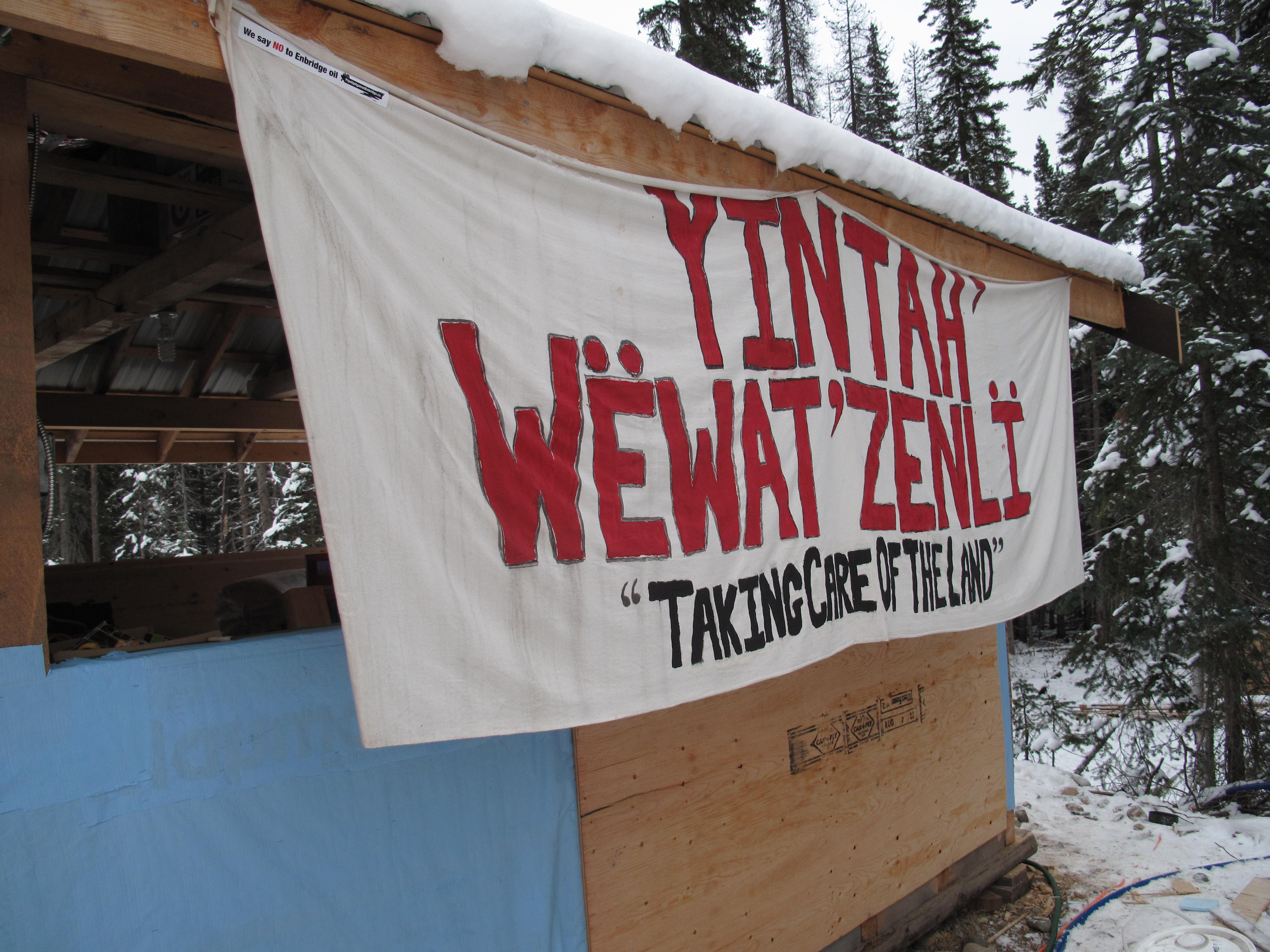
- Building at the Unistoten Camp with a banner reading: "Taking Care of the Land"

- Location within Canada
- Coordinates: 54.193425°N 127.368951°W
- Established: 2010
- Website: unistoten.camp

The Unistʼotʼen Camp is a protest camp and Indigenous healing centre in northern British Columbia, Canada. It is located within the traditional territory of the Unist'otʼen clan of the Wetʼsuwetʼen First Nation peoples. Established after the proposal of several pipeline projects in the area, it is situated where several pipelines will pass, as a means to block their construction.

Located 1,200 kilometres (750 mi) by road from Vancouver, BC and about 130 kilometres (81 mi) from the town of Smithers, it is on the shores of the Wedzin Kwah (or Morice River) at the mouth of Gosnell Creek. These are both tributaries of the Skeena, Bulkley, and Babine rivers. Members of the Unisʼtotʼen clan, First Nations peoples, and other supporters staff the camp.

The Wetʼsuwetʼen built a checkpoint some 20 kilometres (12 mi) east of the camp, on the Morice West Forest Service Road. At this checkpoint, visitors had to have prior consent to enter the territory and the Wetʼsuwetʼen barred construction workers and equipment. In 2019, the Coastal GasLink Pipeline went to court to enforce the permission granted by the Wetʼsuwetʼen and other First Nations band councils to build in the area. A court decision in 2020 granted an injunction against the Unisʼtotʼen clan and its supporters. In February 2020, the Royal Canadian Mounted Police (RCMP) dismantled the blockades and checkpoints on the Morice Road to enforce the injunction. After the RCMP's actions, there have been numerous protests across Canada supporting the Wetʼsuwetʼen.

== History ==
The camp was set up in 2010 by hereditary chiefs of the Wetʼsuwetʼen First Nation, who opposed several elected Wetʼsuwetʼen band councils which signed agreements to build the pipeline. At the exact points where pipelines were intended to cross the Unistʼotʼen Territory of Talbits Kwah, a traditional pithouse and permaculture garden were built. The camp also includes several small greenhouses and a secure all-season bunkhouse.

The camp was constructed as a means to block the development of numerous pipelines and other projects deemed harmful to the land. These include pipelines from Enbridge, the Pacific Trails Pipeline (Chevron), as well as seven proposed pipelines from the Alberta Oil Sands and LNG from the Horn River Basin Projects in the Peace River Region.

In 2015, the Unistʼotʼen released a declaration which included this statement:

"The Unistʼotʼen settlement camp is not a protest or a demonstration. Our clan is occupying and using our traditional territory as it has for centuries. Our free, prior, and informed consent protocol is in place at the entrance of our territory as an expression of our jurisdiction and our inherent right to both give and refuse consent and entry into our territory."

The camp is the site of activities related to healing and learning. Construction of a healing centre began in 2015. The healing centre welcomes people to reconnect with the land, learn cultural practices, and recover from health issues such as substance abuse, using traditional Indigenous methods. According to the traditional beliefs of the Wetʼsuwetʼen people, healing can come from being connected to the land and that the impacts of colonialism, including living away from traditional territories, are harmful. A youth camp provides opportunities for young people to learn and practice their culture.

== Indigenous sovereignty and title ==
Underlying issues of the protest include Indigenous sovereignty and Aboriginal title. The Wetʼsuwetʼen system of governance pre-dates the formation of the country of Canada, and members of the Wetʼsuwetʼen people have never signed a treaty with the Canadian government. For many Indigenous peoples in Canada, the recognition of traditional title to land is of vital importance and pre-cedes colonial law and impositions.

In 1984, the Wetʼsuwetʼen and Gitxsan First Nations sued the BC Government over the granting of clear-cut logging in their territories. In 1991, the BC Supreme Court ruled that Aboriginal title was extinguished in 1858, prior to Confederation and the Nations had no right to stop the logging. This was appealed by the Wetʼsuwetʼen and Gitxsan First Nations to the Supreme Court of Canada, which ruled that Aboriginal title had not been extinguished. It ordered a new trial, but recommended negotiation. Treaty negotiations broke down after the BC government refused to agree to the nations having sovereignty over more than 4-6 per cent of its traditional territory.

The Canadian government's continued support for extraction industries over the recognition of Indigenous sovereignty and adhesion to the United Nations' Declaration on the Rights of Indigenous Peoples (UNDRIP), of which Canada is a signatory, is a major friction point in some segments of contemporary Canadian society.

== Unist'otʼen checkpoint conflict ==
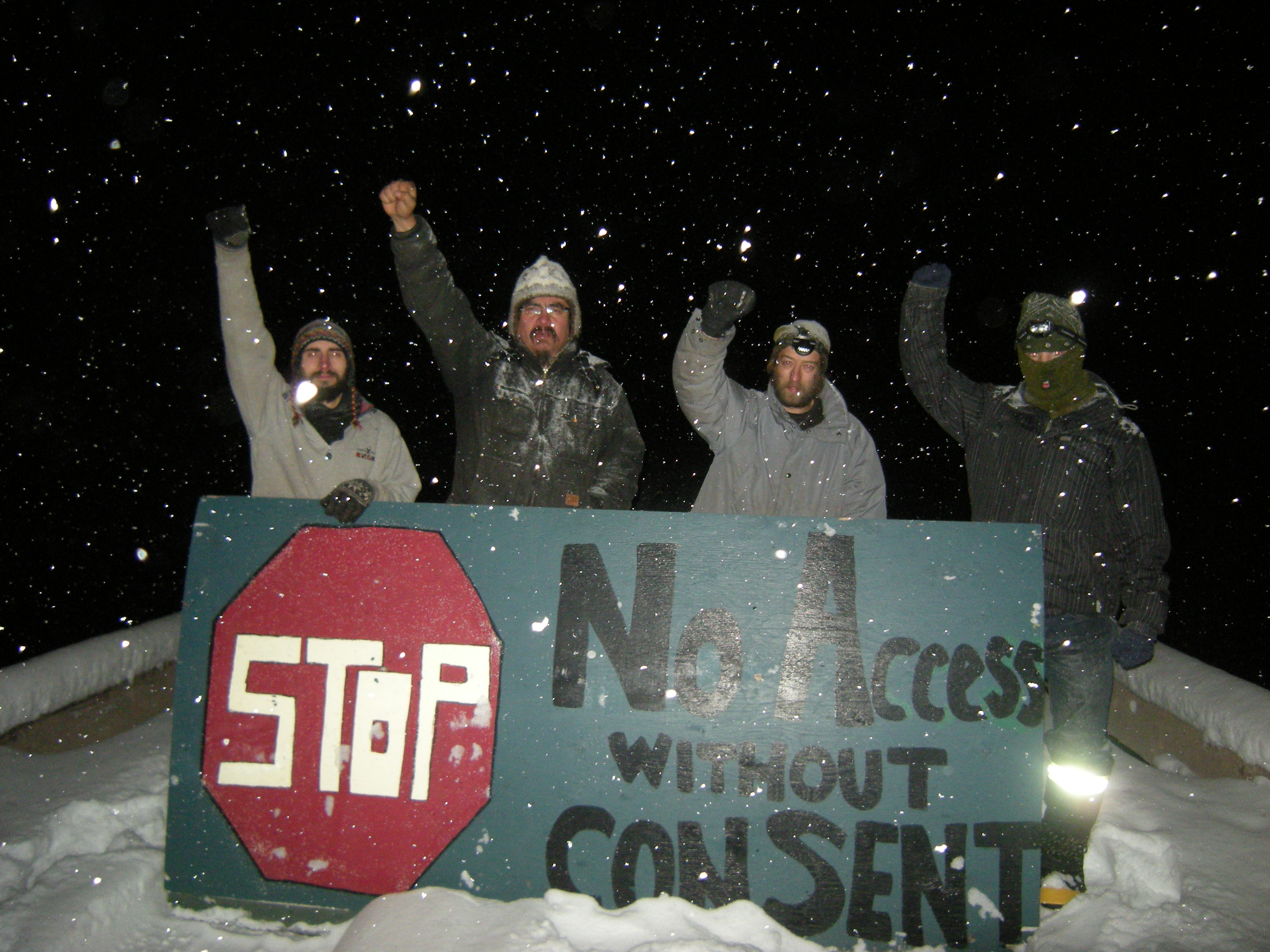
Members of the Unistoten Camp behind a checkpoint sign. The sign reads: No access without consent.

Several kilometres east of the camp, the Wetʼsuwetʼen set up a checkpoint on the Morice River Forest Services Road, controlling access to the area. The area was blocked to the pipeline project.

In 2018, TC Energy was granted an injunction to remove the checkpoint and have complete access to the pipeline project construction. In January 2019, the RCMP entered the territory to enforce the court injunction and allow workers from the Coastal GasLink pipeline project temporary access to the area. The RCMP arrested 14 people on January 8 at the checkpoint. The pipeline workers completed their pre-construction work. Afterwards, the blockades were rebuilt.

Supporters of the blockade consider the action taken at the Unisʼtotʼen checkpoint and the lack of consultation with hereditary chiefs to be violations of the United Nations' Declaration on the Rights of Indigenous Peoples (UNDRIP). Many Indigenous peoples have written and discussed the ways this action will impact the Canadian government's efforts to implement the recommendations of the Truth and Reconciliation Commission Report, with many notable Indigenous peoples such as broadcaster Jesse Wente, speaking at rallies and protests.

In December 2019, the injunction was re-instated. Another round of discussions ended without the pipeline proponents convincing the hereditary chiefs and their supporters to withdraw. The RCMP returned to the area in 2020 and arrests began again as the RCMP cleared the Morice Forest Service Road, including the arrests of Wetʼsuwetʼen matriarchs. Supporters of the blockade remained in residences along the road, including the camp.

"they were arrested in the middle of a ceremony to honour the ancestors. Police tore down the red dresses that were hung to hold the spirits of missing and murdered Indigenous women, girls, and two spirit people. They extinguished [their] sacred fire. [They] have had enough. Enough dialogue, discussion, negotiation at the barrel of a gun. Canada comes to colonize. Reconciliation is dead. It is time to fight for [their] land, [their] lives, [their] children, [their] future. Revolution lives (“Reconciliation is dead. Revolution is alive”, n.d.)".

— Reconciliation Is Dead. Revolution is Alive, Unist’ot’en Camp website

The arrests sparked widespread protests in BC and across Canada in support of the Wetʼsuwetʼen.

Solidarity statements supporting the preservation of the Unistʼotʼen Camp were issued by organizations and institutions such as: OCAD University, the British Columbia Teachers' Federation, Ryerson University School of Social Work.
