= Colette Urban =

Canadian/American artist

- Born: Constance Joyce Urban; January 29, 1952; Denver, Colorado
- Died: June 16, 2013 (aged 61); McIvers, Newfoundland, Canada
- Education: Nova Scotia College of Art (B.F.A.,1980); University of Victoria (M.F.A., 1982)
- Known for: Performance artist, Installation artist, Sculptor, Video Artist
- Awards: VANL-CARFAC Excellence in Visual Arts Long Haul Award
- Elected: The Royal Canadian Academy of Arts
- Memorials: Colette Urban Memorial Trail

Constance "Colette" Joyce Urban (January 29, 1952 – June 16, 2013) was a Canadian/American artist known for performance art, sculpture and installation. Her work questioned social conventions, gender roles, and the relationship between spectator and performer, as well as consumer culture and the everyday with a disarming and humorous tone. Urban was a tenured Professor of Visual Arts at University of Western Ontario in London, Ontario, Canada, until 2006, when she relocated to the Bay of Islands, in Western Newfoundland and based herself in the communities of Meadows and McIvers, Newfoundland, to develop Full Tilt Creative Centre, an artist residency, organic farm and exhibition venue. In November 2012, after a lengthy period of mysterious pain, Urban was diagnosed with Stage 4 Cancer. She died at her home in McIvers in 2013.

== Biography ==
=== Early life and beginnings ===
Constance "Colette" Joyce Urban was born in Denver, Colorado in 1952. She grew up in Michigan and North Carolina. After her mother recognized Urban's strong potential for art she enrolled both Colette and her sister into art classes at the art museum in Charlotte, North Carolina. After receiving her BFA from the Nova Scotia College of Art and Design (1980) she went on to earn her MFA from the University of Victoria (1982). She then went on to teach in several universities across Canada.

In 2007 she moved to the town of Meadows in Newfoundland and established the Full Tilt Creative Centre in the nearby town of McIvers. After her death in 2013, the town of McIvers, Newfoundland named a walking trail in her honor, now known as the Colette Urban Memorial Trail.

=== Teaching career ===
After receiving her BFA from the Nova Scotia College of Art and Design and her MFA from the University of Victoria Urban went on to teach at several universities across Canada, including the University of Victoria and Simon Fraser University in British Columbia, the University of Toronto, Sir Wilfred Grenfell College at Memorial University in Corner Brook, Newfoundland, and Western University, London, Ontario, where she lived for eleven years.

== Exhibitions and Notable works ==
Urban's has an extensive exhibition and performance record, including the following solo exhibitions: Pin Up at Grunt Gallery in 2011 featuring Urban's calendar project Limited Possession; Recalling Belvedere produced by UK gallery Art Gene in 2004; This is not a hat at Museum Van Nagsael, Rotterdam, in 2003; and Gambler at Or Gallery Vancouver in 1986. Museum London held a retrospective exhibition and published a catalogue raisonné of Urban's work, both titled "Incognito", in October 2013.

The first posthumous retrospective of Urban's body of work created in McIvers was exhibited at The Rooms in St. John's, titled At Full Tilt: Colette Urban in Western Newfoundland. The exhibit was curated by Matthew Hills of the Grenfell Art Gallery, and included documentation of her performances, sculpture, and photography.

=== Pretend Not To See Me ===
A documentary of her life and work in Western Newfoundland, Pretend Not To See Me, was released in 2010. The film was directed by Katherine Knight and produced by Site Media.

=== Gambler ===
Gambler is an interactive performance and installation created in 1986. The piece consists of an 6'" industrial work table on which is placed thousands of puzzles pieces, viewers are invited to sort and construct puzzles. A recording of a bingo hall also accompanies the table.

=== Pin-Up ===
Pin-Up was an exhibition presented by the grunt gallery that featured Urban's digital and performance skills, specifically her performance Limited Possession and HOOT which was documented at Full Tilt Creative Centre for the purposes of the installation.

=== Incognito ===
Before her death in June 2013, Urban was involved in planning a retrospective exhibition of her work to be held at Museum London. The exhibition, entitled "Incognito", would ultimately open in October 2013.

== Collections on Display ==
- Art Bank of Newfoundland & Labrador, St. John's, NL
- Art Gallery of Windsor, Windsor, ON
- Canada Council Art Bank, Ottawa, ON
- Museum London, London, ON
- Surrey Art Gallery, Surrey, BC
- The Rooms Art Gallery, St. John's, NL
- University of Lethbridge Art Gallery, Lethbridge, AB
- Walter Phillips Gallery, The Banff Centre

== Honors and recognition ==
Urban was inducted into the Royal Canadian Academy of Arts in 2012. In 2013, just prior to her death, she was awarded the Excellence in Visual Arts Long Haul Award from the VANL-CARFAC, Newfoundland and Labrador's visual artists' association, recognizing Urban's contributions to visual arts in the province.
