= LNG Canada =

Industrial energy project in Kitimat, BC, Canada

Coordinates: 54°01′24″N 128°41′01″W

LNG Canada Development Inc.
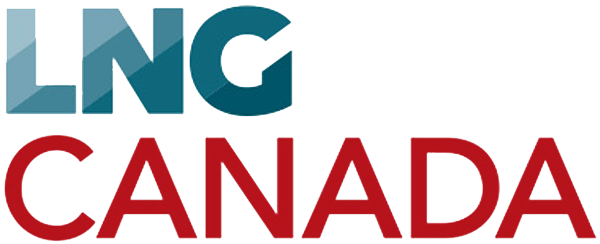
- Type: Joint venture
- Founded: 24 November 2011
- Headquarters: Shell Centre, Calgary, Alberta
- Key people: Chris Cooper (president)
- Owner: Shell (40%); Petronas (25%); PetroChina (15%); Mitsubishi Corporation (15%); Korea Gas (5%)
- Website: Official website

LNG Canada Development Inc. is an industrial joint venture established to construct a liquefied natural gas (LNG) export terminal in Kitimat, British Columbia, Canada. The consortium is led by Shell and also includes Petronas, PetroChina, Mitsubishi Corporation, and Korea Gas. The Kitimat terminal exports LNG produced in the Montney Formation near Dawson Creek, B.C., by the project's partners.

== Outline of the project ==
The total investment, estimated at $40 billion, was approved on October 1, 2018, by the shareholders of the project, which are subsidiaries of five international companies: Shell Plc. (40%, lead partner), of the UK and Netherlands; Petronas (25%), of Malaysia; PetroChina Co. Ltd. (15%), of China; Mitsubishi Corp. (15%), of Japan; and Korea Gas Corporation (5%) of Korea.

The project will initially export LNG from two processing units, or "trains," totaling 14 million tonnes per year (mtpa) of natural gas, and that, ultimately, the project may add two more trains and increase total production to 26 mtpa.

The Final Investment Decision for the LNG Canada project has been considered a significant step not only for Canada's energy industry but also for the global LNG industry, as natural gas, including its liquefied form, is being used more and more extensively to fuel power plants, petrochemical plants and natural gas distribution pipelines to homes and offices, as well as to fuel various transport modes such as ocean shipping.

When completed, LNG Canada will likely be the first Canadian terminal to export LNG overseas, whereas several LNG liquefaction and export terminals are already operating on the Gulf and Atlantic coasts of the United States, with others being planned, including on the US west coast (see List of LNG terminals).

Within ten days of the announcement of the investment decision, two Japanese gas utilities, Toho Gas and Tokyo Gas, signed heads of agreement for LNG purchasing contracts over 15 and 13 years, respectively, with a subsidiary of one of the LNG Canada partners and shareholders, i.e. Mitsubishi.

The scope of the facility includes:

- LNG processing units
- Storage tanks
- LNG loading lines
- Marine terminal
- Rail yard
- Water treatment facility
- Flare stacks
- Workforce accommodation

On 2026 September 29, Shell announced a plan to double the capacity of the export terminal to 28 million tonnes per annum.

== Construction ==
The partners and their engineering and construction contractors aim to open the LNG Canada project by 2025, barring engineering, construction, environmental or regulatory obstacles. The engineering and overall supervision of the construction of the project has been awarded to a joint venture of two large engineering companies, JGC of Japan and Fluor Corporation of the US, operating as JGC Fluor aka JFJV.

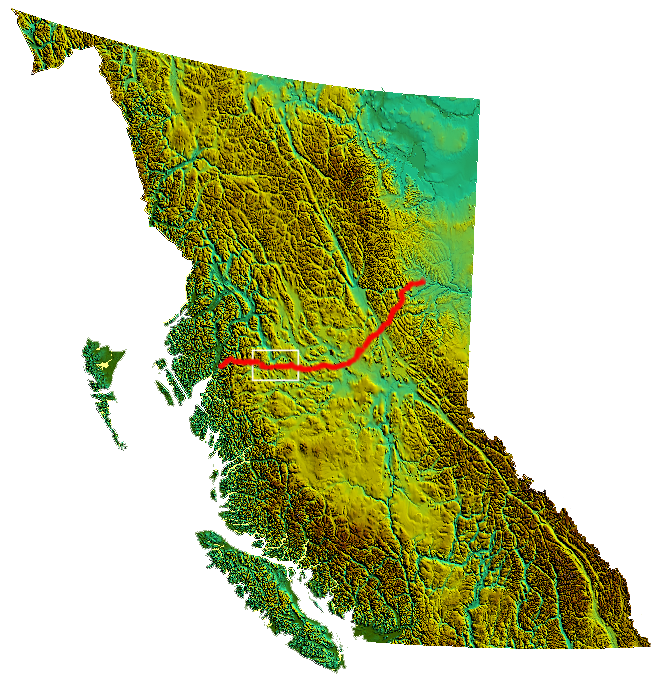
Coastal GasLink Pipeline

The first phase of the project includes a $6.2 billion Coastal GasLink Pipeline through northern British Columbia, which will be built and operated by TC Energy (formerly TransCanada Corporation). Coastal GasLink will be a 670-kilometre (420 mi) gas pipeline with an initial capacity of about 2.1 billion cubic feet per day (Bcf/day) with the potential for expansion of up to approximately 5 Bcf/day. Construction activities began in early 2019 with a planned in-service date in 2023. The pipeline project is backed by 25-year transportation service agreements between TC Energy and the LNG Canada partners.

The second phase is the construction of an $18 billion gas liquefaction and storage plant in the port of Kitimat, B.C., with two liquefaction "trains" where the natural gas will be cooled to reach its liquid state, then be stored waiting for ships to transport it to Asian markets.

A new terminal for LNG carrier ships will be built at the port of Kitimat, connected to the LNG Canada liquefaction and storage plant.

LNG carrier ships will sail up and down the Douglas Channel, to and from the port of Kitimat, to load LNG and sail to overseas destinations, mainly in Asia. Such ships may be owned and operated by some of the LNG Canada partners, or by their LNG purchasing clients, or they may be time-chartered from specialized independent ship owners and operators of such specialized ships.

A potential controversy in connection with this large construction project is the level of customs duties that will be applied by Canada on any import of foreign manufactured steel modules, especially from China.

== Operation ==
The plant produced its first LNG and shipped its first cargo in June 2025, and had shipped over 20 cargoes when the second train started operating in November 2025. On February 23, 2026, LNG Canada had shipped 50 cargoes to their customers.

== Environmental impact ==
As for any energy mining, transportation, storage and export project of this magnitude, there are numerous potential impacts on the atmosphere, on land, and at sea, which have started to be debated both within Kitimat and British Columbia, as well as in Canada at large. The LNG project is set to be the largest point source of pollution in British Columbia, and, according to The Narwhal, the first phase of the project will emit four megatonnes of greenhouse gas (GHG) emissions annually, equivalent to putting 856,531 cars on the road. The additional pollution is expected to make it much more difficult for British Columbia to meet its legislated targets for greenhouse gas reduction.

Through a combination of energy efficient natural gas turbines and renewable electricity from BC Hydro, the project is expected to emit less than half the GHG emissions of the average LNG facility currently in operation worldwide, and is being called "best in class". As reported by JWN Energy: "Canadian LNG operations will be well below the global emissions average of 0.26 to 0.35 tonnes of CO_{2} equivalent per tonne of LNG produced. LNG Canada, currently under construction at Kitimat, B.C., is being designed for 0.15 tonnes of CO_{2} equivalent per tonne per tonne of LNG."

LNG Canada received its Environmental Assessment Certificate in June 2015 following three years of community consultation and studies. LNG Canada is required to monitor and report the local effects of its activities over the life of the project.

== Economic impact ==
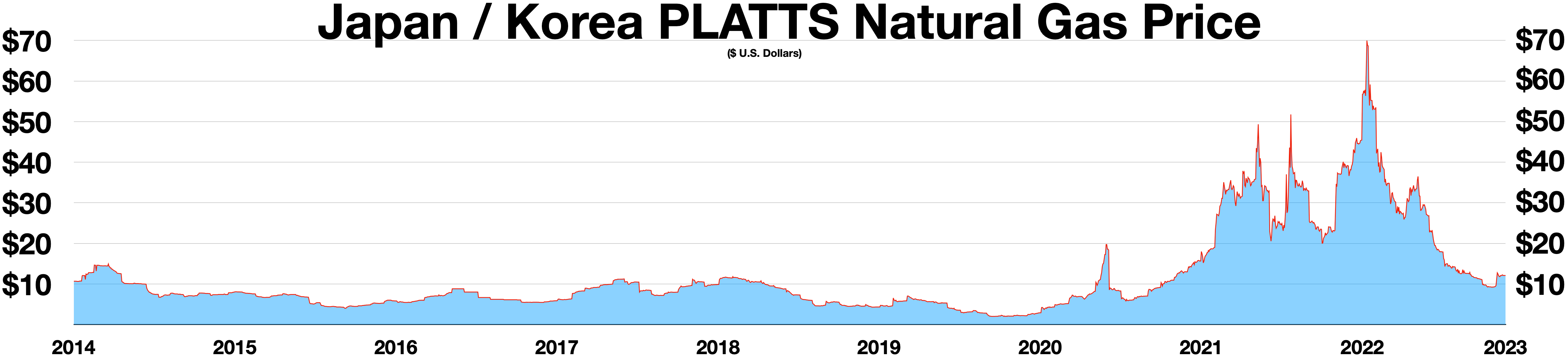
Japan / Korea PLATTS LNG price

The provincial government argues that the project will bring in C$23 billion in new government revenues. However, the LNG Canada project is the recipient of tax incentives. The British Columbian government, led by John Horgan, offered the project a break on the British Columbia carbon tax, as well as the provincial sales tax. The total subsidies for the project are valued at $5.35 billion. The subsidies extend beyond the natural gas plant itself, to new transmission lines that are being built by BC Hydro to service the gas fields where the gas will be extracted. These transmission lines have a cost of $296 million. The LNG project is slated to be a major recipient of electricity from the Site C dam, which cost more than $10.7 billion to build and has experienced several cost overruns.

LNG Canada has stated its commitment to a "hire local first" approach and will work to ensure local residents have opportunities to become qualified to benefit from the B.C. LNG industry through training programs, direct employment, contracting and purchasing of goods and services from BC and Canadian companies. As of November 2019, $1 billion in contracts and procurement have gone to B.C. companies, more than half of which — $558 million — has gone to firms and First Nations in the immediate Kitimat region. A number of firms directly or indirectly working on the LNG Canada project have partnered with First Nations in the area, notably the Haisla Nation. These figures do not include the additional employment and business generated by the construction and operation of the Coastal GasLink project, which will deliver natural gas to the LNG facility.
