= Yintah =

2024 Canadian documentary film

- Theatrical release poster
- Directed by: Jennifer Wickham; Brenda Michell; Michael Toledano
- Produced by: Brenda Michell; Bob Moore; Michael Toledano; Jennifer Wickham
- Starring: Freda Huson; Molly Wickham
- Cinematography: Michael Toledano
- Edited by: Ryan Mullins
- Music by: Olivier Alary
- Production company: Yintah Film
- Distributed by: EyeSteelFilm
- Release date: March 1, 2024 (True/False)
- Running time: 125 minutes
- Country: Canada
- Language: English

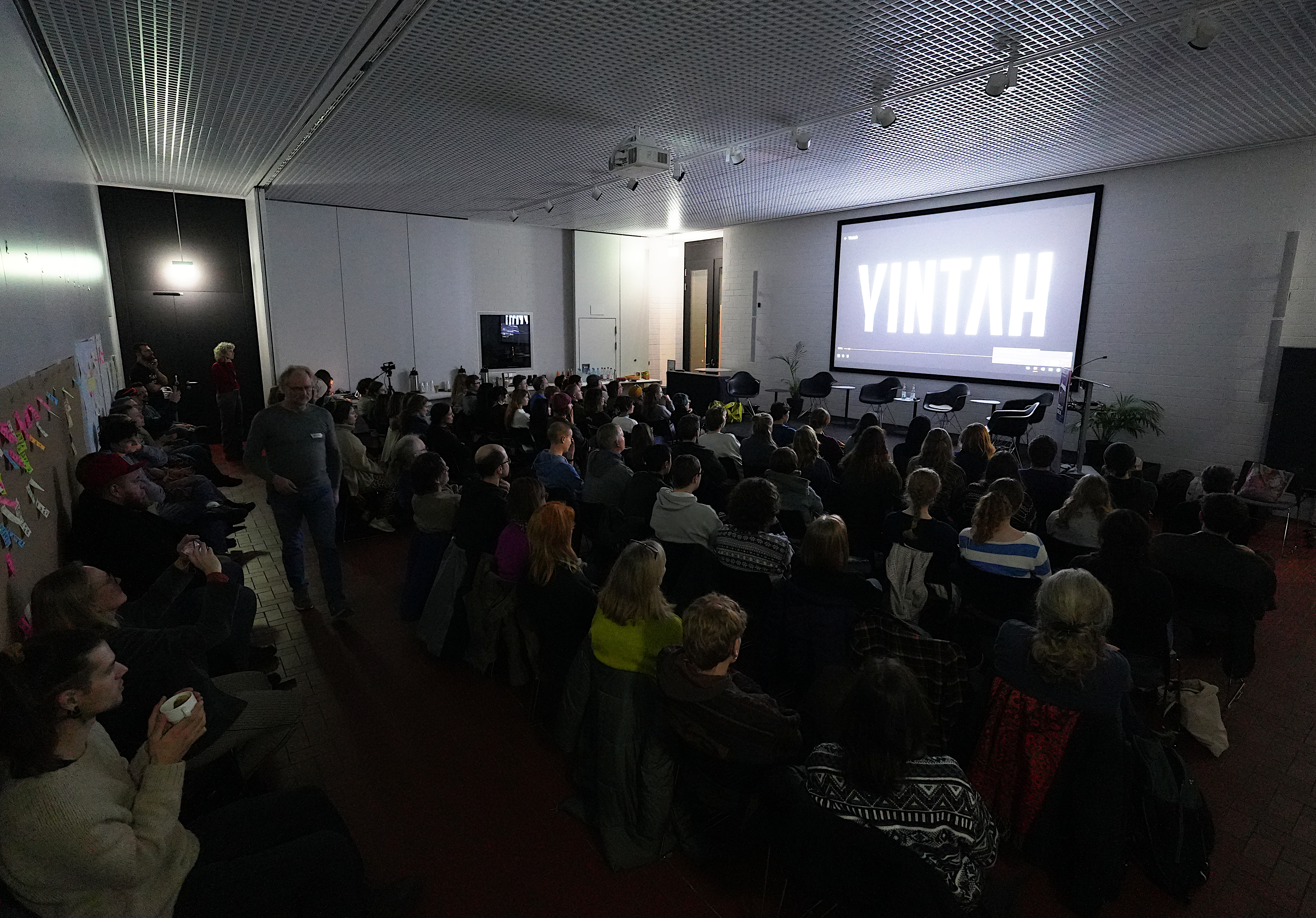
A screening of Yintah to about 80 climate activists in Berlin in late‑2024

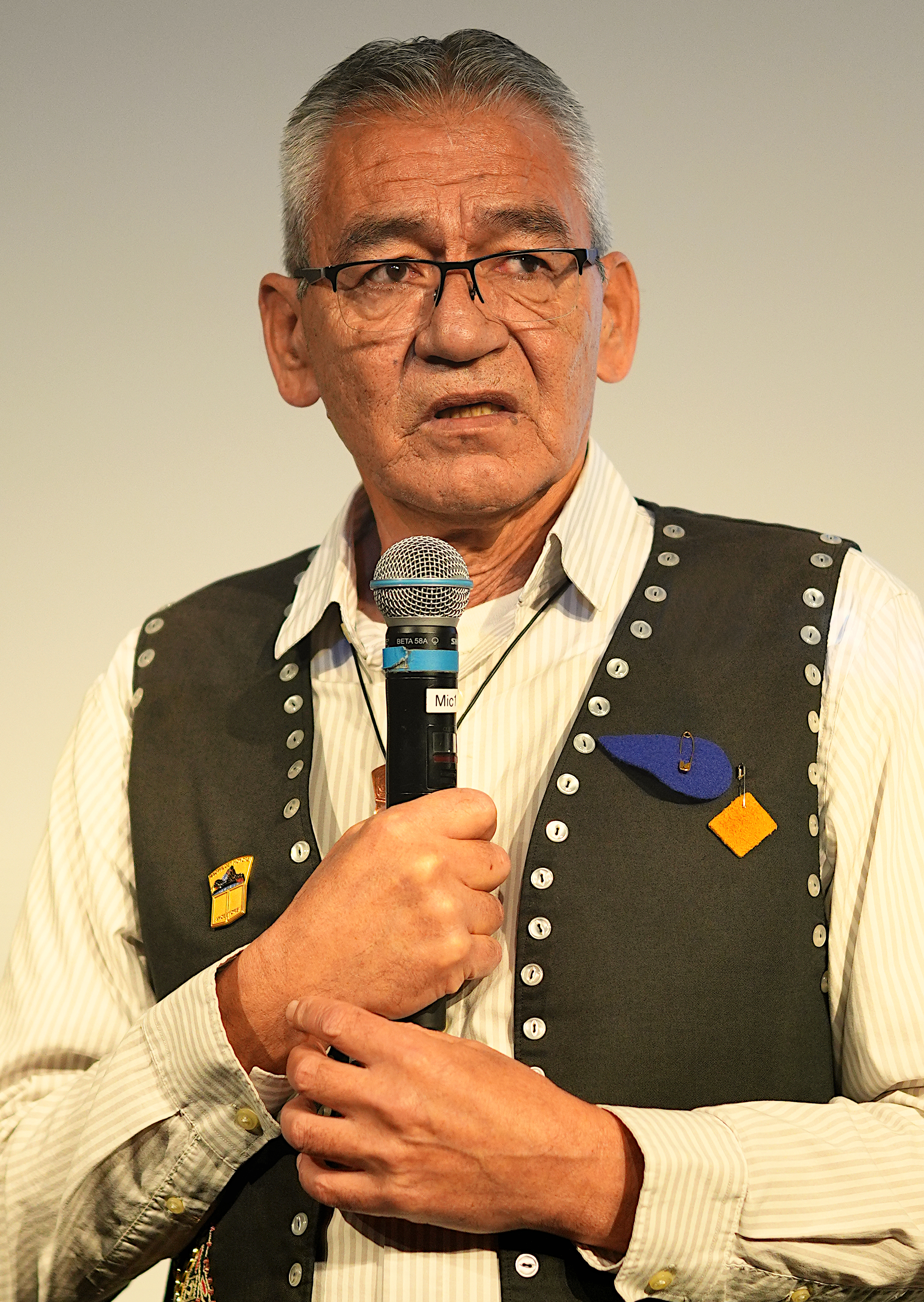
Hereditary Chief Na’Moks of the Wet’suwet’en Nation introduces the documentary film Yintah at a screening in Berlin on 9 December 2024

Yintah is a 2024 Canadian documentary film, directed by Jennifer Wickham, Brenda Michell and Michael Toledano. The film profiles the Wetʼsuwetʼen First Nation, as they fight to protect their traditional lands from natural gas pipeline developments.

The film premiered in March 2024 at the True/False Film Festival. It had its Canadian premiere at the Hot Docs Canadian International Documentary Festival.

== Awards ==
Award	Date of ceremony	Category	Recipient(s)	Result	Ref.
Hot Docs Canadian International Documentary Festival	2024	Rogers Audience Award	Jennifer Wickham, Brenda Michell, Michael Toledano	Won	
DOXA Documentary Film Festival	2024	Colin Low Award	Jennifer Wickham, Brenda Michell, Michael Toledano	Honored	
DOXA Documentary Film Festival	2024	Elevate Award	Jennifer Wickham, Brenda Michell, Michael Toledano	Honored	
Toronto Film Critics Association	2024	Rogers Best Canadian Documentary Award	Jennifer Wickham, Brenda Michell, Michael Toledano	Nominated	
Millennium Docs Against Gravity	May 15, 2025	Grand Prix Bank Millennium Award	Jennifer Wickham, Brenda Michell, Michael Toledano	Won	
Canadian Screen Awards	June 1, 2025	Best Feature Length Documentary	Jennifer Wickham, Brenda Michell, Michael Toledano, Bob Moore, Sam Vinal, Doris Rosso, Daniel Cross, Mila Aung-Thwin	Won	
Canadian Screen Awards	June 1, 2025	Best Cinematography in a Documentary	Michael Toledano	Won	
Canadian Screen Awards	June 1, 2025	Best Original Music in a Documentary	Olivier Alary, Johannes Malfatti	Nominated	
Canadian Screen Awards	June 1, 2025	Best Sound Design in a Documentary	Benoît Dame, Catherine Van Der Donckt	Nominated	

== See also ==
- 2020 Canadian pipeline and railway protests
- Killing of Jared Lowndes
- Sleydo' Molly Wickham
