= Cody Westman =

Canadian filmmaker and musician

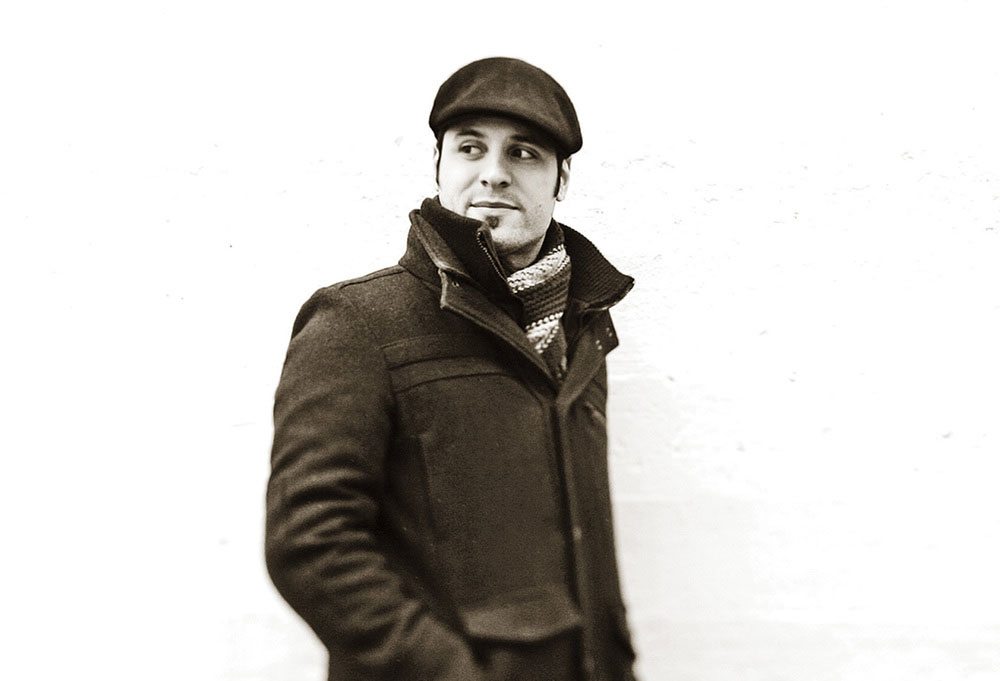
- Born: October 20, 1978 (age 48); Smithers, British Columbia, Canada
- Education: Selkirk College
- Occupation: Filmmaker/Musician
- Spouse: Nancy Westman (married 2009)
- Children: 2
- Website: catseyecinema.com

Cody Westman is a Canadian filmmaker/musician from Smithers, British Columbia now residing in St. John's, Newfoundland and Labrador. He is known for his filmmaking as well as his solo music career and his work with rock band, Man The Animal. He owns and operates his production company Cats Eye Cinema INC which focuses on documentaries, commercials, corporate video, music videos and short films.

== Career ==
=== Filmmaking ===
Westman's first film project was a documentary about the first Irish Pub in Newfoundland entitled That Little Room: The Story of Erin's Pub, which told the history of Newfoundland bands Sons of Erin, Shanneyganock and Great Big Sea. The film premiered on NTV, was shown on all Air Canada flights in 2014 and was screened at the Nickel Film Festival in St. John's, NL and the Kerry Film Festival in Killarney, Ireland. He focuses on documentaries, commercials, corporate video, music videos and short films.

Cody went on to direct two short films (fiction) in 2017, It Could Be You and Casey. In 2018, Casey was selected to be featured as part of Telefilm's Not Short On Talent event at the Festival De Cannes in France.

His 2021 documentary film Hell or Clean Water was one of the winners of the Rogers Audience Award at the 2021 Hot Docs Canadian International Documentary Festival.

=== Music ===
Westman began playing music at age 11, studied performance and recording at Selkirk College in Nelson, British Columbia (1996-1999). He has released three solo albums and one EP with his band Man The Animal in St. John's, NL. Cody shared the bill with many acts including Leon Russell, Shaun Verreault, Blue Rodeo, Steven Page, Blackie and the Rodeo Kings and Alex Cuba.

== Filmography ==
- That LITTLE Room - The Story Of Erin's Pub (2014)
- Deadline (2015)
- It Could Be You (2017)
- Casey (2017)
- Hell or Clean Water (2021)

== Music videos ==
- "Psychobilly Love Song" by Man the Animal (2012)
- "Thought Police" by The Town Heroes (2016)
- "First Light" by Waterfront Fire (2016)

== Discography ==
- Just Like That (2005, Cody Westman)
- Lean In EP (2006, by Cody Westman and High Society)
- I am Cody Westman (2010, Cody Westman)
- We Fall Down EP (2012, Man The Animal)
