= Hell or Clean Water =

2021 Canadian documentary film

- Directed by: Cody Westman
- Written by: Cody Westman
- Produced by: Jennifer Hawley
- Starring: Shawn Bath
- Cinematography: Troy Maher
- Edited by: Justin Simms
- Production company: Little Heat Films
- Release date: April 29, 2021 (Hot Docs)
- Running time: 88 minutes
- Country: Canada
- Language: English

Hell or Clean Water is a 2021 Canadian documentary film, directed by Cody Westman. The film centres on Shawn Bath, a diver in Newfoundland and Labrador who has organized the Clean Harbours Initiative to clean up garbage on the ocean floor.

The film premiered at the 2021 Hot Docs Canadian International Documentary Festival, where it was named one of five winners of the Rogers Audience Award.
