= Katherine Knight (artist) =

Canadian artist and filmmaker (born 1955)

- Born: 1955; Ottawa, Ontario
- Known for: artist, filmmaker, educator

Katherine Knight RCA (born 1955) is a Canadian artist and documentary film director whose artistic practice considers the relationships between landscape and personal experiences of time and place. In addition to her artistic practice, Katherine Knight teaches in the Visual Art Department at York University.

== Biography ==
Knight was born in Ottawa, Ontario. Knight completed at Bachelor of Fine Arts at the Nova Scotia College of Art and Design in 1980 and a Master of Fine Arts at the University of Victoria in 1984.

In 2006, Katherine Knight and David Craig founded Site Media Inc, which has produced several documentaries about notable Canadian artists such as Annie Pootoogook, Wanda Koop (KOOP: The Art of Wanda Koop), Spring Hurlbut and Arnaud Maggs (Spring & Arnaud), and Colette Urban (Pretend Not to See Me). In 2021 she released the documentary film Still Max, a documentary film about artist Max Dean which was one of the Rogers Audience Award winners at the 2021 Hot Docs Canadian International Documentary Festival. Her works are included in many public collections, including the National Gallery of Canada, the Canadian Museum of Contemporary Photography, Banff Centre for the Arts and The Canada Council Art Bank.
