= Still Max =

2021 Canadian documentary film

- Directed by: Katherine Knight
- Produced by: Katherine Knight
- Starring: Max Dean
- Cinematography: John Price
- Edited by: Sabrina Budiman; Anthony Von Seck
- Music by: Osama Shalabi
- Production company: Site Media
- Release date: April 29, 2021 (Hot Docs)
- Running time: 79 minutes
- Country: Canada
- Language: English

Still Max is a Canadian documentary film, directed by Katherine Knight and released in 2021. The film is a portrait of Canadian multidisciplinary artist Max Dean, and his recent projects using art to confront his battle with prostate cancer.

The film premiered at the 2021 Hot Docs Canadian International Documentary Festival, where it was named one of five winners of the Rogers Audience Award.
