= Elizabeth Vibert =

Elizabeth Vibert is a Canadian historian and documentary filmmaker. She is most noted for her 2025 film Aisha's Story , which won the Audience Award for Mid-Length Films at the 2025 Hot Docs Canadian International Documentary Festival.

A history professor at the University of Victoria, she was the winner of the Albert B. Corey Prize from the American Historical Association and Canadian Historical Association in 1999 for her book Traders' Tales: Narratives of Cultural Encounters in the Columbia Plateau, 1807-46. She is co-editor of the anthologies Reading Beyond Words: Contexts for Native History (1997; 2003) and Out There Learning: Critical Reflections on Off-Campus Study Programs (2019), and has published in Gender and History, Ethnohistory, Contemporary African Studies, and other journals, collections, and media outlets.

She made her debut as a filmmaker with The Thinking Garden, with director Christine Welsh, in 2017.
