= Unbranded =

- Film poster
- Directed by: Phillip Baribeau
- Produced by: Dennis Aig
- Cinematography: Phillip Baribeau
- Edited by: Scott Chestnut
- Music by: Noah Sorota
- Distributed by: Gravitas Ventures
- Release date: April 25, 2015
- Running time: 106 minutes
- Country: United States
- Language: English

Unbranded is a 2015 American documentary film directed by Phillip Baribeau. It follows four Texas A&M graduates setting out to ride sixteen mustangs from Mexico to Canada in order to raise awareness about issues surrounding wild horses and their management by the United States Bureau of Land Management.

== Reception ==
The New York Times's Daniel M. Gold praised the film's "stirring vistas of the backcountry West, and admiration — for the Aggies' achievement, Mr. Masters's imagination and Mr. Baribeau's skill in chronicling it all". The Los Angeles Times film critic Sheri Linden said the film is "brimming with drama in the midst of jaw-dropping landscapes".
