= Jason Loftus =

Canadian documentary filmmaker

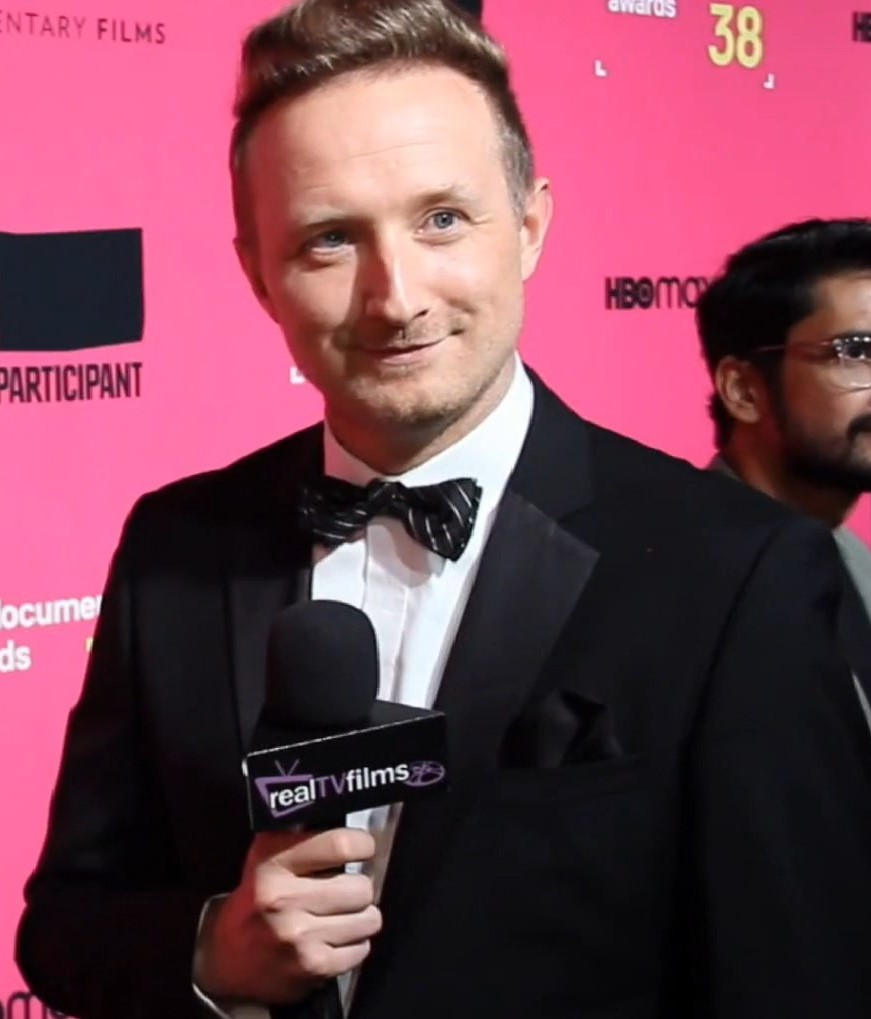
Loftus interviewed in 2022

Jason Loftus is a Canadian documentary filmmaker. He is most noted as the director of the documentary film Eternal Spring, which was selected as Canada's submission for the Academy Award for Best International Feature Film at the 95th Academy Awards.

The CEO of Lofty Sky Entertainment was executive producer of the 2014 documentary film Human Harvest, a Peabody Award recipient for Documentary Programming in 2015 and a Donald Brittain Award nominee at the 4th Canadian Screen Awards in 2016.

Ask No Questions, his debut film as a director, premiered at the Slamdance Film Festival in 2020. With film distribution in 2020 impeded primarily by the COVID-19 pandemic, the film subsequently partnered with the San Francisco DocFest to screen the film in a virtual reality environment.

Eternal Spring, an animated documentary created in collaboration with Chinese animator and activist Daxiong, was released in 2022. When it screened at the Hot Docs Canadian International Documentary Festival, it was named the overall winner of the Hot Docs Audience Award for most popular film in the festival, and the first-place winner of the Rogers Audience Award for the most popular Canadian film.
