= Pernille Rose Grønkjær =

Danish film director (born 1973)

Pernille Rose Grønkjær (born in 1973) is a Danish film director.

Grønkjær was born in Denmark and graduated from the National Film School of Denmark in 1997. She is the director of various documentary films for the screen and for television including Min morfar forfra, Repeating Grandpa (selected for Input 2002 at Rotterdam), and The Monastery: Mr. Vig and the Nun, winner of the Joris Ivens competition at IDFA 2006.
