= Max Dean (artist) =

Canadian multidisciplinary artist

- Born: June 29, 1949 (age 77); Leeds, England
- Occupation: Artist
- Notable work: The Table: Childhood; Robotic Chair

Max Dean (born June 29, 1949) is a Canadian multidisciplinary artist.

== Life ==
Dean was born June 29, 1949, in Leeds, England. He immigrated to Canada with his family in 1952, settling in Vancouver.

== Work ==
In the late 1970s and 1980s, Dean did multimedia performances involving his body in conjunction with sound, photography and other media. Dean's Telephone Project (1982) was an installation that allowed up to 16 persons to talk on a telephone line.

Since the 1980s, Dean has become known for his installations that use robotics and electronics to achieve artistic effects. His work As Yet Untitled (1992–1995) involves a robotic arm that presents generic family photos to the viewer, who must act to prevent the photo from being immediately shredded. The piece received extensive press and critical coverage and was acquired by the Art Gallery of Ontario.

Dean has collaborated extensively with Cornell University professor of mechanical and aerospace engineering Raffaello D'Andrea. Between 2003 and 2006 they collaborated with Canadian artist Matt Donovan to create the installation work Robotic Chair, a chair that falls apart and puts itself back together again without human intervention. Dean also collaborated with D'Andrea on the work The Table: Childhood, which was included in the Arsenale section of the 2001 Venice Biennale.

He is the subject of Katherine Knight's 2021 documentary film Still Max. In 2022, the Portrait Gallery of Canada organized Max Dean: Portrait of the Artist as Artist, an online exhibition curated by Ann Thomas as guest curator.

== Collections ==
Dean's work is included in several museum collections, including the National Gallery of Canada and the Vancouver Art Gallery. His piece As Yet Untitled is part of the permanent collection of the Art Gallery of Ontario.

== Awards ==
In 1997, Dean received the Jean A. Chalmers National Visual Arts Award from the Ontario Arts Council. In 2005, Dean received the Gershon Iskowitz prize from the Art Gallery of Ontario. In 2014, he was a recipient of the Governor General's Awards in Visual and Media Arts.
