= Jennifer Wickham =

Canadian documentary filmmaker

Jennifer Wickham is a Canadian documentary filmmaker, most noted as co-director with Michael Toledano and Brenda Michell of the 2024 documentary film Yintah. The film won the Canadian Screen Award for Best Feature Length Documentary at the 13th Canadian Screen Awards in 2025.

She is the sister of Sleydo' Molly Wickham, a prominent Wetʼsuwetʼen activist who was one of the key figures profiled in Yintah.
