= Brenda Michell =

Canadian documentary filmmaker

Brenda Michell is a Canadian documentary filmmaker, most noted as co-director with Michael Toledano and Jennifer Wickham of the 2024 documentary film Yintah. The film won the Canadian Screen Award for Best Feature Length Documentary at the 13th Canadian Screen Awards in 2025.
