= Michael Toledano =

Canadian documentary filmmaker

Michael Toledano is a Canadian documentary filmmaker, most noted as co-director with Jennifer Wickham and Brenda Michell of the 2024 documentary film Yintah. The film won the Canadian Screen Award for Best Feature Length Documentary, and Toledano won the award for Best Cinematography in a Documentary, at the 13th Canadian Screen Awards in 2025.

During production of the film, Toledano, who is Jewish, was arrested and detained by the Royal Canadian Mounted Police in 2021. The charges against him were later dropped as he had not actually committed any crime.

Toledano and Sam Vinal, who was also an executive producer on Yintah, previously co-directed the short documentary film Invasion: The Unist'ot'en's Fight for Sovereignty in 2020.
