= Cheslatta River =

- Etymology: Dakelh word meaning either "top of small mountain" or "small rock mountain at east side".

Location
- Country: Canada
- Province: British Columbia
- District: Range 4 Coast Land District

Physical characteristics
- Source: Skins Lake
  - coordinates: 53°46′43″N 125°57′28″W
  - elevation: 830 m (2,720 ft)
- Mouth: Nechako River
  - coordinates: 53°38′43″N 124°56′13″W
  - elevation: 717 m (2,352 ft)
- Discharge
  - location: below Cheslatta Falls
  - average: 72.2 m^{3}/s (2,550 cu ft/s)
  - minimum: 26.6 m^{3}/s (940 cu ft/s)
  - maximum: 465 m^{3}/s (16,400 cu ft/s)

The Cheslatta River is a tributary of the Nechako River, one of the main tributaries of the Fraser River, in the Canadian province of British Columbia. It flows through the Nechako Plateau. Before the construction of Kenney Dam in the early 1950s the Cheslatta was a minor tributary of the Nechako. Today the Nechako River is dry above the Cheslatta, which provides all its source water.

The name "Cheslatta" comes from a Dakelh word meaning either "top of small mountain" or "small rock mountain at east side".

== Course ==
Before the Nechako Reservoir was created in the early 1950s the Cheslatta River began north of Ootsa Lake. After the Kenney Dam was built, Ootsa Lake merged with many other lakes, forming the Nechako Reservoir. Skins Lake, a small lake just north of Ootsa Lake near the original headwaters of the Cheslatta River, was also joined to the Nechako Reservoir. At Skins Lake the reservoir's spillway was built, allowing excess water to be released into the Cheslatta River. Today Skins Lake is considered the source of the Cheslatta River. From there the Cheslatta flows generally east and a little south. Moxley Creek and Dog Creek join from the north, after which the river widens into the long but relatively narrow Cheslatta Lake. Knapp Creek empties into Cheslatta Lake from the north. After Cheslatta Lake the river flows a short distance before widening into Murray Lake. Bird Creek joins from the west. After Murray Lake the river flows a few kilometres to its confluence with the Nechako River. The Cheslatta cascades overs Cheslatta Falls just before joining the Nechako. Numerous small tributary streams join the Cheslatta River along its course.

== Discharge ==
Originally the Cheslatta River was small, with an average annual flow of about 5 cubic metres per second (180 cu ft/s). After the Nechako Reservoir was filled its level has been controlled by releasing water into the Cheslatta River via the Skins Lake Spillway. These releases average 94.7 cubic metres per second (3,340 cu ft/s), ranging from no flow to a 2007 release and flood of 600 cubic metres per second (21,000 cu ft/s). Flows above 400 cubic metres per second (14,000 cu ft/s) are not uncommon, and four times flows have exceeded 500 cubic metres per second (18,000 cu ft/s).

== History ==
Although it follows smaller, pre-existing watercourses, the modern Cheslatta River has existed only since the 1950s. Before the Nechako Reservoir was created, the river's course was a small, meandering stream through swamps and meadows north and east of Ootsa Lake. Its lower reaches were called Murray Creek.

The river has been greatly altered as a result of the Kemano Power Project, which diverts water from the Nechako River basin to the Pacific Ocean in order to provide power for an Alcan aluminium smelter in Kitimat. In the early 1950s Kenney Dam was built on the Nechako River a short distance upriver from the Cheslatta–Nechako confluence, creating the Nechako Reservoir. A 10-mile (16 km) long tunnel was blasted through the Coast Mountains, connecting the Nechako Reservoir to a hydroelectric powerhouse at Kemano. Transmission lines were built to carry the electricity 82 kilometres (51 mi) to the Alcan company town of Kitimat, which was also built in the 1950s. In 2007 Alcan was bought by Rio Tinto Alcan, which runs the Kemano Power Project today.

When Kenney Dam was built in the early 1950s there were about 200 Cheslatta T'en living in four villages and 17 Indian reserves along the Cheslatta River and Cheslatta Lake. In 1953 these indigenous people had to move away and surrender 1,053 hectares (2,600 acres) of land. They were relocated to Grassy Plains, 48 kilometres (30 mi) away. Aside from losing their traditional village sites and trapping territory, three of the Cheslatta T'en's graveyards were washed away by outflow from the new reservoir. The Cheslatta say they were promised that any graves that would be flooded would be moved to higher ground, while Alcan says the Cheslatta understood and agreed to the flooding of the graves in Reserves 5 and 7, provided two recent graves were moved. Alcan thought the graveyard at Reserve 9 was above the flood level, but when water was first released from Nechako Reservoir in 1957 it swept through the Reserve 9 graveyard and washed many graves away. The Cheslatta say that coffins and human remains were found in and around Cheslatta Lake during the summer of 1957, and that the three graveyards have continued to be flooded at least twice a year since the Skins Lake spillway began operating. In 1992 the graveyard sites at Reserves 5 and 7 were reconsecrated, with new crosses and grave houses erected, as part of the Cheslatta redevelopment project. However, within a month, another discharge of water flooded the graveyards, washing the new grave houses and crosses into Cheslatta Lake.

Kenney Dam has no gates or spillways. It completely blocks the Nechako River, whose bed runs dry through the Nechako Canyon between Kenney Dam and the mouth of the Cheslatta River. A spillway for the Nechako Reservoir was built at Skins Lake, 75 km (47 mi) west of Kenney Dam. From Skins Lake excess water is released into the Cheslatta River. It took several years for the Nechako Reservoir to fill, during which time the Cheslatta River remained in its natural state. By 1957 the reservoir was full and Alcan began releasing large amounts of water into the Cheslatta River via the Skins Lake spillway.

Before 1957 the Cheslatta River was a small stream with an average annual flow of about 5 cubic metres per second (177 cu ft/s). Alcan began releasing water flows far above the Cheslatta's natural capacity, resulting in a deep channel being carved out and large-scale erosion filling the Cheslatta and upper Nechako Rivers with sediment. In addition, the area between the Skins Lake spillway and the headwaters of the Cheslatta River was not a river but rather a series of meadows, pastures, and small lakes. Water released from the reservoir scoured the area between Skins Lake and Cheslatta Lake. Soil, gravel, grass, moss, shrubs, and trees were washed away, down into the Cheslatta River and into the Nechako River.

In 1961 the Cheslatta's flow reached about 420 cubic metres per second (15,000 cu ft/s), causing the river to avulse and carve a new path, bypassing Cheslatta Falls. Enormous amounts of mud, silt, and debris were dumped into the Nechako River. The Cheslatta eventually returned to its original course over the falls, but in 1972 it again returned to the channel that had been cut around the falls in 1961, washing away an entire hill and filling the Nechako River with more debris and sediment. After the 1972 flood, Alcan built a coffer dam to prevent the river from taking the route around the falls again. About half of the sediment from the 1961 avulsion was deposited in a fan, called the Cheslatta Fan, on the former Nechako River bed, above Cheslatta Falls.

== Geology ==
The greatly increased flow and erosion along the Cheslatta River has resulted in unusually well-exposed late Quaternary and Holocene stratigraphy, which has been helpful to geologists trying to understand the region's geological history.

== See also ==
- List of tributaries of the Fraser River
- List of rivers of British Columbia
