= Franklin Matthias =

American nuclear engineer (1908–1993)

Franklin T. Matthias
- Born: 13 March 1908; Glidden, Wisconsin
- Died: 3 December 1993 (aged 85); Walnut Creek, California
- Education: University of Wisconsin, Madison (BS, MS)
- Military career
- Allegiance: United States
- Branch: United States Army
- Service years: 1941–1946
- Rank: Colonel
- Commands: Hanford Engineer Works
- Conflicts: World War II
- Awards: Army Distinguished Service Medal

Franklin Thompson Matthias (13 March 1908 – 3 December 1993) was an American civil engineer who directed the construction of the Hanford nuclear site, a key facility of the Manhattan Project during World War II.

A graduate of the University of Wisconsin–Madison, Matthias joined the Tennessee Valley Authority (TVA) as a Junior Hydraulic Engineer in 1935 and worked on hydroelectric projects. In April 1941, he was called to active duty by the United States Army and joined the Construction Division of the Army Corps of Engineers. He was area engineer at the Manhattan Project's Hanford site from 1942 to 1945. As such, he supervised the enormous construction effort, which included three chemical separation plants so large that they were known as "Queen Marys", and the world's first three production-scale nuclear reactors.

After the war, Matthais went to Brazil, where he helped build a hydroelectric facility. He joined the Aluminum Company of Canada (Alcan) in 1951, and was involved in the construction of its Kemano-Kitimat hydroelectric dam and aluminum smelter project in northern British Columbia and the Chute-des-Passes project in Quebec. He was a vice president at Kaiser Engineering from 1960 to 1973.

== Early life ==
Franklin Thompson Matthias was born in Glidden, Wisconsin, on 13 March 1908, the son of Franklin Herman Matthias and Christina Thompson. He had two older brothers, Harold and Norman, and a younger brother, Carl. Franklin grew up in Curtiss, WI and graduated in 1926 from Abbotsford High School. In 1928 he became an instructor in Topographical and Hydraulic Engineering at the University of Wisconsin–Madison, from which he received his Bachelor of Science (B.S.) degree in civil engineering in 1931, and his Master of Science (M.S.) degree in civil engineering in 1933. While there, he joined the Reserve Officers' Training Corps (ROTC). In 1930 and 1931, he was editor of the Wisconsin Engineer, and president of the university YMCA. He was a member of Tau Beta Pi, Phi Kappa Phi and Scabbard and Blade, and was a national officer of Chi Epsilon from 1931 to 1942.

On 1 August 1933, Matthias married Reva Baumgarten, a fellow graduate of the University of Wisconsin, who taught speech therapy in schools in Beloit, Wisconsin. In 1935, he was hired by the Tennessee Valley Authority (TVA) as a Junior Hydraulic Engineer, and worked on hydroelectric and hydraulic problems and on construction, planning and plant design. He left the TVA in 1939, and spent a year working with a contractor on dredging the Tennessee River. In 1940 and 1941, he worked for the A. L. Johnson Construction Company, and on tunnels and aqueducts for the Dravo Corporation.

== World War II ==
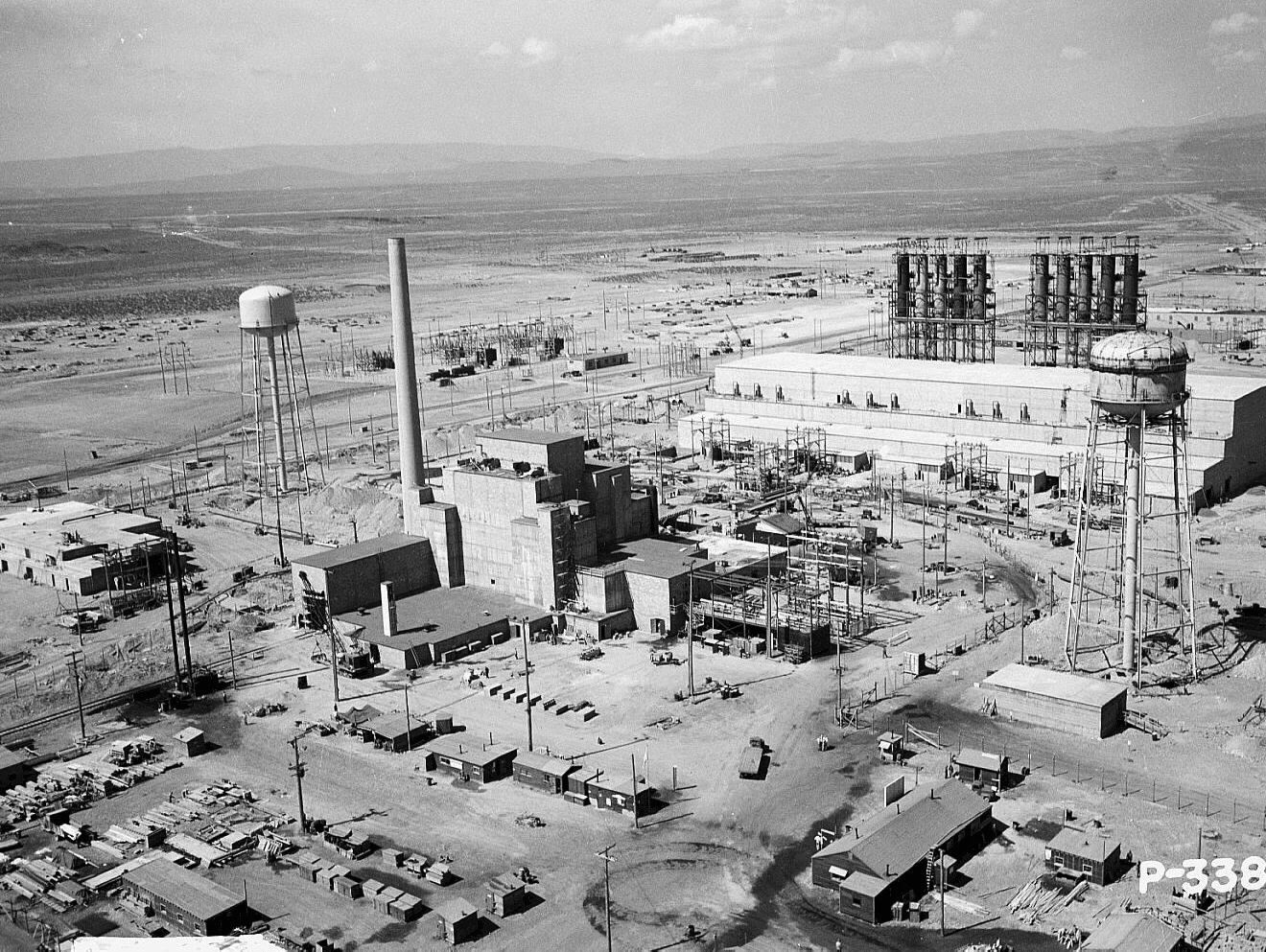
B Reactor in June 1944

In April 1941, Matthias was called to active duty by the United States Army as a first lieutenant, and joined the Construction Division of the Army Corps of Engineers, where he received rapid promotion. On 14 December 1942, as a 34-year-old lieutenant colonel, he accompanied Colonel Kenneth Nichols to Wilmington, Delaware, to discuss the location of a proposed plutonium production plant with representatives of DuPont. At this point, Matthias had not yet been assigned to the Manhattan Project, whose mission was to build an atomic bomb, but he had worked on some special studies for it, and had worked with its director, Brigadier General Leslie R. Groves, Jr., on the construction of The Pentagon. He was already Groves's choice for area engineer for the plutonium project.

Initially, the intention had been to locate the plutonium plant with the Manhattan Project's other production facilities at the Clinton Engineer Works in Oak Ridge, Tennessee, but concerns had arisen about the dangers of an atomic explosion, and Knoxville lay only 20 miles (32 km) away. A larger site was required where facilities could be separated from each other. It had to be in a sparsely populated but accessible area with access to abundant water and electric power. When he returned from the meeting, Matthias was met by Groves, who instructed him to take a survey team and find a suitable site. Matthias surveyed four sites in California and Washington, and chose the area around Richland, Washington.

Matthias later recalled that:

As far as my working relationship with Du Pont was concerned, of course, we had differences from day one. I was fortunate that Gil Church and Walt Simon (Du Pont's project construction manager and operations manager) were people I could deal with and respect, and we had a very good working relationship. I remember one time Granville Read (Du Pont's assistant chief engineer) called up Groves and said Matthias and Church were having a big argument about something and what should we do? Groves replied, "Well, if those two guys don't have some arguments, then neither of them are worth a damn."

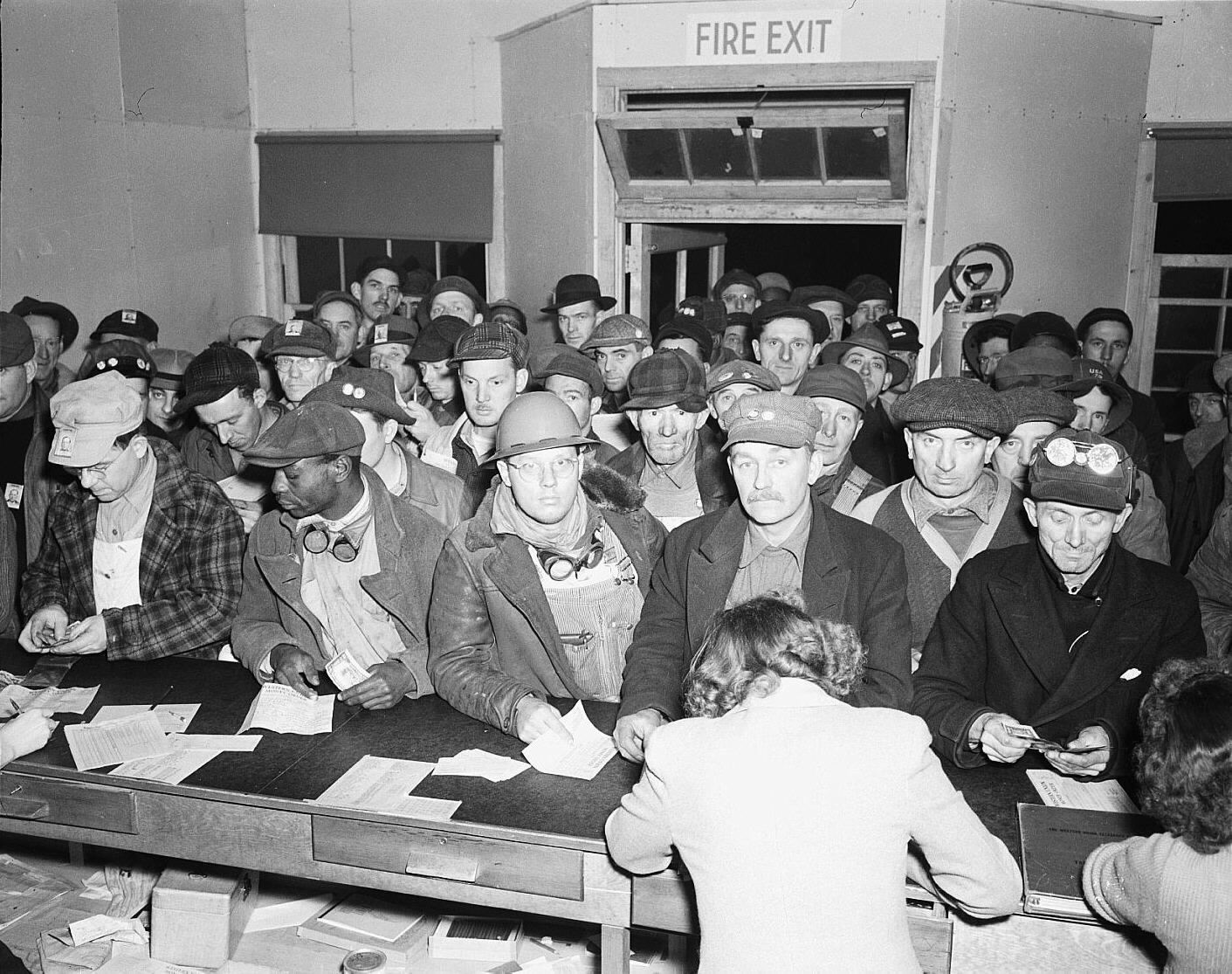
Hanford workers awaiting paychecks at the Western Union office

Because of the isolation of the site, known as the Hanford Engineer Works, Matthias exercised more administrative autonomy than the Manhattan Project's other area engineers. The number of personnel assigned to his office grew to over 500 in 1944. Construction work commenced on the 400,000-acre (160,000 ha) site in April 1943. The size of the construction work force eventually reached 44,900 in June 1944; over 150,000 workers were employed at the site between 1943 and 1946.

The scale of the task was enormous. Matthias supervised the construction of 554 buildings, 386 miles (621 km) of roads, 158 miles (254 km) of railroad track, three chemical separation plants and the world's first three production-scale nuclear reactors. The 800-foot-long (240 m) chemical separation plants, where the plutonium was separated from uranium slugs that had been irradiated in the reactors, were so large that they were known as "Queen Marys", after the ocean liner. Because the slugs were dangerously radioactive, the Queen Marys had concrete walls 7 feet (2.1 m) thick, and operations were by remote control.

In 1942 Matthias allowed about 30 Wanapum Native Americans to use their winter camp on the Columbia River with access to their customary fishing ground in the middle of the federal reservation, although white farmer families were being moved off it. Trucks were provided daily to move them from their winter camp. Mathias wrote that their loyalty could not be questioned. But after WWII, the tribe were totally excluded from the federal reservation (although it contained graves and cultural sites).

The first production batch of uranium slugs were dissolved at the separation plant on 26 December 1944, and in January 1945 Matthias personally couriered the first batch of plutonium nitrate to Los Angeles, where he handed it over to another courier, who took it to the Los Alamos Laboratory. Plutonium from Hanford would be used in the Fat Man bomb used in the bombing of Nagasaki. For his wartime services, he was awarded the Distinguished Service Medal.

== Later life ==
Matthias left the Army in 1946 and went to Brazil as a project manager for the construction for a hydroelectric facility, eventually becoming the Manager of Engineering at Brazilian Traction. Late in 1951 he joined the Aluminum Company of Canada (Alcan) as the Project Manager of Engineering and Construction of the Kemano-Kitimat hydroelectric dam and aluminum smelter project in northern British Columbia. In 1956 he moved to Montreal as its Director of Engineering, and worked on the Chute-des-Passes project. In 1960 he joined Kaiser Engineering in Oakland, California, as its Vice President for heavy construction and hydroelectric engineering, and was its Vice President of transportation projects from 1970 to 1973. He retired in 1973 at the age of 65.

Matthias was a Registered Professional Engineer in Wisconsin, California, Nebraska, Pennsylvania, and British Columbia. For some years after his retirement he remained active as a consultant, working for firms including Kaiser Engineering, Pacific Gas and Electric, Louisiana Pacific and Bechtel. He was a member of the Advisory Board of the California Water Resources Association, the Committee on Large Dams, Committee on Construction of Nuclear Facilities, and the American Society of Civil Engineers. He also wrote the chapter on "Construction Services" in the Handbook of Heavy Construction (1971).

In 1993, he was informed that he had cancer of the lungs, liver and pancreas. He died six week later, on 3 December 1993, at a nursing home in Walnut Creek, California. He was survived by his son Michael and younger brother Carl. His second wife, Mary Teresa Benderska, whom he had married on 29 October 1948, had died in 1986, and his daughter Gelen Christine had died in 1965. His papers are in the Hagley Museum and Library in Wilmington, Delaware.
