= Nechako Canyon Protected Area =

Provincial park in the Regional District of Bulkley-Nechako, British Columbia

- IUCN category III (natural monument or feature)
- Location within British Columbia
- Interactive map of Nechako Canyon Protected Area
- Location: Bulkley-Nechako RD, British Columbia
- Coordinates: 53°37′59″N 124°55′34″W
- Area: 1,246 ha (4.81 sq mi)
- Designation: Protected Area
- Established: 6 July 2000
- Governing body: BC Parks
- Website: Nechako Canyon Protected Area

Nechako Canyon Protected Area is a protected area of the BC Parks system, located on the Nechako River between Knewstubb Lake (formed by the Kenny Dam of the Nechako Diversion) and Cheslatta Falls at the mouth of the Cheslatta River. The Nechako Canyon, also known as the Grand Canyon of the Nechako, is carved into a lava plateau and features erosive formations such as rock walls, overhanging cliffs, pinnacles and other formations, and the protected area includes Cheslatta Falls.
