= Nechako =

Nechako may refer to:

- Nechako River in British Columbia
- Nechako Plateau
- Nechako Country
- Regional District of Bulkley-Nechako, British Columbia
- Nechako Reservoir
- Nechako Diversion
- Nechako, British Columbia, a neighbourhood in Kitimat, British Columbia

== See also ==
- Nechacco, a paddle steamer
