= Nechako Canyon =

Steep-sided canyon carved by the Nechako River in British Columbia, Canada

Nechako Canyon Grand Canyon of the Nechako
- Canyon
- Location within British Columbia
- Coordinates: 53°36′N 124°56′W
- Location: British Columbia
- Part of: Chilcotin Plateau
- Formed by: Nechako River

The Nechako Canyon, also known as the Grand Canyon of the Nechako, is a canyon on the Nechako River in the Central Interior of British Columbia, Canada, located between Cheslatta Falls and Knewstubb Lake, which lies immediately above the Kenny Dam, which forms the Nechako Reservoir. Cheslatta Falls, 18 m in height, is the final leg of the Cheslatta River and cascades into the Nechako at its confluence. The river-bed in the canyon is mostly dry due to the Nechako's diversion. The canyon is carved into a lava plateau and features erosive formations such as rock walls, overhanging cliffs, pinnacles and other formations, and is protected by the Nechako Canyon Protected Area, which includes Cheslatta Falls.

== See also ==
- Grand Canyon of the Stikine
