= Cheslatta Carrier Nation =

First Nation in British Columbia, Canada

- Band No. 620
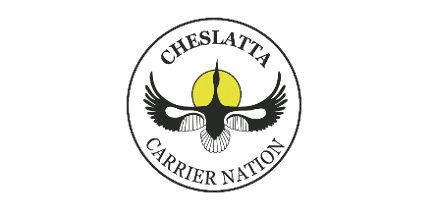
- Flag
- Headquarters: Burns Lake
- Province: British Columbia

Land
- Main reserve: Cheslatta 1
- Reserves: Alexis Thomas 1A; Holy Cross Lake 3; Murray Lake 4; Knapp Lake 6; Baptiste Louis 8; Leon 14; Targe Creek 15
- Land area: 14.03 km^{2} (5.42 sq mi)

Population (2025)
- On reserve: 149
- On other land: 24
- Off reserve: 217
- Total population: 390

Government
- Chief: Janet Whitfod
- Council: Hazel Burt; Teddy Jack

Website
- www.cheslatta.com

Cheslatta Carrier Nation or Cheslatta T'En (pronounced chez-la-ta), of the Dakelh (pronounced [tákʰɛɬ]) or Carrier people (Ta-cullies, meaning "people who go upon water" is a First Nation of the Nechako River at the headwaters of the Fraser River.

The Nechako (/nəˈtʃækoʊ/) River was once the greatest tributary of the Fraser River, and the watershed was used by the Carrier people. For centuries the Cheslatta T'en hunted, fished and trapped there and were part of an ancient trade network called the Grease Trail. The grease was actually eulachon oil. (Note: In the opening session of the Goldthorpe Inquiry into abuses in the Indian health system, in March 1980 in Alert Bay, seven elders ranging in age from 69 to 91 spoke at length of the healing qualities of traditional foods and herbs. In particular they "owed their survival to drinking oolachan oil") from the oolichan, or candlefish, a fatty Pacific coast smelt. The oil was a highly prized commodity grease trail and was carried in bentwood boxes that would often leak. It was named the Alexander Mackenzie Voyageur Route, then renamed the Nuxalk-Carrier Grease Trail to honour the guides. with the Nuxalk and Chilcotin.

The Cheslatta village and Cheslatta Lake (Tsetl'adak Bunk'ut – ″Peak Rock Lake″) flooded due to the construction of the Kenney Dam. (Note: In their exhibition Living Landscapes, under "Dams and Reservoirs", the Royal British Columbia Museum included details about the construction of Kenney Dam. In selecting the site for the dam, Alcan project engineer Charles Dunn asked John Kendrick, "What is downstream there?' And I said, 'Well, I haven't seen the reach downstream from the lake here – where we were going to build the dam – to the canyon, but I have been to the canyon.' We went in from downstream looking at it for the idea of just a small power plant developing on the Nechako River. 'So what's the country like there?' and I said, 'Well, it's pretty wide'. And so we went downstream...(Royal British Columbia Museum nd ") which created Nechako Reservoir, in 1952.

Most members now live on a dozen small scattered reserves just south of Francois Lake. In 2013 the Cheslatta Carrier Nation (CCN) "are based at Southbank, on the south shore of Francois Lake, 23 kilometres (14 mi) south of Burns Lake (Tselhk'azbunk'ut – ″hone lake″). They have eight reserves on 1,400 hectares (3,500 acres), with all reserves located at least 5 kilometres (3 mi) apart. They have 340 members, with 125 members living on reserve, although there is no central community. The band office and other community buildings are located on a reserve about two km south of the Southbank ferry dock." The population on reserve is 167 and the population off reserve is 163, with a total of 330 according to the CNN INAC Active Band list reported in the 2011–2012 Language Needs Assessment report.

== Language ==
Cheslatta, locally called Dakelh, is a dialect of the Carrier language of the Dene (Athabaskan) family of languages. "Carrier is the general term for a complex of Athabaskan dialects in central British Columbia, adjoining (but clearly distinct from) Babine on the northwest and Chilcotin on the south." Of the 330 members of the CCN, 8 are fluent Cheslatta speakers, 18 understand or speak it somewhat and 100 are learning speakers.

Dakelh/Carrier is traditionally divided into Upper and Lower Carrier. Upper Carrier includes communities to the north of Fort St. James, around Stuart and Trembleur Lakes. Lower Carrier is spoken in communities in the south. Linguists argue that Lower Carrier should be split into two dialect groups, the Fraser/Nechako and the Blackwater. The Fraser/Nechako would include Prince George, Cheslatta, Stoney Creek, Nautley, and Stellakoh. The Blackwater group would include the Ulkatcho, Kluskus, Nazko, Red Bluff, and Anahim Lake.

== Chief and councillors ==
2025 Update Janet Whitford is the current Cheslatta Carrier Nation Chief, serving alongside Hazel Burt & Ted Jack.

The office has also moved to 26999 Keefe's Landing Rd., Southbank BC.

Corrina Leween was Chief, and Hazel Burt and Ted Jack are Councillors (2015–2018). The Cheslatta Carrier Nation is represented by the British Columbia Assembly of First Nations (BCAFN), a Political Territorial Organization (PTO), a branch of the Assembly of First Nations. The BCAFN represents the 203 First Nations in British Columbia.

== Treaty process ==
The community, which is negotiating independently, has reached Stage 3 in the BC Treaty Process.

== History ==
"For centuries the Cheslatta T'en hunted, fished and trapped in the Nechako River (Nechakoh – ″Blackwater People's River″) area at the headwaters of the Fraser River (Lhtakoh – ″rivers within one another″), West Road River (Blackwater River) (Tanilhtl'uz – ″muddy water″), and Bulkley Rivers (Wet'sinkwha – "blue and green river", name of the Wetʼsuwetʼen, another branch of the Carrier people) as well as areas around Stuart (Nak'albun – ″Mount Pope Lake″) Babine lakes (Na-taw-bun-kut – "Long Lake") up to the borders of Bear Lake (Sustoobunk'ut, ᙐᔆᗜᗪᐣᗽᐪ – "black bear water lake", or Sustootibunk'ut, ᙐᔆᗜᗠᗪᐣᗽᐪ – "black bear water trail lake"). To the east, Carrier traditional territory extended as far as the Rocky Mountains.″ Long before contact with Europeans, they fished for trout, char, kokanee and whitefish in the freshwater lakes and traded with neighbouring villages for sockeye and chinook salmon. In later years many Cheslatta people had large vegetable gardens and herds of cattle and horses for which they grew fields of timothy and clover. Some worked for local sawmills or ranchers and ran traplines to earn cash to buy supplies they could not produce themselves."

In 1792–93 Nuxalk-Carrier guides led Alexander Mackenzie along the grease trail, a network of trails that were thousands of years old from the Fraser River to Bella Coola.

=== Flooding of traditional lands ===
In a major multi-authored interdisciplinary and multi-institution report entitled "Threats to Water Availability in Canada" published by Environment Canada and researched by National Water Research Institute, an entire section focused on the Nechako – Kemano Diversion as case study.

In 1950 the B.C. government and the Aluminum Company of Canada (Alcan; Rio Tinto Alcan since 2008) through then-director Ray Edwin Powell entered into an agreement to facilitate the develop of a hydroelectric project that would support Alcan's new aluminum smelting industry at Kitimat, British Columbia. The $500-million project at Kitimat was the largest public-private partnership ever introduced in Canada in 1951. British Columbia "signed over in perpetuity and at a nominal charge a huge area and much of its resource wealth-agricultural and park lands, water, forests and fish. All waters covered by the licence were to be diverted before the year 2000." Phase I "redirected flows of 115 cubic metres per second on average from the Nechako River (Fraser basin) to spill westward by tunnel through the Coast Mountains, a vertical drop 16 times higher than Niagara Falls, into the Kemano River basin."

While the Kenney Dam was under construction and the Nechako Reservoir was filled, there was a 100% loss of flow in the upper Nechako River.

In October 1952 the Nechako Reservoir started to fill. In 1954 the Kenney Dam was completed, creating a body 233 kilometres (145 mi) long that covered 880 square kilometres (339 mi^{2}).

Alcan sent in a crew to build a stone cairn on the highest ground at the site of the village on Ootsa Lake just before it was flooded, and eventually a plaque was attached.

Then Alcan restored 60% to 70% of the flow of the Nechako River "via a spillway that discharged, not from Kenney Dam but down the Cheslatta, a tributary of the Nechako. The comparatively large discharge down this small tributary scoured a deep channel in the unconsolidated sediments and deposited huge volumes of sediment in the upper Nechako. Due to a smaller dam constructed near the mouth of the Cheslatta, homes and a graveyard of the local Indian community were flooded. The community was forced to relocate on short notice to a new area and unfamiliar way of life, which led eventually to demands for redress of their losses." In 1993, the Government of Canada paid the CCN $7.4 million in a settlement for inadequate compensation in 1952.

== Demographics ==
The Cheslatta Carrier Nation (CCN) now "have eight reserves on 1,400 hectares (3,500 acres), with all reserves located at least 5 kilometres (3 mi) apart. They have 340 members, with 125 members living on reserve."

== Economic development ==
=== Cheslatta Forest Products 2001– ===
In 1996 the CCN were awarded salvage rights to trees submerged by the Kemano power project. In 2001, the CCN, Prince George-based Carrier Forest Products Ltd. and Oosta Resources Ltd. formed Cheslatta Forest Products. This three-way joint venture partnership was owned by a group of Aboriginal and non-Aboriginal residents from the Lakes Forest District, including six First Nations. Their $7.5 million sawmill at Ootsa Lake processed underwater salvage timber and timber killed by the mountain pine beetle.

== Social, educational and cultural programs and facilities ==
The CCN completed a multimillion-dollar innovative water filtration system in 2004. The Cheslatta "worked with engineers on a proposal to pump water out of Francois Lake, run it through a water filtration system up to a water tower, and then gravity feed it to a 44-kilometre (27 mi) mainline that would serve not only their community, but also the neighbouring Skin Tyee Band and Nee Tahi Buhn Band, as well as the non-native community."

The Cheslatta Carrier Nation is constructing an online archive (pre- and post- flood).

== See also ==
- Nechako Reservoir
- Kenney Dam
