= Kemano Generating Station =

- Location within British Columbia
- Location: Kemano, British Columbia, Canada
- Coordinates: 53°33′47.8″N 127°56′31.8″W
- Opening date: 1954

Reservoir
- Creates: Nechako Reservoir
- Total capacity: 32.7 km^{3} (26,500,000 acre⋅ft)

Power Station
- Operator: Rio Tinto Alcan
- Hydraulic head: 790 M
- Turbines: 8
- Installed capacity: 890 MW (max.)

The Kemano Generating Station is situated 75 km (47 mi) southeast of Kitimat in the province of British Columbia, Canada. It was completed in 1954, providing hydroelectricity for Alcan's Kitimat Aluminum smelter. The powerhouse is built in a cavern created 427 m (1,400 ft) inside the base of Mt Dubose. It produces 896 MW of power from its eight generator units, each of which has a capacity of 112 MW. It was the largest producer in the province when it was built, and is now the fifth largest electrical plant in British Columbia.

The Kemano I project was made possible by constructing the largest rockfill dam in the world at the time, the Kenney Dam on the east side of the Nechako reservoir, some 193 km (120 mi) to the east. On the west side of the Nechako reservoir, a 16-kilometre (9.9 mi) long water intake tunnel running through the Coast Mountain range diverts river water to penstocks for a huge 790-metre (2,590 ft) vertical drop to the power station at the former company town of Kemano, BC. In 1995, the provincial government cancelled the Kemano Completion Project (Kemano II) that Alcan had been planning since 1987.

The additional tunnel dubbed "Kemano T2" was completed in December 2022. No additional power generation was added.

The smelter at Kitimat consumes about 80-85% of the plant's electricity, and the remainder is sold to BC Hydro's Powerex.

== Other names ==
- Kemano I
- Kemano project
- Nechako-Kemano project
- Kemano Hydro Project
- Kemano Powerhouse
- Kemano power station
- Kemano Diversion
- Kemano-Kitimat hydro
- Kemano System
- Kemano hydroelectric plant
- Kemano generating facility
- Kemano generating plant
- Kemano Generating Station - is used by BC Hydro and the province of British Columbia in legal documents.
- Because the Kenney Dam and the Kemano powerhouse are miles apart and not connected, they don't share any name.

== See also ==
- List of generating stations in British Columbia
