= Ray Edwin Powell =

American businessman (1887–1973)

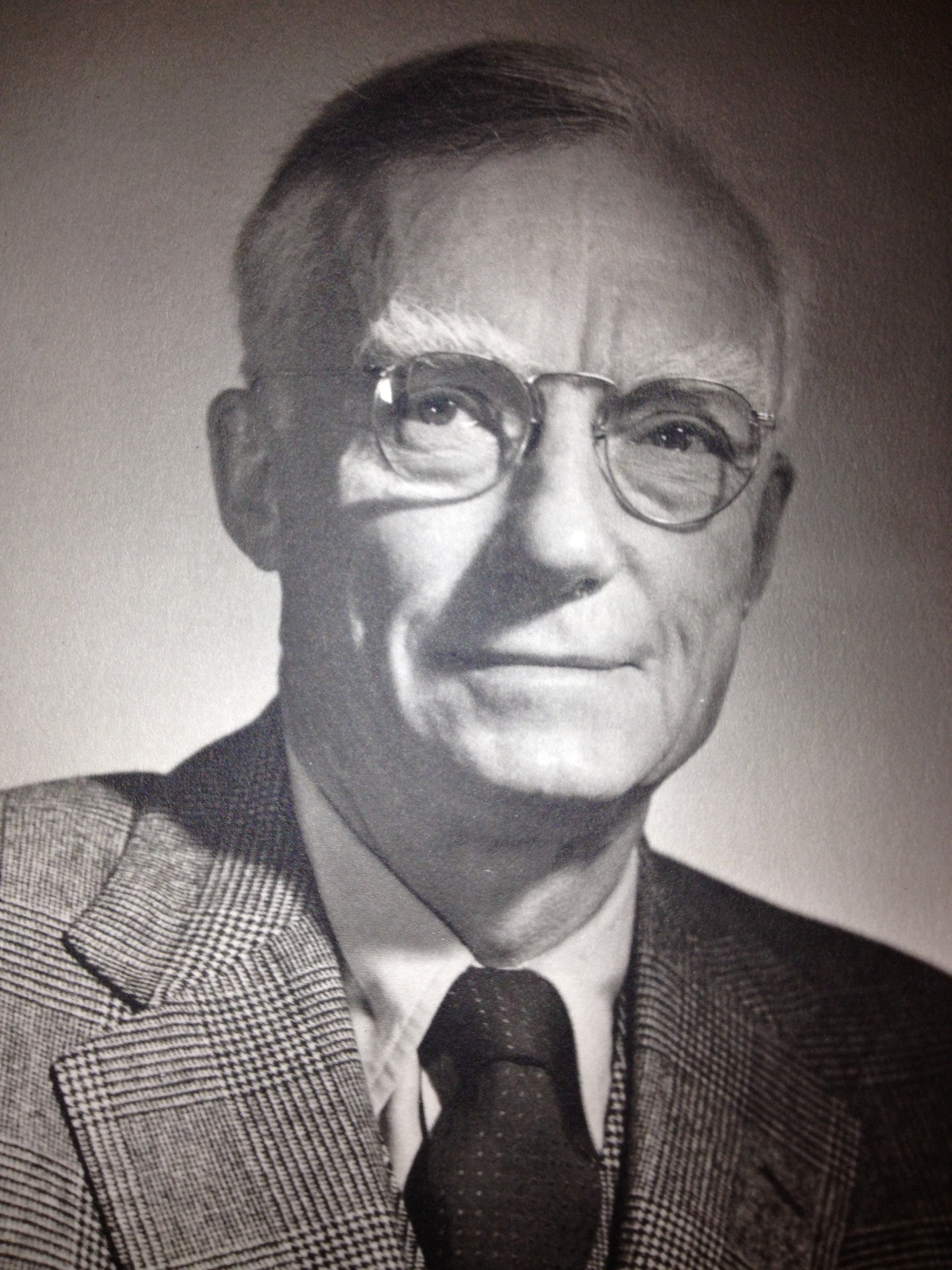
- Born: December 7, 1887; Table Grove, Illinois
- Died: November 9, 1973 (aged 85); Montreal, Quebec
- Spouse: Cecile Smith (m. 1921)

Ray Edwin Powell (December 7, 1887 – November 9, 1973) was the president of what became known as Alcan (the Aluminum Company of Canada), one of the largest aluminum companies in the world, overseeing an extraordinary expansion in the company's business. After his retirement from Alcan, he was named the 10th Chancellor of McGill University in Montreal, Quebec, Canada. He served in the position from 1957 to 1964.

== Life and career ==
Ray Edwin Powell was born in Table Grove, Illinois on December 7, 1887. He attended the University of Illinois for his post-secondary education, but dropped out before receiving his degree because of lack of financing. Powell was later awarded an Honorary Degree from this institution and several other universities. During World War I, Powell served in the United States Army. After the war, he worked at Alcoa, also known as the Aluminum Company of America. In 1928, Powell moved to Canada, becoming the vice president of what was later known as Alcan, the Aluminum Company of Canada, a subsidiary of Alcoa. The non-US operations of Alcoa were spun off from their parent company due to anti-trust regulations and were collectively united under the new Canadian company headed by Powell. Alcan eventually became larger than Alcoa and was one of the largest companies in Canada.

He later rose to become Alcan's president from 1937 to 1957. In the first seven years of his tenure, Alcan's assets increased 500%. While Powell was president, he oversaw the company's expansion from its business related to World War II. During the war, Powell used loans from the British, American, and Australian governments and tax arrangements with the government of Canada to expand Alcan's facilities along the Saguenay River. In the early 1950s, Alcan expanded once again by establishing a power development and smelter in Kitimat, British Columbia. Powell helped make Alcan into an independent Canadian company, separating it from Alcoa.

Rio Tinto, one of the largest mineral companies in the world, purchased Alcan for US$38 Billion in 2007 and merged it with their own aluminum operations to form Rio Tinto Alcan. The company is based in Montreal and is the largest aluminum company in the world.

Queen Elizabeth was rumored to have considered Powell for knighthood until it was discovered that he had retained his US citizenship and not become a Canadian, despite living in Canada for the last 45 years of his life. This honor was to commemorate Powell for his efforts in supplying aluminum to the Allied effort during World War II and for being one of the greatest industrialists in Canadian history.

After retiring from Alcan in 1957 at age 70, Powell became the 10th chancellor of McGill University in Montreal, Quebec, Canada, and held this top position until 1964. He also served as the university's governor from 1950 to 1966, when he became emeritus governor. He died in Montreal on November 9, 1973. He was survived by his wife, Cecile Smith Powell (1899–2000), four children (Robert, Mary, Cynthia and Andrew) and 16 grandchildren. He was predeceased by his brother, Ervin Powell. His daughter Mary is the wife of David M. Culver, who spent his career at Alcan, retiring as chairman and CEO in 1989. Ray Powell's son Robert (born 1923) and daughter Cynthia (born in 1927) both died in 2006, while his other children Mary (born 1925) and Andrew (born 1930) both died in 2014. Powell's four children each had four children of their own, and the extended family is now spread throughout Canada, the US and Europe.

Powell was often referred to as "Rip," which was a close acronym for his initials "REP." He served as a director of several companies such as the Bank of Montreal. McGill created the Powell Student Services Building on the university campus in his honor. Alcan named one of its large vessels that transported bauxite, the raw material used to make aluminum, the "SunRip" as a tribute to Powell. Mount Powell, a peak in British Columbia, was named in his honor after he developed the Kitimat smelter facility for Alcan in that province.
