= Cheslatta Lake =

Lake in British Columbia, Canada

- Location within British Columbia
- Location: British Columbia
- Coordinates: 53°44′N 125°21′W
- Primary inflows: Cheslatta River
- Basin countries: Canada
- Surface area: 35.0 km^{2} (13.5 sq mi)

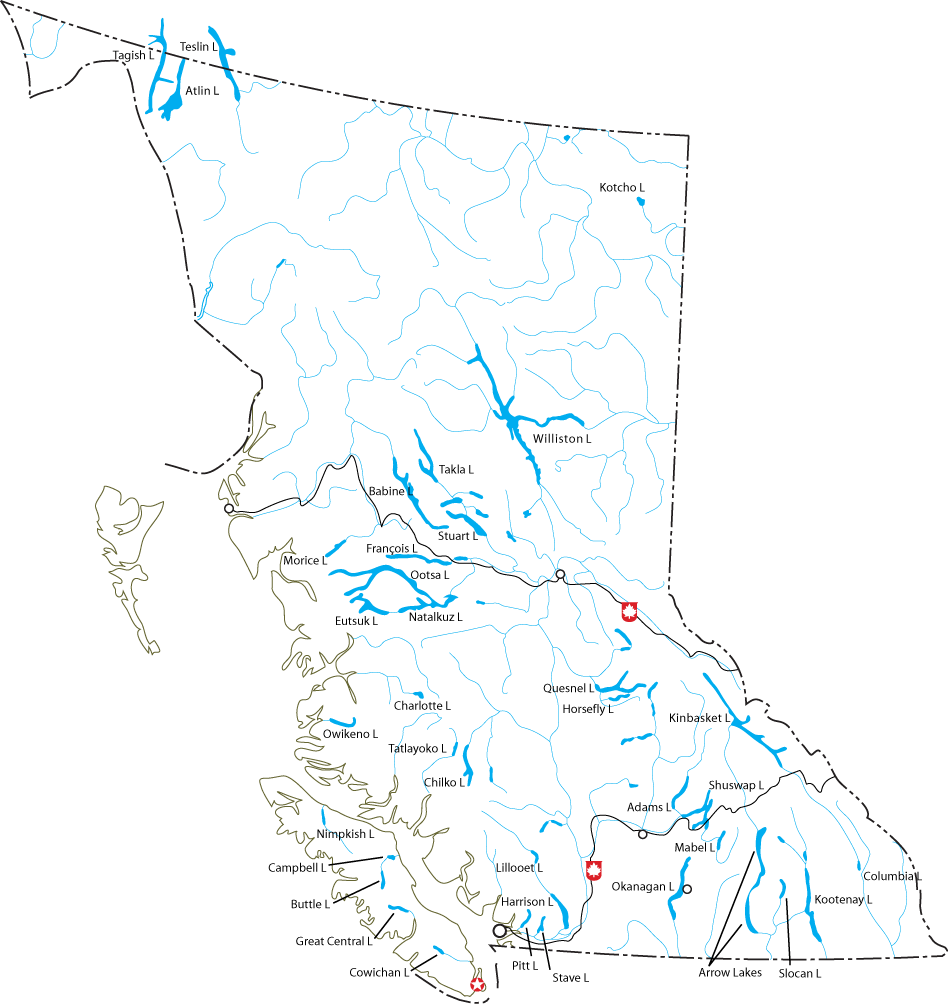
Cheslatta Lake is between François Lake and Natalkuz Lake (Nechako Reservoir) on this map.

Cheslatta Lake is a large freshwater lake located between François Lake and the western end of the Nechako Reservoir, Range 4 Coast Land District. It is in the Regional District of Bulkley-Nechako, (Note: The boundaries of the Regional District of Bulkley-Nechako near-entirely coincide with the territory of the Dakelh or Carrier peoples. Roughly identical in area to the old New Caledonia fur district in the days of the North West Company.) British Columbia.

== Etymology ==
The name derives from the Dakelh (pronounced [tákʰɛɬ])/Carrier people word meaning either 'top of small mountain' or 'small rock mountain on east side'. Cheslatta Lake appeared on Trutch's 1871 map of British Columbia as "Chestatta" Lake. In 1884, the spelling was changed to Cheslahta on Mohun's map of British Columbia. In 1891 the name was spelled as "Cheslata" Lake on Poudrier's map of Northern British Columbia. On 30 March 1917 the name "Cheslatta Lake" was adopted in the 15th Report of the Geographic Board of Canada based on the label on Jorgensen's 1895 map of BC, and as labelled on pre-emptor map 1G, 1916.

== Trophic levels ==
The ecosystems of both Cheslatta Lake and the smaller Murray Lake it joins, prior to the flooding by Kenney Dam construction, "were quite productive at all trophic levels including fish, as it is reported the fisheries of these lakes were utilized for centuries by first nation's people as traditional fishing grounds."

== Impact of Kenney Dam ==
The Construction of the Kenny Dam in the 1950s on the Nechako River, reversed water flow and sent water westward to generate electricity for use and sale by the Alcan corporation, devastated the area around Cheslatta Lake, flooding the Cheslatta Carrier Nation village and cemetery and forcing the First Nations to be relocated with little time for preparation and no consultation. Prior to the flooding, Cheslatta Lake was at the centre of the CCN traditional hunting and trapping territory. Before 1957 the Cheslatta River was a small stream with an average annual flow of about 5 cubic metres per second (180 cu ft/s). Alcan began releasing water flows far above the Cheslatta's natural capacity, resulting in a deep channel being carved out and large-scale erosion filling the Cheslatta and upper Nechako Rivers with sediment. In addition, the area between the Skins Lake spillway and the headwaters of the Cheslatta River was not a river but rather a series of meadows, pastures, and small lakes. Water released from the reservoir scoured the area between Skins Lake and Cheslatta Lake. Soil, gravel, grass, moss, shrubs, and trees were washed away, down into the Cheslatta River and into the Nechako River.

There has been a 7-fold decline in the productive capacity of Cheslatta Lake to support pelagic fishes, namely kokanee salmon.

== See also ==
- List of lakes of British Columbia
- Cheslatta River
- Kenney Dam
- Nechako Reservoir
