= Chilako River =

Location
- Country: Canada
- Province: British Columbia
- District: Cariboo Land District

Physical characteristics
- Source: Tatuk Lake
  - location: Nechako Plateau
- Mouth: Nechako River
  - location: Near Prince George
  - coordinates: 53°53′11″N 122°58′41″W
  - elevation: 581 m (1,906 ft)

The Chilako River is a tributary of the Nechako River, one of the main tributaries of the Fraser River, in the Canadian province of British Columbia. It flows through the Nechako Plateau.

The name "Chilako" comes from the Dakelh name Tsalakhoh, meaning "the river in the hands of the beaver" or "beaver hand river".

== Course ==
The Chilako River flows from Tatuk Lake, which is fed by numerous streams and other lakes. It flows generally east for about 65 kilometres (40 mi), then north for about 50 kilometres (31 mi). It empties into the Nechako River just west of Prince George.

== See also ==
- List of rivers of British Columbia
