= Knewstubb Lake =

Lake in British Columbia, Canada

- Location within British Columbia Location within Canada
- Location: Nechako Country, British Columbia Interior, Canada
- Coordinates: 53°31′00″N 124°49′00″W
- Type: lake
- Basin countries: Canada

Knewstubb Lake is an arm or stretch of the Ootsa Lake Reservoir in the Nechako Country of the western Central Interior of British Columbia, Canada. It forms part of the south arm of the reservoir, which includes adjoining stretches such as Eutsuk Lake and Natalkuz Lake, which are "upstream" to the southwest. Ootsa Lake was formed by the damming and diversion of the flow of the Nechako River, the bulk of which is now drained beneath the spine of the Coast Mountains to the west to the Kemano Powerhouse, which is the power supply for the aluminum smelter at Kitimat, to the southeast of Terrace.

Knewstubb Lake is named for F.W. Knewstubb of the British Columbia government's Water Rights Branch, who led exploration parties for power development in various regions of the Coast Mountains in the 1920s. Mount Knewstubb to the south of Franklyn Arm of Chilko Lake is also named for F.W. Knewstubb.

== See also ==
- List of lakes of British Columbia
