= Vimy Foundation =

The Vimy Foundation is a charity focused on raising awareness of the role Canada played in World War I and the implications of Canada's success in the Battle of Vimy Ridge on April 9, 1917. The Vimy Foundation was founded in 1996 by John Andrew Powell (son of Ray Edwin Powell), with support from Sir Nicholas Bonsor. Its office is located in Montreal, Canada.

== Mission ==
The mission of The Vimy Foundation is to preserve and promote Canada's First World War legacy as symbolized by the victory at Vimy Ridge in April 1917. All activities originated by the Foundation have this aspect in mind and aim to help educate and raise awareness.

The Foundation's initial step worked to establish a student scholarship program, known as the Beaverbrook Vimy Prize. It is funded by the Beaverbrook Canadian Foundation, whereby 15-20 students ranging from 15 to 17 years of age compete to win a scholarship to Europe. This summer program allows a student group to travel overseas for a week through London and Oxford in the U.K, and a week through northern France, including towns surrounding Vimy, Dieppe, and Normandy. This is an educational trip staffed by historians and secondary school teachers. Students are mostly Canadian but include one or two from France and England. The purpose of this inter-cultural grouping lies in creating a dynamically well-rounded experience for the students, as all countries were involved in the Battle of Vimy Ridge as part of the allied forces and as well have historic ties to Canada. The Canadian scholarship recipients, in the year following their trip, address their student bodies as well as provide interviews with various Canadian press outlets and attend related functions. These activities allow the recipients to share their knowledge and experiences with a number of Canadians, and play a role in spreading awareness.

This initiative was broadened through an alliance with Encounters with Canada (Encounters). Encounters is the country's largest youth forum and is based in Ottawa. Each week a group of approximately 150 Canadian high school students, from all parts of the country, gather in Ottawa in a classroom setting to focus on a particular theme regarding Canada. There are twelve areas of focus ranging from history, arts, politics, and medicine. Encounters was inspired by what The Vimy Foundation was aiming to accomplish and proposed to create a new theme, which is labeled Vimy: Canada’s Coming of Age. This program proved a success and Encounters now runs it on the basis of two consecutive weeks surrounding the date of Vimy Ridge Day, which is April 9 of each year. Approximately 300 students from all parts of Canada participate in this program annually.

=== Vimy Pin ===
The Foundation views this program as having the largest potential in terms of raising awareness. A national survey suggested that over 2/3rds of Canadians would be prepared to wear a pin recognizing Vimy Ridge Day. The same survey underlined that less than 1/3rd of Canadians recognized what Vimy Ridge was or that it was significant, and of these a potentially large portion were not aware of the circumstances or why it was significant. The Foundation aims to have the pin recognized and worn by the majority of Canadians. The National Post newspaper dubbed the pin as "April's Poppy".

Among others, hockey commentator Don Cherry endorsed the Vimy Pin. On CBC's Hockey Night in Canada he declared “I strongly support the Vimy Pin campaign, and I believe all Canadians should proudly wear the pin every April 9th.”

In 2012, the Cadets of Ontario received permission to include the Vimy Pin as part of their uniform, and approximately 20,000 of these cadets now wear this pin as part of their attire. Efforts are being made to expand this permission nationally, where approximately 150,000 cadets could be expected to include the pin as part of their uniform. For the past four years all Canadian Members of Parliament have worn a Vimy Pin on April 9, Vimy Ridge Day, in the House of Commons. Last year, several alumni of the Beaverbrook Vimy Prize were invited to the Prime Minister's Office to present Prime Minister Stephen Harper with a pin.

=== Chairman ===
General Rick Hillier, former head of The Canadian Military and Canada's Chief of Defense Staff, became Honorary Chairman of The Vimy Foundation in 2008.

=== Vimy Ridge Public School ===
In 2009, The Vimy Ridge Public School opened in Ajax, Ontario. The Durham District School Board decided to name one of its newest public schools in honour of Canada's victory at the Battle of Vimy Ridge. This initiative was supported in part by The Vimy Foundation. The school, 45 km northeast of Toronto, opened its doors September 2009. The naming committee voted unanimously for Vimy Ridge. The final selection took only one round of voting.

=== Activities ===
At the 90th Anniversary in 2007 35,000 Canadians made the trip to Vimy to celebrate this moment. Of these, 5,000 were Canadian students, all of whom received a Vimy Pin. Also in attendance were Elizabeth II, Queen of Canada, The Prime Minister of Canada, The Prime Minister of France, and many number of dignitaries. Several representatives of The Vimy Foundation attended.

In 2009 the Royal Canadian Legion endorsed The Vimy Foundation and the Vimy Pin.

In 2009 representatives from The Vimy Foundation began to take part in the annual Vimy Ridge Day commemorative ceremonies at the National War Memorial in Ottawa. Four Vimy Prize winners were invited by Veterans Affairs Canada to lay a wreath during the ceremony, representing the youth of Canada. A strong connection exists between the Foundation and Veterans Affairs Canada.

In 2010, French Ambassador to Canada François Delattre was so impressed with what the Foundation was trying to accomplish, he offered the French Embassy to The Vimy Foundation for a fund raising event in 2011 - to coincide with April 9, Vimy Ridge Day. The French Embassy funded the entire occasion allowing for all contributions made to be dedicated to The Vimy Foundation programs. This event has become an annual affair. François Delattre became Ambassador to the United States based in Washington DC in 2011. In 2014 he became the Permanent Representative of France to the United Nations in New York and head of France's UN mission.

In 2010, the Ontario Legislature proclaimed Vimy Ridge Day. The Ontario Provincial Legislature passed a new Bill proclaiming April 9 Vimy Ridge Day throughout the province. The Bill requires all Canadian flags on provincial buildings and grounds to be flown at half-mast.

In 2011, the Royal Canadian Legion Pilgrimage Medal was donated to the Canadian War Museum. This medal was worn by King Edward VIII in the unveiling of the Vimy Memorial on July 26, 1936. It had stayed in various private collections since that time but was put up for auction at Sotheby's, along with 20 other items given by the former King to Wallis Simpson, the woman for whom he abdicated the throne only a few months after the Vimy unveiling, which he personally attended and ordained. Andrew Powell, Founder and President Emeritus of The Vimy Foundation, partnered with fellow Canadian John McCall MacBain in co-purchasing this medal. Working closely with the Canadian War Museum, Mr. Powell and Mr. MacBain arranged to have the newly purchased medal sent to Canada where it will remain in the Museum's permanent collection.

In the summer of 2011, two Vimy Prize Alumni met with Prince William, Duke of Cambridge and his wife Catherine, Duchess of Cambridge. The Foundation was contacted by the Governor General's office to have two Beaverbrook Vimy Prize winners participate in a small reception in honour of the Duke and Duchess of Cambridge while they toured Canada that summer. The event was to celebrate the exceptional service of Canadian youth towards a smart and caring nation and created an intimate setting for The Prince and his wife with the selected young Canadians. The reception was hosted by David Johnston, Governor General of Canada, his wife Sharon Johnston, Canadian Prime Minister Stephen Harper, and his wife Laureen Harper. Each group represented, including The Vimy Foundation, had an allocated time period to meet directly with Prince William and Kate and their hosts.

In October 2011 two Vimy Foundation Board members were awarded the Minister of Veterans Affairs Commendation by the Canadian federal government. The awards were granted by the Steven Blaney, Minister of Veterans Affairs.

In November 2012 the Bank of Canada began to circulate a new $20 Canadian Bill. The back side of the bill is dedicated to Vimy and pictures the Memorial. This is in part the result of the efforts of The Vimy Foundation. The Vimy Foundation believes this underlines the importance of what it is aiming to accomplish in raising awareness. Such major developments underline that the most credible groups are recognizing the importance of Vimy. Mark Carney, Governor of The Bank of Canada, as well as Jim Flaherty, Canada's Finance Minister, unveiled the new $20 note to a group of students affiliated with The Vimy Foundation. Minister Flaherty at the time reiterated that Vimy was Canada's ‘coming of age’. The Vimy Foundation was represented by former Beaverbrook Vimy Prize Winners, from 2012, 2010 and 2009.

Approximately 50,000 Canadians have become aware of The Vimy Foundation, and its purpose, due to direct efforts of the Foundation. Approximately 250,000 Canadians have become aware indirectly (newspaper ads, articles, etc.). The foundation aims to have these numbers grow exponentially to the lead up of the 100th anniversary of Vimy Ridge in 2017.

For Remembrance Day 2017, the foundation partnered with the National Film Board of Canada on the nine-minute short documentary film Return to Vimy Ridge, which combines colourized archival footage with animated sequences.

== Funding ==
The Vimy Foundation has achieved its milestones with primarily one off donations, no endowment fund, and a permanent staff of only two persons. Most involved donate their time. Resources have been donated as well.

Each project has thus far been independently funded. Donors include: The Beaverbrook Canadian Foundation, Toronto Dominion Securities, Shaw Communications, Royal Bank of Canada, the Southam Foundation, the Weston Foundation, the Hudson's Bay Company, True Patriot Love Foundation, and the MacDonald Stewart Foundation. Those which have donated resources include: the National Post and National Public Relations.

More recently some donations have become program specific and span periods of several years (i.e. The Beaverbrook Canadian Foundation is uniquely funding the Beaverbrook Vimy Prize and TD Securities is funding the Encounters With Canada program).

An additional source of funding is derived from sales of The Vimy Pin.
