= Michael Craven =

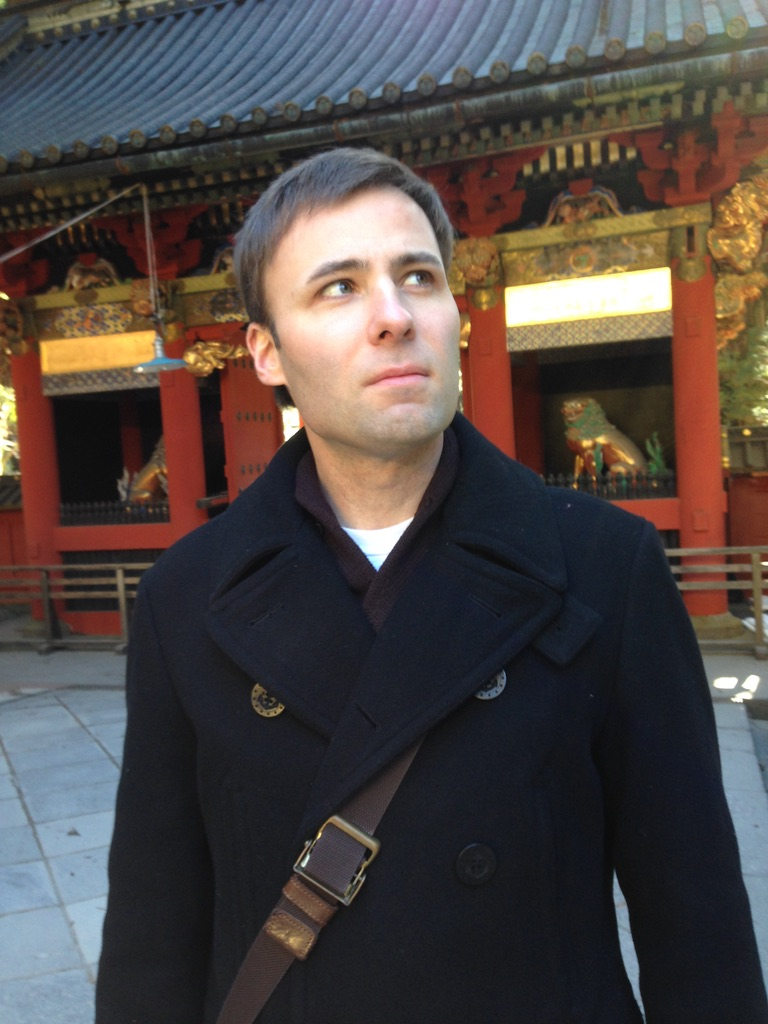
- Craven as NJPW International Department General Manager (2019)
- Born: Michael Shawn Craven; January 7, 1974 (age 52); Richmond, British Columbia, Canada
- Occupations: Sports executive, author
- Years active: 1998–present

Michael Shawn Craven (born January 7, 1974) is a Canadian sports executive and author. He has served in management roles within Japanese professional wrestling and mixed martial arts organizations.

== Career ==
Craven was born in Richmond, British Columbia, Canada, and grew up in Kitimat. He developed an interest in Japanese professional wrestling as a teenager. Prior to entering sports entertainment, he spent over 15 years in Japan working in cross-cultural business negotiations and government-related positions.

=== New Japan Pro-Wrestling (NJPW) ===
In 2018, Craven was appointed International Department General Manager for New Japan Pro-Wrestling (NJPW), the first English native speaker to hold this position.

In 2019, Craven managed NJPW's international expansion, including the creation and production of live events in the United States, United Kingdom, and Australia, including the company's first shows in three different countries within a single year, a record for a Japanese combat sports promotion.

Major events included the co-produced "G1 Supercard" at Madison Square Garden with Ring of Honor, "NJPW Royal Quest" in London, and "Southern Showdown" in Australia. In a 2019 Sports Illustrated interview, Craven stated that the MSG show was "a true 50-50 partnership" and highlighted the fair negotiation of media rights, describing it as a first for the industry. The event sold out in sixteen minutes and was the first non-WWE event at MSG in nearly sixty years.

In August 2019, NJPW's "NJPW Royal Quest" was held at Copper Box Arena in London, drawing approximately 6,119 spectators.

Craven announced the show in an interview with Mirror Sport and discussed the growth of NJPW's international fanbase. He also appeared on various podcasts, including the NJPW Official English Podcast.

In 2019, following the creation of AEW, Craven was the first NJPW executive to formally express the company's position to international media, stating: "New Japan values its long-standing partnerships, and at present, there is no working arrangement with AEW." He added, "We wish everybody at All Elite Wrestling nothing but the best."

Craven left NJPW in 2021 to care for his wife during her terminal illness.

In a 2024 interview, he reflected on that period, admitting: "We underestimated the scale of AEW," and analyzed the difficulties encountered in establishing relationships at the beginning of the company.

=== Transition to MMA ===
In early 2025, Craven became an executive at Rizin Fighting Federation, marking the first time a foreigner moved directly from a management role in a Japanese professional wrestling organization to a senior staff position in a major Japanese MMA promotion.

== Publications ==
- "AI Art Introduction: A Guide to Masterpieces from Prompts" (AI Art Introduction Series)
- 新版 AIアート入門: プロンプトから名作への道案内 [Revised edition of AI Art Introduction: A Guide to Masterpieces from Prompts] (in Japanese). ISBN 978-4-9915221-0-9.
- In Sickness and in Health: A Memoir-Guide About Love, Caregiving, and Staying Present (2026). ISBN 979-8-1910761-0-2.
