= Kemano =

Human settlement in British Columbia, Canada

Coordinates: 53°33′59″N 127°57′00″W

Location of Kemano in British Columbia

Kemano was a settlement situated 75 km (47 mi) southeast of Kitimat in the province of British Columbia in Canada. It was built to service a hydroelectric power station, built to provide energy for Alcan to smelt aluminum from its ore. The Kemano Generating Station is built 427 m (1,400 ft) inside the base of Mt Dubose in a blasted cavern. It produces 896 MW of power from its eight generators, each of which has a capacity of 112MW.

== History ==
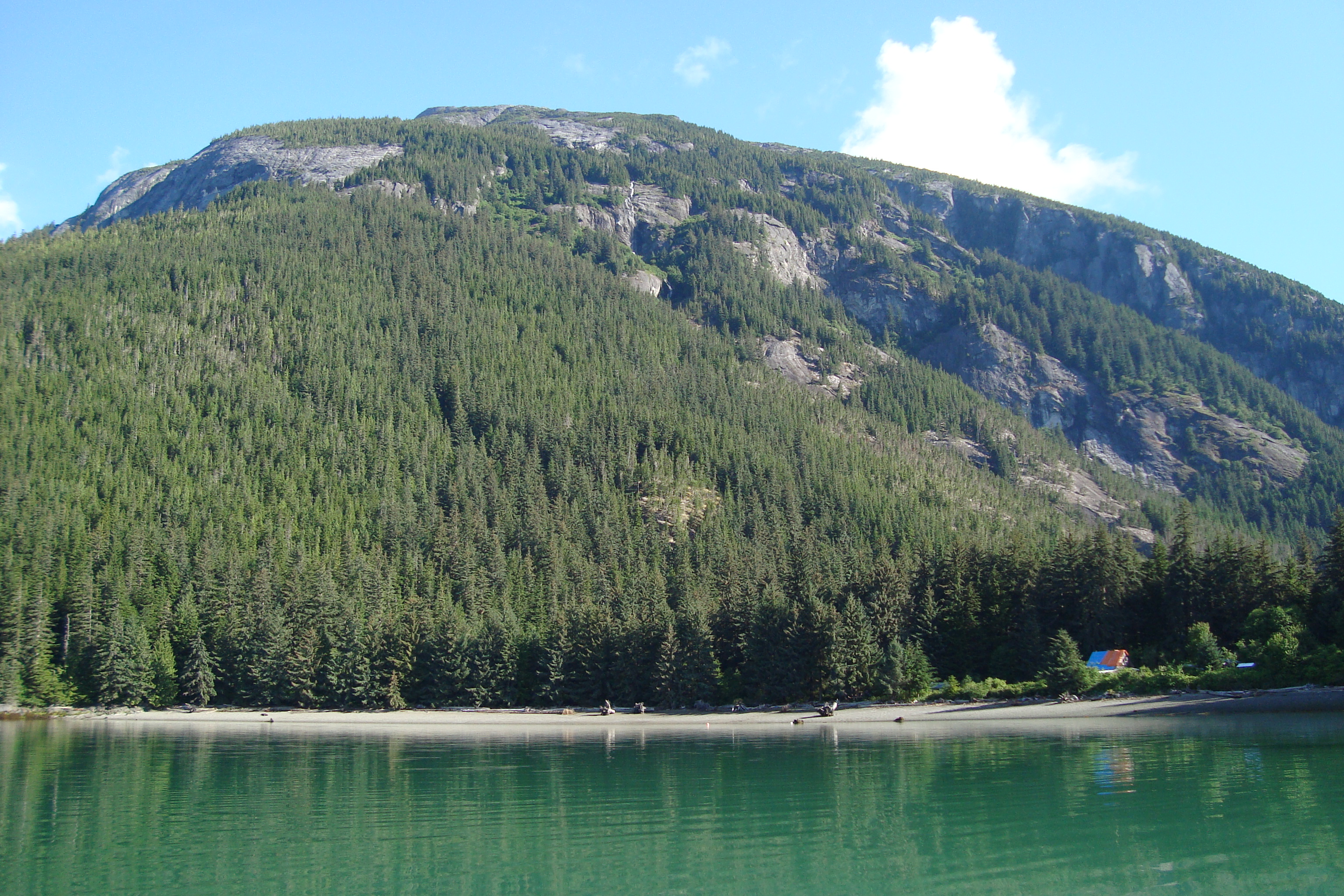
Kemano Beach, the former townsite is located further inland.

The plant comprises a 16 km (9.9 mi) long tunnel, the width of a two-lane highway, drilled and blasted through the coastal mountains to carry water to the penstocks of the Kemano powerhouse. The water plunges 800 m (2,600 ft) to drive the generators. The two 287 kV power transmission lines travel 82 km (51 mi) from Kemano to Kitimat across some of the most rugged mountain territory in British Columbia, along the Kildala Pass, about 1,500 m (5,000 ft) above sea-level. Voice communication over the power lines was the only form of fast contact between the sites. Between 1951 and 1954, 6,000 construction workers built the Kenney Dam, tunnel, powerhouse, transmission line, smelter, and townsite. There remains no road to Kemano; everything had to be brought in by air or sea. Construction equipment and supplies were barged over Tahtsa Lake to the eastern end of the tunnel. Sixteen people died making the tunnel. In 1956 the smelter complex consumed 35% of yearly electric energy in British Columbia.

The first Kemano Project, known as Kemano I, resulted in the flooding of 339 square miles (880 km^{2}) of the Nechako Reservoir, within Cheslatta territory. This reputedly removed approximately 75% of the flow of the Nechako, which is or was an important salmon river. Expansion on the project, known as Kemano II, has been contested in the Canadian courts by members of the Cheslatta Carrier Nation with a group of Elders who have filed a Statement of Claim with the Supreme Court of British Columbia.

Kemano itself is a name for a tribal subdivision of the Henaksiala, part of the Haisla group, and was a community in its own right after many of the coastal tribes withdrew during the influx of colonists post-1780, to remove themselves from the threat of diseases and the alien culture. Kemano Indian Reserve No. 17 is located at the site of the Henaksiala village, though most Haisla in the region today live at Kitamaat Village, near Kitimat.

The company town of Kemano was originally built in the 1950s and was home to a thriving small community, featuring a guesthouse, a shop which sold everything from candy to guns to socks to hats, a golf course, curling rink, bowling alley, and a church. When the power station was automated, the town eventually closed its doors as a community in 2000, the residents were moved out, and the majority of houses (including the school) were burnt down as a training exercise for selected fire departments from all of BC. The plant still exists and is operational on a shift system.

== Climate ==
Climate data for Kemano
Month	Jan	Feb	Mar	Apr	May	Jun	Jul	Aug	Sep	Oct	Nov	Dec	Year
Record high °C (°F)	12.2 (54.0)	13.5 (56.3)	18.3 (64.9)	28.0 (82.4)	33.3 (91.9)	36.0 (96.8)	37.8 (100.0)	35.0 (95.0)	33.9 (93.0)	23.0 (73.4)	15.0 (59.0)	11.5 (52.7)	37.8 (100.0)
Mean daily maximum °C (°F)	1.1 (34.0)	3.6 (38.5)	7.6 (45.7)	12.6 (54.7)	17.0 (62.6)	20.2 (68.4)	22.3 (72.1)	22.1 (71.8)	17.4 (63.3)	10.4 (50.7)	4.1 (39.4)	1.3 (34.3)	11.6 (52.9)
Daily mean °C (°F)	−1.5 (29.3)	0.4 (32.7)	3.3 (37.9)	7.2 (45.0)	11.1 (52.0)	14.4 (57.9)	16.5 (61.7)	16.4 (61.5)	12.7 (54.9)	7.2 (45.0)	1.9 (35.4)	−0.8 (30.6)	7.4 (45.3)
Mean daily minimum °C (°F)	−4.0 (24.8)	−3.0 (26.6)	−1.1 (30.0)	1.8 (35.2)	5.2 (41.4)	8.5 (47.3)	10.5 (50.9)	10.6 (51.1)	7.9 (46.2)	4.0 (39.2)	−0.4 (31.3)	−3.0 (26.6)	3.1 (37.6)
Record low °C (°F)	−24.4 (−11.9)	−24.0 (−11.2)	−18.9 (−2.0)	−7.8 (18.0)	−3.3 (26.1)	−0.6 (30.9)	2.2 (36.0)	−0.6 (30.9)	−1.1 (30.0)	−14.5 (5.9)	−25.0 (−13.0)	−21.5 (−6.7)	−25.0 (−13.0)
Average precipitation mm (inches)	249.8 (9.83)	170.6 (6.72)	137.5 (5.41)	100.3 (3.95)	68.7 (2.70)	62.5 (2.46)	61.9 (2.44)	76.9 (3.03)	162.5 (6.40)	317.7 (12.51)	293.1 (11.54)	285.4 (11.24)	1,986.9 (78.22)
Average rainfall mm (inches)	190.2 (7.49)	136.3 (5.37)	122.2 (4.81)	98.1 (3.86)	68.7 (2.70)	62.5 (2.46)	61.9 (2.44)	76.9 (3.03)	162.5 (6.40)	315.2 (12.41)	257.6 (10.14)	219.6 (8.65)	1,771.6 (69.75)
Average snowfall cm (inches)	59.7 (23.5)	34.3 (13.5)	15.3 (6.0)	2.2 (0.9)	0.0 (0.0)	0.0 (0.0)	0.0 (0.0)	0.0 (0.0)	0.0 (0.0)	2.5 (1.0)	35.5 (14.0)	65.8 (25.9)	215.3 (84.8)
Source: Environment Canada

== See also ==
- Cheslatta River
