= Kenney Dam =

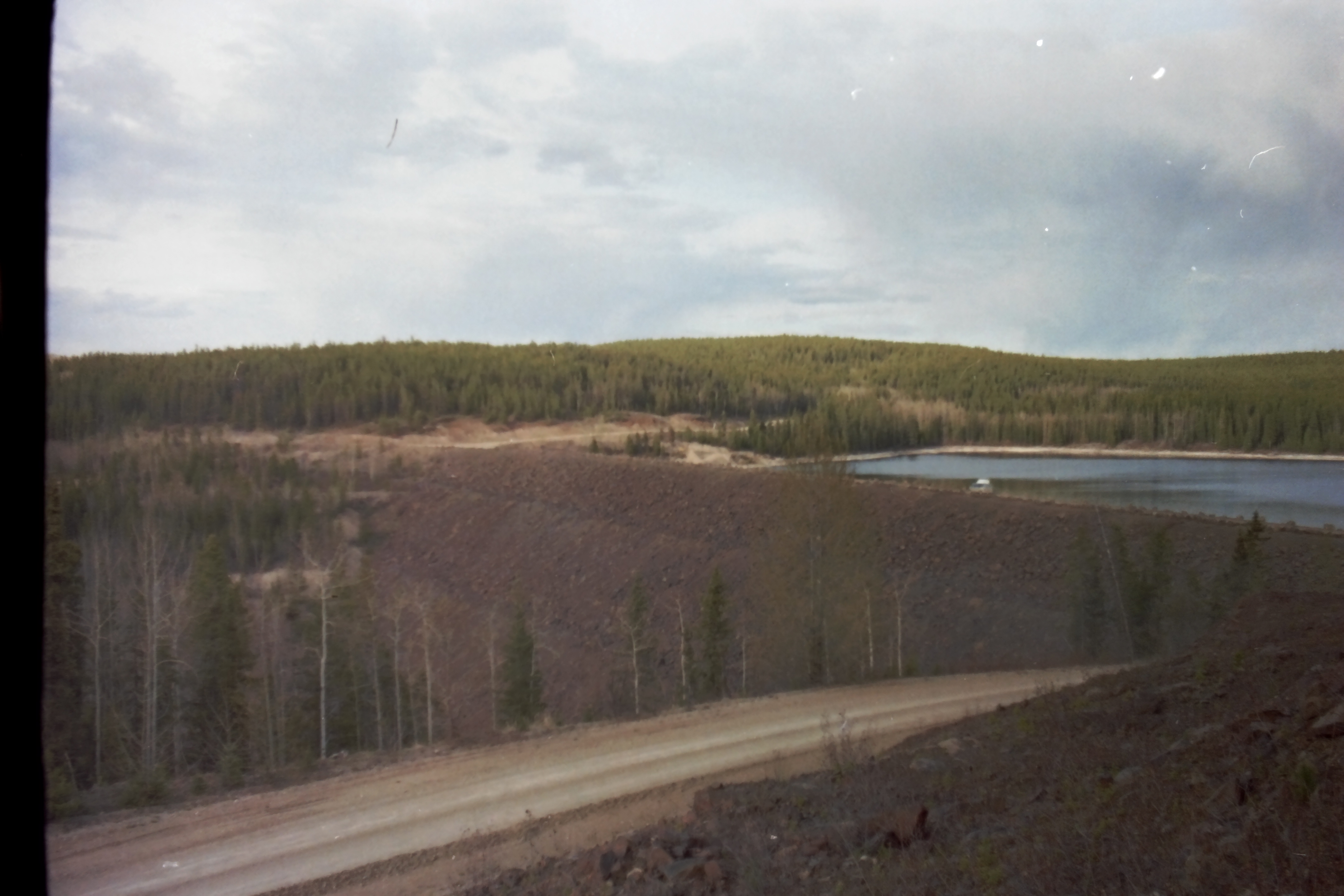

- Location within British Columbia
- Location: South of Fraser Lake, British Columbia, Canada
- Coordinates: 53°34′45″N 124°57′0″W
- Opening date: 1954
- Owner: Rio Tinto Alcan

Dam and spillways
- Type of dam: Rock-fill embankment
- Impounds: Nechako River
- Height: 97 m (318 ft)
- Length: 457 m (1,499 ft)

Reservoir
- Creates: Nechako Reservoir
- Total capacity: 32.7 km^{3} (26,500,000 acre⋅ft)

Power Station
- Turbines: 8 × 112 MW
- Installed capacity: 890 MW

The Kenney Dam is a rock-fill embankment dam on the Nechako River in northwestern British Columbia, built in the early 1950s. The impoundment of water behind the dam forms the Nechako Reservoir, which is also commonly known as the Ootsa Lake Reservoir. The dam was constructed to power an aluminum smelter in Kitimat, British Columbia by Alcan (now Rio Tinto Alcan), although in the late 1980s the company increased their economic activity by selling excess electricity across North America. The development of the dam caused various environmental problems along with the displacement of the Cheslatta T'En First Nation, whose traditional land was flooded.

== History ==
=== Selection of the dam site ===
Following the Second World War, the Canadian government invited the Aluminum Company of Canada (Alcan) to explore the potential of various sites around the country for hydroelectric power generation. British Columbia was particularly interested in attracting the aluminum industry. Premier Byron Johnson introduced special legislation authorizing the provincial cabinet to do what it thought necessary to establish a new aluminum industry in BC. For its part, Alcan was concerned with locating its energy-intensive aluminum smelters near to an inexpensive source of hydroelectric power. Chilko Lake in the Chilcotin region was the original proposed site for the Kenney Dam, but due to preliminary calculations by Fisheries and Oceans Canada showing that the Chilko Lake held up to three-quarters of the Fraser River's total sockeye salmon spawned in the region, the provincial government eliminated the site from the proposal. In 1948, following feasibility studies, Alcan decided to pursue a project on the Nechako River to power a large aluminum smelter to be located at the new townsite of Kitimat. A public opinion poll taken in 1949 indicated that an overwhelming majority of British Columbians supported the Alcan's plans for hydroelectric development on the Nechako. Support was not universal, however: for example, the International Pacific Salmon Fisheries Commission objected to the use of a salmon river for power.

Alcan had originally proposed that the BC government build the dam and the company buy the electricity from the province, but the government declined. Instead, Alcan signed the Kemano I agreement with the province on December 29, 1950 which granted the company rights to divert water from the Nechako above the dam and Nanika River downstream of Nanika Falls, permission to dam the Nechako and divert a portion of the original flow through a tunnel to a hydroelectric facility at Kemano, tax exemptions, and favourable water rental rates. Alcan also received timber rights and mineral rights on the Crown land that was flooded, and was given the opportunity to purchase land for the townsite of Kitimat at a rate of $1.60 per acre.

=== Construction and technical specifications ===
Construction of the dam and its associated facilities began in 1951 and continued until 1967, although the dam became operational in 1954. The dam, located in the Canyon of the Nechako River, is a rock-filled, clay-core dam measuring 97 metres high and 457 metres wide (at the top). Construction involved over 3 million cubic metres of material. Concrete was injected in bedrock fissures below the dam to stabilize the foundation. Until the W. A. C. Bennett Dam was built on the Peace River in the 1960s, the Kenney Dam was the largest rockfill dam in the world. The dam was named for the Hon. Edward Tourtellotte Kenney, then-Minister of Lands and Forests in the government of Premier Byron Johnson.

Behind the dam, the Nechako Reservoir filled from 1952 to 1957, flooding a series of lakes in the drainage basin of the upper Nechako River. The water of the reservoir filled an area of 92,000 hectares. However, the level of the reservoir can vary by more than 3 metres depending on rainfall and power generation needs.

The dam, which sits at the east end of the reservoir, forms part of a hydroelectric complex which also includes the Skins Lake spillway, which regulates water levels both in the reservoir and downstream. On the west side of the reservoir, a 16-kilometre (9.9 mi) long intake tunnel running through the Coast Mountain range brings water to penstocks for a 2,600-foot (790 m) vertical drop to the 8 units of the 890-MW Kemano Generating Station. The basic design of the Kenney Dam-Kemano power station inspired a similar development in Quebec. The Bersimis-1 generating station, built between 1953 and 1956 by Hydro-Québec, shares many features with Alcan's project.

Concurrent with the hydroelectric development of the Nechako, the Alcan smelter, and townsite of Kitimat were created.

== Relocation of the Cheslatta T'En ==
=== Flooding of First Nations land ===
At the request of Fisheries and Oceans Canada (DFO) and Department of Indian Affairs (DIA), the Murray Dam and the Skins spillway were constructed across the Cheslatta River to help cool water temperatures in the upper Nechako River in order to minimize the impact on salmon spawning from the development of the Kenney Dam. As a result of the discharged water from the Murray Dam and the spillway, the traditional lands which had been home to the Cheslatta T'En people for at least 10,000 years, were flooded and caused the relocation of approximately 200 Cheslatta people. Villages were demolished and burned prior to the flooding with most families unable to return to collect their belongings and as water levels rose, it has been noted that coffins and skeletons from their traditional grave sites were washed away with skeletal remains being allegedly found in and around Cheslatta Lake.

=== Relocation and compensation ===
The Cheslatta T'En people were given approximately 10 days notice before they were relocated to live in overcrowded tents at a temporary location 30 miles north of their reserves in Grassy Plains. They were responsible for transporting their own belongings by means of wagons and consequently were forced to leave most of their traditional possessions behind. After months of living in poor conditions at the temporary location sites, the Cheslatta people were eventually resettled on marginal farms scattered over large areas, which proved disconcerting for this once close-knit community. According to DIA documents, the Cheslatta people asked for $108,000 in compensation along with payments for their new land, traplines and monthly pensions, however requests were denied and claims were dismissed. Payments in the form of money were demanded for their new land and any constructional improvements within their community. The Cheslatta people were compensated an average of $77/hectare with no payment covering moving expenses, compared to non-native individuals who received relocation compensation of $1,544/hectare along with covered moving expenses. It was only a year after the Murray Dam was constructed that the band members received their compensation payments.

The Cheslatta people were also regulated on where to hunt and when to fish which combined with the land payments forced many people to seek welfare benefits. Their traditional practices became increasingly difficult as they were forced to conform to a new way of living and consequently death tolls rose from tuberculosis, suicide and alcoholism as a result of their poor living conditions. Requests for assistance in health care, education and housing were denied until 1964 when the relocation sites were officially turned into federal reserves.

DIA records show unanimous support by the Cheslatta people for the surrender of their territory, however many band members state that no formal assent was conducted and the signatures on documents are forged by Indian affairs officials. It is also widely debated whether or not the legal rights of the Cheslatta people were presented as many claim that they were unaware of their power to refuse the requests of the Government of British Columbia, along with their ability to have a third-party advisor. The Cheslatta people also claimed that Alcan had assured them most grave sites would be unaffected by rising water levels, however any grave sites running the risk of inundation would be transferred to higher grounds and the Cheslatta would be informed. Alcan, however, claimed that the Cheslatta had agreed to flooding the grave sites, so long as two recent graves were moved and commemorative markers were placed above the flood waters. In accordance with this understanding, Alcan moved two graves while the rest of the grave markers were burned.

=== Subsequent settlements ===
In 1990, the Cheslatta filed a $122 million court case against the Canadian government over DIA fraud, duress and breach of trust, however the case was settled out of court for slightly less than $7 million. In 1998, Members of the Cheslatta Carrier Nation filed a Statement of Claim with the Supreme Court of British Columbia disputing all agreements and licenses issued to Alcan by the Federal and Provincial governments. The appeal was dismissed in Alcan's favour with no further legal actions in effect.

On January 30, 2012, Rio Tinto Alcan finalized the transfer of approximately 11,000 acres of land to the Cheslatta Carrier Nation. The Cheslatta received the land as a form of freehold ownership with an estimated value of $1.2 million

== Environmental impacts ==
Construction of the dam involved flooding 32,000 acres of land in order to create the Nechako Reservoir. This flooding impacted surrounding agricultural land and caused the loss of 8.7 million cubic meters of timber. The reservoir also disrupted existing ecosystems, and impacted animals such as beavers, Canada geese, ducks, moose, and about 100 trumpeter swans, equivalent to one eighth of Canada's swan population. The Nechako Reservoir took four years to fill, during these four year there was no flow running from the Nechako Reservoir for 50 miles between the dam and the Nautley River. The fish left in this section of the river remained trapped and died. Local animals that relied on that section of the river were also forced to migrate. In the first two years of operation, smelter emissions from the new Aluminum plant in Kitimat were believed to have caused further forest depletion, health problems for local workers, and harm on aquatic ecosystems.

=== Impacts on fisheries ===
Although there was a general public acceptance of the proposed hydroelectric dam and smelter plant in the Fraser River region, the fisheries sector was outspoken about the dam's potential effects on salmon reproductive patterns. Hydroelectric development in the region was seen in the media as being disruptive to important Fraser salmon spawning areas. There were limitations to long-term streamflow and ecosystems data in the Fraser River and its tributaries, which has made specific impacts of river diversion hard to evaluate.

The staff at the IPSFC and the DFO surveyed the Nechako River and discovered that the loss of salmon spawning grounds would not be the main threat to sockeye populations in dam construction. Rather, it was the diversion of the river's natural flow that would cause the most impact to the sockeye population. Research showed that because of the massive amount of water to be transmitted to the coast, there would be a loss of water during the spring and summer months, causing reduced flow. Close to 100 percent of the river's estimated mean annual flow was diverted into the reservoir during the four-year period. 627 million cubic feet of water were withdrawn from the river daily. Therefore, the Nechako riverbed would be affected, as well as causing a rise in water temperatures, which would make summer migration for salmon more difficult. In the process of dam development, water temperatures exceeded 20 degrees Celsius, and the safest levels for sockeye salmon is 14 degrees Celsius. Although the Nechako River temperatures became too high, the dam reservoir water temperatures were too low, and contained too high of levels of nitrogen and not enough oxygen for salmon.

Due to these concerns, the DFO asked Alcan to assist the river's flow during the summer months. Eventually both parties agreed to an extra spillway on Cheslatta Lake that would promote the natural flow of the river during these dry periods. The Cheslatta, a tributary of the Nechako, would hold a spillway and reservoir to supply the water needed in sockeye migration during the summer months. The river regained between 60 and 70 percent of flow, three years after the spillway was implemented.

== Economic impact ==
=== Energy export ===
Starting in the 1960s, Alcan was no longer producing energy solely for Kitimat's aluminum smelter. The company had begun selling the extra energy produced by the Kenney Dam to BC Hydro, a publicly owned company. By 1968, Alcan was producing enough energy to allow BC Hydro to delay their proposed $100 million project by 10 years. BC Hydro's proposed project would improve the power transmission system from Prince George and Smithers and it would extend the transmission system further to Terrace. In 1978, when the project went forward, Alcan was able to run energy directly into the province's power grid. Because the BC Hydro grid is linked to the North American grid, Alcan began selling energy to Alberta and the United States. In order to meet the energy demands in its new market, Alcan began diverting more water into its reservoir, resulting in lower water levels in the Nechako River. The decrease in water levels provided an increase the water temperatures. By 1980 water temperatures in the Nechako River had risen above what Fisheries and Oceans Canada (DFO) consider to be safe for migrating and spawning salmon. In response to the DFO studies, the federal government asked Alcan to increase water flow from the Nechako Reservoir into the river, but Alcan declined. This led to the "constitutional battle" over who controls the flow of water in the Nechako River.

== Kemano Completion Project ==
In the late 1970s Alcan announced the Kemano Completion Project. The project would construct a second tunnel from the Nechako Reservoir to Kemano, where four more power generators would be built.

Controversies began in 1980, starting with the DFO and the federal government when they realized Alcan was going to go ahead with the Kemano Completion project without addressing the existing water level and temperature concerns. The proposed Kemano Completion Project would result in an additional 12% reduction in the Nechako River water levels. To avoid increased tensions Alcan accepted annual renewals of a court injunction setting water flows from 1980 until 1985, while the DFO performed studies on the potential effects on the Nechako's salmon population. In 1985, Alcan refused to consent to the renewal of the injunction, and DFO brought a claim against Alcan in the Supreme Court of British Columbia. Both parties armed with their own scientists. While the trial was briefly commenced in 1987, it was ultimately settled out of court through negotiations involving Alcan, the provincial government and the federal government, resulting in the 1987 settlement agreement. Aspects of the agreement include: Alcan could build a cold water release valve in the Nechako Reservoir to cool the water temperature for migrating salmon and, in turn, release a smaller volume of water, and the company gave up its water rights to the Nanika River. In addition, the federal and provincial governments agreed to allow Alcan to proceed with a modified version of its completion project. Critics and opposition governments accused all three parties of not doing a proper environmental assessment.

Alcan has not built the cold water release facility outlined in the 1987 settlement agreement, and as such has not reduced the amount of water released in to the Nechako water system. Studies showed that the water in the reservoir was too cold and contained too much nitrogen, while not enough oxygen. In order to create the correct balance, it was suggested that Alcan needed to draw water from both the centre and the surface of the reservoir, then run the water through "a hallow cone valve and over a baffle-clock spillway to reduce the amount of nitrogen". Second delays in the construction were due to a decrease in the demand of aluminum and a decrease in the economy.

In the early 1990s there were increased objections to the completion project, both from the public and the newly elected NDP provincial government, and in 1993 the BC Utilities Commission was directed to conduct public hearings. The hearings began January 17, 1994. They looked at the design and construction of the plans for the facilities required for the completion project, hydrology impacts, fishery impacts, and the economic impacts for the people in the surrounding areas. In 1995, due to the potential and unresolved impacts on the salmon fishery, BC Premier Mike Harcourt announced the cancellation of the Kemano Completion Project. However, Alcan had already invested $1.3 billion in the Kemano Completion Project and in 1987 had been given permission to continue with the project.

After two years of negotiations between Alcan and the BC government, the two parties signed the 1997 settlement agreement. Alcan committed to spending $50 million on a cold water release facility at Kenney Dam. In addition, the government paid Alcan $500 million for what the company had previously invested in the project.

== See also ==
- Nechako River
- Nechako Reservoir
- Nechako Canyon Protected Area
- Kemano, British Columbia
- Kitimat, British Columbia
