= Nechako River =

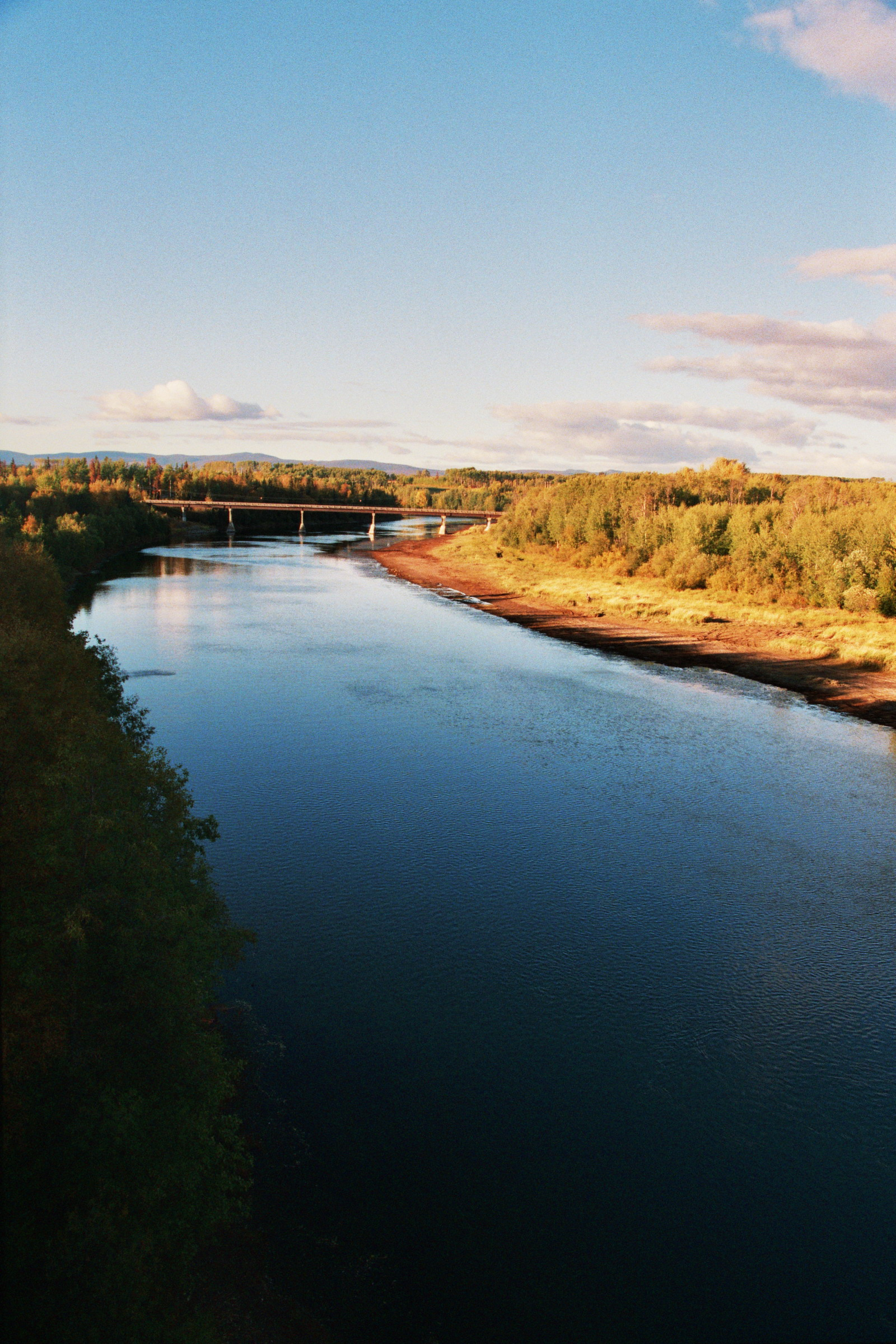
- The Nechako River and Highway 16 bridge, near Fort Fraser
- Etymology: Dakelh term meaning "big river"

Location
- Country: Canada
- Province: British Columbia
- District: Cariboo Land District
- City: Prince George

Physical characteristics
- Source: Nechako Plateau
- Mouth: Fraser River
  - location: Prince George
  - coordinates: 53°55′2″N 122°42′53″W
  - elevation: 559 m (1,834 ft)
- Length: 516 km (321 mi)
- Basin size: 42,700 km^{2} (16,500 sq mi)
- Discharge
  - location: gauge at Isle Pierre
  - average: 277 m^{3}/s (9,800 cu ft/s)
  - minimum: 40.8 m^{3}/s (1,440 cu ft/s)
  - maximum: 1,180 m^{3}/s (42,000 cu ft/s)

The Nechako River (Dakelh: ᘅᐪᙠᗶᑋ) /nəˈtʃækoʊ/ arises on the Nechako Plateau east of the Kitimat Ranges of the Coast Mountains of British Columbia, Canada, and flows north toward Fort Fraser, then east to Prince George where it enters the Fraser River. "Nechako" is an anglicization of netʃa koh, its name in the indigenous Carrier language which means "big river".

The Nechako River's main tributaries are the Stuart River, which enters about 45 kilometres (28 mi) east of Vanderhoof, the Endako River, the Chilako River, which enters about 15 kilometres (9 mi) west of Prince George, and the Nautley River, a short stream from Fraser Lake. Other tributaries include the Cheslatta River, which drains Cheslatta Lake and enters the Nechako at the foot of the Nechako Canyon via Cheslatta Falls, near Kenney Dam and the Nechako Reservoir.

== History ==
The expedition of Alexander MacKenzie went past the mouth of the Nechako in 1793 without observing it. The first European to ascend the Nechako was James McDougall, a member of Simon Fraser's expedition, in 1806.

== Nechako Reservoir ==
The Nechako is one of the main tributaries of the Fraser River, although half of its flow was diverted through the Coast Mountains to the Kemano generating station at sea level on the Gardner Canal, 858 metres (2,815 ft) below the reservoir's intakes, which supplies power to the aluminum smelter at nearby Kitimat. The main reservoir of the Nechako power diversion is called the Nechako Reservoir or Ootsa Lake Reservoir, but there are many subnames for different parts of the lake because its conversion into a reservoir involved the amalgamation of chains of lakes, the largest of which were Eutsuk Lake and Natalkuz Lake, which form the south arm of the reservoir. The reservoir's alternate name comes from Ootsa Lake, now merged into the north arm of the reservoir but originally flowing into the Ootsa River, a tributary of the Nechako. Other lakes also merged into the north arm are Whitesail Lake and Tahtsa Lake, with the correspondingly-named rivers connecting them now flooded and renamed Whitesail Reach and Tahtsa Reach. The Quanchus Range is located between the two arms of the reservoir.

The damming of the Nechako in 1952 and the consequent massive reduction in flow has been the source of considerable political controversy. The Cheslatta Carrier Nation, a subgroup of the Dakelh or Carrier people, were flooded out by the creation of the reservoir and forced to abandon their homes with only two weeks' warning. The increase in water temperature caused by the reduction in flow has been an ongoing problem for the salmon run on the Fraser and Stuart Rivers as well as the Nechako. Populations of White Sturgeon may have also been affected as studies show an unnatural decline in late-juvenile/early adult populations of the species.

== See also ==
- List of tributaries of the Fraser River
- List of rivers of British Columbia
