= Nechako Reservoir =

- Location within British Columbia
- Location: British Columbia
- Coordinates: 53°45′N 126°0′W
- Type: hydroelectric reservoir
- Primary inflows: Nechako River
- Primary outflows: penstock
- Basin countries: Canada
- Max. length: 140 mi (230 km)
- Surface area: 890 km^{2} (340 sq mi)
- Max. depth: 305 m (1,001 ft)
- Surface elevation: 2,790 ft (850 m)
- Sections/sub-basins: Northern arm (Ootsa Lake, Whitesail Lake, Whitesail Reach) and south arm (Eutsuk Lake, Natalkuz Lake, Chedakuz Arm, Knewstubb Lake, Tetachuck Lake)

The Nechako Reservoir, sometimes called the Ootsa Lake Reservoir, is a hydroelectric reservoir in British Columbia, Canada that was formed by the Kenney Dam making a diversion of the Nechako River through a 16-km intake tunnel in the Kitimat Ranges of the Coast Mountains to the 890 MW Kemano Generating Station at sea level at Kemano to service the then-new Alcan aluminum smelter at Kitimat. When it was constructed on the Nechako River in 1952, it resulted in the relocation of over 75 families. It was one of the biggest reservoirs built in Canada until the completion of the Columbia Treaty Dams and the W.A.C. Bennett Dam that created Lake Williston. The water level may swing 20 feet between 2790 and 2800 feet.

The damming "linked the rivers and lakes of Ootsa, Intata, Whitesail, Chelaslie, Tetachuck, Tahtsa, Sinclair (Long Lake), Euchu Lake, and Natalkuz into the reservoir with a surface area of over 90,000 hectares." "The water of these lakes and rivers was diverted westward to the Pacific Ocean, instead of eastward to the Fraser River."

The creation of the reservoir flooded the series of lakes which typified the upper Nechako basin and in the process rendered the Quanchus Range, which lies between the north and south arms of the reservoir, a virtual island. The names of lakes amalgamated into the reservoir are perpetuated as names for the various stretches of water. The north arm includes Ootsa Lake, Whitesail Lake, and Whitesail Reach, the south arm Eutsuk Lake, Natalkuz Lake, Chedakuz Arm, Knewstubb Lake, Tetachuck Lake, and others. Because Ootsa Lake is the largest of the original lakes its name is sometimes used for the whole reservoir, though the official name remains Nechako Reservoir.

Tweedsmuir North Provincial Park and Protected Area and Entiako Provincial Park both border the reservoir.

== Impact ==
=== Cheslatta Dakelh (Carrier) ===
For many generations, the shores of Cheslatta Lake were home to the Cheslatta Carrier Nation. The flooding of Nechako Canyon destroyed their traditional hunting and fishing grounds and their homes.

=== Salvage archaeology ===
In the late 1940s, University of British Columbia professor Charles Edward Borden shifted his attention toward urgent salvage archaeology in the Nechako Canyon after learning that ALCAN planned on flooding the Nechako Canyon to supply power for their smelter in Kitimat (known as Kemano I Project). In 1951 Borden and his protégé, anthropology student, Wilson Duff located over 130 sites of importance to Cheslatta T'en history. They conducted more intensive investigations prior to the flooding of the area. The damming triggered "devastating changes for First Nations communities whose traditional territories lay in their path, including the destruction of Aboriginal gravesites, territories, livelihoods, and archaeological sites." In 1957, Alcan opened the gate of the spillway to Skin's Lake desecrating Cheslatta graves, which came to public attention during the Royal Commission on Aboriginal Peoples.

== Kemano Completion Project ==
In the 1970s, Alcan proposed expanding the generating capacity at their Kemano Powerhouse by diverting more water from the Nechako Reservoir. At that time, it was envisioned that no additional dams would be required, and there would be no additional flooding. However, the project faced challenges and was ultimately canceled by the Provincial Government in 1995 due to significant environmental concerns related to the Nechako River.

A second power tunnel between the reservoir and the powerhouse was later completed as the Kemano T2 Project. Rio Tinto's board approved the project in December 2017. The project was intended to provide redundancy for the original tunnel and improve the long-term reliability of the power supply to the Kemano Powerhouse and Rio Tinto's BC Works smelter in Kitimat. Construction of the 16-kilometre tunnel was completed in May 2022; it produced its first megawatt of electricity in July 2022 and was commissioned on 1 December 2022. The District of Kitimat lists the Rio Tinto Kemano T2 Project (2017–2022) as complete.

== Climate ==
Tahtsa Lake is at the far western end of Nechako Reservoir and has a subarctic climate (Köppen Dfc), with high levels of precipitation and snowfall.

Climate data for Tahtsa Lake West, BC (1981-2010):863m
Month	Jan	Feb	Mar	Apr	May	Jun	Jul	Aug	Sep	Oct	Nov	Dec	Year
Record high °C (°F)	10.5 (50.9)	13.9 (57.0)	14.0 (57.2)	21.1 (70.0)	30.0 (86.0)	28.3 (82.9)	31.7 (89.1)	33.0 (91.4)	27.8 (82.0)	22.0 (71.6)	12.8 (55.0)	10.6 (51.1)	33.0 (91.4)
Mean daily maximum °C (°F)	−2.3 (27.9)	−0.7 (30.7)	3.4 (38.1)	7.0 (44.6)	11.1 (52.0)	14.6 (58.3)	17.6 (63.7)	17.8 (64.0)	13.9 (57.0)	6.8 (44.2)	0.7 (33.3)	−1.9 (28.6)	7.3 (45.2)
Daily mean °C (°F)	−5.5 (22.1)	−4.7 (23.5)	−1.5 (29.3)	1.7 (35.1)	5.2 (41.4)	8.6 (47.5)	11.8 (53.2)	11.8 (53.2)	8.4 (47.1)	3.2 (37.8)	−2.2 (28.0)	−4.8 (23.4)	2.7 (36.8)
Mean daily minimum °C (°F)	−8.7 (16.3)	−8.8 (16.2)	−6.4 (20.5)	−3.5 (25.7)	−0.8 (30.6)	2.6 (36.7)	5.9 (42.6)	5.8 (42.4)	2.8 (37.0)	−0.5 (31.1)	−5.0 (23.0)	−7.7 (18.1)	−2.0 (28.4)
Record low °C (°F)	−35.6 (−32.1)	−35.0 (−31.0)	−31.7 (−25.1)	−19.4 (−2.9)	−6.7 (19.9)	−2.0 (28.4)	−6.1 (21.0)	−6.1 (21.0)	−20.0 (−4.0)	−26.0 (−14.8)	−30.0 (−22.0)	−32.2 (−26.0)	−35.6 (−32.1)
Average precipitation mm (inches)	267.3 (10.52)	202.4 (7.97)	134.6 (5.30)	94.1 (3.70)	75.1 (2.96)	64.9 (2.56)	51.4 (2.02)	74.4 (2.93)	155.2 (6.11)	281.9 (11.10)	295.1 (11.62)	288.3 (11.35)	1,984.7 (78.14)
Average snowfall cm (inches)	200.9 (79.1)	165.5 (65.2)	101.8 (40.1)	45.4 (17.9)	9.0 (3.5)	0.2 (0.1)	0.0 (0.0)	0.0 (0.0)	0.6 (0.2)	40.0 (15.7)	186.5 (73.4)	225.8 (88.9)	975.7 (384.1)
Source: Environment Canada

Wistaria is on the northern shore of Nechako Reservoir, about 85km east of Tahtsa Lake. Wistaria also has a subarctic climate (Köppen Dfc), but it receives far less precipitation and snowfall.

Climate data for Wistaria, BC (1981-2010): 863m
Month	Jan	Feb	Mar	Apr	May	Jun	Jul	Aug	Sep	Oct	Nov	Dec	Year
Record high °C (°F)	11.1 (52.0)	12.8 (55.0)	18.3 (64.9)	26.7 (80.1)	35.6 (96.1)	32.8 (91.0)	36.1 (97.0)	35.6 (96.1)	33.9 (93.0)	24.4 (75.9)	18.0 (64.4)	11.5 (52.7)	36.1 (97.0)
Mean daily maximum °C (°F)	−4.1 (24.6)	−1.4 (29.5)	3.3 (37.9)	8.5 (47.3)	13.2 (55.8)	17.2 (63.0)	19.6 (67.3)	19.8 (67.6)	15.6 (60.1)	8.3 (46.9)	1.0 (33.8)	−3.0 (26.6)	8.2 (46.7)
Daily mean °C (°F)	−7.9 (17.8)	−6.2 (20.8)	−2.1 (28.2)	2.7 (36.9)	7.2 (45.0)	11.2 (52.2)	13.5 (56.3)	13.4 (56.1)	9.5 (49.1)	4.0 (39.2)	−2.1 (28.2)	−6.3 (20.7)	3.1 (37.5)
Mean daily minimum °C (°F)	−11.6 (11.1)	−11.1 (12.0)	−7.6 (18.3)	−3.1 (26.4)	1.1 (34.0)	5.2 (41.4)	7.4 (45.3)	6.9 (44.4)	3.5 (38.3)	−0.4 (31.3)	−5.2 (22.6)	−9.5 (14.9)	−2.0 (28.3)
Record low °C (°F)	−43.9 (−47.0)	−40.6 (−41.1)	−36.1 (−33.0)	−25.6 (−14.1)	−9.4 (15.1)	−4.4 (24.1)	−2.8 (27.0)	−3.3 (26.1)	−10.0 (14.0)	−23.5 (−10.3)	−35.5 (−31.9)	−41.7 (−43.1)	−43.9 (−47.0)
Average precipitation mm (inches)	38.5 (1.52)	25.5 (1.00)	20.5 (0.81)	16.7 (0.66)	32.3 (1.27)	54.0 (2.13)	42.3 (1.67)	38.0 (1.50)	41.4 (1.63)	40.3 (1.59)	43.7 (1.72)	39.5 (1.56)	432.7 (17.06)
Average snowfall cm (inches)	32.5 (12.8)	23.0 (9.1)	18.8 (7.4)	6.1 (2.4)	2.5 (1.0)	0.0 (0.0)	0.0 (0.0)	0.0 (0.0)	0.1 (0.0)	9.4 (3.7)	30.2 (11.9)	34.8 (13.7)	157.4 (62)
Source: Environment Canada

== See also ==
- List of lakes of British Columbia
- List of tributaries of the Fraser River
- Kenney Dam
