= Alcan =

Canadian aluminum company (1902–2008)

Aluminum Company of Canada
- Traded as: TSX: AL
- Industry: Mining; aluminium manufacturing
- Founded: June 3, 1902
- Defunct: January 1, 2008
- Fate: Acquired by Rio Tinto
- Successor: Rio Tinto Alcan
- Headquarters: Maison Alcan, Montreal, Quebec
- Products: Aluminium

Alcan was a Canadian mining company and aluminum manufacturer. It was founded in 1902 as the Northern Aluminum Company, renamed Aluminum Company of Canada in 1925, and Alcan Aluminum in 1966. It was rebranded once more in 2001, to Alcan Incorporated. During that time, it grew to become one of the world's largest aluminum manufacturers.

Alcan was purchased by Australian-British multinational Rio Tinto for $38 billion in 2007, becoming Rio Tinto Alcan Inc. in 2008. It was headquartered in Montreal, in its Maison Alcan complex.

== History ==
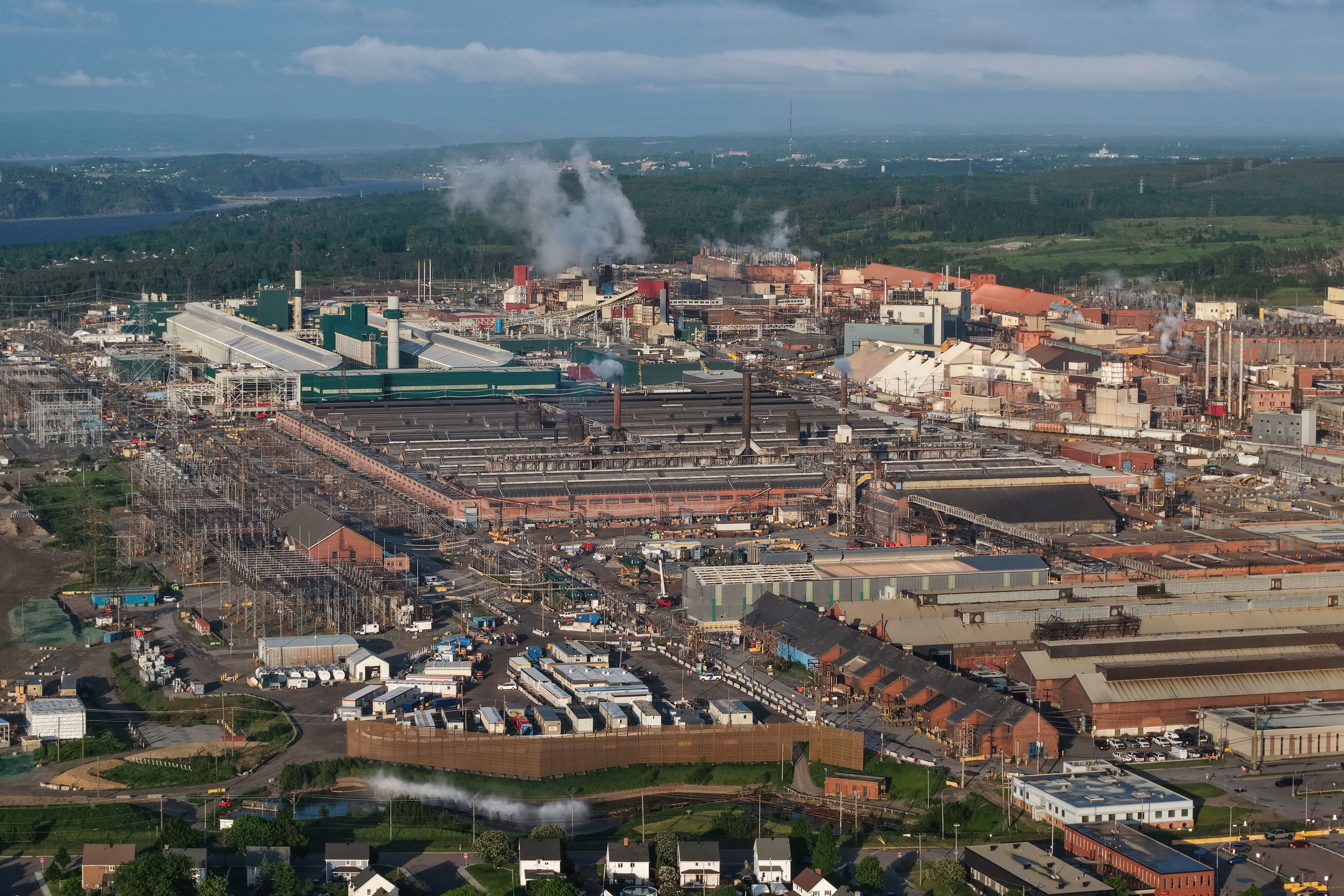
The former Alcan aluminium complex at Arvida, now operated by Rio Tinto Alcan

The Northern Aluminum Company was founded in 1902 in Shawinigan, Quebec, as part of the Pittsburgh Reduction Company. In 1913, the company opened a kitchen utensil production plant and foundry in Toronto. It added a rolling mill in the plant a few years later.

During World War I (1914–18), aluminum production increased to 131,000 tonnes from 69,000.

In 1925, the company was renamed the Aluminum Company of Canada. It was responsible for rapid development in Arvida, today a part of the city of Saguenay in Quebec, by contributing to the construction of major ports and railway facilities. It began production at its sheet rolling and extrusion facility in Ontario in 1940.

In 1931, the Northern Aluminum Co. Ltd., or Alcan Industries Ltd. pig and rolled aluminum factory was opened on land acquired in 1929 in the then-hamlet of Hardwick, Banbury, England. The factory helped build parts for Spitfire fighter aircraft during World War II. The Alcan Laboratories Club was founded in 1948 by the lab technicians to promote the well-being of the workforce in general. As a result, the village began to grow. By the early 1950s, the local economy had become dependent on the plant's prosperity, with 24% of the town's workers being employed there. At this time, 13% were employed in distribution, 7% in clothing, and 5% in agriculture.

With the onset of World War II, the Allies' demand for aluminum expanded rapidly, and with it the company. Already accounting for roughly three-quarters of the production capacity for aluminum in the British Empire, the company's "assets increased fivefold; sales increased fivefold; net income increased sixfold" between 1937 and 1944, according to a report commissioned by the Government of Canada. The governments of the UK, Canada, US, and Australia facilitated this growth with low-interest loans and tax deferrals.

In 1945, the Aluminum Company of Canada was officially registered under the trade name Alcan. Sales fell substantially in the immediate aftermath of the war but rebounded with postwar expansion, as aluminum was increasingly in use in construction, by electrical utilities, and in manufacturing. In 1951, the company initiated a $500-million project at Kitimat, British Columbia, the largest public-private partnership ever created in Canada at the time.

Despite a June 1950 antitrust ruling by a US court that forced shareholders to divest themselves of shares in either Aluminum Limited (as the company was then known) or Alcoa, and the rise of American rivals Kaiser and Reynolds, Alcan remained a dominant player in the aluminum sector for many subsequent decades.

In 1994, Alcan sold their building products unit (with a plant in Scarborough, Ontario) to Genstar Capital, and the location was later closed and demolished.

Between 1998 and 2001, Saguenay-Lac-Saint-Jean became the largest construction site in North America, as Alcan undertook a $3-billion construction project in Alma, with a yearly production capacity of 400,000 metric tonnes. In 2000, Alcan acquired Algroup (Alusuisse Group Ltd.), merging the companies to become Alcan, Inc. in 2001. Alcan became the second biggest primary aluminum production company. It then became the world's largest aluminum manufacturer in 2004 after acquiring the Pechiney Group, the fourth player in worldwide production and fabrication of aluminum and the number-three in packaging.

=== Acquisition ===
In 2007, Rio Tinto acquired Alcan in a US$38 billion deal. The offer served to undermine a hostile bid of $27.5bn from Alcoa, Alcan's US rival. Rio Tinto thus became the world's leading aluminum producer. The company quickly announced its intention to sell off the Engineered Products and Packaging business groups. Alcan Incorporated was amalgamated with Rio Tinto Canada Holding Incorporated and renamed Rio Tinto Alcan Incorporated in 2008.

The various Alcan facilities on the 53-acre site in Oxfordshire closed between 2006 and 2007, and the factory and laboratory were demolished over the course of 2008–2009.

In 2010, Alcan Packaging was sold to Amcor, Alcan Composites to Schweiter Technologies, and Alcan Food Packaging to Bemis.

In 2011, Rio Tinto sold Apollo Global Management and FSI shareholdings of 51% and 10%, respectively, of Alcan Engineered Products (excluding Cable). Rio Tinto retained 39%.

== Name history ==
Throughout its history, the original operating company and the later holding company used numerous similar names and included both the "aluminum" and "aluminium" spellings. The companies' names were as follows:

=== Alcan (Canadian operations) ===
1. Northern Aluminum Company (Limited) (June 3, 1902 – July 8, 1925)
2. Aluminum Company of Canada, Limited (July 8, 1925 – July 24, 1987)
3. Alcan Aluminium Limited (July 24, 1987 – January 1, 1995)

=== Aluminium (holding company) ===
1. Aluminium Limited (May 31, 1928 – April 28, 1966)
2. Alcan Aluminium Limited (April 28, 1966 – July 24, 1987)
3. Alcan Aluminium Holdings Limited (July 24, 1987 – January 1, 1995)

=== Single company after 1995 ===
1. Alcan Aluminium Limited (January 1, 1995 – March 1, 2001)
2. Alcan Inc. (March 1, 2001 – January 1, 2008)
3. Rio Tinto Alcan Inc. (since January 1, 2008)

== Leadership ==
The following were the presidents and chairs of Alcan, that is, the Canadian operating company founded in 1902. The holding company founded in 1928 had separate directors and officers.

=== President ===
1. Richard Beatty Mellon, 1902–1910
2. Arthur Vining Davis, 1910–1929
3. Edward Kirk Davis, 1929–1937
4. Ray Edwin Powell, 1937–1957
5. Fraser Wallace Bruce, 1957–1969
6. Paul-Henri Leman, April 3, 1969 – June 1, 1975
7. David Michael Culver, 1975–1977
8. Patrick Jean-Jacques Rich, 1978–1982
9. David Morton, 1982–1989
10. Jacques Bougie, 1989–2001
11. Donald Travis Engen, 2001–2006
12. Richard B. Evans, 2006–2008

=== Chair of the Board ===
1. Paul-Henri Leman, 1975–1977
2. David Michael Culver, 1978–1979
3. John Hampton Hale, 1979–1983
4. David Michael Culver, 1983–1989
5. David Morton, 1989–1995
6. John Robert Evans, 1995–2002
7. Louis Yves Fortier, 2002–2008
