= Kitimat =

- District municipality
- District of Kitimat
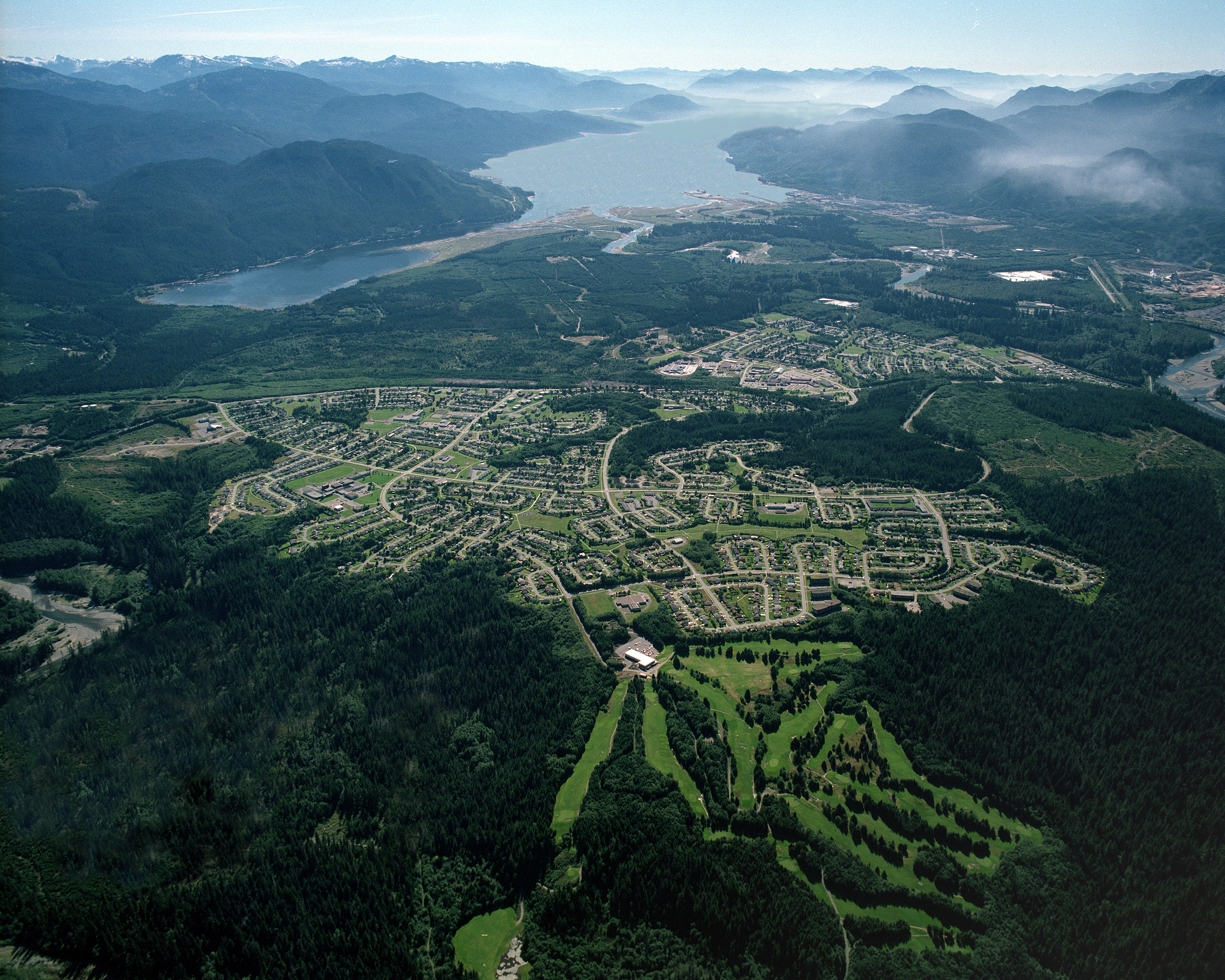
- Aerial photo of Kitimat residential area with Douglas Channel in the background.

- Flag

- Location in British Columbia Kitimat (Canada)
- Coordinates: 54°03′12″N 128°39′08″W C
- Country: Canada
- Province: British Columbia
- Regional district: Kitimat–Stikine

Government
  - Mayor: Phil Germuth

Area
  - Total: 242.63 km^{2} (93.68 sq mi)
- Elevation: 40 m (130 ft)

Population (2021)
  - Total: 8,236
  - Density: 34.7/km^{2} (90/sq mi)
- Time zone: UTC−07:00 (PT)
- Forward sortation area: V8C
- Area code: 250 / 778 / 236
- Highways: Highway 37
- Website: www.kitimat.ca

Kitimat is a district municipality in the North Coast region of British Columbia, Canada. It is a member municipality of the Regional District of Kitimat–Stikine regional government. The Kitimat Valley is part of the most populous urban district in northwest British Columbia, which includes Terrace to the north along the Skeena River Valley. The city was planned and built by the Aluminum Company of Canada (Alcan) during the 1950s. Its post office was approved on 6 June 1952.

Kitimat's municipal area is 242.63 km^{2} (93.68 sq mi). It is located on tidewater in one of the few wide, flat valleys on the coast of British Columbia. The 2021 census recorded 8,236 citizens.

The District of Kitimat Development Services situates the port of Kitimat as an integral part of the Northwest Corridor connecting North America to the Pacific Ocean and the Pacific Rim.

== History ==
"Kitimat" in the Tsimshian language refers to the Haisla First Nation as the "People of the Snow". Before 1950 the Kitimat township was a small fishing village at the head of the Kitimat Arm of the Douglas Channel, a deepwater fjord.

The municipal town of Kitimat came into existence in 1951 after the Provincial Government of British Columbia invited Alcan to develop hydroelectric facilities to support one of the most power-intensive of all industries—the aluminum smelting industry. The company built a dam, 16 km (10 mi) tunnel, powerhouse, 82 km (51 mi) transmission line, a deep-sea terminal and smelter. The company also designed, laid out and assisted with the initial construction of the city. At the time, the combined development was considered "the most expensive project ever attempted by private industry."

Alcan employed the services of city planner Clarence Stein in order to ensure the community design facilitated an environment that would attract and retain workers, although Alcan intended it to not be a company town. Today, Kitimat benefits from the quality of planning resulting from the Garden City design concept. Stein's design kept industry well separated from the community with large areas for expansion. He also created looped streets surrounding an urban city centre mall and linked by over 45 km (28 mi) of walkways connecting to all areas of the community.

The substantial greenspace areas and future expansion concepts designed by Stein have been upheld to this day by the city planners, thereby resulting in a low-density settlement pattern interspersed with forested patches. Also, the Alcan-based city origin and land provenance remain documented in the form of restrictive covenants registered on title.

== Economy ==
Aluminum producer Rio Tinto is the main employer in the municipality. Local government, schools, small manufacturing and service/retail are secondary contributors. Secondary core activities include engineering, import of petrochemical products (methanol and condensate), and metal fabrication.

Several liquefied natural gas export projects have been proposed for the Kitimat area. The proposed Kitimat LNG development at Bish Creek was intended to receive natural gas from the Western Canadian Sedimentary Basin and export it to Asian markets. In July 2014, the Financial Post reported that Apache Corporation intended to leave the Kitimat LNG project following pressure from hedge fund Jana Partners LLC. The separate LNG Canada project shipped its first export cargo in June 2025.

The proposed Northern Gateway pipeline project would have connected Alberta to an oil export terminal in Kitimat, but the federal government rejected the project on 29 November 2016.

Air services for the community are provided through Northwest Regional Airport, with connections to Prince George, Vancouver, and Calgary.

=== Kemano hydroelectric project ===
External media
- Kemano-Kitimat transmission line

Images
- Catenary

Video
- Helicopter landing on catenary

In the 1920s, the provincial government of British Columbia extensively evaluated the province's hydroelectric generating potential. In the late 1940s, the Canadian Government sought to develop the resources of northwest British Columbia. This led to the identification of the Eutsuk/Ootsa/Nechako River drainage basin as a potential site for a sizable reservoir. The potential of this system of rivers and lakes prompted British Columbia to invite Alcan to conduct a detailed investigation of the area. Alcan was searching for a site for a large aluminum smelter, an activity requiring substantial amounts of electricity. Alcan concluded that the area could generate the required electricity and decided to build a smelter there. The post-World War II boom had increased demand for aluminum.

Between 1951 and 1954, after signing an agreement with the British Columbia government for land and water rights, Alcan undertook the Kitimat–Kemano Project. The project required building the Kenney Dam to divert water from the Nechako River drainage basin and boring a 16 km (10 mi) tunnel under Mount Dubose, within the Coast Range, to the underground Kemano Generating Station. Electricity from Kemano is transported 80 km (50 mi) across mountains via a purpose-built twin-circuit transmission line. After avalanches tore away transmission towers, a catenary system was built.

In three years, 6,000 construction workers built the dam, tunnel, powerhouse, transmission line, smelter, and town.

The town of Kitimat was built on land cleared from old-growth forest. The development included the Kenney Dam, the underground hydroelectric generating station at Kemano, an aluminum smelter, a year-round deepwater port, a townsite, and a paved highway.

=== LNG Canada terminal project ===
In October 2018, Shell and its partners approved investment in LNG Canada, a liquefied natural gas export terminal in Kitimat, and the associated Coastal GasLink Pipeline, which supplies the terminal with natural gas from northeastern British Columbia.

In October 2023, installation of the Coastal GasLink pipeline was completed.

LNG Canada shipped its first export cargo on 30 June 2025, following the start of production earlier that month. The cargo was loaded aboard the tanker Gaslog Glasgow for shipment to Asia. The facility became Canada's first large-scale commercial LNG operation.

=== Pacific Future pipeline and refinery ===
The Pacific Future Energy Refinery was proposed as a facility to refine more than 30,000 cubic metres per day of Western Canadian Select bitumen over an operating life of at least 60 years. The proposal was backed by Grupo Salinas and was promoted as using European technology to reduce its environmental impact.

The refinery was subsequently described as an $11 billion project incorporating carbon capture and storage technology. Early plans called for construction in stages, with modules manufactured in Asia and transported to Prince Rupert, British Columbia, for assembly. When the project was announced in June 2014, financing had not been secured, and preliminary design work was expected to require $250 million.

In December 2024, Pacific Future chief executive Samer Salameh informed the Impact Assessment Agency of Canada that the project had been discontinued. On 11 February 2025, federal environment minister Steven Guilbeault terminated the project's environmental assessment following confirmation that the proponents were no longer proceeding.

== Geography ==
Kitimat is situated in the Kitimat Valley in northwestern British Columbia, near the mouth of the Kitimat River at the head of Douglas Channel. The surrounding terrain forms part of the Coast Mountains.

Kitimat is approximately 63 km (39 mi) south of Terrace via Highway 37, which connects with Highway 16 near Thornhill. Prince Rupert is approximately 207 km (129 mi) northwest by road, and Prince George is approximately 629 km (391 mi) to the east by road.

== Climate ==
Kitimat has a warm-summer humid continental (Köppen climate classification Dfb) with mild summers and cold, snowy winters (much warmer than inland) with significant snowfall averaging 128 inches (325 cm) each year. The rainiest season is fall, with the wettest month, October, having 320 mm of rainfall. There is also a significant drying trend (Mediterranean pattern) in summer, but it is too cold and rainy to classify as such. Cloud cover is significant, especially in winter, and less than 30% of possible sunshine occurs each year.

Climate data for Kitimat
Month	Jan	Feb	Mar	Apr	May	Jun	Jul	Aug	Sep	Oct	Nov	Dec	Year
Record high °C (°F)	12.2 (54.0)	13.0 (55.4)	18.0 (64.4)	27.5 (81.5)	32.8 (91.0)	37.0 (98.6)	41.1 (106.0)	36.0 (96.8)	33.3 (91.9)	25.0 (77.0)	13.3 (55.9)	10.0 (50.0)	41.1 (106.0)
Mean daily maximum °C (°F)	0.5 (32.9)	3.1 (37.6)	6.7 (44.1)	11.7 (53.1)	16.2 (61.2)	19.5 (67.1)	21.6 (70.9)	21.4 (70.5)	16.8 (62.2)	10.1 (50.2)	3.9 (39.0)	1.2 (34.2)	11.1 (52.0)
Daily mean °C (°F)	−1.7 (28.9)	0.3 (32.5)	3.2 (37.8)	7.1 (44.8)	11.0 (51.8)	14.5 (58.1)	16.7 (62.1)	16.5 (61.7)	12.6 (54.7)	7.2 (45.0)	1.8 (35.2)	−0.8 (30.6)	7.4 (45.3)
Mean daily minimum °C (°F)	−4.0 (24.8)	−2.5 (27.5)	−0.3 (31.5)	2.4 (36.3)	5.7 (42.3)	9.5 (49.1)	11.7 (53.1)	11.5 (52.7)	8.3 (46.9)	4.3 (39.7)	−0.3 (31.5)	−2.8 (27.0)	3.6 (38.5)
Record low °C (°F)	−25.0 (−13.0)	−23.9 (−11.0)	−19.4 (−2.9)	−10.0 (14.0)	−6.7 (19.9)	−0.6 (30.9)	3.9 (39.0)	2.0 (35.6)	−2.0 (28.4)	−13.0 (8.6)	−24.0 (−11.2)	−25.0 (−13.0)	−25.0 (−13.0)
Average precipitation mm (inches)	288.4 (11.35)	186.8 (7.35)	160.7 (6.33)	128.3 (5.05)	89.5 (3.52)	73.1 (2.88)	62.4 (2.46)	95.7 (3.77)	190.2 (7.49)	323.5 (12.74)	320.3 (12.61)	291.8 (11.49)	2,210.7 (87.04)
Average rainfall mm (inches)	195.7 (7.70)	133.6 (5.26)	134.5 (5.30)	123.0 (4.84)	88.7 (3.49)	73.1 (2.88)	62.4 (2.46)	95.7 (3.77)	190.2 (7.49)	319.9 (12.59)	266.6 (10.50)	202.7 (7.98)	1,886.1 (74.26)
Average snowfall cm (inches)	92.7 (36.5)	53.2 (20.9)	26.3 (10.4)	5.4 (2.1)	0.8 (0.3)	0.0 (0.0)	0.0 (0.0)	0.0 (0.0)	0.0 (0.0)	3.6 (1.4)	53.7 (21.1)	89.1 (35.1)	324.6 (127.8)
Average precipitation days (≥ 0.2 mm)	19.7	15.5	18.5	17.2	15.8	14.8	13.2	13.7	16.9	22.1	21.7	21.5	210.5
Average rainy days (≥ 0.2 mm)	14.5	12.0	16.7	17.0	15.8	14.8	13.2	13.7	16.9	21.9	18.8	14.8	190.1
Average snowy days (≥ 0.2 cm)	9.2	6.3	5.0	1.2	0.2	0.0	0.0	0.0	0.0	1.0	7.0	11.4	41.2
Mean monthly sunshine hours	48.5	75.9	103.8	153.9	199.6	189.5	214.3	196.5	129.7	69.2	38.1	30.9	1,449.9
Percentage possible sunshine	19.5	27.7	28.3	36.6	40.3	37.1	41.7	42.7	33.9	21.1	14.8	13.3	29.7

== Demographics ==
Historical population
Year	Pop.	±%
1986	11,196	—
1991	11,305	+1.0%
1996	11,136	−1.5%
2001	10,285	−7.6%
2006	8,987	−12.6%
2011	8,335	−7.3%
2016	8,131	−2.4%
2021	8,236	+1.3%

In the 2021 Census of Population conducted by Statistics Canada, Kitimat had a population of 8,236 living in 3,604 of its 4,381 total private dwellings, a change of 1.3% from its 2016 population of 8,131. With a land area of 239.28 km^{2} (92.39 sq mi), it had a population density of 34.4/km^{2} (89.1/sq mi) in 2021.

=== Ethnicity ===
The most common ethnicities in Kitimat as per the 2021 census are English (21.7%), Scottish (16.6%), Irish (14.6%), German (14.6%), Canadian (12.8%), Portuguese (12.6%), French (8.2%), Ukrainian (5.1%), Dutch (4%), and First Nations, n.o.s. (3.7%).

Panethnic groups in the District of Kitimat (1986−2021)
Panethnic group	2021		2016		2011		2006		2001		1996		1991		1986	
Panethnic group	Pop.	%	Pop.	%	Pop.	%	Pop.	%	Pop.	%	Pop.	%	Pop.	%	Pop.	%
European (Note: Statistic includes all persons that did not make up part of a visible minority or an indigenous identity.)	6,285	76.55%	6,555	81.38%	6,950	83.38%	7,595	84.86%	8,895	86.87%	9,780	88.03%	9,645	85.51%	9,690	87.06%
Indigenous	1,240	15.1%	940	11.67%	920	11.04%	755	8.44%	540	5.27%	545	4.91%	715	6.34%	530	4.76%
Southeast Asian (Note: Statistic includes total responses of "Filipino" and "Southeast Asian" under visible minority section on census.)	200	2.44%	105	1.3%	155	1.86%	115	1.28%	90	0.88%	65	0.59%	35	0.31%	30	0.27%
South Asian	145	1.77%	155	1.92%	135	1.62%	255	2.85%	465	4.54%	430	3.87%	660	5.85%	670	6.02%
African	130	1.58%	80	0.99%	0	0%	30	0.34%	80	0.78%	40	0.36%	25	0.22%	45	0.4%
East Asian (Note: Statistic includes total responses of "Chinese", "Korean", and "Japanese" under visible minority section on census.)	95	1.16%	95	1.18%	120	1.44%	140	1.56%	105	1.03%	180	1.62%	165	1.46%	135	1.21%
Latin American	60	0.73%	70	0.87%	10	0.12%	45	0.5%	65	0.63%	10	0.09%	10	0.09%	20	0.18%
Middle Eastern (Note: Statistic includes total responses of "West Asian" and "Arab" under visible minority section on census.)	30	0.37%	0	0%	0	0%	0	0%	0	0%	30	0.27%	25	0.22%	10	0.09%
Other/multiracial (Note: Statistic includes total responses of "Visible minority, n.i.e." and "Multiple visible minorities" under visible minority section on census.)	25	0.3%	55	0.68%	0	0%	20	0.22%	0	0%	15	0.14%	—N/a	—N/a	—N/a	—N/a
Total responses	8,210	99.68%	8,055	99.07%	8,335	100%	8,950	99.59%	10,240	99.56%	11,110	99.77%	11,280	99.78%	11,130	99.41%
Total population	8,236	100%	8,131	100%	8,335	100%	8,987	100%	10,285	100%	11,136	100%	11,305	100%	11,196	100%
Note: Totals greater than 100% due to multiple origin responses.

=== Religion ===
According to the 2021 census, religious groups in Kitimat included:

- Irreligion (4,220 persons or 51.4%)
- Christianity (3,690 persons or 44.9%)
- Islam (110 persons or 1.3%)
- Hinduism (45 persons or 0.5%)
- Buddhism (35 persons or 0.4%)
- Sikhism (20 persons or 0.2%)
- Indigenous Spirituality (10 persons or 0.1%)
- Other (75 persons or 0.9%)

Religious groups in the District of Kitimat (1991−2021)
Religious group	2021		2011		2001		1991	
Religious group	Pop.	%	Pop.	%	Pop.	%	Pop.	%
Irreligious	4,220	51.4%	3,250	38.97%	2,320	22.66%	2,765	24.51%
Christian	3,690	44.95%	4,950	59.35%	7,435	72.61%	7,775	68.93%
Muslim	110	1.34%	30	0.36%	15	0.15%	60	0.53%
Hindu	45	0.55%	30	0.36%	100	0.98%	95	0.84%
Buddhist	35	0.43%	20	0.24%	15	0.15%	55	0.49%
Sikh	20	0.24%	55	0.66%	330	3.22%	505	4.48%
Indigenous spirituality	10	0.12%	0	0%	N/A	N/A	N/A	N/A
Jewish	0	0%	0	0%	0	0%	10	0.09%
Other religion	75	0.91%	0	0%	10	0.1%	15	0.13%
Total responses	8,210	99.68%	8,340	100.06%	10,240	99.56%	11,280	99.78%

== Controversies ==
The Alcan project was not free from controversy. Politicians, aboriginal groups, farmers and residents of the Nechako Lakes District opposed the contractual release of provincial resources with the profits going to a private firm. Many individuals and groups protested the flooding caused by the creation of the new reservoir, with the destruction of homesteads, villages, burial grounds, millions of board feet of prime timber, and the disruption of prime fish habitat on the Nechako River.

In the late 1980s, the company began work on the Kemano Completion Project which would have doubled the generating capacity of the Kemano plant. After Alcan had already bored a second tunnel through the mountain and extended the generating station within the mountain, the provincial government of the day called a halt to the project for a variety of reasons. Having invested over $500 million into the project, Alcan took the provincial government to court. This controversy was settled when Alcan and the provincial government signed the 1997 KCP agreement.

Most of the first decade of the twenty-first century saw the District of Kitimat in court with the Provincial Government over the electricity rights granted to Alcan and its obligations to the Province and to the District.

Rio Tinto Alcan plans to increase the output of its Kitimat smelter from 250,000 MT/Yr to 400,000 MT/Yr and initially committed $300 million to this effort. Since late 2008, relations between Rio Tinto Alcan and the District appear to have become more cordial, with the two parties working to achieve modernization of the aluminum facilities. In December 2011, Rio Tinto Alcan announced its investment of $2.7 billion to complete the modernization of the smelter.

== Media ==
=== Newspapers ===
- Kitimat Northern Sentinel
- Skeena Reporter

=== Radio ===
- FM 92.1 – CFNR-FM, First Nations community/ classic rock (Terrace)
- FM 92.9 – CJFW-FM-1, country (repeats CJFW-FM, Terrace)
- FM 97.7 – CKTK-FM, hot adult contemporary
- FM 100.3 – CFKI-FM, CBC Radio 2 (repeats CBU-FM, Vancouver)
- FM 101.1 – CBUK-FM, CBC Radio One (repeats CFPR, Prince Rupert)
- FM 105.1 – CBUF-FM-5, Première Chaîne (repeats CBUF-FM, Vancouver)

=== Television ===
- Channel 3 – CFTK-TV, CTV 2 affiliate (Terrace)
- DTBS cable channel 10

== Notable people ==
- Benjamin Arthur – actor
- Kayla Czaga – poet
- Michael Craven – sports executive and author.
- Mark Fitzpatrick – former NHL goaltender
- Jon Kelly – swimmer who competed at the 1988 Summer Olympics
- Wayne Kelly – swimmer who competed at the 1984 Summer Olympics
- Bill Leeb – musician and record producer
- Don Nachbaur – professional ice hockey player and coach
- Rod Pelley – professional ice hockey player
- Alison Redford – lawyer and former premier of Alberta
- Bill Riley – professional ice hockey player
- Eden Robinson – author
- Ellis Ross – politician and former Haisla Nation Chief Councillor; born in Kitimat and raised in nearby Kitamaat Village.
- Jeff Staples – professional ice hockey player
- Benjamin Thorne – race walker

== See also ==
- List of francophone communities in British Columbia
- List of Panamax ports
- Kitlope Indian Reserve No. 16
- 1976 CASAW wildcat strike
- 2021 Kitimat smelter strike
