= Stuart River Provincial Park =

Provincial park in British Columbia

- IUCN category II (national park)
- Location within British Columbia
- Interactive map of Stuart River Provincial Park
- Location: British Columbia, Canada
- Nearest city: Vanderhoof
- Coordinates: 54°03′51″N 123°33′29″W
- Area: 209.48 km^{2} (80.88 sq mi)
- Established: June 28, 1999
- Governing body: BC Parks

Stuart River Provincial Park is a provincial park in British Columbia, Canada. It is located in two sections north and northwest of Vanderhoof along the Stuart River southeast of Stuart Lake and the city of Fort St. James. The upper section is located at 54°13′20″N 124°00′00″W and comprises c.7391 ha. while the lower, eastern section is centred at 54°03′00″N 123°37′00″W and comprises c.3390 ha. and is within the Greater Prince George area. The upper site, which is located around the confluence of the Stuart and Nechako Rivers, includes the site of Chinlac, a Dakelh village whose inhabitants were massacred and enslaved by the Tsilhqot'in of Anahim Lake c. 1745.

== See also ==
- Nechako Canyon Protected Area
