= Fort St. James (Perison) Airport =

Airport in British Columbia, Canada

- IATA: none; ICAO: CYJM

Summary
- Airport type: Public
- Operator: District of Fort St. James
- Location: Fort St. James, British Columbia
- Time zone: PST (UTC−08:00)
  - Summer (DST): PDT (UTC−07:00)
- Elevation AMSL: 2,364 ft / 721 m
- Coordinates: 54°23′50″N 124°15′46″W

Map
- Location in British Columbia

Runways
Direction	Length		Surface
Direction	ft	m	Surface
10/28	4,270	1,301	Asphalt
- Source

Fort St. James (Perison) Airport (ICAO: CYJM) is about 2.4 nautical miles (4.4 km; 2.8 mi) south of Fort St. James, British Columbia, Canada.

== Earlier activity ==
In September 1929, Wilhelm A. Joers landed his Junkers F 13 on Stuart Lake, where heavy waves severely damaged the floats and broke the wooden engine mounts. Dragged onto the beach, the plane was parked for the winter. By the spring, the aircraft had been vandalized and was abandoned.

The Air Land Manufacturing Co bought two Junker F 13s in May 1930, basing one at Six Mile (Tabor) Lake, east of Prince George. The plane flew to Fort St. James on several occasions. On crashing into McConnell Lake in 1932, the wreckage lay abandoned for decades, before eventual salvage and initial restoration.

In February 1931, engine trouble forced the other Junker to land on the Driftwood River northwest of Takla Lake. That June, a salvage crew rafted the plane to Fort St. James, where wheels were fitted. For the flight to Vanderhoof, the aircraft was stripped to bare essentials prior to takeoff from two tennis courts near the Hudson's Bay Company (HBC) store.

In 1937, Grant McConachie's United Air Transport began a Prince George–Fort St. James–Takla Landing airmail route. Russ Baker left that company to manage the Canadian Airways base at Fort St. James. After World War II, Baker formed Central British Columbia Airways (later part of Pacific Coastal Airlines) at Fort St. James and secured a Forest Service contract.

Over the following years, a number of local air services were seaplane based. Aviation was primarily smaller planes on floats or skis. Cassiar Ranch, just outside the village, handled the occasional plane on wheels. Over time, helicopters and better roads phased out the bush pilots.

In 1959, Northern Mountain Airlines bought a second plane and based it at Fort St. James. In 1961, the company bought a further plane for the base. Subsequently, a mail carrier licence was issued to service several remote settlements, comprising twice monthly deliveries from the base. In 1966, the airline received a licence to operate a commercial helicopter charter service at Fort St. James, serving the mining and pulp developments of the mountainous area. The helicopter also operated from the float plane base. By 1967, the company was the largest charter air service in central BC, largely operating float planes. In 1969, the airline commenced scheduled Prince George–Fort St. James flights.

In 1971, the operations of Northern Mountain Airlines fixed wing fleet and Thunderbird Airlines fleet merged to form Northern Thunderbird Air (NTA). Northern Mountain Airlines continued purely as a helicopter operation.

By 1974, the curtailment of exploration projects by mining firms was significantly impacting the profitability of NTA and Northern Mountain Helicopters.

== Perison airstrip ==
In 1964, a gravel airstrip built on land donated by Harold Perison founded the airport.

During the early 1970s, Harrison Airways provided tri-weekly scheduled services, which linked with Vanderhoof, Burns Lake, and Vancouver. Although Northern Mountain had been operating from the lake as late as 1970, the base had moved to the airstrip by 1977, where NTA not only leased and operated the airport, but also provided navigation, communication, and terminal facilities. About that time, scheduled services to the airport ceased.

In 1991, the weather station closed. In 1994, the airport received a grant to extend the runway from 853 by 15 metres (2,800 by 50 ft) to 1,219 by 23 metres (4,000 by 75 ft). In 1995, the paving of the 1,200-metre (4,000 ft) runway broadened the use to corporate jets and medevacs.

In 2004, the airport received a $10,000 grant to revise and update the development plan.

The airport helipad has been used three times more often than the hospital one in transporting patients.

In 2021, the District of Fort St. James, the airport operator, began planning to extend airport availability beyond daylight hours and favourable weather conditions. The absence of through (runway) lighting made nighttime use impossible. The lack of a deicing capability limited all-season suitability.

In 2023, the airport received a $2 million grant for the runway end safety area, lighting improvements, and developing a master plan.

== Water aerodrome ==
In 1981, a one-third scale Junkers W 34 was mounted on a pedestal at the waterfront.

The Fort St. James/Stuart River Water Aerodrome (TC LID: CAZ6), which is operated by Tsayta Aviation, is adjacent to the town on the Stuart River.

== Accidents and incidents ==
- October 2013: A Cessna 180 floatplane was severely damaged when making an emergency landing. Choosing the grassed area beside the runway, the pilot clipped a wood pile, crumpling the plane.
- March 2015: A Beechcraft 1900 struck a moose on landing, dislodging the right-side engine and breaking the propellers. The only injuries were the moose, which died.
