= John Stuart (explorer) =

Canadian explorer and politician

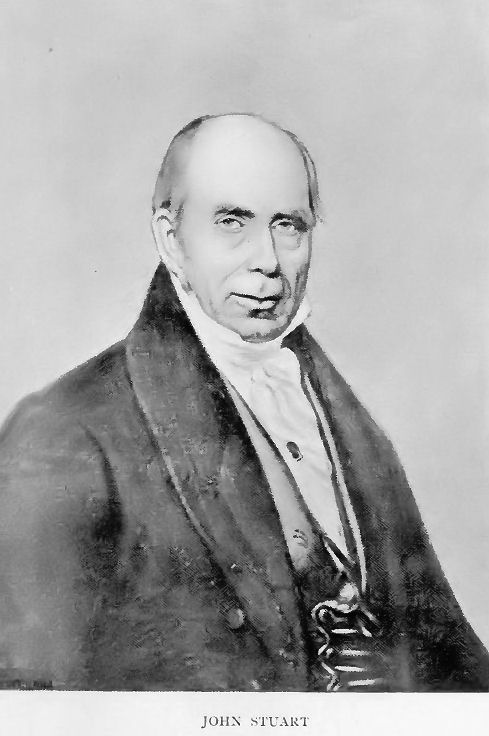

John Stuart (12 September 1780 – 14 January 1847) was a 19th-century Scottish–Canadian explorer and fur trader. He was a partner in the North West Company and Chief Factor of the Hudson's Bay Company. Stuart is best known as Simon Fraser's lieutenant who participated in his explorations of present-day British Columbia from 1805 to 1808. Fraser named Stuart River and Stuart Lake in British Columbia for his friend. Stuart was the uncle of Lord Strathcona.

== Background ==
John Stuart was born at Upper Strathspey, Moray. He was the second son of Donald Stuart (b.c.1740) of Leanchoil, then a farm situated on the edge of the Abernethy Forest, and his wife, Janet Grant (b.1743), daughter of Robert Grant of Cromdale. John Stuart's grandfather (brother of the 1st Laird of Cuilt) was descended from the 1st Laird of Auchtow, son of the Duncan MacRobert Stewart, 3rd Laird of Glenogle, Perthshire. As a Jacobite, his grandfather is thought after the Battle of Culloden to have sought refuge under the protection of Clan Grant in Moray, as he was originally from Balquhidder, Perthshire. John's mother was descended from the Chief of Clan Grant of Castle Grant and was a close cousin of the Robert Grant who co-founded the North West Company. John's sister, Barbera, was the mother of Lord Strathcona, and it was Stuart who had attained for him his first role in the Hudson's Bay Company.

== Canada ==
John's brother was commissioned as a lieutenant in the 38th (1st Staffordshire) Regiment of Foot, but rather than following him, John joined the North West Company in 1796, perhaps under the auspices of Roderick Mackenzie (cousin of Sir Alexander Mackenzie) who had known him as a boy.

Stuart and James McDougall were the clerks who joined Fraser in his explorations. Stuart was Simon Fraser's lieutenant and, in many ways, was the real leader of the expedition. After Fraser returned to his work in the Athabasca Department in 1809, Stuart was placed in charge of the New Caledonia District from its headquarters at Fort St. James, located on what would be named after him as Stuart Lake. In this position, Stuart was instrumental in establishing a number of new posts, most notably Kamloops House. He was also instrumental in disrupting competition by John Jacob Astor's Pacific Fur Company. Stuart became a partner in the North West Company in 1813 and a Chief factor in the Hudson's Bay Company after its merger with the North West Company in 1821.

Stuart is noted for his exploration of Fraser Lake, where he and Fraser built a post, now known as Fort Fraser. Stuart Lake and Stuart River, both in British Columbia are named after him. According to Father Adrien-Gabriel Morice, a missionary and historian of northern British Columbia, Stuart "seems to have been one of those well-meaning men who, unconscious of their own idiosyncrasies, make life a burden to others".

At Stuart's initiative, his nephew Donald Smith (later Baron Mt. Royal and Strathcona) was persuaded to come to Canada, where he would play an instrumental role in the building of the Canadian Pacific Railway.

Stuart returned to Scotland in 1836 and died on 14 January 1847, at Springfield House, near Elgin.

== Family ==
He married Catherine Lavalle and had two sons. He also had a daughter, Isabel, in 1802 whose mother is unknown. In 1827 John Stuart took another country wife, Mary Taylor born 1796. She joined him in Scotland in 1836 but because he withdrew his promise to marry her formally she returned to Rupert's Land in 1838. There was considerable litigation over Stuart's legacy to her, which Stuart's sisters managed to have reduced from L500 to L350. All of his children were born in Canada, and it is believed that they remained there after his departure for Scotland.

- Isabel Stuart, born in 1802
- Donald Stuart, after 1802. He married while in America and had two sons who died relatively young, the older of the two being a lieutenant in the 78th (Highlanders) Regiment who fought in the Crimean War.
- John Stuart, after 1802. It is not known if John remained in Canada or returned to Scotland with his father, nor is it known if he married or had any children.

== See also ==
- Matooskie, a First Nations woman placed under Stuart's guardianship
