= Glencoe House =

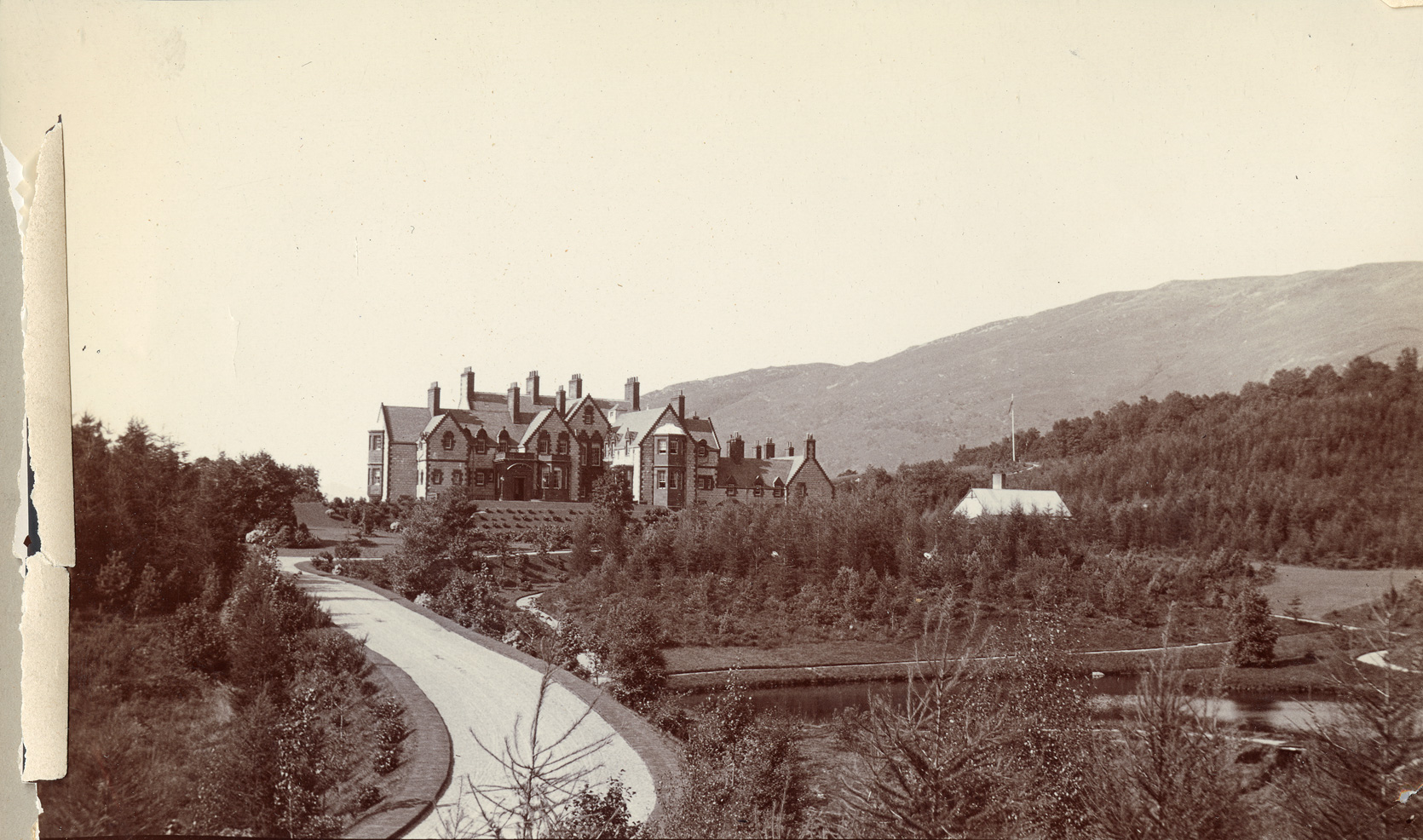
- Glencoe House

- Shown in Lochaber

Geography
- Location: Glencoe, Scotland, United Kingdom
- Coordinates: 56.6871°N 5.0997°W

Organisation
- Care system: Public NHS
- Type: Specialist

Services
- Speciality: Geriatric hospital

History
- Founded: 1945
- Closed: 2009

Links
- Lists: Hospitals in Scotland

Glencoe House is a category B listed four-storey Victorian estate house in Glencoe, Lochaber, Highland, Scotland.

== History ==
Designed by Rowand Anderson, the house was built in 1895 by Lord Strathcona for his wife, Isabella. It became a military hospital during the Second World War and, after the war, served as a maternity hospital until the 1960s when it became a hospital for geriatric patients; it then closed in 2009.

The property was put up for sale after local people failed to raise the £450,000 necessary to buy it under the Land Reform Act, having been given only five months to raise the £1.5M necessary to buy and restore the building. Unknown to the South Lochaber Community Company the Big Lottery Fund proceeds were being diverted to the London Olympics and the funding request was denied. It was sold in 2011 to a private buyer and after a restoration it was reopened as a hotel in August 2012.

== See also ==
- Glencoe Lochan
