= Simon Fraser (explorer) =

Canadian explorer (1776–1862)

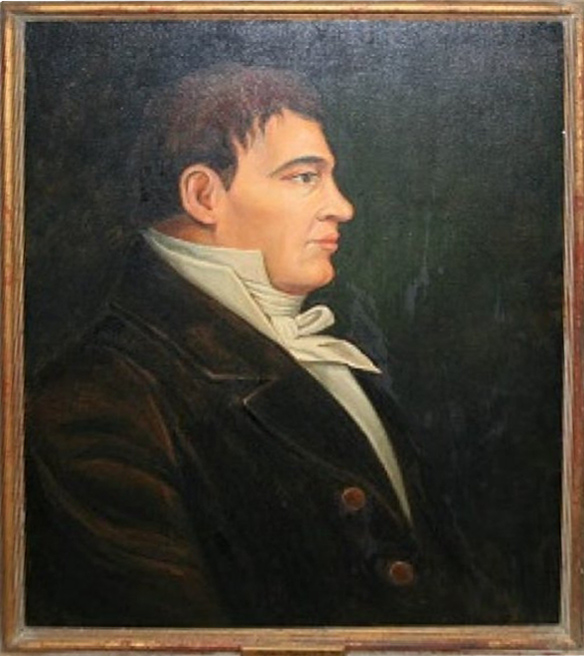
- Pre-1825 portrait of Fraser
- Born: 20 May 1776; Hoosick, Province of New York, British America
- Died: August 18, 1862 (aged 86); St. Andrews West, Canada
- Occupations: Wintering Partner in the North West Company; explorer; fur trader
- Spouse: Catherine McDonell
- Children: Nine altogether, one died at infancy
- Parent(s): Isabella Grant and Simon Fraser II

Signature
- Military Service
- Allegiance: Upper Canada
- Branch: Canadian Militia
- Service years: 1837-38
- Rank: Captain
- Unit: 1st Stormont Militia
- Conflicts: Rebellion of 1838

Simon Fraser (20 May 1776 – 18 August 1862) was a Canadian explorer and fur trader who charted much of what is now the Canadian province of British Columbia. He also built the first European settlement in British Columbia.

Employed by the Montreal-based North West Company, he had been by 1805 put in charge of all of the company's operations west of the Rocky Mountains. He was responsible for building that area's first trading posts, and in 1808, he explored what is now known as the Fraser River, which bears his name. Fraser's exploratory efforts were partly responsible for Canada's boundary later being established at the 49th parallel (after the War of 1812) since he, as a British subject, was the first European to establish permanent settlements in the area. According to the historian Alexander Begg, Fraser "was offered a knighthood but declined the title due to his limited wealth."

== Early life ==
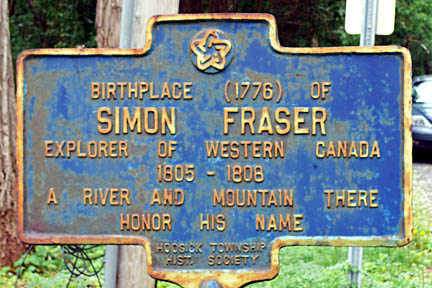
This historic marker is located in front of Fraser's birthplace home. The home is still standing in Mapletown, NY, one-half mile north of NY Route 7 on Rensselaer County of Mapletown, Hoosick, New York.

Fraser was born on 20 May 1776 in the village of Mapletown, Hoosick, New York. He was the eighth and youngest child of Captain Simon Fraser (d.1779), of the 84th Highland Regiment, and Isabella Grant, daughter of the Laird of Daldregan. Captain Simon Fraser grew up at his family's seat, Guisachan (Scottish Gaelic: 'Giùthsachan'), as the second son of William Fraser (d.1755), 8th Laird of Guisachan and 3rd Laird of Culbokie, by his wife, Margaret, daughter of John McDonell, 4th Laird of Ardnabie. The Frasers of Guisachan and Culbokie were descended from a younger brother of the 10th Chief of the Frasers of Lovat.

Simon's father came with his regiment to North America in 1773 and died in prison after being captured during the Battle of Bennington (1777). After the war ended, Simon's mother was assisted by her brother-in-law, Captain John Fraser, who had been appointed Chief Justice of the Montreal district.

== Fur trade ==
In 1789 at the age of 14, Fraser moved to Montreal for additional schooling, where two of his uncles were active in the fur trade, in which his kinsman, Simon McTavish, was the undisputed leading figure. In 1790, he was apprenticed to the North West Company.

== Exploration west of the Rockies ==
In 1789, the North West Company had commissioned Alexander Mackenzie to find a navigable river route to the Pacific Ocean. The route he discovered in 1793 — ascending the West Road River and descending the Bella Coola River — opened up new sources of fur but proved to be too difficult to be practicable as a trading route to the Pacific. Fraser was given responsibility for extending operations to the country west of the Rockies in 1805. Mackenzie’s expeditions had been primarily reconnaissance trips, while Fraser’s assignment, by contrast, reflected a definite decision to build trading posts and take possession of the country, as well as to explore travel routes.

=== Ascending the Peace River and establishing posts ===
In the autumn of 1805, Fraser began ascending the Peace River, establishing the trading post of Rocky Mountain Portage House (present-day Hudson's Hope) just east of the Peace River Canyon of the Rocky Mountains. That winter Fraser and his crew pushed through the mountains and ascended the Parsnip and Pack Rivers, establishing Trout Lake Fort (later renamed Fort McLeod) at present-day McLeod Lake. This was the first permanent European settlement west of the Rockies in present-day Canada. The name given by Fraser to this territory was New Caledonia in honor of his ancestral homeland of Scotland. Further explorations by Fraser's assistant James McDougall resulted in the discovery of Carrier Lake, now known as Stuart Lake. In the heart of territory inhabited by the aboriginal Carrier or Dakelh nation, this area proved to be a lucrative locale for fur trading and so a post, Fort St. James, was built on its shore in 1806. From here, Fraser sent another assistant, John Stuart, west to Fraser Lake. Later, the two men would build another post there which is now known as Fort Fraser. Fraser later sent the expedition's logbook keeper, Jules-Maurice Quesnel, up the river at the forks to see what was there and ended up naming the Quesnel River and the Quesnel Lake after him.

=== Delays and the founding of Fort George (Prince George) ===
Fraser had found out from the Indigenous people that the Fraser River, the route by which Mackenzie had ascended the West Road River, could be reached by descending the Stuart River, which drained Stuart Lake, and then descending the Nechako River to its confluence with the Fraser. It had been Fraser's plan to navigate the length of the river which now bears his name. Fraser and others believed that it was, in fact, the Columbia River, the mouth of which had been explored in 1792 by Robert Gray.

Unfortunately, Fraser's plan to begin the journey in 1806 had to be abandoned because of a lack of men and supplies, as well as the occurrence of local famine. Fraser would not be resupplied until the autumn of 1807 and so his journey could not be undertaken until the following spring. In the interval, Fraser contented himself with a journey to the confluence of the Nechako and Fraser Rivers. There he established a new post named Fort George (now known as Prince George), which would become the starting point for his trip downstream.

=== Descending the Fraser River ===
From the outset, the aboriginal inhabitants warned Fraser that the river below was nearly impassable. A party of twenty-four left Fort George in four canoes on May 28, 1808. They passed the West Road River where Mackenzie had turned west and on the first of June ran the rapids of the Cottonwood Canyon where a canoe became stranded and had to be pulled out of the canyon with a rope. They procured horses from the Indigenous peoples to help with the portages, but the carrying-places were scarcely safer than the rapids. They passed the mouth of the Chilcotin River on the 5th and entered a rapid couvert where the river was completely enclosed by cliffs. The next day the river was found to be completely impassable. The canoes and superfluous goods were cached and on the 11th the party set out on foot, each man carrying about 80 pounds. On the 14th they reached a large village, possibly near Lillooet where they were able to trade for two canoes. On the 19th, they reached a village at the mouth of the Thompson River, where they obtained canoes for the rest of the party. After more rapids and portages and losing one canoe but no men, they reached North Bend where they again had to abandon their canoes. In places, they used an aboriginal path that had been made by poles set on the side of the gorge (probably somewhere near Hells Gate). On the 28th, they left the Fraser Canyon near Yale where the river becomes navigable. Escorted by friendly Indigenous people and well-fed on salmon, they reached the sea on the second of July. Fraser took the latitude as 49°. Since he knew that the mouth of the Columbia was at 46°, the river that he was following was clearly not the Columbia.

Fraser proved adept at establishing friendly relations with the tribes he met and was careful to have them send word to tribes downstream of his impending arrival and good intentions. For the most part, this tactic was effective, but Fraser encountered a hostile reception by the Musqueam people as he approached the lower reaches of the river at present-day Vancouver. Their hostile pursuit of Fraser and his men prevented him from getting more than a glimpse of the Strait of Georgia on July 2, 1808. A dispute with the neighboring Kwantlen people led to a pursuit of Fraser and his men that was not broken off until near present-day Hope.

Returning to Fort George proved to be an even more perilous exercise, as the hostility that Fraser and his crew encountered from the aboriginal communities near the mouth of the river spread upstream. The ongoing hostility and threats to the lives of the Europeans resulted in a near mutiny by Fraser's crew, who wanted to escape overland. Quelling the revolt, Fraser and his men continued north upstream from present-day Yale, arriving in Fort George on August 6, 1808. The journey upstream took thirty-seven days. In total it took Fraser and his crew 2 1/2 months to travel from Fort George to Musqueam and back.

== Fraser and the Battle of Seven Oaks ==
Fraser was just thirty-two years old when he completed the establishment of a permanent European settlement in New Caledonia through the epic journey to the mouth of the river that would one day bear his name. He would go on to spend another eleven years actively engaged in the North West Company's fur trade, and was reassigned to the Athabasca Department, where he remained until 1814. For much of this time, he was in charge of the Mackenzie River District. After this, he was assigned to the Red River Valley area, where he was caught up in the conflict between the North West Company and Thomas Douglas, Lord Selkirk, a controlling shareholder of the Hudson's Bay Company who had established the Red River Colony. The conflict culminated in the Battle of Seven Oaks in June 1816, resulting in the death of the colony's governor, Robert Semple, and nineteen others. Though not involved in the attack, Fraser was one of the partners arrested by Lord Selkirk at Fort William. He was taken in September to Montreal, where he was promptly released on bail. Fraser was back at Fort William in 1817 when the North West Company regained possession of the post, but that was evidently his last appearance in the fur trade. The following year, Fraser and five other partners were acquitted of all charges related to the incident in the dead colony.

== Later life ==
Fraser settled on land near present-day Cornwall, Ontario, and married Catherine McDonnell on June 2, 1820. He spent the remainder of his life pursuing various enterprises, none with much success. He served as captain of the 1st Regiment of the Stormont Militia during the Rebellions of 1837. According to historian Alexander Begg, Fraser "was offered a knighthood but declined the title due to his limited wealth."

He had nine children altogether; one died in infancy. Fraser was one of the last surviving partners of the North West Company when he died on August 18, 1862. His wife died the next day, and they were buried in a single grave in the Roman Catholic cemetery at St. Andrew's West. Begg quotes Sandford Fleming in an address to the Royal Society of Canada in 1889 as saying that Fraser died poor.

An account of Fraser's explorations can be found in his published journals: W. Kaye Lamb, The Letters and Journals of Simon Fraser, 1806-1808. Toronto, The MacMillan Company of Canada Limited, 1960.

== List of British Columbia communities founded by Fraser ==
- Hudson's Hope – (1805)
- McLeod Lake – (1805)
- Fort St. James – (1806)
- Fort Fraser – (1806)
- Prince George – (1807)

== List of place names, institutions and other named for Fraser ==
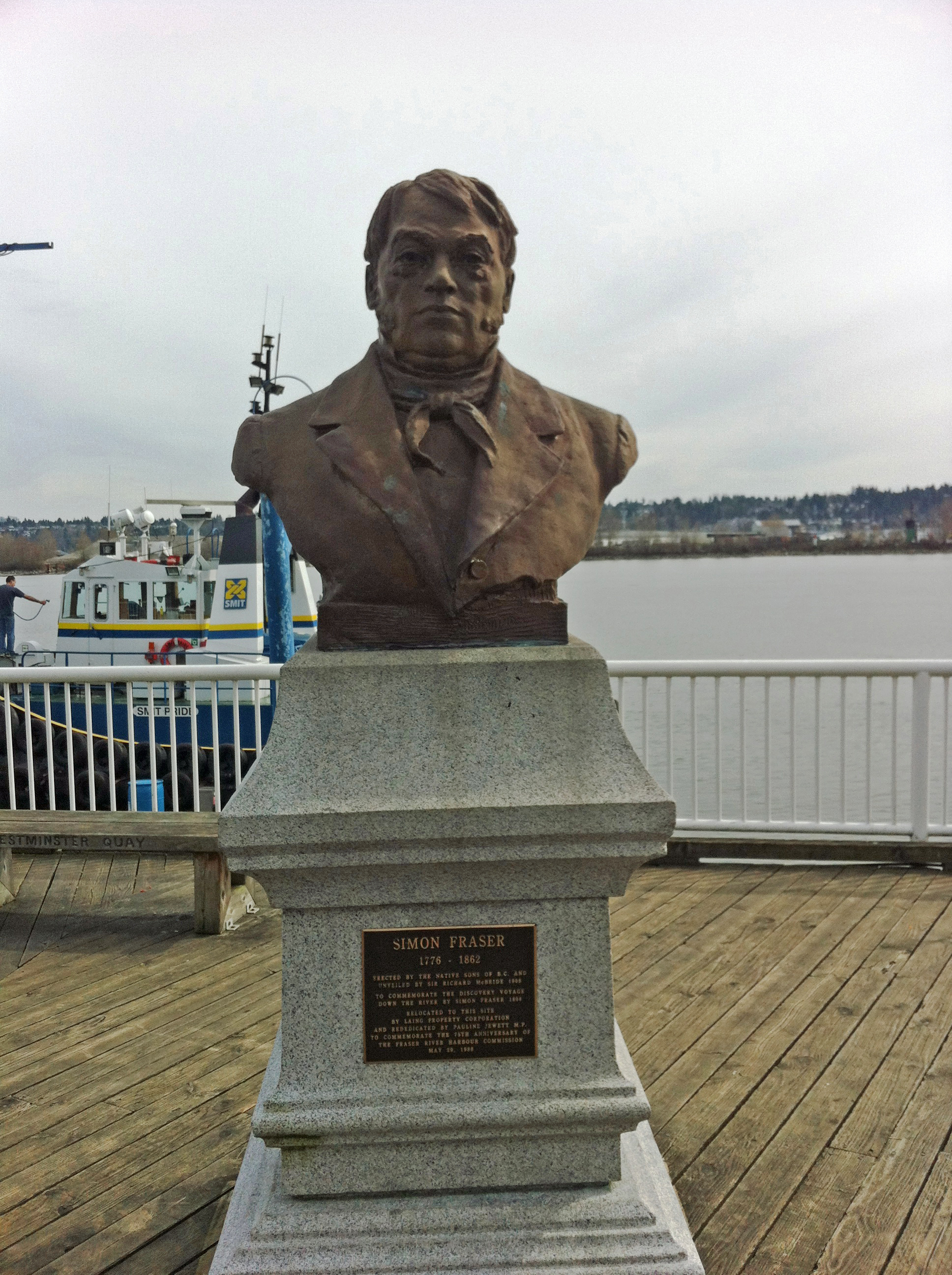
A bust of Fraser, located by the river that bears his name, in New Westminster, British Columbia

- The Fraser River, named for him by the explorer David Thompson.
- Fraser Lake, a lake in north-central British Columbia.
- Fort Fraser, just east of Fraser Lake.
- Simon Fraser University, in Burnaby, British Columbia
- Simon Fraser Elementary School in Vancouver, British Columbia
- Simon Fraser School in Calgary, Alberta
- The Simon Fraser Bridge in Prince George over the Fraser River
- The Simon Fraser Rose, (explorer series) developed by Agriculture and Agri-Food Canada, was named in his honor.
- Fraser Squadron, Royal Military College of Canada
- CCGS Simon Fraser, a former Canadian Coast Guard vessel
