= Donald Smith, 1st Baron Strathcona and Mount Royal =

Canadian businessman, politician and philanthropist (1820–1914)

The Right Honourable The Lord Strathcona and Mount Royal PC GCMG GCVO PC DL FRS
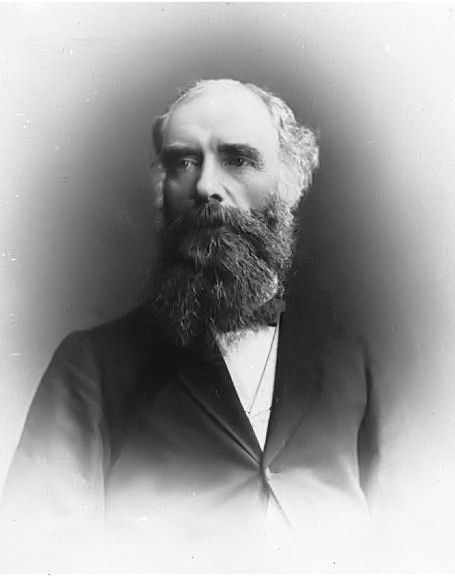
- Smith c. 1890

Canadian High Commissioner to the United Kingdom
- In office 1896–1914
- Prime Minister: Charles Tupper; Wilfrid Laurier; Robert Borden
- Preceded by: Charles Tupper
- Succeeded by: George Perley

Member of Parliament for Montreal West
- In office 22 February 1887 – 22 June 1896
- Preceded by: Matthew Hamilton Gault
- Succeeded by: District abolished

Member of Parliament for Selkirk
- In office 2 March 1871 – 13 May 1880
- Preceded by: District established
- Succeeded by: Thomas Scott

11th President of the Bank of Montreal
- In office 1887–1905
- Prime Minister: Sir Wilfrid Laurier
- Preceded by: Sir George Drummond
- Succeeded by: C. F. Smithers

26th Governor of the Hudson's Bay Company
- In office 1889–1914
- Prime Minister: Sir Wilfrid Laurier; Sir Robert Borden
- Preceded by: Eden Colvile
- Succeeded by: Sir Thomas Skinner

3rd Chancellor of McGill University
- In office 1889–1914
- Preceded by: James Ferrier
- Succeeded by: Sir William Macdonald

11th Rector of the University of Aberdeen
- In office 1899–1902
- Preceded by: Charles Gordon
- Succeeded by: Charles Ritchie

2nd Chancellor of the University of Aberdeen
- In office 1903–1914
- Preceded by: Charles Gordon-Lennox
- Succeeded by: Victor Bruce

Personal details
- Born: Donald Alexander Smith; 6 August 1820 Forres, Scotland
- Died: 21 January 1914 (aged 93) London, England
- Resting place: Highgate Cemetery, London
- Citizenship: British subject
- Spouse: Isabella Sophia Hardisty (m. 1853; died 1913)
- Children: Margaret Howard, 2nd Baroness Strathcona and Mount Royal
- Occupation: Diplomat, businessman
- Known for: Driving the CPR's Last Spike
- Awards: Albert Medal (1912)

Donald Alexander Smith, 1st Baron Strathcona and Mount Royal, PC, GCMG, GCVO PC DL FRS (6 August 1820 – 21 January 1914), known as Sir Donald A. Smith between May 1886 and August 1897, was a Scottish-born Canadian businessman who became one of the British Empire's foremost builders and philanthropists. He became commissioner, governor and principal shareholder of the Hudson's Bay Company. He was president of the Bank of Montreal and with his first cousin, George Stephen (later Lord Mount Stephen), co-founded the Canadian Pacific Railway. He was elected to the Legislative Assembly of Manitoba and afterwards represented Montreal in the House of Commons of Canada. He was Canadian High Commissioner to the United Kingdom from 1896 to 1914. He was chairman of Burmah Oil and the Anglo-Persian Oil Company. He was chancellor of McGill University (1889–1914) and the University of Aberdeen.

King Edward VII called him "Uncle Donald". His estate was valued at $5.5 million (equivalent to $151 million in 2025). During his lifetime, and including the bequests left after his death, he gave away just over $7.5 million-plus a further £1 million (not including private gifts and allowances) to a huge variety of charitable causes across Canada, the United Kingdom and the United States. He personally raised Strathcona's Horse, who saw their first action in the Second Boer War. He funded the building of Leanchoil Hospital. He and his first cousin, Lord Mount Stephen, purchased the land and then each gave $1 million to the City of Montreal to construct and maintain the Royal Victoria Hospital. He endowed the Lord Strathcona Medal and donated generously to McGill University, Aberdeen University, the Victoria University of Manchester, Yale University, the Prince of Wales Hospital Fund and the Imperial Institute. At McGill, he started the Donalda Program for the purpose of providing higher education for Canadian women, building the Royal Victoria College on Sherbrooke Street for that purpose in 1886. He also built the Strathcona Medical Building at McGill and endowed its chairs in pathology and hygiene.

== Early life ==
Born 6 August 1820, on Forres High Street, in Moray, Scotland, he was the second son of Alexander Smith (1786–1841) and his wife Barbara Stuart, daughter of Donald Stuart (b.c.1740) of Leanchoil, Upper Strathspey, descended from Murdoch Stewart, 2nd Duke of Albany. His father, whose family had lived at Archiestown Cottage as crofters at Knockando, became a saddler at Forres after trying his hand at farming and soldiering. Donald was also a first cousin of the successful and notably philanthropic Grant brothers of Manchester, who were reputedly immortalised as the "Cheeryble Brothers" in Charles Dickens' book, Nicholas Nickleby. Donald's mother was the sister of the Canadian explorer John Stuart, partner of the North West Company who rose to become Chief Factor of the Hudson's Bay Company.

Smith was educated at Anderson's Free School and on leaving at age sixteen he was apprenticed to become a lawyer in the offices of Robert Watson, Town Clerk of Forres. By the age of eighteen, Smith chose another career path: offered entry into mercantile life at Manchester, and a career in the Indian Civil Service, his choice was to pattern himself on his uncle John Stuart (who had by then returned to live near Forres) who offered him a junior clerkship in the service of the Hudson's Bay Company. Smith chose to follow his uncle's career and sailed to Montreal that year.

== Hudson's Bay Company ==
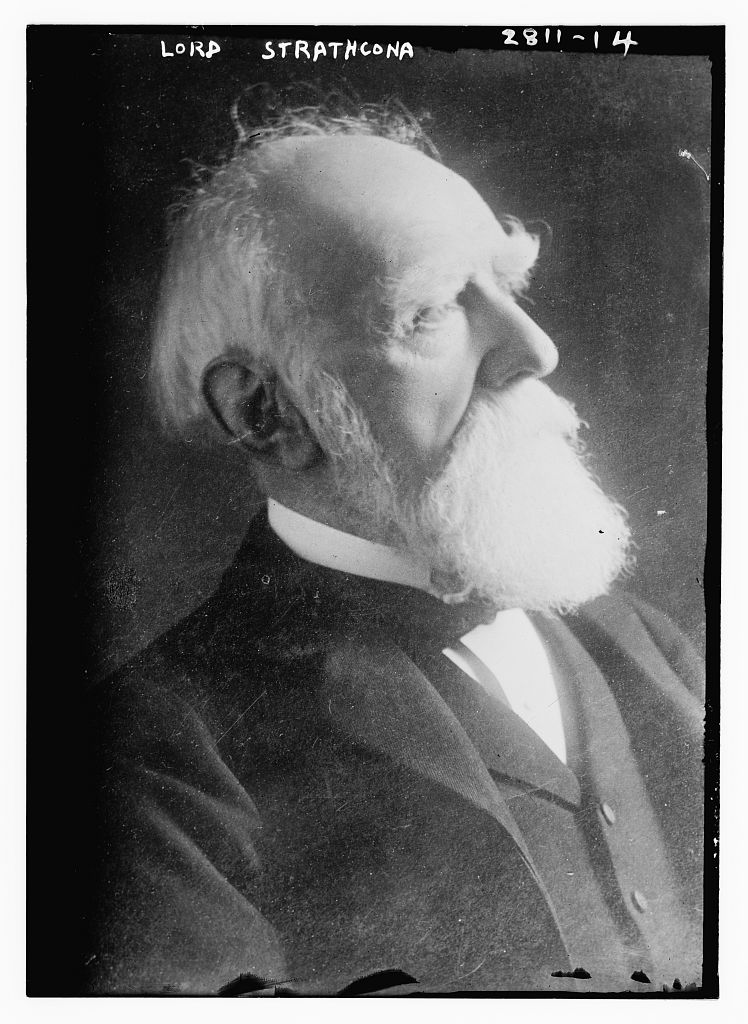
Lord Strathcona circa 1913

Smith emigrated to Lower Canada in 1838 to work for the Hudson's Bay Company (HBC), becoming a clerk for the organization in 1842. He was given administrative control over the seigneury of Mingan (in modern Labrador) in late 1843, where his innovative methods met with the disapproval of HBC governor Sir George Simpson. The Mingan post burned down in 1846, and Smith left for Montreal the following year. He returned in 1848, and remained in Labrador until the 1860s, administering the fur trade and salmon fishing within the region.

In 1862, Smith was promoted as the company's Chief Factor in charge of the Labrador district. He travelled to London in 1865, and made a favourable impression on the HBC's directors. In 1868, he was promoted to Commissioner of the Montreal department, managing the HBC's eastern operations. That same year, Smith joined with George Stephen, Richard Bladworth Angus, and Andrew Paton to establish the textile manufactory, Paton Manufacturing Company, in Sherbrooke.

In 1869, the government of John A. Macdonald held the HBC accountable for the disturbances reported in the Red River Colony, which was part of the proposed purchase of the original part of Rupert's Land from the HBC. The person in charge of HBC's nominal head office in Montreal was Smith, and he was asked by the Governor-General to investigate and write a Royal Commission report. Smith travelled to (present-day) Manitoba, and negotiated at Fort Garry with Louis Riel, who had been voted the leader of the resistance. Smith's offers, including land recognition for the Métis, led to Riel calling a Council of 40 representatives, drawn half-and-half from the Metis and the HBC settlers, for formal negotiations. Smith returned to Ottawa in early 1870, and communicated the Royal Commission on the North-West Territories, which effectively made his name in Canada and London. Smith succeeded in gaining clemency for some prisoners within the region; he was not, however, able to prevent the execution of Thomas Scott by Riel's provisional government. He was appointed that year to the office of President of the HBC's Council of the Northern Department (effectively becoming administrator of the Northwest Territories, including Manitoba).

Smith accompanied Col. Garnet Wolseley's military mission to Red River later in the year; following the end of the resistance, Wolseley appointed Smith as the Acting Governor of Assiniboia pending Lieutenant Governor Adams George Archibald's arrival in the province. Smith stayed in the region after 1870 and was responsible for negotiating the transfer of HBC land to the federal government (as well as coordinating the transfer of several specific land claims in the region). Archibald appointed Smith to his Executive Council on 20 October 1870, although this decision was subsequently overturned by the Canadian government, which ruled that Archibald had overstepped his legal authority.

== Political career ==
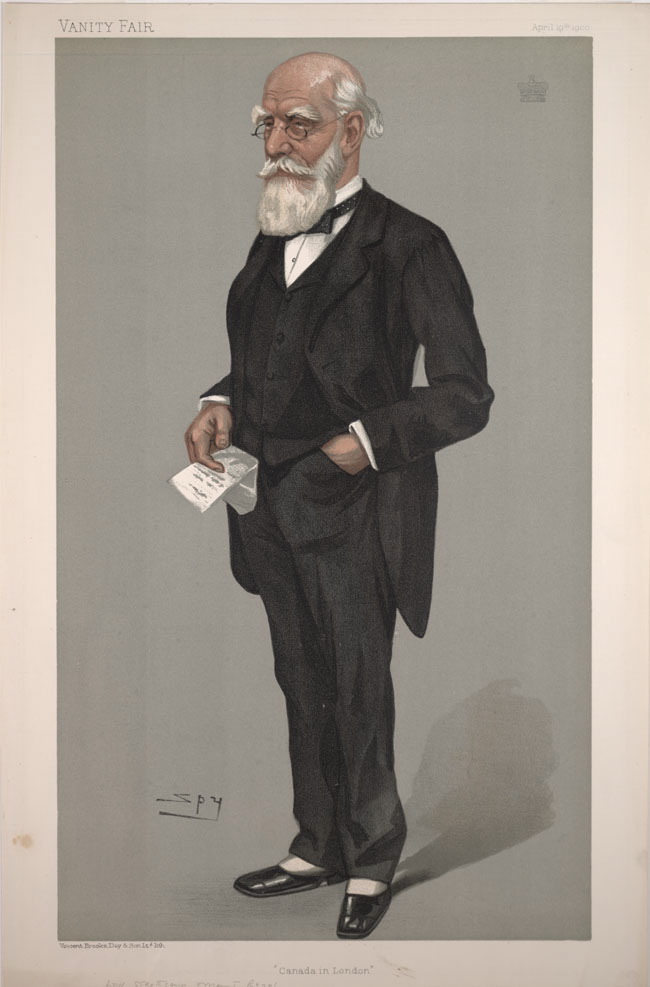
″Canada in London″ by Leslie Ward, caricature of Lord Strathcona in Vanity Fair, 1900

In Manitoba's first general election, held on 27 December 1870, Smith was elected to the provincial legislature for the riding of Winnipeg and St. John, defeating long-time HBC nemesis John Christian Schultz by 71 votes to 63. Smith was a supporter of Archibald's consensus government, and opposed Schultz's ultra-loyalist Canadian Party; there was a riot among the Ontario soldiers stationed in Winnipeg following the announcement of Smith's victory.

Politicians were allowed to serve in both the provincial and federal parliaments in this period of Manitoba history, and Smith was elected to the House of Commons of Canada for the newly formed riding of Selkirk in early 1871. He sat as an Independent Conservative, and initially supported the government of Sir John A. Macdonald. Easily re-elected in 1872, Smith was a strong defender of HBC interests in the House of Commons, and also spoke for issues concerning Manitoba and the Northwest. He helped create the Bank of Manitoba and the Manitoba Insurance Company during this period, assisted by banker Sir Hugh Allan.

In 1872 Smith was appointed to the first group of members of the Temporary North-West Council the first governing assembly of the North-West Territories. Smith was one of the few people who served on two provincial/territorial legislatures and the federal parliament at the same time.

Smith broke with Macdonald in 1873, after the Prime Minister had delayed reimbursement for Smith's earlier expenses in Red River. Smith voted to censure the government in a motion over the Pacific Scandal and was thereby partly responsible for the government's defeat. Smith remained an Independent Conservative, but his relations with the official Conservative representatives were often strained in later years.

Manitoba abolished the "dual mandate" in 1873, and Smith resigned from the provincial legislature in early 1874 (the first person to do so). In the Canadian general election of 1874, Smith defeated Liberal candidate Andrew G. B. Bannatyne by 329 votes to 225. The Manitoba Free Press, at the time, suggested that Smith had encouraged Bannatyne's candidacy to prevent more serious opposition from emerging.

In 1873, the HBC separated its fur trade and land sales operations, putting Smith in charge of the latter. Smith had developed an interest in railway expansion through his work with the HBC, and in 1875 was among the incorporators of the Manitoba Western Railway. He was also a partner in the Red River Transportation Company, which gained control over the St. Paul and Pacific Railroad in March 1878. His business ventures increasingly dominated his labours, and he formally resigned as land commissioner in early 1879, though he remained a leading figure in the HBC's operations for another 30 years.

Smith faced a serious electoral challenge from former Manitoba Lieutenant Governor Alexander Morris in the general election of 1878. Aided on this occasion by the Manitoba Free Press, Smith defeated Morris by 555 votes to 546; local Conservative organizers protested the result, and it was overturned two years later. On 10 September 1880, Smith was defeated by former Winnipeg Mayor Thomas Scott, 735 votes to 577.

== Corporate leader ==
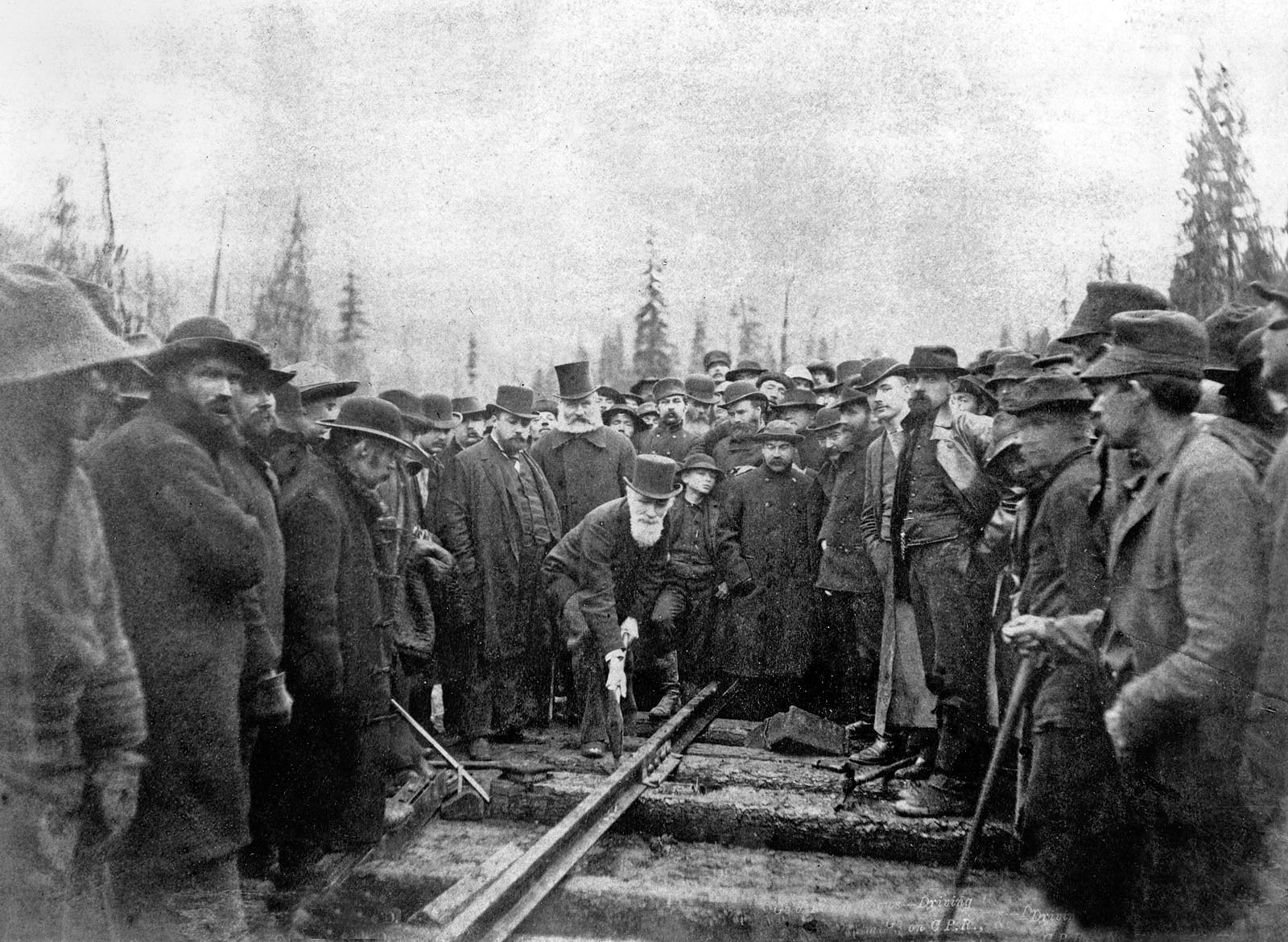
Smith drives the Last Spike of the Canadian Pacific Railway, 7 November 1885, Craigellachie, British Columbia

In May 1879, Smith became a director in the St. Paul, Minneapolis and Manitoba Railway Company, having control over 20% of its shares. He was subsequently a leading figure in the creation of the Canadian Pacific Railway, although he was not appointed as a director of the organization until 1883 because of his lingering animosity with Sir John A. Macdonald (who had again become prime minister in 1878). During his tenure on the board, Smith had the honour of driving the last spike at Craigellachie, British Columbia to complete the construction of the Canadian Pacific Railway rail line. Smith remained on the board of directors for several years, although he was by-passed for the company's presidency in 1888, in favour of William Cornelius Van Horne.

Smith became extremely wealthy through his investments, and he was involved in a myriad of Canadian and American corporations in the latter part of the 19th century. He was appointed to the board of the Bank of Montreal in 1872, became its vice-president in 1882, and was promoted to the Presidency in 1887. His leadership in real estate transactions caused Smith to become a financier, and he was thus involved in (or founded) over 80 trust structures, including the Royal Trust and Montreal Trust. He retained a significant interest in the Hudson's Bay Company throughout his life and became in 1889 Governor of the company that had made his name.

Smith was also involved in the newspaper industry in his later years. His attempt to take over the Toronto Globe in 1882 was unsuccessful, though he took effective control of the Manitoba Free Press from William Fisher Luxton in 1893. In 1889, he was the principal shareholder of the Hudson's Bay Company and was elected as its 26th governor, holding this position until his death in 1914.

== Later political career ==
Smith was re-elected to the Canadian House of Commons in 1887, in the Quebec riding of Montreal West, and once again sat as an "Independent Conservative". In the same year he received an honorary Doctor of Laws from St John's College, Cambridge. He was re-elected in the election of 1891, defeating his only opponent, James Cochrane, 4586 votes to 880. Smith remained interested in Manitoba politics, and attempted (without success) to broker a compromise between Thomas Greenway and the federal government during the Manitoba school crisis of the 1890s.

== High Commissioner ==
Prime Minister Sir Mackenzie Bowell wanted Smith to succeed him in 1896, but Smith refused. The position of Prime Minister instead went to Sir Charles Tupper, who appointed Smith as High Commissioner to the United Kingdom on 24 April 1896.

Sir Wilfrid Laurier retained Smith as High Commissioner following the Liberal election victory of 1896, although his powers were somewhat undercut. He was created Baron Strathcona and Mount Royal, of Glencoe in the County of Argyll and of Mount Royal in the Province of Quebec and Dominion of Canada, in the Peerage of the United Kingdom, on 23 August 1897, as part of the 1897 Diamond Jubilee Honours. He had already been made KCMG on 29 May 1886, promoted to GCMG on 20 May 1896, and was further made GCVO in 1908. He cooperated with Manitoba Liberal Clifford Sifton in opening the Canadian prairies to eastern-European immigration. He raised Strathcona's Horse, a private unit of Canadian soldiers, during the Second Boer War, and became one of the leading supporters of British imperialism within London. After the end of the war, he was appointed among the members of a Royal Commission set up to investigate the conduct of the Second Boer War (the Elgin Commission 1902–1903). He was involved in the creation of the Anglo-Persian Oil Company, of which he became the chairman in 1909. Lord Strathcona subsequently used his influence to make the company a major supplier of the Royal Navy.

He was granted a second creation of the Barony, with a Special Remainder in favour of his daughter Margaret Charlotte Howard, as Baron Strathcona and Mount Royal, of Mount Royal in the Province of Quebec and Dominion of Canada, and of Glencoe in the County of Argyll, on 26 June 1900.

He was Lord Rector of the University of Aberdeen (1899–1902), and he received the Freedom of the City of Aberdeen in a ceremony on 9 April 1902.

On 12 February 1902, he was appointed an Honorary Colonel of the 8th (Volunteer) Battalion, the King's (Liverpool Regiment), and the same month he received the honorary degree of Doctor of Laws (LL.D.) from the Victoria University of Manchester, in connection with the 50th jubilee of the establishment of the university. He received the honorary degree Doctor of Civil Law (DCL) from the University of Oxford in October 1902, in connection with the tercentenary of the Bodleian Library.

He was sworn in as a Member of the Imperial Privy Council in 1904. He received the Freedom of the City of Bath on 13 July 1911.

== Philanthropy ==
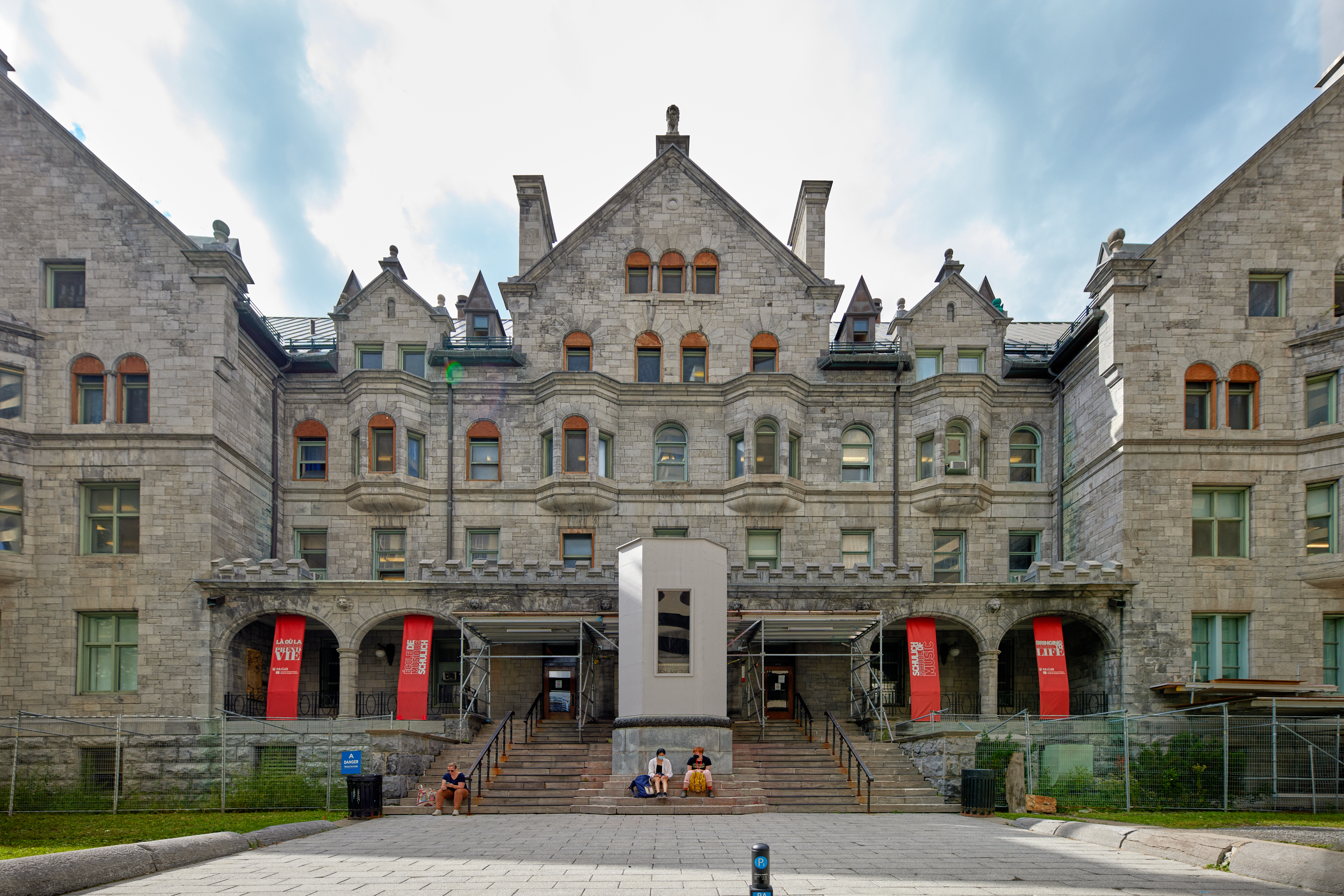
Strathcona Music Building on Sherbrooke Street, Montreal. Originally known as Royal Victoria College and was built in 1884 by Strathcona for the higher education of women.

Strathcona was a leading philanthropist in his later years, donating large sums of money to various organizations in Britain, Canada and elsewhere. His largest donations were made with George Stephen, donating the money to build the Royal Victoria Hospital in Montreal that opened its doors in 1893. Strathcona also made a major donation to McGill University in Montreal, where he helped establish a school for women in 1884 (Royal Victoria College). He was named Chancellor of McGill in 1888, and he held the post until his death. He also bequeathed funds to the Sheffield Scientific School for a science and engineering building and to support two professorships in engineering. He was awarded an honorary degree from Yale University in 1892. He contributed donations to the new University of Birmingham following representations by Joseph Chamberlain.

In 1910, Strathcona deposited in trust with the Dominion Government the sum of $500,000, bearing an annual interest of 4%, to develop citizenship and patriotism, for example in the Royal Canadian Army Cadets movement, through physical training, rifle shooting, and military drill. A Syllabus of Physical Exercises for Schools was published by the Trust in 1911. He is remembered today by the Cadets with the Lord Strathcona Medal.

== Death ==
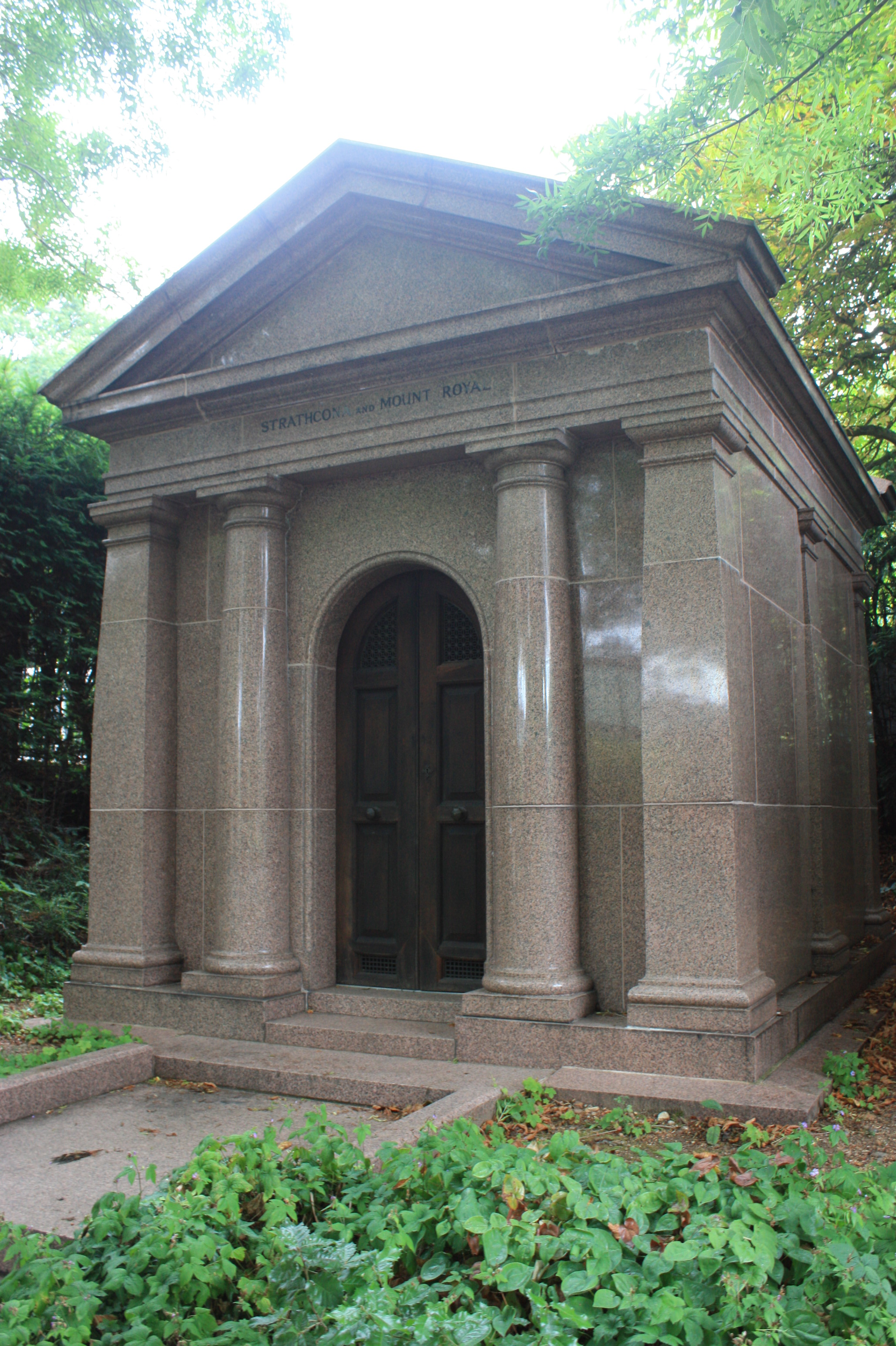
The vault of Lord Strathcona, Highgate Cemetery, London

Lord Strathcona died in 1914 in London and was buried at Highgate Cemetery. His imposing red granite vault is the first vault after entering the Eastern Cemetery. His seventy-five-year tenure with the Hudson's Bay Company remains a record.

He lived in Montreal's Golden Square Mile. In 1895, he purchased an estate in Scotland, building and living at Glencoe House. In 1905, he purchased the Island of Colonsay including Colonsay House (where his descendants still live) and the Island of Oronsay, both on the Hebridean coast of Scotland. He kept a house in London and after his appointment as Canadian High Commissioner leased Knebworth House from 1899 until his death. He was given a full state funeral at Westminster Abbey, where a memorial stands to his memory, and would have been entombed there but he preferred to rest next to his wife, who pre-deceased him by several months, in Highgate Cemetery.

His obituary in The Times of London read in part,

With no advantage of birth or fortune he made himself one of the great outstanding figures of the Empire.

== Family ==
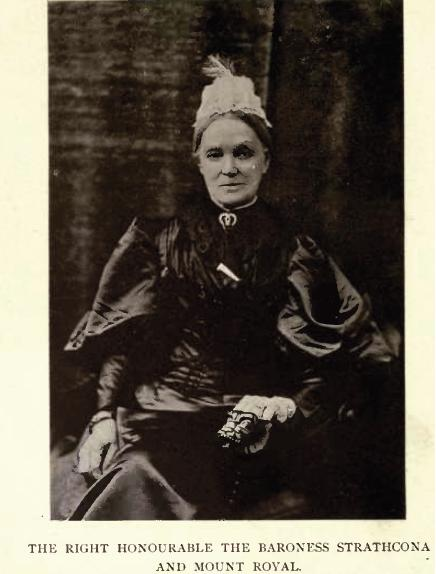
Isabella Sophia, Baroness Strathcona and Mount Royal, by William Notman

In 1853, he married Isabella Sophia Hardisty (1825–1913), daughter of Richard Hardisty (1790–1865), Chief Trader of the Hudson's Bay Company, and Margaret Sutherland (1802–1876), daughter of the Rev. John Sutherland, a native of Caithness who lived at Lachine, Quebec. Lady Strathcona's father was a native of London, England, and her mother was of Indian and Scottish parentage. Her brother was the Hon. Richard Charles Hardisty. She was presented to King Edward and Queen Alexandra, 13 March 1903, and with her daughter donated $100,000 to McGill University in Montreal to erect a new wing to its Medical Building. The couple lived at 53 Cadogan Square, London; Knebworth House; Debden Hall; Glencoe House, Scotland; Colonsay House, Scotland and 1157 Dorchester Street, in Montreal's Golden Square Mile.

Lord and Lady Strathcona were the parents of one child, the Hon. Margaret Charlotte Smith. In accordance with the special remainder to the 1900 barony, she succeeded her father as Lady Strathcona in 1914. In 1888, she married Robert Jared Bliss Howard OBE FRCS (1859–1921), son of Robert Palmer Howard (1823–1889), Dean of Medicine at McGill University.

Robert Howard and Lady Strathcona had the following children:

- The Hon. Frances Margaret Palmer Howard (born 13 February 1889, died 5 October 1958)
- The Rt Hon. Donald Sterling Palmer Howard, 3rd Baron Strathcona and Mount Royal (born 14 June 1891, died 22 February 1959)
- The Hon. Robert Henry Palmer Howard (born 1893, killed in action 8 May 1915)
- The Hon. Edith Mary Palmer Howard (born 7 April 1895, died 1979), married John Brooke Molesworth Parnell, 6th Baron Congleton on 6 April 1918
- The Hon. Sir Arthur Jared Palmer Howard, KBE CVO (born 30 May 1896, died 26 April 1971)

His Montreal home was located in the Golden Square Mile. In 1905, he bought the island of Colonsay in the Inner Hebrides, which remains in the hands of his successors today.

== Military connections ==
Lord Strathcona was offered the appointment of Honorary Colonel of the 15th Light Horse (headquartered in Calgary) in September 1909. The appointment was made official as of 24 November 1909.

== Legacy ==
=== Places ===
==== Ottawa ====
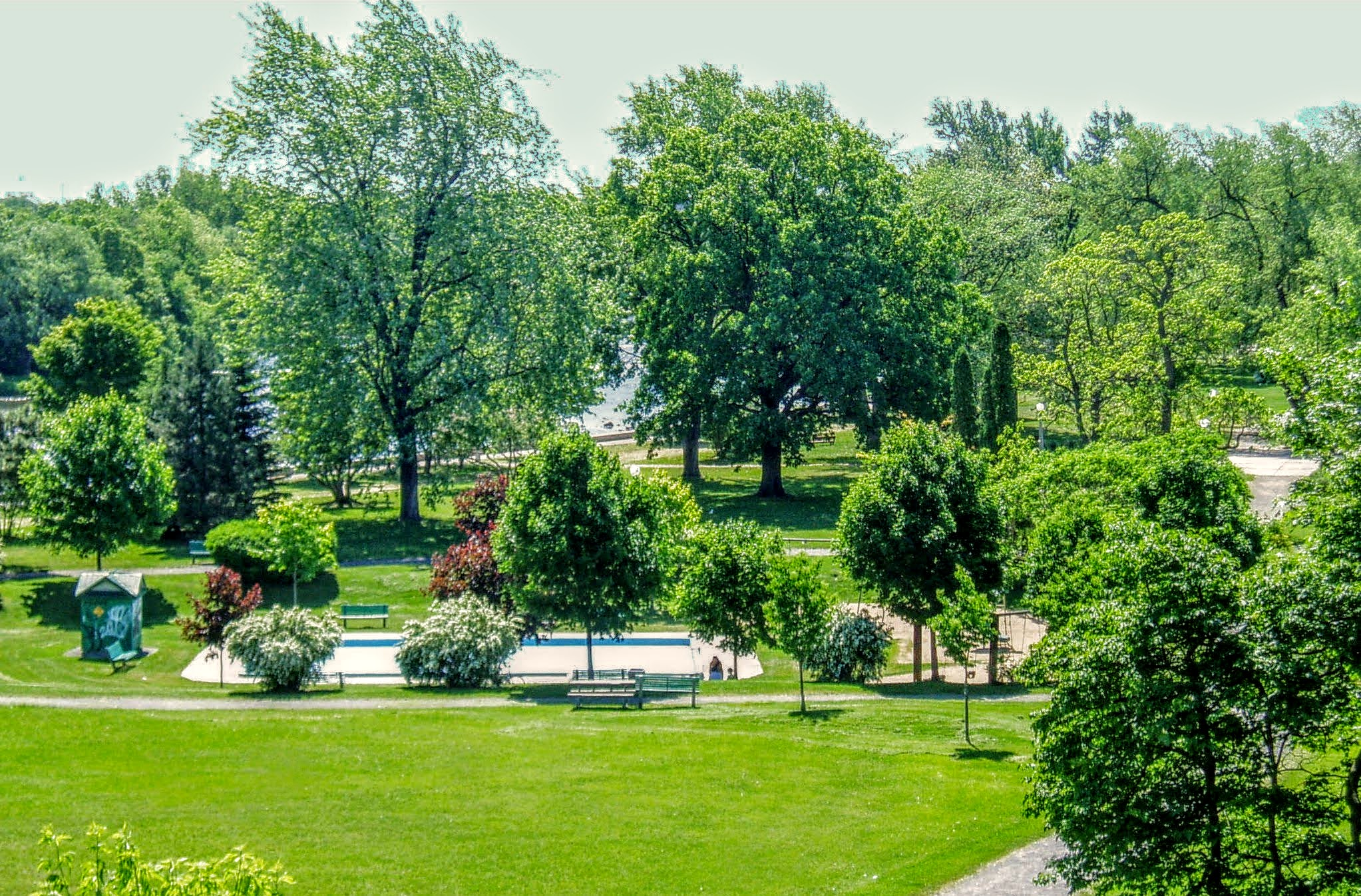
Strathcona Park, Ottawa

Strathcona Park, which was erected by the city of Ottawa in 1907, is dedicated to him. It is located on an area which was a training ground for Canadian troops before shipping out for the Boer War.

==== Montreal ====
Lord Strathcona is commemorated in Montreal by several McGill University buildings; he gave freely of his time to this institution, and a great quantity of his wealth. In Westmount, a street was named in his honour. In the greater Montreal West Island community, the Strathcona Desjardins Credit Union bears his name, with offices in downtown Montreal and in Kirkland. The credit union members were historically from the English-speaking hospitals of Montreal, but since then recent mergers also include Montreal area, English-speaking teachers.

The Strathcona family mansion in Montreal on Dorchester Street (now René Lévesque Boulevard) near Fort Street was torn down in 1941 to make way for an apartment building.

Strathcona Avenue, located in Westmount (a suburb on the island of Montreal) is named in his honour.

==== Manitoba ====
Strathcona is commemorated in Manitoba by the Rural Municipality of Strathcona and by three streets in Winnipeg: Donald Street and Smith Street in the downtown core, and Strathcona Street in the city's West End.

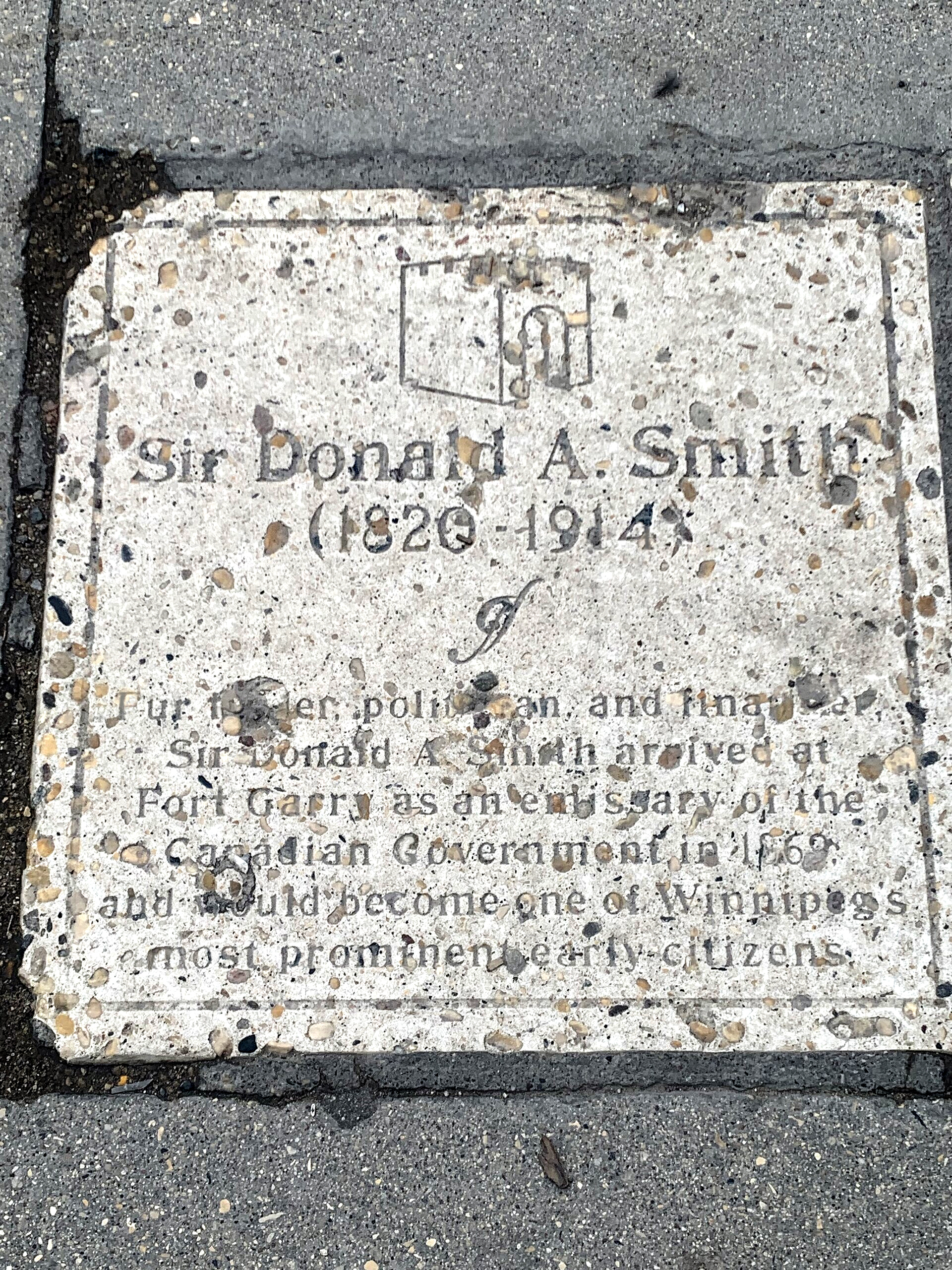
Memorial stone to Donald Smith, set into the sidewalk on the south side of Portage Avenue, Winnipeg, between Donald Street and Smith Street

There is a pair of memorial stones to Strathcona, set into the sidewalks on the north and south sides of Portage Avenue, between Donald Street and Smith Street. The inscription on the stones is identical:

Sir Donald A. Smith
(1820–1914)

Fur trader, politician, and financier, Sir Donald A. Smith arrived at Fort Garry as an emissary of the Canadian government in 1869 and would become one of Winnipeg's most prominent early citizens.

The Town of Transcona, Manitoba, incorporated in 1912 as a community to support the new railway shops of the Grand Trunk Pacific and National Transcontinental railways, takes half its name from Lord Strathcona, and the other half from the word transcontinental.

==== Alberta ====
In Alberta he is commemorated by the Calgary neighbourhood of Strathcona Park by the Edmonton neighbourhood of Strathcona, and by the municipality of Strathcona County.

==== British Columbia ====
In British Columbia, the Vancouver neighbourhood of Strathcona takes its name from Lord Strathcona School built in 1891.

Mount Sir Donald in Glacier National Park is named after him.

BC's oldest provincial park, Strathcona Park, on Vancouver Island was named after him when it was founded in 1911.

==== Northwest Territories ====
The Town of Fort Smith in the Northwest Territories is named after Donald Smith.

==== United Kingdom ====
There is a stained glass window memorializing him in Westminster Abbey. His coat of arms appears over the main entrance of Marischal College in Aberdeen.

=== Art and sport ===
There are oil portraits of Lord Strathcona by many artists, but the Swiss-born American artist Adolfo Müller-Ury seems to have made a number of head and shoulder portraits of him from 1898 (examples may be found at the Burlington Northern Santa Fe Railroad offices and in the Hudson's Bay Company [this has a repainted background]), and the artist also presented his 1899 bust-length charcoal and crayon drawing of Strathcona to McGill University in Montreal in 1916.

Strathcona was inducted into the Canadian Curling Hall of Fame in 1973.

=== Ships named for Lord Strathcona ===
At least three ships were named for Lord Strathcona during his lifetime. These were:

- Strathcona, a 598-ton, 142-foot wooden sidewheel paddle steamer, was built in 1898 by J. Macfarlane at New Westminster, British Columbia for the Hudson's Bay Company. The vessel was operated on the Pacific Northwest coast and in 1898-99 carried elements of the Yukon Field Force. In 1902 Strathcona was sold to S.J.V. Spratt, later passing into the hands of the Sidney & Nanaimo Transportation Company. On 17 November 1909, the vessel was wrecked on a snag near Pages Landing on the Fraser River. In 1910 Strathcona was refloated and towed to New Westminster, where the engines and boilers were removed and the hull abandoned.
- Strathcona, a 1,881-ton, 253-foot steel canal-sized Great Lakes freighter, was built in 1900 by the Caledon Shipbuilding Company in Dundee, Scotland. This steamer was converted from a bulk carrier to a package freighter in 1911 by the Collingwood Shipbuilding Company at Collingwood, Ontario. Strathcona sailed for Inland Lines, Ltd., of Hamilton, Ontario until 1913, whereupon it passed into the hands of Canada Steamship Lines when that fleet was established. In 1915 Strathcona was requisitioned for ocean service during the First World War. While bound from the Tyne to Marseilles, France, Strathcona was sunk by a scuttling charge from SM U-78 on 13 April 1917 when some 145 miles west-northwest of North Ronaldsay, Orkney Islands.
- Lord Strathcona, a 495-ton, 160-foot steel salvage tug, was built in 1902 by J.P. Renoldson & Sons, Ltd., at South Shields, England. Owned by George T. Davie & Sons of Lauzon, Quebec, this tug arrived on its delivery voyage on 4 May 1902. Lord Strathcona was sold in 1912 to the Quebec Salvage & Wrecking Company, Ltd., a Canadian Pacific subsidiary, and remained in service through the end of the Second World War. Ownership passed to Foundation Maritime in 1944, and Lord Strathcona was scrapped in 1947.

A fourth ship, Lord Strathcona, was a 7,335-ton, 455-foot ocean steamer built in 1915 by W. Doxford & Sons Ltd. at Sunderland, England. Owned by the Dominion Line, Lord Strathcona was bound from Wabana, Newfoundland to Sydney, Nova Scotia with iron ore when the vessel was torpedoed and sunk by U-513 on 5 September 1942. Lord Strathcona's crew of 44, including Captain Charles Stewart, were rescued.

== Gallery ==
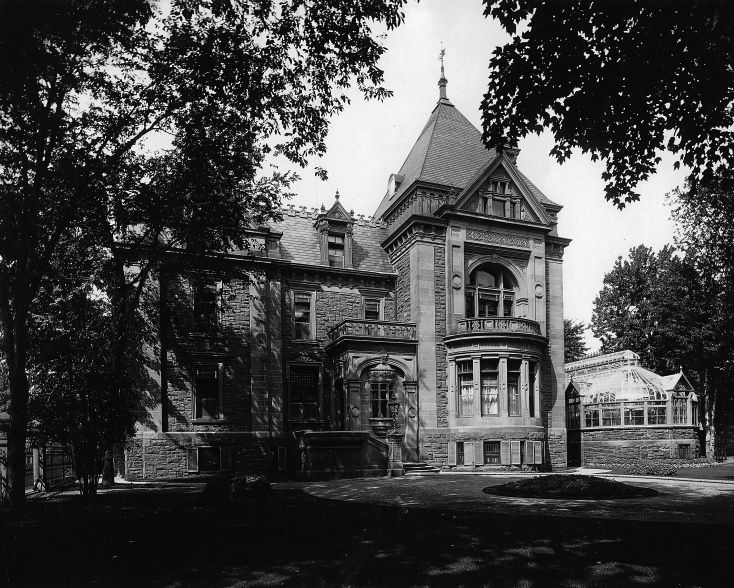
Lord Strathcona's house in Montreal's Golden Square Mile, built in 1879

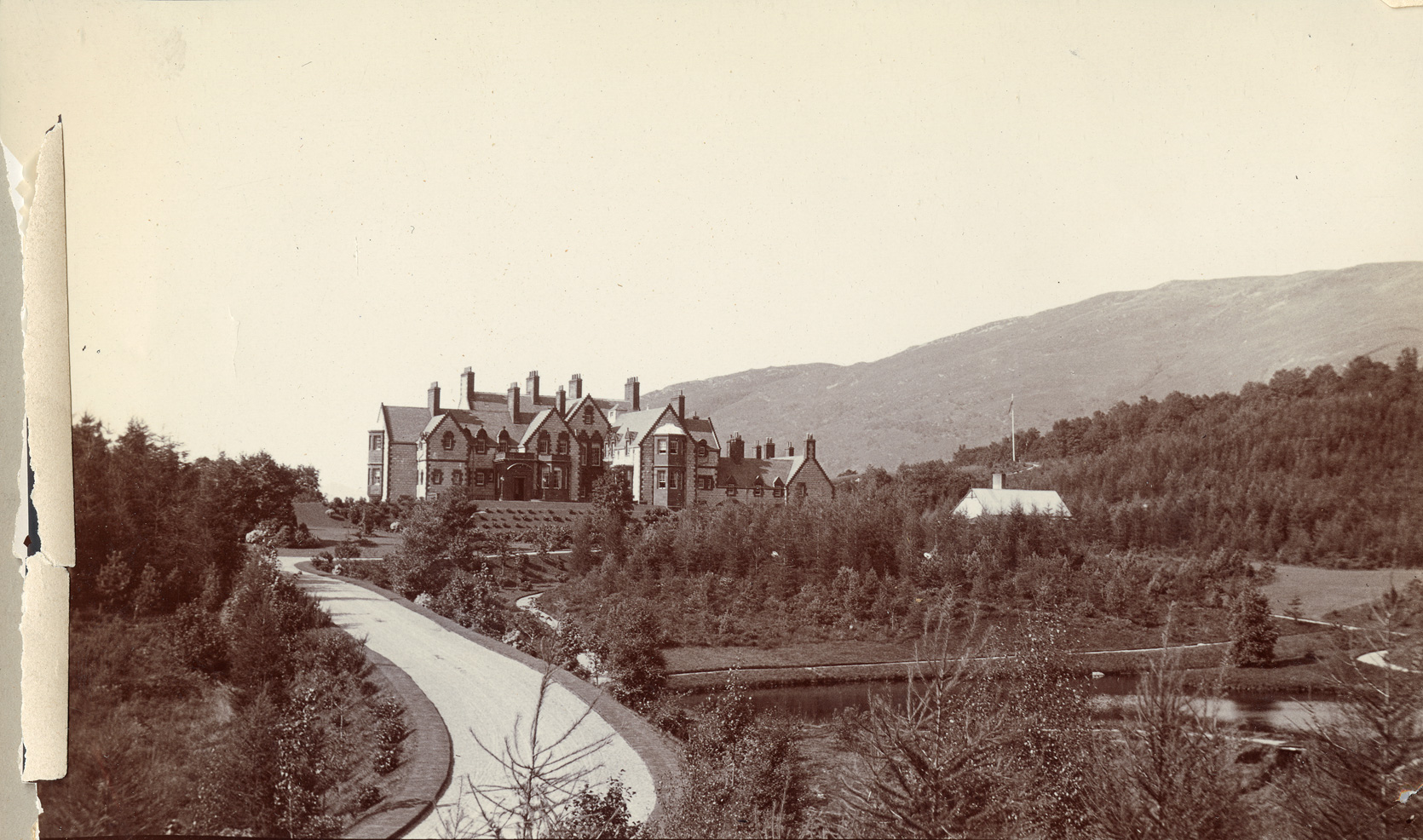
Glencoe House, Scotland in 1905, built by Lord Strathcona in 1895

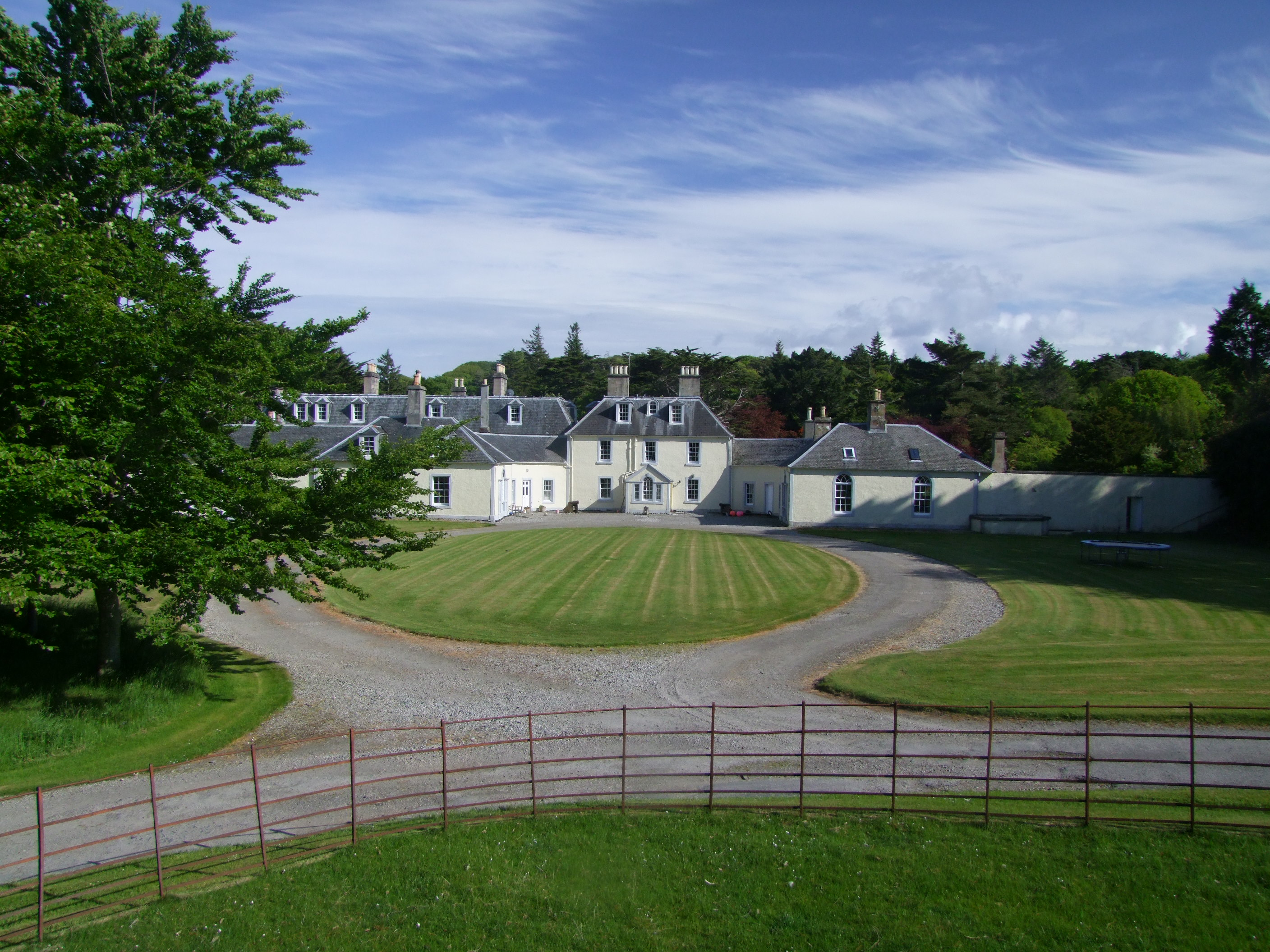
Colonsay House, purchased with the island by Lord Strathcona and still occupied by his descendants today

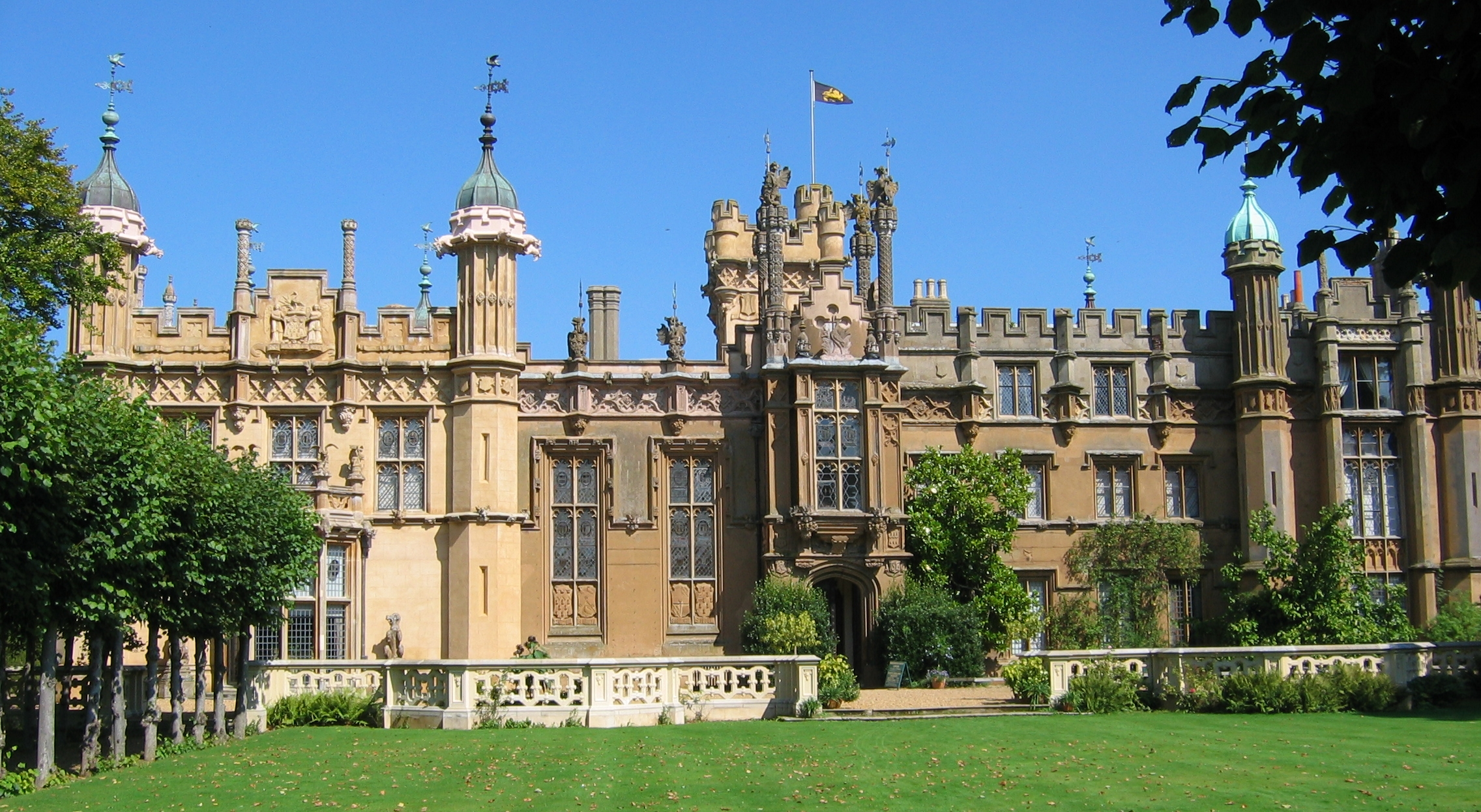
Knebworth House, leased by Lord Strathcona from 1899 until his death

== See also ==
- Canadian peers and baronets
- Glencoe House
- Glencoe Lochan
- Golden Square Mile

== Notes ==
Parliament of Canada
Preceded by None	Member of Parliament from Selkirk; 1871–1880	Succeeded by Thomas Scott
Preceded by Matthew Hamilton Gault	Member of Parliament from Montreal West; 1887–1896	Electoral district abolished
Business positions
Preceded by C. F. Smithers	President of the Bank of Montreal; 1887–1905	Succeeded by George Alexander Drummond
Preceded by Eden Colvile	Governor of the Hudson's Bay Company; 1889–1914	Succeeded by Sir Thomas Skinner, 1st Baronet
Diplomatic posts
Preceded by Charles Tupper	Canadian High Commissioner to the United Kingdom; 1896–1914	Succeeded by George Halsey Perley
Academic offices
Preceded by James Ferrier	Chancellor of McGill University; 1889–1914	Succeeded by William Christopher Macdonald
Preceded by The Marquess of Huntly	Rector of the University of Aberdeen; 1899–1902	Succeeded by Charles Thomson Ritchie
Preceded by The Duke of Richmond and Gordon	Chancellor of the University of Aberdeen; 1903–1914	Succeeded by The Earl of Elgin and Kincardine
Peerage of the United Kingdom
New creation	Baron Strathcona and Mount Royal; 1897–1914	Extinct
New creation	Baron Strathcona and Mount Royal; 1900–1914	Succeeded by Margaret Howard
