= James McDougall (explorer) =

Explorer of nineteenth century Canada

James McDougall was a nineteenth-century fur trader and explorer, who is remembered for his participation in opening up present-day British Columbia, Canada to European settlement as part of a North West Company expedition to the region, led by Simon Fraser.

== Fraser expedition ==
McDougall was third-in-command on Fraser's team, functioning as junior clerk to John Stuart. Fraser and his crew entered the territory they would call New Caledonia in 1805, a foray that would culminate in the successful descent and ascent of the Fraser River in the spring and summer of 1808. During that time, Fraser and his men constructed several fur-trading posts.

The first of these resulted from a trip undertaken by Fraser and McDougall up the Parsnip River in the autumn of 1805, in order to determine an ideal route for reaching the Fraser from the Peace River canyon, which was a major portal at the time into the territory west of the Rocky Mountains. Their travels resulted in the establishment by Fraser of the first post and permanent European settlement west of the Rockies, at present-day McLeod Lake.

That winter Connor Swingle, the crew member left in charge of the deserted nascent post, and McDougall were charged with administration of the post while Fraser and Stuart were engaged elsewhere. During that time, McDougall seized the initiative to investigate reports he had received of an important lake and fur region to the northwest, in the heart of the region inhabited by the Dakelh First Nation. He journeyed down the as-yet unnamed Fraser River, becoming the first European to find and ascend the Nechako River, a major tributary that Sir Alexander Mackenzie, travelling that way twelve years earlier, had inexplicably missed. From there, McDougall ascended the Stuart River to its source at Stuart Lake. McDougall would later go on to explore what has come to be known as British Columbia's "Lake Country", ascending the Nechako beyond Fraser Lake as far as Babine Lake and Francois Lake. The fruit of McDougall's explorations would be the construction by Fraser of a post at Stuart Lake, Fort St. James, which would become headquarters of the New Caledonia department of the North West Company (merged in 1821 with the Hudson's Bay Company).

== Later life ==
Following Fraser's expedition, McDougall stayed in New Caledonia to assist Stuart as a trader at the Fort St. James' post for a period of some years.
