= Vanderhoof Airport =

Airport in British Columbia, Canada

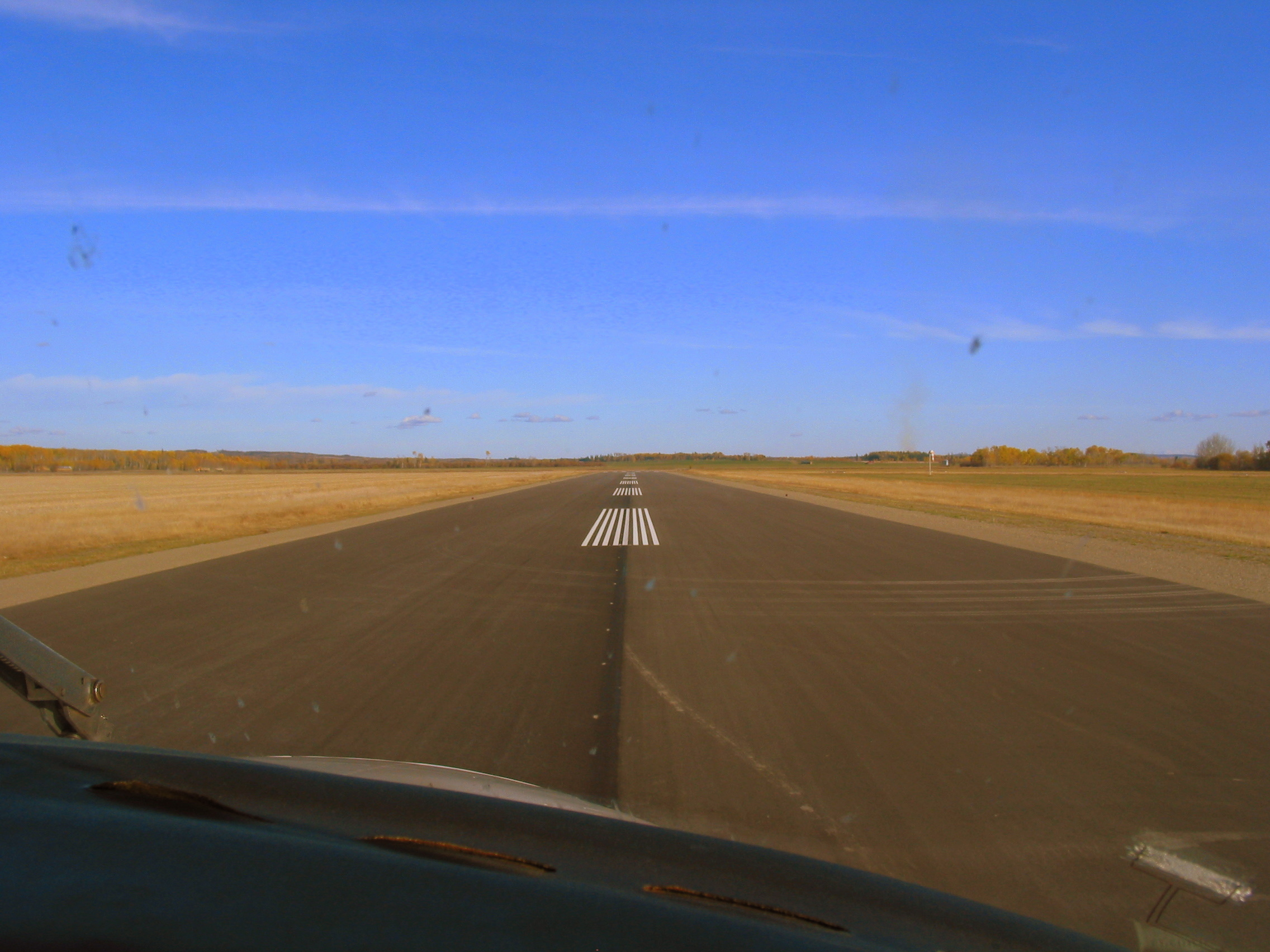
- IATA: none; ICAO: none; TC LID: CAU4

Summary
- Airport type: Public
- Operator: District of Vanderhoof
- Location: Vanderhoof, British Columbia
- Time zone: PST (UTC−08:00)
  - Summer (DST): PDT (UTC−07:00)
- Elevation AMSL: 2,229 ft / 679 m
- Coordinates: 54°02′48″N 124°00′40″W
- Website: Official website

Map
- Location in British Columbia

Runways
| Direction | Length | | Surface |
| Direction | ft | m | Surface |
|---|---|---|---|
| 03/21 | 4,496 | 1,370 | turf/gravel |
| 07/25 | 5,019 | 1,530 | asphalt |
| 15/33 | 3,331 | 1,015 | turf/gravel |
- Source

Vanderhoof Airport (TC LID: CAU4) is about 1.9 nautical miles (3.5 km; 2.2 mi) north of the centre of Vanderhoof, British Columbia, Canada.

== Earlier landings ==
In November 1928, John M. Patterson landed a Yukon Airways and Exploration Co Alexander Eaglerock A-2 biplane in a nearby pasture. In July 1929, USAAC Capt. Russ G. Hoyt made a refuelling stop and overnight stay with his Curtiss Hawk XP-6B. In June 1931, Bill McClusky landed his stripped down Junkers F 13 in a pasture, where removed parts were reattached before flying south. In July 1934, a Two Brothers Mining Co seaplane used Nulki Lake to the southwest.

In March 1938, the first airfield opened on the Cocker and Emslie farm (formerly the Borhaven farm). However, this emergency field was rarely used. In November 1941, a Pan Am Lockheed en route from Seattle to Alaska landed for unknown reasons.

== World War II era ==
Following the attack on Pearl Harbor, an intermediate airfield between Smithers and Prince George was needed as a second line of defence against a Japanese invasion. In 1942, a parcel of land, which included the Cocker and Emslie farm, was expropriated and three gravel runways built. The RCAF erected barracks, a recreation hall, a mess hall, a garage and an office. Four identical residences housed DOT personnel to monitor and report weather. In May 1943, the airport was designated the No. 14 Staging Unit. Being on call for emergency military landings (though none occurred) required the use of big rollers to compact snow at all hours during winter. The RCAF personnel dwindled from about 20 to a lone caretaker by 1945.

== Post-war expansion ==
After the war, administration of the airport passed from the DND to the DOT. Meanwhile, a floatplane dock had been constructed on the Nechako River. Assumedly, this was the same location as the 1980s one.

Charter flights brought fishing and hunting parties. In September 1948, a converted B-25 was likely then the largest plane to land at the airport. In August 1950, a Lockheed Lodestar was one of the arrivals.

In 1951, Central British Columbia Airways (later part of Pacific Coastal Airlines) established a Prince George–Terrace scheduled service, with a Vanderhoof flag stop.

In April 1959, the village of Vanderhoof assumed control and maintenance of the airport. Only the four residences, the range station office, the power plant, and the pumphouse, remained standing.

In July 1964, a Pacific Western Airlines DC-3 was one of the largest planes to then visit the airport. That September, the Vanderhoof Flying Club was formed at the airport.

In the mid-1960s, the entire Alberta cabinet chartered a 45-seater plane. On arrival, the flight attendant opened the door 5 to 6 metres (15 to 20 ft) above the ground and requested passenger boarding stairs. With none available, the passengers disembarked using a rope ladder. Two decades later, the airport still had no such stairs.

A 1970 provincial study suggested that the airport be developed as a backup for Prince George during extreme fog, instead of diverting planes to more distant airports. During 1972–1975, Harrison Airways provided tri-weekly scheduled services but these were the only regular ones to ever operate.

Although held intermittently since the mid-1960s, the annual airshow became better known in the mid-1970s and a two-day event in 1978. That year, a gravel base was added to the 1,209 by 22 metres (3,968 by 72 ft) main runway, before paving the next year. The total project cost about $400,000. The official opening in July 1979 coincided with the annual air show. The other two sides of the triangular takeoff and landing configuration remained grass strips.

By 1980, the five businesses at the airport included flight training and plane rentals. In 1985, the runway was extended over 300 metres (980 ft) to a length of over 1,500 metres (4,900 ft).

Ongoing losses, climbing with the 1994 event, ended the annual airshow.

== Later developments ==
Around 2002, bulk aviation fuel facilities were installed at the airport. In 2009, the airport received nearly $1.6 million in grants to install a new lighting and navigation system.

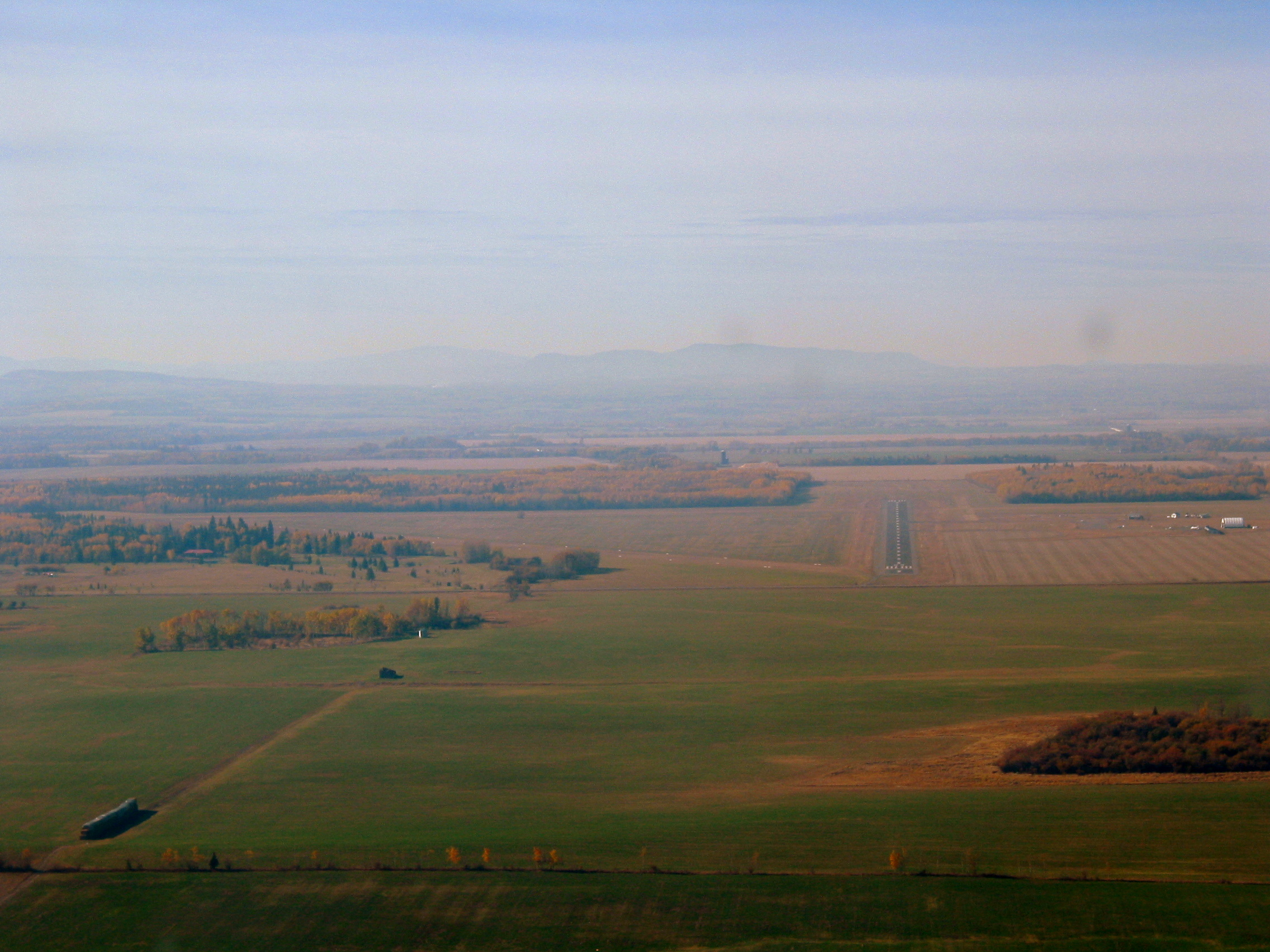
Westward approach to Vanderhoof Airport, 2006.

In 2011, two flight simulators were obtained by the Nechako campus of the College of New Caledonia (CNC) at Vanderhoof Airport. In 2012, a scaled down annual airshow was reintroduced, which apart from cancellation during the COVID-19 pandemic has continued.

In 2019, the BC Aviation Council awarded Airport of the Year to Vanderhoof. An apron expansion and lowered approaches assisted medevacs. That year, the municipality decommissioned the downtown water aerodrome, which was on municipal property. The Vanderhoof Airport Development Society, the controller, re-established the operation on private property, where the district faced neither ongoing cost nor liability. Still on the Nechako River and designated CVH3, the facility lacks on-site fuel.

In 2020, the Vanderhoof Flying Club applied grants of $110,000 to purchase the self-serve aviation fuel infrastructure at the airport. In 2021, the BC Fire Protection Department acquired one of the bigger hangars as the regional firebase. That year, the airport received a $490,083 grant for apron and taxiways rehabilitation.

The Vanderhoof Flying Club manages the aircraft fuel facility. The terminal building is classified more as a clubhouse, which caters to charter flights, corporate flights, medevacs, and recreational flying. An Automatic Weather Observing System (AWOS) provides current conditions.

== Accidents and incidents ==
- February 1980: A Cessna 172, which flipped on landing short of the runway, sustained heavy damage.
- February 1983: A small plane flipped on landing near the airport.
- July 1985: When the tail rotor separated on a Hughes 500-C helicopter, while performing at the airshow, the machine plunged about 75 metres (246 ft) to the ground.
- September 1985: A single-engine Aeronca developed engine trouble and crashed into bushes during an attempted landing.
- July 1988: A homebuilt BD5-J flamed out after takeoff. Following a steep descent, the jet crashed through trees and utility lines before slamming into a field next to the airport, killing the pilot.
- April 1994: Stalling on takeoff, a small plane ran off the end of the runway during an attempted landing. On entering a snowbank, it flipped nose down.
- Jan 2002: A fire destroyed the Vanderhoof Flying Service 930-square-metre (10,000 ft^{2}) hangar and the four aircraft inside.
- October 2016: A de Havilland DHC-2 Beaver plane, which departed the Vanderhoof airport, crashed about 25 minutes after takeoff. The pilot died, but four passengers were rescued.
- June 2017: A wind storm damaged an old hanger, causing significant damage to the three planes inside.
