= Chinlac =

Former village in British Columbia, Canada

Coordinates: 53.9997°N 123.5636°W

Chinlac is the site of a former Dakelh (Carrier) village in northeastern British Columbia, Canada. The site is on the west bank of the Stuart River, about 1 kilometre (0.62 mi) upstream from its junction with the Nechako River. Oral tradition considers it to have been one of the major Carrier settlements. The site is located at a shallow point in the river where a fishing weir could be used to harvest running salmon. Remains of the weir can still be seen from the meadow.

Chinlac is an anglicization of the Carrier word Chunlak, itself a contraction of duchun nidulak - "logs customarily float to a point", which describes the way in which driftwood accumulates in the shallows where the weir was built.

According to oral tradition, the village was destroyed around 1745 by Chilcotin raiders from Nazko, on the Nazko River. (Although Nazko is now a Carrier village, it was Chilcotin at the time.) The meadow contains the traces of 13 lodges. In the surrounding bush are the remains of hundreds of cache pits.

One lodge site was excavated in 1951–1952 by a team led by Charles Edward Borden. Among other things, he found a Chinese coin of Song Dynasty design, indicating trade with the Pacific Coast at an unknown time prior to direct Carrier contact with Europeans or Asians.
