= Leanchoil Hospital =

- NHS Grampian
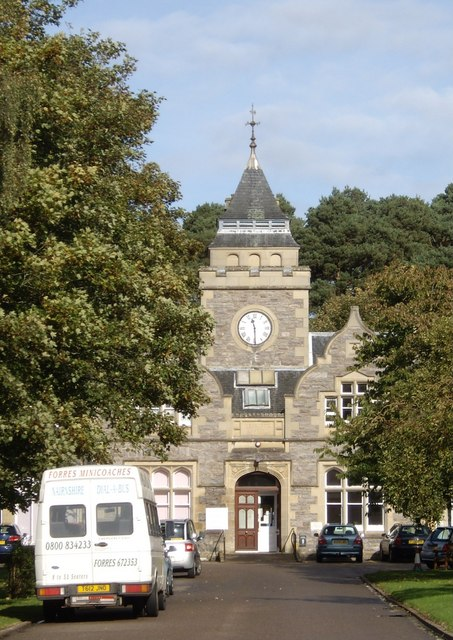
- Entrance to the Leanchoil Hospital

- Shown in Moray

Geography
- Location: Forres, Moray, Scotland, United Kingdom
- Coordinates: 57°36′15″N 3°35′26″W

Organisation
- Care system: NHS Scotland
- Type: community hospital

Services
- Beds: 1

History
- Founded: 1892
- Closed: 2018

Links
- Lists: Hospitals in Scotland

Leanchoil Hospital was a community hospital in Forres, Moray, Scotland. It was managed by NHS Grampian.

== History ==
The hospital was financed by Lord Strathcona to serve the population of his native Forres and the surrounding area. It was designed by John Rhind and was named after the farm on which Strathcona had grown up with his mother. It was opened to patients in April 1892. On his death in 1914, Strathcona left a further bequest of £10,000 to the hospital. A maternity wing was added in 1940 and it joined the National Health Service in 1948.

The hospital closed temporarily in January 2011 following an electrical fault but reopened in December 2011 once extensive renovations had been completed. There were only 9 inpatient beds available after it reopened.

NHS Grampian announced in November 2018 that, as they had no means to invest, the hospital, which had already been temporarily closed two months earlier, would close permanently.

== Services ==
The hospital had 9 beds providing medical care, rehabilitation, assessment, palliative/terminal care, convalescence and respite care. The beds were in 4-bedded rooms which are divided into male and female wards, and there was one single palliative care suite.
