= Fort St. James =

- District municipality
- District of Fort St. James
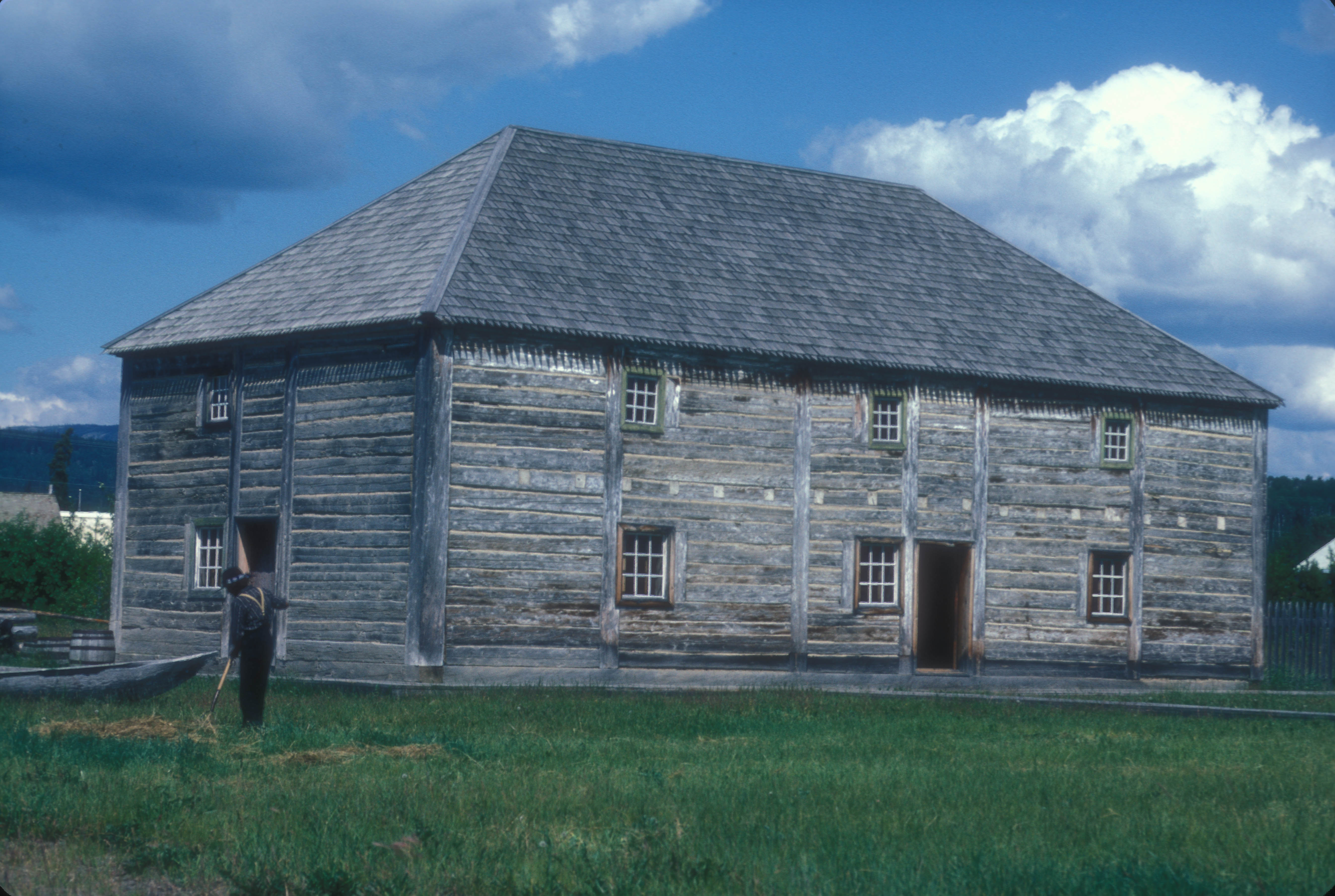

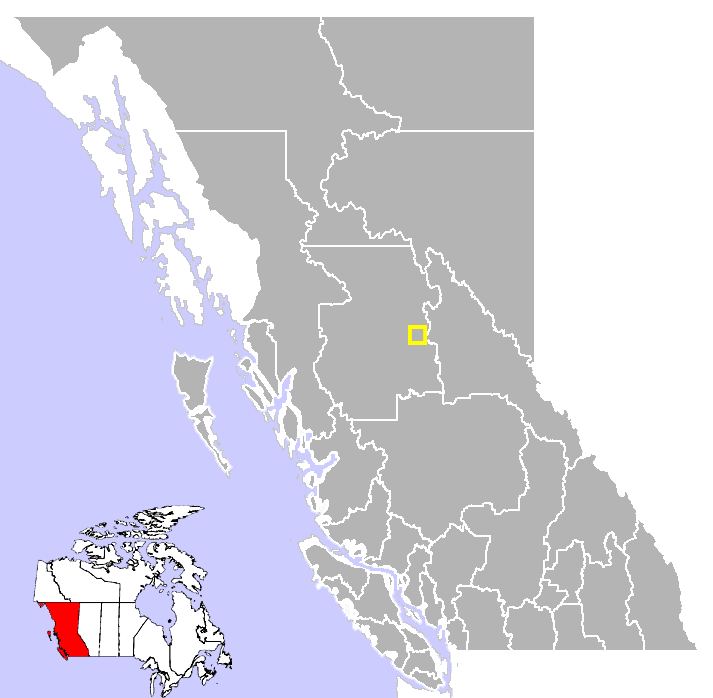
- Location of Fort St. James in British Columbia

- Location within British Columbia Location within Canada
- Coordinates: 54°26′35″N 124°15′15″W
- Country: Canada
- Province: British Columbia
- Region: Omineca Country
- Regional district: Regional District of Bulkley Nechako
- Founded: 1806
- Incorporated: 1952

Government
  - Governing body: Municipal Council
  - Mayor: Vacant

Area
  - Total: 23.47 km^{2} (9.06 sq mi)
- Elevation: 700 m (2,300 ft)

Population (2016)
  - Total: 1,598
  - Density: 72/km^{2} (190/sq mi)
- Time zone: UTC−07:00 (PT)
- Postal code span: V0J 1P0
- Area codes: +250, +778
- Highways: 27
- Waterways: Stuart Lake, Stuart River, Necoslie River, Nahounli Creek
- Website: www.fortstjames.ca

National Historic Site of Canada
- Official name: Fort St. James National Historic Site of Canada
- Designated: 1948

Fort St. James is a district municipality and former fur trading post in northern central British Columbia, Canada. It is located on the south-eastern shore of Stuart Lake in the Omineca Country, at the northern terminus of Highway 27, which connects to Highway 16 at Vanderhoof.

It is home to the John Prince Research Forest which features abundant wildlife. This community celebrated its bicentennial in 2016 and is incorporated as a district municipality.

== Fort St. James National Historic Site ==
Founded by the North West Company explorer and fur trader Simon Fraser in 1806, it came under the management of the Hudson's Bay Company in 1821 with the forced merger of the two battling fur companies. Also known historically as Stuart Lake Post, it is one of British Columbia's oldest permanent European settlements and was the administrative centre for the Hudson's Bay Company's New Caledonia fur district. The fort, rebuilt four times, continued as an important trading post well into the twentieth century. Now the fort is a National Historic Site of Canada with some buildings dating to the 1880s.

== History ==
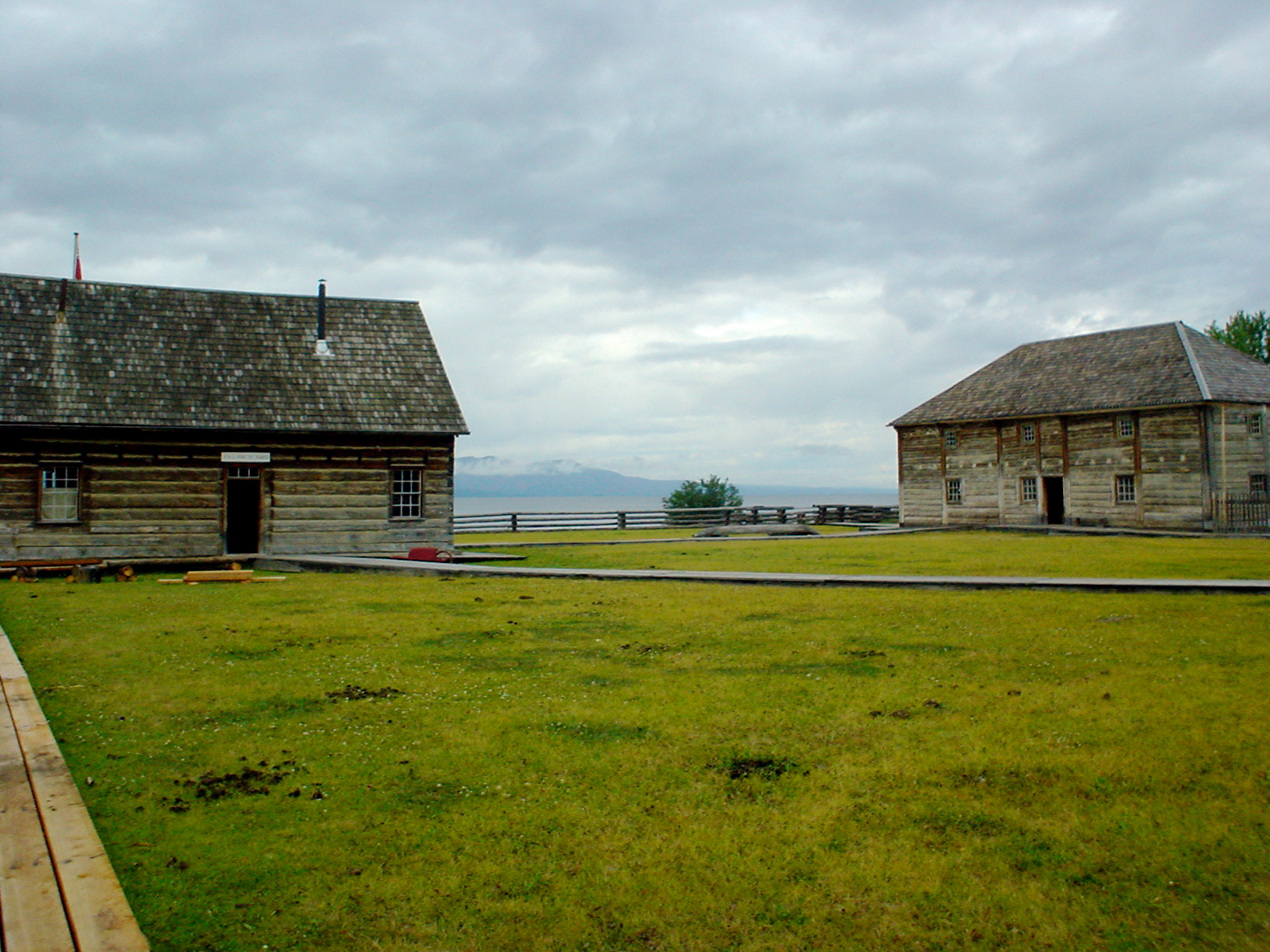
Fort St. James National Historic Site

As part of his commission from the North West Company, Fraser and his assistants John Stuart and James McDougall explored potential river routes to the Pacific Ocean from 1805 through 1808. Explorations in the Winter of 1805-06 by McDougall resulted in the discovery of Carrier's Lake, now known as Stuart Lake. In the heart of territory inhabited by the Carrier or Dakelh First Nation, this proved to be a lucrative locale for fur trading and so a post – Fort St. James – was built on its shore in 1806. In 1821, the fort came under the control of the Hudson's Bay Company, when the North West Company merged with it. It subsequently became the administrative headquarters of the company's vast New Caledonia District.

The fur trade was slow to take root in the area, since the economy of the Dakelh people had been based on the fishery, rather than on trapping. In addition, there were customary and ceremonial restrictions which placed obstacles in the way of an efficient fur economy. Nonetheless, eventually the post became profitable, and continued to function until its closure in 1952.

The community is located on the south-eastern shore of Stuart Lake, at the head of the Stuart River. Both the lake and the river are named for Fraser's assistant John Stuart, who would later become head of the New Caledonia District of the North West Company.

== Climate ==
Fort St. James is located in the sub-boreal spruce zone of British Columbia, a sub-division of the hemiboreal climate zone. It is characterised by severe, snowy winters and short, warm summers. The region is rich in wildlife. Under the Köppen climate classification Fort St. James is classified as a humid continental climate (Dfb).

Climate data for Fort St. James, 1981–2010 normals, extremes 1895–present
| Month | Jan | Feb | Mar | Apr | May | Jun | Jul | Aug | Sep | Oct | Nov | Dec | Year |
|---|---|---|---|---|---|---|---|---|---|---|---|---|---|
| Record high °C (°F) | 12.0 (53.6) | 13.0 (55.4) | 17.1 (62.8) | 24.4 (75.9) | 35.0 (95.0) | 33.9 (93.0) | 36.7 (98.1) | 35.6 (96.1) | 29.5 (85.1) | 26.5 (79.7) | 16.1 (61.0) | 11.0 (51.8) | 36.7 (98.1) |
| Mean daily maximum °C (°F) | −5.3 (22.5) | −1.7 (28.9) | 4.0 (39.2) | 9.9 (49.8) | 15.6 (60.1) | 19.6 (67.3) | 21.8 (71.2) | 21.7 (71.1) | 16.4 (61.5) | 9.0 (48.2) | 0.6 (33.1) | −3.8 (25.2) | 9.0 (48.2) |
| Daily mean °C (°F) | −9.5 (14.9) | −6.8 (19.8) | −1.8 (28.8) | 3.9 (39.0) | 9.2 (48.6) | 13.4 (56.1) | 15.4 (59.7) | 14.8 (58.6) | 10.2 (50.4) | 4.3 (39.7) | −3.0 (26.6) | −7.8 (18.0) | 3.5 (38.3) |
| Mean daily minimum °C (°F) | −13.7 (7.3) | −11.8 (10.8) | −7.7 (18.1) | −2.2 (28.0) | 2.8 (37.0) | 7.2 (45.0) | 8.9 (48.0) | 7.9 (46.2) | 3.9 (39.0) | −0.5 (31.1) | −6.5 (20.3) | −11.7 (10.9) | −2.0 (28.4) |
| Record low °C (°F) | −49.4 (−56.9) | −49.4 (−56.9) | −39.4 (−38.9) | −29.4 (−20.9) | −11.7 (10.9) | −6.1 (21.0) | −5.6 (21.9) | −7.8 (18.0) | −13.3 (8.1) | −23.0 (−9.4) | −37.8 (−36.0) | −47.2 (−53.0) | −49.4 (−56.9) |
| Average precipitation mm (inches) | 48.1 (1.89) | 30.0 (1.18) | 25.7 (1.01) | 23.7 (0.93) | 38.9 (1.53) | 50.6 (1.99) | 50.6 (1.99) | 45.0 (1.77) | 39.3 (1.55) | 48.1 (1.89) | 44.5 (1.75) | 42.6 (1.68) | 487.2 (19.18) |
| Average rainfall mm (inches) | 4.9 (0.19) | 3.6 (0.14) | 5.9 (0.23) | 18.0 (0.71) | 38.2 (1.50) | 50.6 (1.99) | 50.6 (1.99) | 45.0 (1.77) | 39.1 (1.54) | 38.7 (1.52) | 15.7 (0.62) | 4.2 (0.17) | 314.5 (12.38) |
| Average snowfall cm (inches) | 43.3 (17.0) | 26.4 (10.4) | 19.8 (7.8) | 5.7 (2.2) | 0.7 (0.3) | 0 (0) | 0 (0) | 0 (0) | 0.2 (0.1) | 9.5 (3.7) | 28.8 (11.3) | 38.4 (15.1) | 172.7 (68.0) |
| Average precipitation days (≥ 0.2 mm) | 12.7 | 8.9 | 8.6 | 8.3 | 12.4 | 12.7 | 13.7 | 11.3 | 12.1 | 14.0 | 13.1 | 11.3 | 139.1 |
| Average rainy days (≥ 0.2 mm) | 2.0 | 1.8 | 3.2 | 6.8 | 12.2 | 12.7 | 13.7 | 11.3 | 12.1 | 12.4 | 5.3 | 1.8 | 95.2 |
| Average snowy days (≥ 0.2 cm) | 11.4 | 7.4 | 6.0 | 2.2 | 0.4 | 0 | 0 | 0 | 0.08 | 2.4 | 9.0 | 10.0 | 48.8 |
| Average relative humidity (%) | 81.6 | 72.6 | 57.0 | 45.0 | 44.1 | 48.0 | 47.3 | 47.7 | 52.7 | 62.9 | 79.8 | 84.2 | 60.2 |
| Mean monthly sunshine hours | 51.3 | 85.5 | 151.3 | 207.6 | 245.7 | 260.2 | 275.3 | 256.8 | 177.7 | 116.0 | 60.2 | 41.0 | 1,928.6 |
| Percentage possible sunshine | 20.8 | 31.3 | 41.3 | 49.3 | 49.5 | 50.6 | 53.4 | 55.6 | 46.4 | 35.4 | 23.5 | 17.9 | 39.6 |
Source: Environment Canada, (Sunshine and humidity data from Fort St. James Airport)

== Demographics ==
In the 2021 Census of Population conducted by Statistics Canada, Fort St. James had a population of 1,386 living in 586 of its 671 total private dwellings, a change of −13.3% from its 2016 population of 1,598. With a land area of 23.45 km^{2} (9.05 sq mi), it had a population density of 59.1/km^{2} (153.1/sq mi) in 2021.

About one quarter of the population of the greater Fort St. James area identify as being of First Nations origin The town is surrounded by numerous, small First Nations communities and Indian reserves, including Pinchie, Tachie, and Nak'azdli.

Throughout the 1980s and 1990s, Fort St. James had the highest proportion of South Asians of any municipality in Canada, forming approximately 22% of the total population as per the 1991 census. The South Asian community of Fort St. James was composed mostly of Punjabis of the Sikh faith. Gursikh Temple, the local gurdwara, was built in 1981. The Sikh population of Fort St. James declined from 435 in 1991 (21.6% of the municipality's 2,015 residents) to 20 in 2021 (1.5% of the municipality's 1,330 residents), as many Sikhs moved to Greater Vancouver. The Gursikh Temple was donated to the Victory Christian Church in 2013.

Panethnic groups in the Municipality of Fort St. James (1981−2021)
| Panethnic group | 2021 | | 2016 | | 2011 | | 2006 | | 2001 | | 1996 | | 1991 | | 1986 | | 1981 | |
| Panethnic group | Pop. | % | Pop. | % | Pop. | % | Pop. | % | Pop. | % | Pop. | % | Pop. | % | Pop. | % | Pop. | % |
|---|---|---|---|---|---|---|---|---|---|---|---|---|---|---|---|---|---|---|
| European (Note: Statistic includes all persons that did not make up part of a visible minority or an indigenous identity.) | 925 | 69.55% | 890 | 56.33% | 1,055 | 64.53% | 990 | 73.06% | 1,195 | 62.08% | 1,320 | 64.55% | 1,225 | 60.79% | 1,185 | 59.85% | 1,390 | 62.19% |
| Indigenous | 300 | 22.56% | 555 | 35.13% | 445 | 27.22% | 160 | 11.81% | 500 | 25.97% | 295 | 14.43% | 265 | 13.15% | 425 | 21.46% | 455 | 20.36% |
| South Asian | 25 | 1.88% | 60 | 3.8% | 75 | 4.59% | 165 | 12.18% | 200 | 10.39% | 405 | 19.8% | 435 | 21.59% | 335 | 16.92% | 345 | 15.44% |
| Other (Note: Statistic includes total responses of "Chinese", "Black", "Filipino", "Latin American", "Southeast Asian", "Arab", "West Asian", "Korean", "Japanese", "Visible minority, n.i.e.", and "Multiple visible minorities" under visible minority section on census.) | 35 | 2.63% | 85 | 5.38% | 50 | 3.06% | 40 | 2.95% | 30 | 1.56% | 25 | 1.22% | 90 | 4.47% | 35 | 1.77% | 45 | 2.01% |
| Total responses | 1,330 | 95.96% | 1,580 | 98.87% | 1,635 | 96.69% | 1,355 | 100% | 1,925 | 99.9% | 2,045 | 99.95% | 2,015 | 97.91% | 1,980 | 99.85% | 2,235 | 97.85% |
| Total population | 1,386 | 100% | 1,598 | 100% | 1,691 | 100% | 1,355 | 100% | 1,927 | 100% | 2,046 | 100% | 2,058 | 100% | 1,983 | 100% | 2,284 | 100% |

- Note: Totals greater than 100% due to multiple origin responses.

Religious groups in Fort St. James (1991−2021)
| Religious group | 2021 | | 2011 | | 2001 | | 1991 | |
| Religious group | Pop. | % | Pop. | % | Pop. | % | Pop. | % |
|---|---|---|---|---|---|---|---|---|
| Christian | 395 | 29.7% | 775 | 47.55% | 970 | 50.39% | 1,065 | 52.85% |
| Sikh | 20 | 1.5% | 50 | 3.07% | 200 | 10.39% | 435 | 21.59% |
| Muslim | 20 | 1.5% | 0 | 0% | 0 | 0% | 0 | 0% |
| Buddhist | 10 | 0.75% | 0 | 0% | 10 | 0.52% | 0 | 0% |
| Hindu | 0 | 0% | 0 | 0% | 0 | 0% | 0 | 0% |
| Jewish | 0 | 0% | 0 | 0% | 0 | 0% | 0 | 0% |
| Other religion | 20 | 1.5% | 55 | 3.37% | 0 | 0% | 0 | 0% |
| Irreligious | 855 | 64.29% | 755 | 46.32% | 760 | 39.48% | 510 | 25.31% |
| Total responses | 1,330 | 95.96% | 1,630 | 96.39% | 1,925 | 99.9% | 2,015 | 97.91% |

== Notable people ==
- Jim Playfair, Associate Coach of the Edmonton Oilers, NHL
- Larry Playfair, Former NHL player with the Buffalo Sabres and the Los Angeles Kings
- Dylan Playfair, Actor, most notable role is "Reilly" on TV show Letterkenny.
- Brian Spencer "Spinner", former player in the National Hockey League and the subject of the film, 'Gross Misconduct'.
- Chief Kwah (aka Chief Kw'eh), (ca. 1755–1840), leading Dakelh chief of the Stuart Lake area.
- Cody Legebokoff, Convicted serial killer
- Johan Pitka, Estonian military commander

== See also ==
- List of National Historic Sites of Canada in British Columbia
