= Glencoe Lochan =

Woodland and lake in Scotland

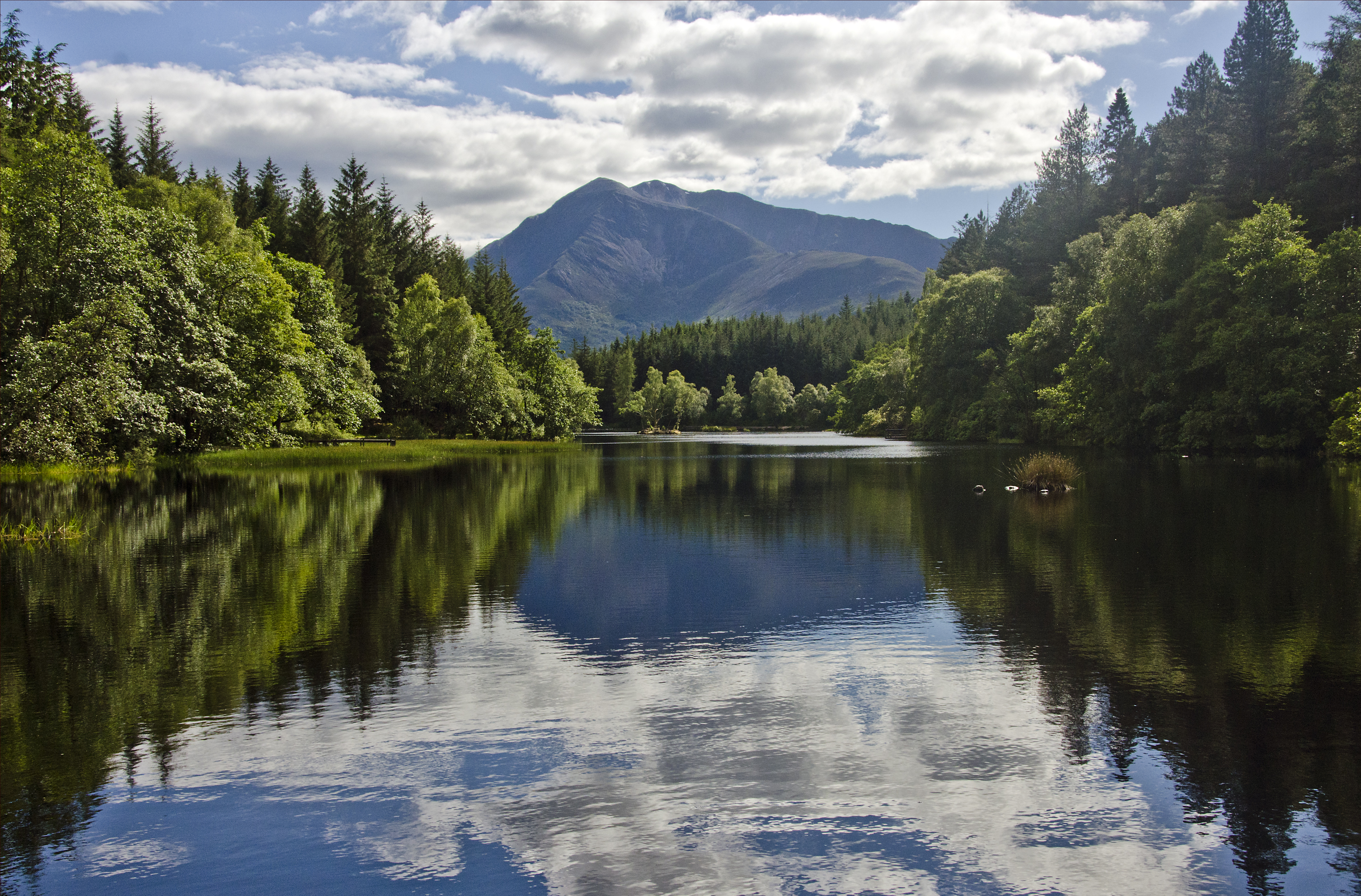

- Location within Highland
- Location: Glencoe, Lochaber, Highland
- Coordinates: 56.689°N 5.096°W

Glencoe Lochan is a tract of forest, surrounding a small lake or lochan, located just north of Glencoe village in the Scottish Highlands. It was planted in the 1890s by Donald Alexander Smith, 1st Baron Strathcona and Mount Royal, with trees transplanted from the Pacific Northwest of Canada.

After acquiring the Glencoe Estate in 1895, Smith and his wife, Isabella Sophia Hardisty, moved from Canada to Scotland. Soon after their arrival, Isabella became increasingly homesick for her ancestral lands in Canada. In an attempt to abate his wife's depression, Smith had this forest painstakingly planted, and granted it to her as a private refuge.

The lochan is currently under the care of the Forestry Commission. There are trails around it and fishing for brown trout is possible with a permit purchased locally.
