= Stuart River (Canada) =

Stuart

Location
- Country: Canada
- Province: British Columbia
- District: Cariboo Land District

Physical characteristics
- Source: Stuart Lake
  - coordinates: 54°26′21″N 124°16′7″W
  - elevation: 673 m (2,208 ft)
- Mouth: Nechako River
  - coordinates: 53°59′17″N 123°32′28″W
  - elevation: 613 m (2,011 ft)
- Length: 187 km (116 mi)
- Discharge
  - location: near Fort St. James
  - average: 131 m^{3}/s (4,600 cu ft/s)
  - minimum: 20.4 m^{3}/s (720 cu ft/s)
  - maximum: 592 m^{3}/s (20,900 cu ft/s)

The Stuart River or Nak'alkoh (Dakelh name) is one of the largest tributaries of the Nechako River in northeastern British Columbia, Canada. The Nechako is in turn one the more important tributaries of the Fraser River. The Stuart River flows 187 kilometres (116 mi) from Stuart Lake to its junction with the Nechako River. The river drains a portion of the Nechako Plateau—a gently rolling region characterized by small lakes and tributaries. Low but impressive ridges interact with the river, creating high bluffs and hoodoos.

The Stuart River's watershed is the northernmost part of the Fraser River's drainage basin. Although the Stuart River itself begins at the south end of Stuart Lake there are many additional rivers and lakes in the watershed. Far to the north the Sakeniche River and Driftwood River flow into Takla Lake, which empties into the Middle River, which in turn flows to Trembleur Lake. The Tachie River flows south from Trembleur Lake to Stuart Lake. a journey of at least 290 kilometres (180 mi).

The river has been named as one of twenty British Columbia heritage rivers.

== Course ==
The Stuart River begins at the south end of Stuart Lake near Fort St. James and the Necoslie Indian Reserve. The Necoslie River joins the river just as it exits Stuart Lake. The Stuart River flows generally south and east for 187 kilometres (116 mi), collecting numerous small tributary streams. It turns to flow more directly south near its confluence with the Nechako River.

== History ==
The Stuart River is part of the historical Dakelh (Carrier) territory. The entire area lies within the historical territory of the Nak'azdli First Nation of Fort St. James and the Saik'uz First Nation of Stoney Creek. According to oral tradition Chinlac, an important Dakelh village on the Stuart River, was destroyed around 1745 by Tsilhqot'in raiders from Nazko. Chinlac is a provincially significant archaeological site.

The Stuart River is important in British Columbia history, having been the conduit for Simon Fraser's expedition down the Fraser River to present-day Vancouver in 1808. It was first ascended by Fraser's assistant, James McDougall, in 1806. The river and the lake it drains are named for another of Fraser's assistants, John Stuart, who accompanied Simon Fraser when he ascended the Stuart River in 1806 and established Fort St. James at Stuart Lake. In 1809 Stuart succeeded Fraser in the command of the New Caledonia district.

During the Omineca Gold Rush, steamboats ran on the river from the Quesnel area on the Fraser River to Stuart Lake.

== Natural history ==
The Stuart River's watershed is forested with lodgepole pine, spruce, cottonwood, aspen, Douglas fir, and some birch. Understory trees include willow, dogwood, and alder. There are also open grassy hills with dwarf juniper and open, park-like stands of aspen and spruce.

The area provides deer, moose, and elk with winter ranges and riparian feeding areas. A small elk herd lives in the area. Trumpeter swans winter along the upper Stuart. The river supports sturgeon and one of the highest-quality wild sockeye salmon runs in the world. In some years, up to one million sockeye salmon migrate up the river system to the spawning grounds in tributary streams and rivers north of Stuart Lake.

== See also ==
- List of tributaries of the Fraser River
- List of rivers of British Columbia
- Steamboats of the Upper Fraser River in British Columbia
