= Cementation Company =

British construction business

The Cementation Company
- Industry: Construction
- Founded: 1910
- Fate: Acquired
- Successor: Trafalgar House
- Headquarters: Doncaster, UK
- Key people: Abram Rupert Neelands (Chairman)
- Products: Construction
- Parent: Skanska

The Cementation Company is a British civil engineering and construction business. It is currently a part of the Swedish construction and development company Skanska.

Established as the Francois Cementation Company in 1910, the company specialised in a recently patented high-pressure grouting technique. Originally applied to coal mining, the technique was refined and applied to other mining activities and eventually other sectors as well. Early on, several international subsidiaries were created to pursue businesses in various countries. The company's founder, Albert Francois, did not remain at its head for long; throughout much of the interwar period, the company was headed by Abram Rupert Neelands, during which time it became a mildly profitable concern. During 1941, the company adopted the shortened Cementation Company name.

The company's civil engineering capabilities were put to use during the Second World War for the construction of airfields. In the postwar years, the Cementation Company returned to civilian endeavours, providing its services to companies within the hydroelectric and railway sectors amongst other major civil engineering works. During 1970, it was acquired by Trafalgar House. During 2002, the Cementation Company was acquired by Skanska, after which it was rebranded as Cementation Skanska.

== History ==
The company was originally established as the Francois Cementation Company in 1910 by Albert Francois, a Belgian mining engineer who had patented his technique for cement grouting associated with shaft sinking for coal mining. Francois had developed the core principals of his technique by 1896, a key innovation of which being the use of a high-pressure steam-driven cementation pump to apply cement at high pressures. One year after the company's founding, which was based at Doncaster, the first UK-based application of Francois' technique took place at the Hatfield Colliery in Yorkshire; many other collieries adopted the technique in the aftermath of the First World War.

Early on, Francois was keen to seek out business opportunities on the global market. He travelled to South Africa for the first time in 1916 and quickly became involved in the nation's gold mining industry as the grouting technique proved to be beneficial to this sector as well. Throughout the first half of the 20th century, numerous international subsidiaries of the Francois Cementation Company were established, often in economically attractive regions of what was then the British Empire, including Australia, Canada, India, and South Africa.

However, during the late 1910s, the business encountered some difficulties and there were questions raised over its direction. One of the board members, John Alexander Agnew, a director and later chairman of Consolidated Goldfields asked his son-in-law, Abram Rupert Neelands, a Canadian mining engineer, to look over the company and report its prospects. The shareholders were impressed by Rupert's report and asked if he could commit to the company. The offer was accepted on the basis Rupert had "full charge and complete control", and he took over management of the business in 1921. During Rupert's tenure, it started producing a modest profit. During 1941, the company was renamed as the Cementation Company.

During the Second World War, the company undertook the grouting of 15 runways. Throughout the 1950s, it worked on the grouting of several major dams, including the Kariba Dam on the border between Zambia and Zimbabwe and the Dukan Dam in Iraq. In 1967, the Cementation Company acquired Cleveland Bridge & Engineering Company. Three years later, the Cementation Company was acquired by Trafalgar House. During 1984, British prime minister Margaret Thatcher faced conflict-of-interest questions in the House of Commons about the involvement of her son Mark in representing Cementation in its bid to build a university in Oman at a time when the Prime Minister was urging Omanis to buy British.

Throughout the late 20th century, the Cementation Company was involvement in various major civil engineering works. It was often turned to by British Rail and its private predecessor companies to undertake work on specific projects, such as maintenance of the Severn Tunnel. It was involved in the construction of portions of High Speed 1. The firm has also worked on the London Underground. It also secured work on elements of Crossrail and High Speed 2.

During 2001, the company became part of Skanska; shortly thereafter, it was rebranded as Cementation Skanska. Preferring to focus its attention on the northern hemisphere, Skanska arranged the sale of Cementation's subsidiaries in the Australian, Canadian and South African markets during 2003.

During May 2018, Skanska publicly stated that it intended to divest Cementation Skanska and was actively searching for a new owner. At one point, active negotiations were underway for Morrisroe to acquire the division. However, in mid 2019, Skanska announced that it no longer intended to sell Cementation Skanska and would retain ownership for the foreseeable future.

== Sources ==
- O'Driscoll, Dick (January 2010). 100 Years of Cementation (PDF). Skanska. Archived from the original (PDF) on 15 December 2013.
