= Hoare Govett =

Former British corporate brokerage business

- Industry: Finance
- Founded: Govett, Sons & Co 1869; Hoare & Co. Govett 1969; Hoare Govett 1976
- Successor: Jefferies Group
- Headquarters: City of London
- Area served: United Kingdom
- Key people: Francis Algernon Govett; Christopher "Kit" Hoare; Peter Meinertzhagen
- Products: Stockbroker; Business broker Data broker
- Parent: Security Pacific 1984-92; ABN Amro 1992-2007; Royal Bank of Scotland 2007-2012; Jefferies Group 2012-

Hoare Govett was a major British corporate brokerage firm based in London, England. The business was created by a merger between two well established stockbroker firms, Hoare & Co and Govett, Sons & Co. From 1984, the business had been a subsidiary, firstly owned by Security Pacific, until its own near collapse and purchase by Bank of America in 1992, when ABN Amro duly purchased the business. ABN Amro itself was purchased by Royal Bank of Scotland in 2007, before the business was sold on to the Jefferies Group, becoming their corporate broking arm in 2012.

== Pre-merger history ==
=== Govett, Sons & Co ===
Govett, Sons & Co was started in 1869 by Adolphus Frederick Govett of Laleham, who was also a director of the London and South Western Railway. His son, Francis Algernon Govett joined the business as a partner in 1879, while Sir William Rose, 2nd Baronet was a business partner in the firm. Under Francis, Govett, Sons & Co were big players in brokering for the development of the Australian gold fields. Francis's sons, Frederick Leonard and John Romaine, became partners in the business, and Francis led the firm until his death in 1926. In 1929, Govett, Sons & Co were one of the three brokers that raised $11,000,000 as part of the issue for the Great Britain and Canada Investment Corporation.

=== Hoare & Co ===
Hoare & Co started life in the 19th century as Cohen Laming & Co, a brokerage business. In 1910, Christopher "Kit" Gurney Hoare joined the business, becoming a partner by the end of the year, with the firm then becoming known as Cohen, Laming, Hoare. Kit Hoare was described in Martin Vander Weyer's article in The Spectator as "A splendid pirate (who) would have boarded any ship’". Kit and the firm were caught up in the Charles Hatry affair, with Kit being one of the first brokers to be interviewed. Until 1939, Nigel Birch, Baron Rhyl was a partner in the firm. Under Kit's control as senior partner from the 1930 through to the 1960s, the business was renamed Hoare & Co in 1940; he was behind many of the lucrative deals of his day, gaining the business of ICI, Vickers, Distillers, and P&O Kit reportedly never carried any paper on him, and used to underwrite issues based on the company's name alone. The firm were behind large share issues for Canadian Eagle Oil, Rootes Group, Anglo-Iranian, Dunlop, P&O, Esso and were part of the denationalisation of the British steel industry. Hoares were the main broker behind the 1957 BP debenture issue, where Kit had been able to exclude rival brokers Cazenove to the disgust of their boss Anthony Hornsby, who then blocked Hoare & Co from the £40 million Shell rights issue. Kit was the broker involved with the 1961 merger of the two London merchant banks Kleinwort and Benson to form Kleinwort Benson Lonsdale. Hoare & Co were also a broker for the UK government and issued gilts on their behalf. During 1964, the firm set up a new research department called the Investment Research Section, later called Datastream, looking into using computers to provide their staff with data on companies. Hoare & Co temporarily declined as a broker during the late 60s due to Kit's age, with the company only brokering 42 issues during 1965, the far smallest of the corporate brokers in London, with Cazenove issuing 176 in the same year. In the same year, Peter Meinertzhagen joined Hoare's as a mail clerk, and would become an influential figure in its future.

== Hoare Govett History ==
=== Early years ===
In 1969, the brokerage firms of Hoare & Co and Govett, Sons & Co merged to firm Hoare & Co. Govett. The newly merged business was soon recognised as amongst the elite of corporate bankers. The company started to offer its Datastream service to other brokers and investment banks, including Touche Remnant. In 1973, Peter Meinertzhagen, the former mail boy, had worked his way up and became a partner in the business. The firm survived the Secondary banking crisis of 1973–1975 mainly because of its presence in the gilt-edged market, even though it had been involved with the failed investment bank Cornhill Consolidated. According to EDP Analyzer in 1974, the firm were the largest stockbroker in the United Kingdom, however by 1976 it had dropped down to third. In 1976, the business was put into liquidation by its partners, with two new firms being created, Hoare Govett and Datastream Ltd, who would both be owned by the same shareholders. Datastream was then sold off to the British Oxygen Company, so Hoare Govett could concentrate on stock brokering.

=== The 1980s and Security Pacific ===
In the 1981 privatisation sale by the UK government of British Aerospace, Hoare Govett was the lead broker, also acting as the lead broker in the second tranche of sales in 1985. Hoare Govett also assisted the government's flotation of British Telecom in 1983 as one of several brokers involved.

In 1982, with Hoare Govett run by Mike Soden, Security Pacific bought a 29.9% stake in the business for £8.1 million, with the funds received being split between new investments and bonus for the company's partners. At the time, Hoare Govett was one of the leading foreign stockbrokers in Singapore, Hong Kong and Australia. Security Pacific purchased a larger share in the business for $14 million in 1984.

In 1986, the British government changed rules on stocks and shares trading, as the London Stock Exchange was breaking the 1976 Restrictive Practices Act. Called the Big Bang, Hoare Govett, along with fellow brokers Cazenove and Rowe & Pitman, set up for 24 hour trading. This was dropped after the Big Bang did not produce the rush that was expected. Hoare Govett purchased and then sold on 14 million Guinness held shares in BP in the same year, and was chosen by the UK government to help prepare for the sale of the ten water companies as part of privatisation of the market.

During 1987, Hoare Govett were the lead brokers for final tranche of government BP share issue, but were affected by the collapse of the stock market in October 1987, a few days before the issue closed, with $12.2 million of shares unsold. The firm was also involved with the share issue for the privatisation of BAA. In November 1987, Security Pacific announced they were purchasing the remaining 15% in the firm to secure their commitment to the business and its debts and equities. In 1987, the Hoare Govett Smaller Companies Index was created by Hoare Govett from research by Professors Elroy Dimson and Paul Marsh at the London Business School, and would become the authoritative benchmark for measuring small-cap performance.

Hoare Govett's Asian business and Barclays Bank set up a joint venture investment management company in Hong Kong in 1988. During 1989, the business withdrew from the British and International bond markets, and was leaving the Japanese Market for shares and warrants. In the UK, the firm were the lead broker on Shanks & McKewan, a Glasgow based waste disposal company share issue which capitalised the company at £136 million. In 1990, chairman Richard Westmacott suddenly quit the job, and Peter Meinertzhagen was asked to become chairman. In 1991, the firm were the lead broker of the demerger of Vodafone from its parent company Racal Electronics.

Security Pacific had been trying to offload the firm from 1989, as part of its retraction back to commercial banking. At first a management buyout tried to purchase the business, but was blocked by Bank of America as part of the merger talks, and it was announced in February 1992 that ABN Amro were purchasing the European side of the business. The Asian arm of the business, Hoare Govett Asia, was purchased by the management team with assistance from the Guoco group.

=== Under ABN Amro ===
In 1992 ABN Amro purchased the firm from Security Pacific for an undisclosed price, though widely reportedly as £25 million; shortly after, however, they lost several clients including RTZ Corporation and Henlys Group. The firm was the lead broker for the UK government's privatisation of Northern Ireland Electricity, and the public listing of the former commercial arm of the Milk Marketing Board, which was named Dairy Crest. The firm, now renamed ABN Amro Hoare Govett, recovered from those early loses, gaining Glaxo in 1995 from S.G. Warburg, and started the purchase back of its former Asian business, now called HG Asia, firstly acquiring a 20% share in 1994, followed by a further 40% in 1996. During 1996, it assisted the UK government with share sales in both British Energy and Railtrack, while in 1997 it gained both the clients Sainsbury's and Centrica.

In 2004, due to ill health, Peter Meinertzhagen stepped down and was replaced by Nigel Mills, whom Meinertzhagen had chosen to replace himself. However, in 2005, as part of their push into the brokerage market, Citigroup poached Mills and many of the other top executives at Hoare Govett. Meinertzhagen was asked to come back to steady the ship, but during 2005-06 they lost several big clients, including Cadbury Schweppes, Sainsbury's, Centrica, WHSmith, though they did fight back, gaining Fidessa and Hanson. In 2006, Meinertzhagen chose Paul Nicholls of Crédit Suisse to come in as the new chief executive, and he eventually retired from the business in 2007. ITV announced it was dropping Hoare Govett as one of its corporate brokers in February 2007; Hoare Govett pointed out that they still had clients such as Imperial Tobacco, BAE Systems and Arriva, and had gained new business in the shape of FKI and Spectris.

=== Royal Bank of Scotland tenure ===
In October 2007, Royal Bank of Scotland, along with bid partners Fortis Group and Banco Santander purchased ABN Amro for £48.5 billion. The business was split up amongst the bid partners with Hoare Govett becoming RBS Hoare Govett. The firm struggled due to the 2008 financial crisis, dropping from 2nd in the corporate brokerage tables to 8th, but started a turnaround in 2010 gaining its first new FTSE 100 customer, Cable & Wireless Worldwide, followed not long after by G4S making the firm joint broker with Deutsche Bank. In 2011, it was reported that RBS were either planning to sell or close down Hoare Govett, with various companies linked with purchasing the business including Oriel Securities, ICAP and RBC Royal. In February it was announced that Jefferies Group had agreed to purchase Hoare Govett's European business. In March 2012, it was announced that the RBS Asian business, the former Hoare Govett Asia firm, had been sold to CIMB Group Holdings, except for its Hong Kong office which was closed. The Hoare Govett Small Cap Index was sold separately in 2012 to Numis.

=== Jefferies group purchase ===
Jefferies Group bought Hoare Govett for £1, with the business changed to Jefferies Hoare Govett, with the firm brokering for Rolls-Royce Holdings, BAE Systems, Rexam, Morrisons and Tate & Lyle amongst others. The company initially lost clients in 2012 including Tullow Oil and Mouchel, but soon gained new customers during 2012-13 including Sirius Minerals, United Drug, Cairn Energy and Thomas Cook Group. In 2016, Oxford Biomedica announced Jefferies Hoare Govett as their corporate broker. In 2021, the firm were the broker for Rolls-Royce's sale of its Nuclear Instrumentation and Control business to Framatome. As of 2024, Jefferies Hoare Govett have clients including Hays plc, Boohoo Group and Watkin Jones plc.
