= John Alexander Agnew =

New Zealand mining engineer and businessman

- John A. Agnew
- Born: 1872; New Zealand
- Died: August 2, 1939 (aged 66–67); Trona, California, U.S.A.
- Occupation: Mining engineer
- Children: Dolf Agnew
- Relatives: Sir Rudolph Agnew (grandson)

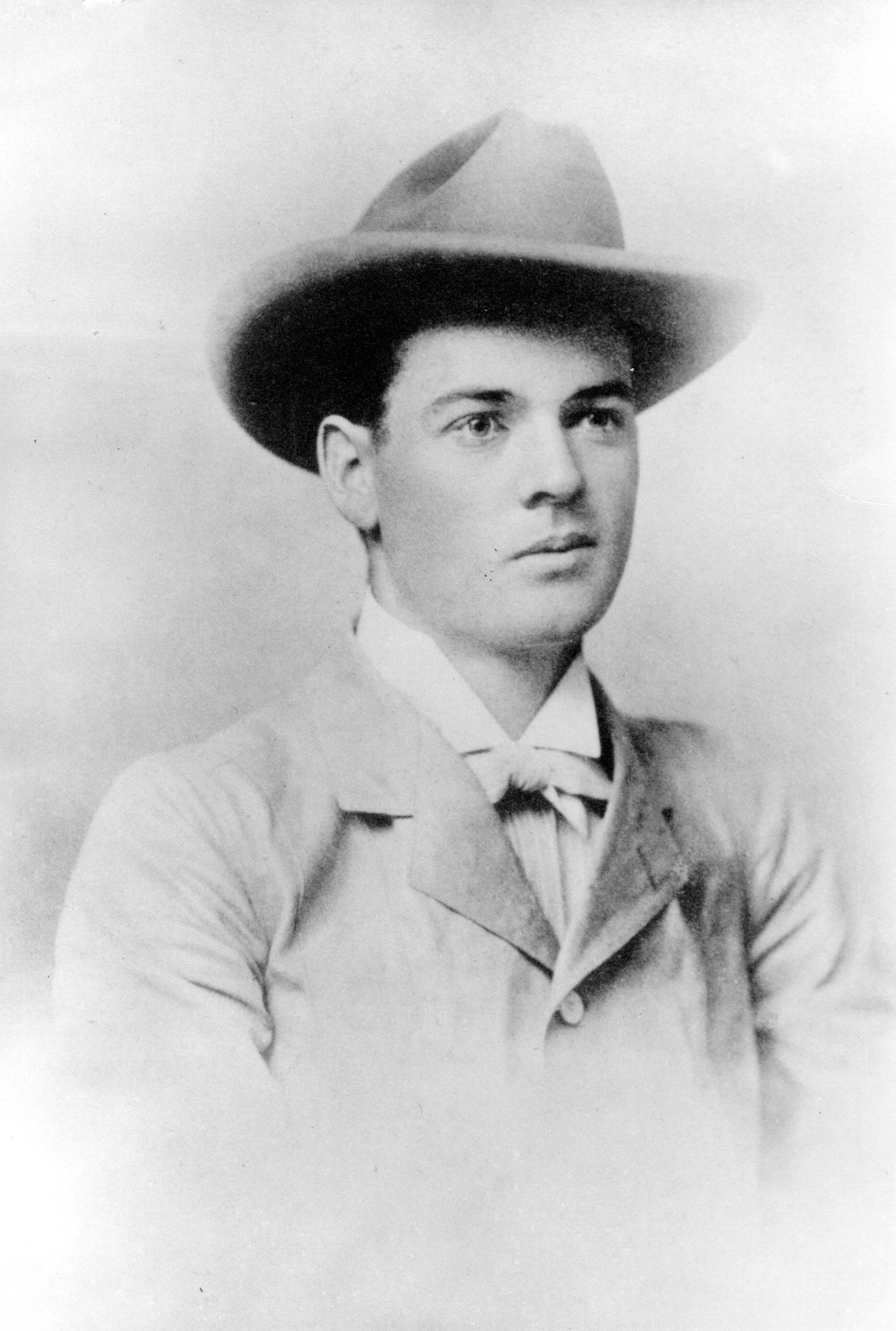
Herbert Hoover in 1898, photographed in Perth, Western Australia.

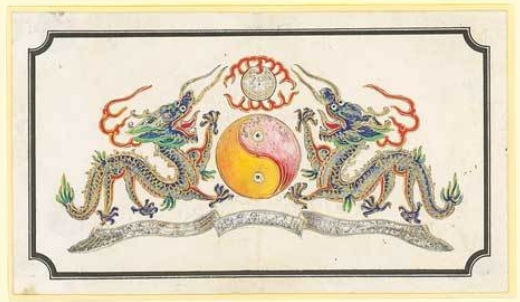
An unadopted hand-drawn essay for the 1878–83 Large Dragon stamps of China bought by John Agnew from Sir Robert Hart. Subsequently, acquired by Sir Percival David and latterly by Meiso Mizuhara.

John Alexander Agnew (1872 – 2 August 1939) was a New Zealand mining engineer who worked with future United States president Herbert Hoover and later became chairman of Consolidated Gold Fields, the first chairman of the firm to be from a mining engineering background. In his spare time he was a noted philatelist whose collection of Chinese stamps and postal history was regarded as one of the finest of his era.

== Early life and family ==
John Alexander Agnew was born in New Zealand in 1872. He studied under professor James Park at the University of Otago School of Mines.

His son was Dolf Agnew and his grandson was Sir Rudolph Agnew, group chief executive of Consolidated Goldfields plc from 1978 to 1989 and chairman from 1983 to 1989.

Agnew was a board member of the Cementation Company, and asked his son-in-law Abram Rupert Neelands, a Canadian mining engineer to look over the company and report its prospects. The shareholders were impressed with a report produced by Rupert, and asked if he could commit to the company. The offer was accepted on the basis Rupert had 'full charge and complete control', and he took over management of the business in 1921.

== Career ==
Agnew's early career was at the Thames Goldfield in New Zealand where he became the mine manager. In 1898 he moved to Western Australia where he worked for Bewick Moreing & Company under mining engineer and future American president Herbert Hoover. He travelled with Hoover to China but returned to Australia in 1903 when their work was interrupted by the Boxer Rebellion. In 1912 he resigned from Bewick Moreing and travelled to London where Hoover had mining interests.

Based in London, Agnew travelled widely and particularly in north and South America and was involved with Herbert Hoover and Francis Algernon Govett in Lake View and Oroya Exploration Limited, Lake View and Star Limited, Camp Bird Limited, and Santa Gertrudis Limited. After the First World War he was involved with the Burma Corporation Limited among other companies. He became a director of Consolidated Gold Fields in 1922 and chairman in March 1933, succeeding the fourth Lord Brabourne. Agnew was the first mining engineer to hold the position. He held a large number of other company appointments as director or chairman and it was thought by some that in some cases his appointments and shareholdings were on behalf of Herbert Hoover who had resigned his company appointments after 1919.

He was credited by The Times with playing a leading part in the renaissance of mining in Western Australia, particularly at Lake View and Wiluna, and a similarly important role in the development of mining in the Gold Coast, the Far West Rand, and gold-dredging at Bulolo in New Guinea.

Agnew joined the Institution of Mining and Metallurgy in 1906 and served on its council. He was awarded their gold medal in 1934. He was chairman of the Western Australian Mine Owners' Association.

The gold mining town of Agnew, Western Australia is named after him. In 1949, the gold mine closed. An operating gold mine is located adjacent to the townsite, and is also named Agnew. The mine is owned by Gold Fields.

== Philately ==
Agnew specialised in the stamps and postal history of China and built a collection that was rumoured to be housed in 60 albums and was regarded as one of the finest of his time. He bought most of the proofs and essays owned by Sir Robert Hart after Hart's death in 1911.

He became a member of the Royal Philatelic Society London in 1923, and a fellow in 1927, and in December that year he gave a display to the society on the essays of the first stamps of China, his paper on the subject appearing in The London Philatelist in February 1928. In 1929, he displayed his collection of "The Treaty Ports of China" to the society and his paper on that subject was published in the journal for December 1929. He was awarded the society's Tilleard Medal the same year for his 1927 display.

Among his awards for competitive displays were a gold medal for his North Borneo at the Strasburg Philatelic Exhibition of 1927, and gold medals for his China displays at the International Philatelic Exhibition, Le Havre, in 1929 and at the 1930 Antwerp exhibition.

It is likely that after his death, much of his collection, possibly the whole of it, was acquired by Sir Percival David, whose collection, sold by Robson Lowe between 1964 and 1975, is thought to be the most important of China ever assembled. Material from David's collection, including items formerly owned by Agnew, in turn entered the Meiso Mizuhara collection.

== Death ==
In June 1939, Agnew left England on a tour of the mining interests of the Yukon Consolidated Gold Corporation, of which he was the president, on the edge of the Arctic Circle. He also visited properties in the United States. He died at Trona, California, from pneumonia on 2 August 1939. His home in London at the time of his death was in West Heath Avenue, Hampstead.
