= Eco Central =

Climate change denial group

Eco Central is a climate change denial group set up by Matthew MacKinnon, director of the pro-Brexit think tank, Centre for Welsh Studies. The organization uses Facebook adverts to spread false and misleading information against what it sees as "climate alarmism".

Previously, Eco Central's campaigns featured doctored images of child environmental activist Greta Thunberg. A Facebook banner for the organisation labelled Sir David Attenborough an "eco hypocrite".

== Origins ==
In November 2020, The Independent newspaper and environmental investigations outlet DeSmog conducted an investigation into the group which found that Matthew MacKinnon, director of Centre for Welsh Studies, a pro-Brexit think based in Cardiff set up the organisation.

Eco Central spent approximately four thousand pounds on adverts intended to dissuade the public from taking action on climate change.

== False claims ==
Eco Central's Facebook campaigns make a number of false claims, which include:

- Policies designed to limit global omissions contributed to unprecedented wildfires seen in Australia and California.
- Sir David Attenborough's campaign to prevent environmental catastrophe is Fake News.
- Those campaigning for action on fuel emissions are part of a cult.
- The group's literature claims that “climate change is a hoax perpetrated by politicians, the media, and celebrities”.

It also opposes the teaching of climate change in schools.

== Notable members ==
- James Davies (politician)
- Sarah Atherton MP
- David Jones (Clwyd West MP)

== See also ==
- European Research Group
