= Endgame (2009 film) =

- Theatrical release poster
- Directed by: Pete Travis
- Written by: Paula Milne
- Produced by: Hal Vogel
- Starring: William Hurt; Chiwetel Ejiofor; Jonny Lee Miller; Mark Strong; Derek Jacobi
- Cinematography: David Odd
- Edited by: Clive Barrett; Dominic Strevens
- Music by: Martin Phipps
- Distributed by: Target Entertainment; Monterey Media
- Release date: 18 January 2009 (Sundance)
- Running time: 101 minutes
- Country: United Kingdom
- Language: English

Endgame is a 2009 British film directed by Pete Travis from a script by Paula Milne, based upon the book The Fall of Apartheid by Robert Harvey. The film is produced by Daybreak Pictures and reunites Travis with Vantage Point actor William Hurt. It also stars Chiwetel Ejiofor, Jonny Lee Miller, and Mark Strong. The film dramatises the final days of apartheid in South Africa. It was filmed at locations in Reading in England and Cape Town, South Africa in the first half of 2008 and was completed in December that year.

The film had its world premiere on 18 January 2009 at the Sundance Film Festival and was broadcast on Channel 4 on 4 May 2009. It also had an international theatrical release, the distribution of which was handled by Target Entertainment Group.

== Plot ==
The film depicts the final days of apartheid, focusing on secret talks held between the African National Congress and the members of the National Party in a country house in Somerset, England. The film focuses on the relationship that develops between Willie Esterhuyse and Thabo Mbeki.

The secret talks were brokered by Michael Young, a British businessman who worked for Consolidated Gold Fields, a firm with considerable interests in South Africa. The talks took place in Mells Park House, a country house near Frome in Somerset. The house was then owned by Consolidated Gold Fields.

Consolidated Gold Fields was a company with interests in South Africa which is the subject of sanctions by other nations. In one scene, Young and Rudolf Agnew, chairman of Consolidated Gold Fields, leave their offices in London and are mobbed by anti-apartheid protesters who batter and chase their car, unaware that the two men are sponsoring the very talks that are leading to the end of the system they oppose.

In an interview on BBC Radio 4's Today programme on 24 April 2009, Michael Young mentioned how he had been asked by Thabo Mbeki to write the final chapter of the 2003 book by Robert Harvey on the Fall of Apartheid, the chapter titled "Endgame", on which this film is based.

== Cast ==
- William Hurt as Willie Esterhuyse, professor of philosophy at Stellenbosch University
- Chiwetel Ejiofor as Thabo Mbeki, director of information for the African National Congress
- Jonny Lee Miller as Michael Young, director of communications for Consolidated Gold Fields
- Mark Strong as Niel Barnard, head of the National Intelligence Service
- Derek Jacobi as Rudolph Agnew, chairman of Consolidated Gold Fields
- Timothy West as P.W. Botha, State President of South Africa
- Matthew Marsh as F.W. de Klerk, State President of South Africa
- Ramon Tikaram as Aziz Pahad, international arm of ANC
- Clarke Peters as Nelson Mandela
- Danny Scheinmann as Albie Sachs, anti-apartheid activist
- Patrick Lyster as Sampie Terreblanche, professor of economics at Stellenbosch University
- Stephen Jennings as Kobie Coetsee, Minister of Justice
- John Kani as Oliver Tambo, the former President of the African National Congress
- Faith Ndukwana as Winnie Mandela, spouse of Mandela

== Production ==
The film has its roots in a discussion between Daybreak Pictures executive producer David Aukin and former Director-General of the BBC Greg Dyke; when Dyke told Aukin that he wanted to make a documentary about the secret talks that ended apartheid, Aukin suggested turning it into a drama instead. Aukin had previously produced the acclaimed political drama The Government Inspector.

Aukin and his production partner Hal Vogel contacted Paula Milne to write the script. She spent 18 months on the screenplay and researched the history of the talks by speaking to Thabo Mbeki and Michael Young in South Africa. Pete Travis, director of Omagh (2004) and Vantage Point (2008), was sent the script by Milne. Travis was not interested in directing a historical drama about recent events and decided to turn the film into a political thriller. William Hurt and Chiwetel Ejiofor were first to be cast. Hurt, who played President Henry Ashton in Vantage Point, was cast as Will Esterhuyse because Travis wanted to cast actors he had worked with before. Other actors were interested in the part even after Hurt had signed on. Travis wanted to work with Ejiofor, who was his first choice for the part of Thabo Mbeki.

Location scouting in South Africa was done in January 2008. Rehearsals began on 14 April 2008 and scenes set in the UK were filmed for the rest of the month at a large country house near Reading, Berkshire. The production moved to Cape Town in May, where location filming was done for six weeks. Production wrapped in August. Martin Phipps composed the film soundtrack. The final cut of the film was completed on 24 December 2008.

== Release ==
Target Entertainment sold the international theatrical distribution rights in 2008 at the Cannes Film Festival and the American Film Market for release in 2009. Endgame had its world premiere on 18 January 2009 at the Sundance Film Festival, in the International Narrative Feature Films category. The film was originally slated to be a major part of Channel 4's "Apartheid Season", and was previously scheduled for broadcast in mid-2008. It premiered in the UK at the Human Rights Watch Film Festival in March and was broadcast on Channel 4 on 4 May. It had its American television premiere on 25 October 2009 on Masterpiece Contemporary on PBS. This was followed by a theatrical release on 30 October through Monterey Media in select U.S. cities.

== Reception ==
Overnight ratings indicated that Endgame's first Channel 4 broadcast was seen by 837,000 viewers (a 3.9% audience share). 64,000 more watched on Channel 4's one-hour timeshift service, Channel 4+1. A repeat on the evening of 9 May got 336,000 viewers (1.7% share) on Channel 4 and 35,000 on Channel 4+1.

The film's reception was mixed. Review aggregator website Rotten Tomatoes reported that 71% of critics gave the film a positive review based on seven reviews, with an average rating of 6.46/10. On Metacritic, the film has a weighted average score of 55 out of 100 based on four critics, indicating "mixed or average reviews". The Daily Telegraph praised Lee Miller's performance but argued that "the elements never quite cohered". The newspaper concluded that the script "seemed too fuzzy in its focus, and also too eager to write history with an unambiguously broad brush." Other publications praised the film. In contrast with The Telegraph, The Independent praised the script "Paula Milne's script skilfully interspersed talk with action". The Times rated the film four out of five stars. It also won a Peabody Award in 2009.
