= Numis =

British institutional stockbroker and corporate advisor

Numis Corporation Plc
- Type: Public
- Traded as: LSE: NUM
- Founded: 1989; 37 years ago
- Headquarters: London, United Kingdom
- Revenue: ▲£155.2 million (2020)
- Operating income: ▲£36.8 million (2020)
- Net income: ▲£31.3 million (2020)
- Number of employees: 330 (2023)
- Parent: Deutsche Bank (2023–present)
- Website: numis.com

Numis Corporation Plc is an institutional stockbroker and corporate advisor with its main headquarters in the City of London. It currently employs around 235 staff in London and New York City.

By the autumn of 2017, the firm had 195 stock market clients, and a February 2018 report by Adviser Rankings Ltd found that it was broker to eleven of the largest fifty firms in London's Alternative Investment Market.

== History ==
The firm was originally formed in 1989 as a merger between Hemsley & Co Securities and Raphael Zorn and was known by the name of RZH Ltd before rebranding as Numis in 2000.

The Hoare Govett Small Cap Index was purchased in 2012 from Hoare Govett.

In 2016, Oliver Hemsley stood down as Numis CEO after 25 years. Alex Ham and Ross Mitchinson succeeded Hemsley as co-CEOs, with Ham running the firm's advisory and corporate broking arm and Mitchinson its equities business.

In April 2023, Deutsche Bank agreed to acquire Numis in an all-cash deal valued at £410 million. When the purchase was completed on October 13, it was announced that it could be known as Deutsche Numis.
