= Willie Esterhuyse =

Professor Willie Esterhuyse OLS
- Born: Willem Petrus Esterhuyse; 19 August 1936 (age 89); Laingsburg, Cape Province, Union of South Africa (now Western Cape)
- Citizenship: South African citizenship
- Education: University of Stellenbosch
- Spouse: Annemarie Esterhuyse
- Children: 2 daughters, 4 sons

Willem Petrus "Willie" Esterhuyse, OLS (born 19 August 1936) is an emeritus professor of philosophy and business ethics at the University of Stellenbosch, South Africa, a columnist and critic of apartheid.

== Early life ==
Willem Petrus Esterhuyse was born in 1936 in Laingsburg, Cape Province, Union of South Africa (now Western Cape). He married Annemarie Esterhuyse, née Barnard, a lecturer in mathematics at the University of Stellenbosch. They have two daughters and four sons.

== Academic career ==
Esterhuyse studied from 1958 to 1964 at the University of Stellenbosch, gaining his doctorate. He was from 1965 to 1967 a senior lecturer at University College in Durban. Then he was until 1974 a senior lecturer in Philosophy at the Rand Afrikaans University (RAU). In 1974, he was appointed Professor of Philosophy at the University of Stellenbosch. He has also been associated with the Graduate School of Business of the Stellenbosch University as well as University of Cape Town - UCT where he taught business ethics.

== Journalism career ==
Esterhuyse was also a longtime columnist for the financial magazine F & T Weekly, Die Burger, Beeld and Die Volksblad on ethical and socio-political issues. He has written many articles about South African politics and was a critic of apartheid until its abolition.

== Business background ==
He served as a director of various institutions e.g. more recently

- Barinor Holdings Ltd (chairperson)
- Sanlam Demutualisation Trust (trustee)
- Thabo Mbeki Foundation (TMF) (trustee)

and previously:

- Murray & Roberts
- Metropolitan Holdings
- Medi-Clinic
- Plexus
- Stellenbosch Vineyards

Esterhuyse was portrayed by William Hurt in the 2009 film Endgame.

== Awards ==
His awards includes the Stals Prize for Philosophy by the Academy of Arts and Science in 1984. In 2003, the University of Stellenbosch awarded him an honorary doctorate. He was awarded the Order of Luthuli in Silver by the President of South Africa.

Other awards are:

- Sunday Times Prestige Prize for Political Literature (1981)
- Visiting Professor of the Year, UCT Graduate School of Business (1997)
- NP van Wyk Louw Medal, SA Akademie vir Wetenskap en Kuns (1999)
- Leon Fox Community Relations Award
- Institute for Personnel Management, Presidential Award (1999)
- Professor of the Year (2000-2001), University of Nijenrode, The Netherlands (2001)
- Medal of Honour, Former Student Council Chairpersons, Stellenbosch University (2002)

== Bibliography ==
- FW Nietzsche: Philosopher with a Hammer (1975)
- Farewell of Apartheid (1979)
- NP van Wyk Louw's Proceedings of God (1979)
- The Man and His Sexual Morals (1980)
- Apartheid Must Die (1981)
- The Path of Reform (1982)
- Karl Marx: Philosopher of the Revolution (1984)
- Advocate for Hope (about Dr. Anton Rupert) (1986)
- Modern Political Ideologies (co-author) (1987)
- Grace unparalleled (1988)
- Brothers out of earshot (1989)
- The Myth Makers (1990) (in collaboration with Pierre du Toit)
- The ANC (Associate Editor) (1991)
- Business Ethics in Practice (1991)
- Intellectually in context: essays Hennie Rossouw (co-writer)
- Thabo Mbeki: Africa - The Time has Come (associate editor) (1998)
- Thabo Mbeki: Africa: Define Yourself (associate editor) (2002)
- Anton Rupert: A biography (in collaboration with Ebbe Dommisse) (2005)
- God en die gode van Egipte. In die voetspore van die onsienlike ... (2009)
- Die God van Genesis ... drama in die amfiteater van die Oneindige (2010)
- Eindstryd – Geheime gesprekke en die einde van Apartheid // Endgame - Secret Talks and the End of Apartheid (2012)
- God and the gods of Egypt (2009)
- Die Tronkgesprekke - Nelson Mandela en Kobie Coetsee se voorpuntdiplomasie (in collaboration with Gerhard van Niekerk)

== Notes ==
"Willie Esterhuyse ." Stellenbosch Writers. N.p., n.d. Web. 7 Apr. 2011. <Stellenbosch Writers>
