= Meiso Mizuhara =

Japanese philatelist

Meiso Mizuhara

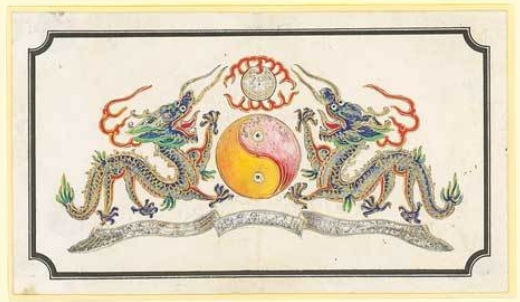
An unadopted hand-drawn essay for the 1878–83 Large Dragon stamps of China bought by John Agnew from Sir Robert Hart. Subsequently, acquired by Sir Percival David and latterly by Meiso Mizuhara

Meiso Mizuhara (水原 明窗, Mizuhara Meisō; 1924 – November 1993) was a Japanese philatelist who was known for his award-winning collections of the stamps and postal history of the countries of Asia and his books on those subjects. His collection of Chinese stamps and postal history was exceeded in importance only by that of Sir Percival David.

== Collecting ==
Mizuhara was one of the founders of the Japanese Philatelic Society in 1946, through which he sought to re-establish philately in Japan after the end of the Second World War. He later was instrumental in the creation of The Philatelic Museum in Mejiro, Tokyo.

His collection of Chinese stamps and postal history rivaled and in some areas exceeded that of Sir Percival David, whose collection, sold by Robson Lowe between 1964 and 1975, is thought to be the most important ever assembled. Mizuhara's collection included items once owned by David, including material that David acquired from John A. Agnew.

== Writing ==
Mizuhara wrote 15 books, mainly presenting his own collections for posterity. His last book, completed just before his death, was his account of Korean postal history from 1884 to 1905, originally published in Japanese in 1993. In the forward he explained that the book was partly a response to the failure of the official Japanese Post Office book celebrating the 120th anniversary of the postal service in Japan to mention Korea, despite the great effect that the Japanese have had on the history of Korea. The book won Large Vermeil medals at the Bangkok 93, China 96 and Pacific 97 philatelic exhibitions. The English translation (1998) won a gold medal at Singpex 98, and a Large Vermeil medal at Italia 98.

== Death and legacy ==
Mizuhara died in November 1993. His collection was auctioned by Spink & Son in a series of sales structured around his original exhibition write-ups and described as "Exhibition collections":

- German post offices in China, November 2001.
- Tibet, October 2002.
- United States post offices in China, December 2003.
- Mongolia, January 2011.
- Korean postal history, 1884–1905, January 2013.
- Chinese customs post, January 2016.

== Selected publications ==
- Catalog of the Chinese liberation area stamps 1930–49. Japan Philatelic Society, Tokyo, 1988. ISBN 978-4889634037
- Korean postal history, 1884–1905. Japan Philatelic Society Foundation, Tokyo, 1993. (Japanese language) ISBN 4889634959
- Korean postal history, 1884–1905. Japan Philatelic Publications, Tokyo, 1998. (English language)
