= David Maclean, Baron Blencathra =

United Kingdom Conservative Party politician (born 1953)

The Right Honourable The Lord Blencathra PC
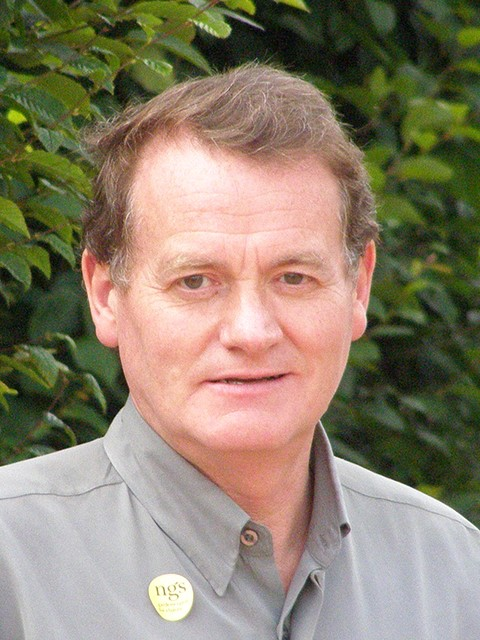

Shadow Minister for Environment, Food and Rural Affairs
- Incumbent
- Assumed office 1 September 2024
- Leader: Rishi Sunak; Kemi Badenoch

Shadow Minister for Energy Security and Net Zero
- Incumbent
- Assumed office 17 September 2026
- Leader: Kemi Badenoch
- Preceded by: The Lord Moynihan

Opposition Chief Whip of the House of Commons
- In office 18 September 2001 – 7 December 2005
- Leader: Iain Duncan Smith; Michael Howard
- Preceded by: James Arbuthnot
- Succeeded by: Patrick McLoughlin

Minister of State for Home Affairs
- In office 27 May 1993 – 2 May 1997
- Prime Minister: John Major
- Preceded by: Michael Jack
- Succeeded by: Alun Michael

Minister of State for Environment and Countryside
- In office 14 April 1992 – 27 May 1993
- Prime Minister: John Major
- Preceded by: David Trippier
- Succeeded by: Tim Yeo

Lord Commissioner of the Treasury
- In office 27 July 1988 – 24 July 1989
- Prime Minister: Margaret Thatcher
- Preceded by: Peter Lloyd
- Succeeded by: John Taylor

Member of the House of Lords
- Lord Temporal
- Life peerage 28 February 2011

Member of Parliament for Penrith and The Border
- In office 28 July 1983 – 12 April 2010
- Preceded by: William Whitelaw
- Succeeded by: Rory Stewart

Personal details
- Born: 16 May 1953 (age 73) Cromarty, Scotland
- Party: Conservative
- Education: University of Aberdeen
- Website: Official website

David John Maclean, Baron Blencathra, PC (born 16 May 1953) is a Conservative Party life peer. He was the Member of Parliament (MP) for Penrith and The Border from 1983 to 2010.

== Early and later life ==
Born in Scotland, Maclean was educated at Fortrose Academy, Fortrose, and at the University of Aberdeen.

== Parliamentary career ==
After unsuccessfully contesting Inverness, Nairn and Lochaber at the 1983 general election, he was elected to the House of Commons in a by-election seven weeks later, following the ennoblement of William Whitelaw. He took his seat when the House returned from summer recess in October.

In Margaret Thatcher's government, Maclean served as a government whip from 1987 to 1989, when he was appointed as Parliamentary Secretary to the Ministry of Agriculture, Fisheries and Food, retaining the position when John Major took over as Prime Minister in 1990.

Following the 1992 general election, he was promoted to Minister of State at the Department of the Environment, and in 1993, he was moved to the post of Minister of State at the Home Office, a position he held until the Conservative Party's defeat at the 1997 general election. He turned down an offer to join the Cabinet, probably as Minister for Agriculture, in 1995, stating that he was 'a round peg in a round hole'.

Under William Hague's leadership in opposition, he returned to the backbenches until 2001, when the new leader Iain Duncan Smith promoted him to opposition Chief Whip. When Duncan Smith lost a vote of confidence in 2003, Maclean tendered his resignation but was reappointed to the position under new leader Michael Howard. He returned to the back benches when David Cameron was elected as leader in 2005.

During the 2005 general election and since, he has worked extensively with the pro hunting group Vote-OK, with the aim of returning a Conservative Government in order to have the Hunting Act 2004 repealed.

Maclean made the headlines in 2007, when he proposed a private members bill that would have exempted the Houses of Parliament from the Freedom of Information Act. The bill proved controversial, with the government unofficially supporting the bill.

Maclean said that "My bill is necessary to give an absolute guarantee that the correspondence of members of parliament, on behalf of our constituents and others, to a public authority remains confidential." The Bill was passed by the House of Commons on 18 May 2007, but has so far failed to find a sponsor in the House of Lords.

A report by the House of Lords Select Committee on the Constitution, published on 20 June 2007, said the Bill "does not meet the requirements of caution and proportionality in enacting legislation of constitutional importance."

In its report the Constitutional Affairs Committee in the Commons said "we have been sent no evidence indicating a need for such an exemption or that existing protections for constituents' correspondence were inadequate." Gordon Brown's green paper on constitutional reform, 'The Governance of Britain', says "It is right that Parliament should be covered by the Act", indicating that the Bill's main proposal will not become law.

On 26 June 2009, Maclean told his constituency Conservative Association that he would not stand at the following election, because of worsening multiple sclerosis.

=== Expenses claims ===
Maclean was reported in The Daily Telegraph as having spent more than £20,000 improving his farmhouse under the Additional Costs Allowance (ACA) scheme before selling it for £750,000. He claimed the money by designating the property as his "second home" with the Commons authorities, yet Maclean did not pay capital gains tax on the sale because the taxman accepted it was his main home.

Maclean was one of 98 MPs who voted to keep their expense details secret.

== House of Lords ==
On 28 February 2011, Maclean was created a life peer, as Baron Blencathra, of Penrith in the County of Cumbria, and he was introduced in the House of Lords on 10 March 2011, where he sits as a Conservative. In 2010, Maclean was played by Sam Graham, in the television film On Expenses. Four years later he was found to have breached the Code of Conduct of the Lords in his dealings with the government of the Cayman Islands.

Lord Blencathra returned to the frontbenches for the first time in 19 years on 1 September 2024 as Shadow Minister for Environment, Food and Rural Affairs.

== Personal life ==
In 2003, at the age of 49, Maclean revealed he had been living with multiple sclerosis for the previous five years.

== See also ==
- 1983 Penrith and The Border by-election
- Official Opposition Shadow Cabinet (United Kingdom)

Parliament of the United Kingdom
Preceded by William Whitelaw	Member of Parliament for Penrith and The Border; 1983–2010	Succeeded by Rory Stewart
Political offices
Preceded by Michael Jack	Minister of State for Home Affairs; 1993–1997	Succeeded by Alun Michael
Preceded by James Arbuthnot	Opposition Chief Whip of the House of Commons; 2001–2005	Succeeded by Patrick McLoughlin
Party political offices
Preceded by James Arbuthnot	Conservative Chief Whip of the House of Commons; 2001–2005	Succeeded by Patrick McLoughlin
Orders of precedence in the United Kingdom
Preceded by The Lord Glasman	Gentlemen; Baron Blencathra	Followed by The Lord Singh of Wimbledon
