= 1983 Penrith and The Border by-election =

UK by-election

- 28 July 1983

Constituency of Penrith and The Border
- Turnout: 55.9% (▼17.2%)
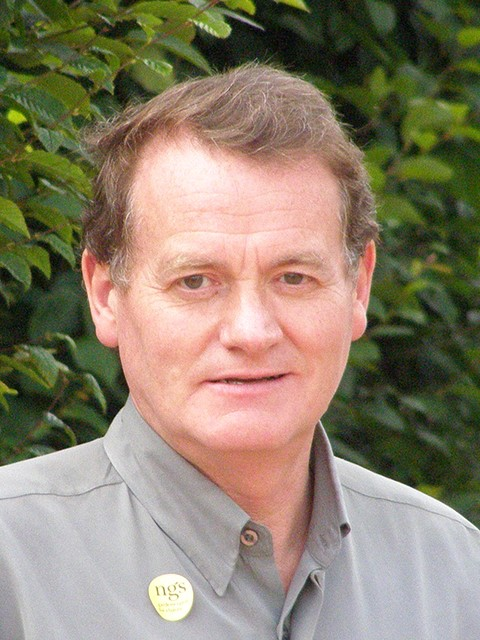
	First party	Second party	Third party
Candidate	David Maclean	Michael Young	Lindsay Williams
Party	Conservative	Liberal	Labour
Popular vote	17,530	16,978	2,834
Percentage	46.0%	44.6%	7.4%
Swing	▼12.8%	▲16.7%	▼5.8
MP before election
William Whitelaw
Conservative
Subsequent MP
David Maclean
Conservative

The 1983 Penrith and The Border by-election was a parliamentary by-election held on 28 July 1983 for the House of Commons constituency of Penrith and The Border in Cumbria.

Held seven weeks after the election in which the Conservatives won a second term by a landslide, it was the very first by-election of the 1983–1987 Parliament.

== Vacancy ==
The seat had become vacant when the constituency's Conservative Member of Parliament (MP), William Whitelaw had been elevated to the peerage as Viscount Whitelaw. Whitelaw had held the seat since the 1955 general election, and had been Deputy Leader of the Conservative Party since 1974, and Deputy Prime Minister since 1979, serving as Home Secretary from 1979 until his ennoblement and appointment as Leader of the House of Lords.

== Result ==
The result of the contest was a narrow victory for the Conservative candidate, David Maclean, who won with a majority of 552 over the SDP–Liberal Alliance candidate Michael Young.

Defeated candidate Eric Morgan brought an election petition challenging the result on several grounds, all of which were rejected by the trial judge:

- illegal election expenses and false declaration of election expenses (relating to spending on committee rooms) — no evidence to support
- false statement of fact (a list of candidates published in The Daily Telegraph omitted Morgan) — unfortunate but not significant
- undue influence by Viscount Whitelaw — the judge called the claim "an enormous impertinence"

== Votes ==
Penrith and The Border by-election, 28 July 1983
Party	Candidate	Votes	%	±%
Conservative	David Maclean	17,530	46.0	−12.8
Liberal	Michael Young	16,978	44.6	+16.7
Labour	Lindsay Williams	2,834	7.4	−5.8
Monster Raving Loony	Screaming Lord Sutch	412	1.1	New
Retired Naval Officer	Eric Morgan	150	0.4	New
Death off Roads: Freight on Rail	Helen Anscomb	72	0.2	New
Independent Socialist	John Connell	69	0.2	New
New Britain	Peter Smith	35	0.1	New
Majority		552	1.4	−29.5
Turnout		38,080	55.9	−17.2
Conservative hold		Swing	-14.8	

General election, 1983: Penrith and The Border
Party	Candidate	Votes	%	±%
Conservative	William Whitelaw	29,304	58.8	−2.4
Alliance	Michael Young	13,883	27.9	+11.4
Labour	W Williams	6,612	13.3	−9.1
Majority		15,421	30.1	−8.7
Turnout		49,799	73.1	−3.9
Conservative hold		Swing		

== See also ==
- Penrith and The Border (UK Parliament constituency)
- Penrith
- Lists of United Kingdom by-elections
