= University of York Conservative and Unionist Association =

University political society

University of York Conservative Association
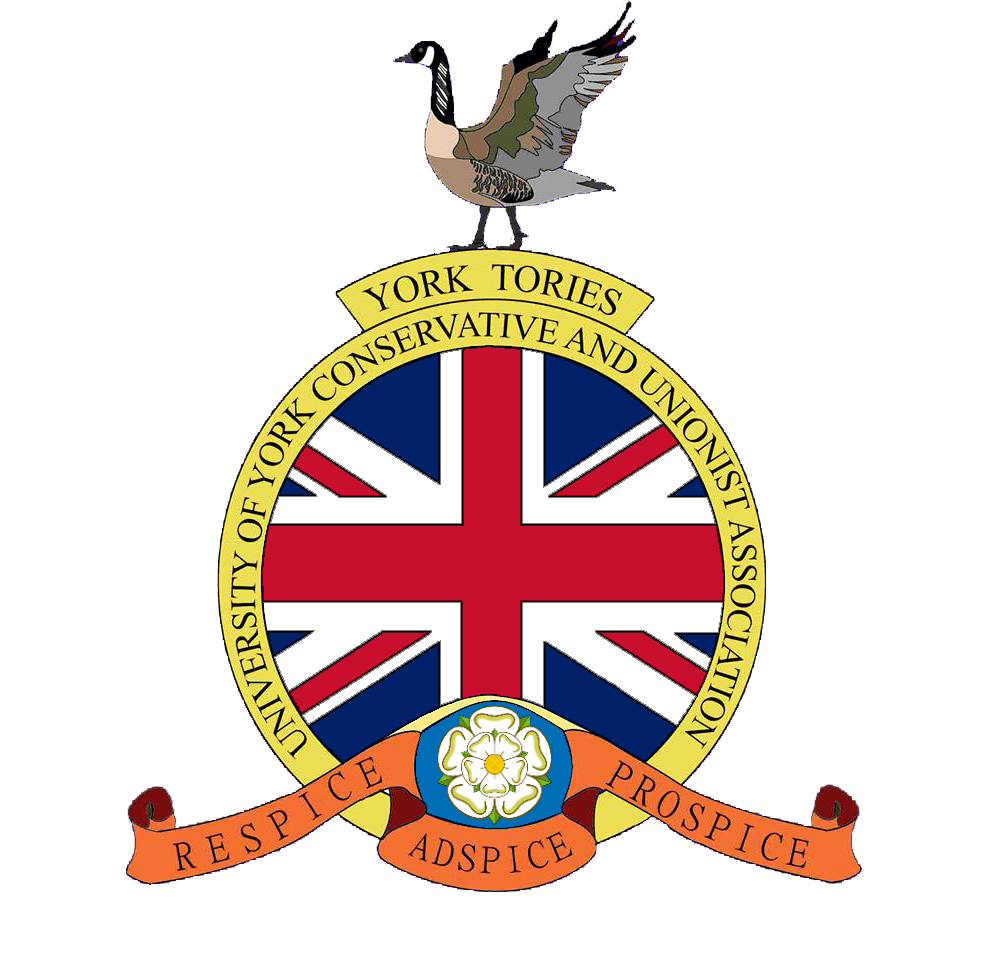
- Arms of the association
- Abbreviation: UYCA
- Nickname: York Tories
- Formation: Michaelmas 1963
- Type: University political society
- Headquarters: Derwent College
- Location: University of York
- Chairman: John Resco
- Treasurer: Max Geddie
- Secretary: Ella Roussel
- Formerly called: University of York Conservative Association

The University of York Conservative Association, known more commonly as the York Tories, is a student Conservative association founded in 1963 and based at the University of York. While it is independent from the national Conservative Party, it is affiliated and does share some events. It is affiliated with the University of York Students' Union.

== Events ==
The association hosts a variety of events, some of a political nature, for members to attend, with events being held on the Wednesday and Friday during the term. Traditionally, events have not been held during the exam period of the summer term, but more relaxed events have been held anyway.

The Wednesday events are the social events, and tend to be pub crawls, chase pub crawls, as well as the termly Port & Policy and Pint & Policy. The Friday events tend to be calmer, and sometimes intellectual. These events can be movie nights, debates, quizzes, board games, speakers, and dinners. Sometimes these events end at the curry house 'The Garden of India', which has developed a close relationship with the association.

Port & Policy is the most popular of the associations events. Unlike some conservative associations who charge for attendance, membership of the association merits free port. Recordings of any variety is strictly forbidden, which allows serious debate to occur without fear of retribution. Motions are collected by the secretary, then proposed and considered throughout the evening, and then individually voted on. Member vote for, against, or abstain. The evening concludes with all motions that passed being repeated to the members, which are then voted on to decide which is the most popular.

The association has a close relationship with Northern University Conservative associations, namely the Durham University Conservative and Unionist Association, the Newcastle Conservative Society, and Northumbria University Conservative Society. This is epitomised in the annual Primrose Dinner, hosted by the Newcastle Conservative Society in The Northern Counties Private Members Club.

== History ==
The University of York Conservative and Unionist Association was founded in 1963.

Under the chairmanship of Harvey Proctor, the association hosted Enoch Powell twice, with both occasions requiring a large police operation to protect the event from protesters over the Rivers of Blood speech. The association also became involved with the 'pirate' radio station Radio 270, making political broadcasts and interviewing politicians.

In 1996 the association's website was hacked to include explicit images and fictional accounts of meetings, as well as verbally attacking the Conservative Party. The Conservative Central Party launched an investigation to establish how these changes occurred.

In 2013 the Fox Hunt chase pub crawl had to be abandoned due to backlash against the theme and fears for members' safety. The annual event saw men encouraged to dress as hunters and women to dress as foxes, with the hunters hunting the foxes across various York bars, but was accused of being sexist and ignoring animal rights. The University of York Vegetarian and Vegan Society (VegSoc) encouraged members to turn up to the event to protest against it and to bring red paint. The association was concerned that members would be assaulted with this red paint, as well as with deodorant, food dye and chloroform. Members of the association's committee also rejected the accusation of sexism on the basis that the dress code was voluntary, and in previous events a majority of attendees were women. Threats were also made by members of the University of York Feminists (FemSoc). The chairman of VegSoc rejected the idea that individuals' views reflect those of VegSoc or FemSoc, but ultimately supported the cancellation of the event. Ultimately the social was planned to go ahead following discussions between YUSU officers and members of the association which reached a compromise, but pressure from the national press forced the event to be cancelled. The event was revived in 2013 under the new Events Officer, with the new format of members chasing committee.

In 2014, the Hagueathon was criticised out of concern that it encouraged binge drinking. The association rejected these accusations and continued to hold the termly event.

In 2017, controversy arose when the association invite the Conservative MP Philip Davies to give a talk. Opposition centred around past statements of his being labelled as misogynistic. In response to backlash on social media, the association stated "We are pleased to further the cause of two of the cornerstones of our nation: freedom of speech and freedom of expression". Some students reported that they would take the opportunity provided by this event to challenge Davies on his views.

Robert Ward, the chairman in 2018, signed a letter in The Daily Telegraph to the then prime minister, Theresa May, calling on her to stop pursuing the Chequers Plan.

In 2020, the Fox Hunt caused further controversy. On this occasion, the Conservative Party publicly condemned the event.

Plans to hold a dinner with Desmond Swayne in 2022 were halted after the YUSU BAME Network released a statement condemning the event. Concerns specifically focused on comments Desmond had made in support of black face, and had that could present a hostile environment to incoming BAME students.

== Organisation ==
The association is led by the committee, elected by an AGM at the end of the Winter Term. It manages all of the business and events, and broadly represents the association. The positions on the committee and their office-holders can be changed by constitutional amendments at EGMs. All committee members are required to be members of the association.

The association also elects an Honorary President, an Honorary Vice-President, and three Honorary Members for Life at its AGM. By convention, all former chairmen automatically become Honorary Member for life. The current Honorary President is Princess Anne and the Honorary Vice-President is Rory Stewart.

== Traditions ==
- The Hagueathon was founded by the association following a claim made by William Hague in 2000 that, as a teenager, he regularly consumed 14 pints of alcohol a night. York Tories attempt to honour his supposed achievement by consuming 14 pints within 12 hours, then sing the National Anthem from Clifford's Tower before midnight in order to complete the challenge. The Spectator reported that Hague has been given a certificate, recognising that he is the first Hagueathon winner.
- The Fox Hunt chase pub crawl is held annually, roughly replicating a fox hunt. One team, the foxes, are pursued by the hunters along a set route of pubs. The foxes are played by committee members, while non-committee are the hunters.

== Notable alumni ==
- Harvey Proctor, MP, UYCUA chairman
- Michael Brown, MP
- Christine Hamilton, media personality, UYCUA social secretary
- Michael Young, OBE, UYCUA chairman
- Paul Goodman, life peer
- Gawain Towler, political strategist, UYCUA chairman
- Michelle Donelan, MP
- Chloe Smith, MP
- Keane Duncan, councillor, UYCUA chairman
- Charlotte Owen, life peer
