= Michael Young (businessman) =

British businessman (1945–2023)

- Alma mater: University of York
- Occupation: Businessperson, politician, negotiator
- Awards: Officer of the Order of the British Empire

Michael Alan Young OBE (11 May 1945 – 9 November 2023) was a businessman with a political background. He secretly organised the meetings between the South African government and the leadership of the African National Congress (ANC). In 2001 he was appointed to the Order of the British Empire for his contribution to human rights.

== Career ==
While at the University of York, Young was chairman of the University of York Conservative and Unionist Association. After graduating from the university in PPE in 1972, Young started his career in 10 Downing Street, the Prime Minister's office and in the Foreign Office when Edward Heath was Prime Minister. He moved to ARC Ltd and then to its parent Consolidated Gold Fields as Public Affairs Manager where he worked under the Chairman Rudolph Agnew. It was under Agnew that Young organised secret meetings at Mells Park House, a building designed by Edwin Lutyens in Somerset. The meetings were attended by various delegates from the South African government as well as leaders of the ANC such as Thabo Mbeki and Oliver Tambo. The meetings contributed to the end of South Africa's apartheid regime. In 1994 Young was invited by Nelson Mandela to his inauguration as President of South Africa.

Young later joined the Liberal Party, standing as the party's candidate for Penrith and The Border at the 1983 General Election, where he came second, and in the same seat in a by-election seven weeks later, when he came within 552 votes of gaining the seat from the Conservatives. He also stood as the Liberal candidate in the 1987 General Election for the Isle of Wight, again coming second.

In 2001 Young was awarded an OBE "for services to international human rights".

In 2009 Michael Young was the subject of a Film called Endgame produced by Channel 4, a national Television Network in the United Kingdom.

Young's death aged 78 was recorded in The Times on 16 November 2023 as having occurred on 9 November 2023, and his death was confirmed in the entry for him in the catalogue of the Borthwick Institute for Archives at the University of York, which holds his papers.

== See also ==
- Endgame (2009 film)

== Publications ==
- Robert Harvey, The Fall of Apartheid, Houndmills, Basingstoke, Hampshire; New York : Palgrave, 2001. ISBN 978-0333802472
