= Centre for Welsh Studies =

Pro-Brexit Welsh think-tank based in Cardiff

The Centre for Welsh Studies is a pro-Brexit Welsh think-tank, which advocates "a positive vision for Wales outside the European Union". The group is based in Cardiff.

== Board of Advisors ==
The advisory board is made up of Conservative and Independent political figures. Conservative Members of Parliament on the board include: David Jones, deputy chairman of the European Research Group; James Davies and Sarah Atherton. Patrick Minford, professor at Cardiff University, is also on the board.

== Organisation ==
Its Director and COO are Matthew MacKinnon and Edward Sumner.

MacKinnon studied politics and business at university and became a Eurosceptic there, later going on to work in the European Parliament. He used to be Vote Leave's regional director for Wales, and said that is "greatest hope is for the global Britain brand".

Sumner studied politics at the University of Hull and University of Bremen. He has worked for the European Parliament and has written for such outlets like the Huffington Post and the Telegraph before joining the Centre for Welsh Studies as COO. Sumner was a Brexit supporter and worked on the Vote Leave campaign.

== Funding ==
The group has been described by Wired as "notoriously cagey about its finances". It is a partner of, and has "received several thousand pounds" from, Atlas Network (a funder of right-libertarian and free-market groups). Despite apparently owing more to its creditors than it received in income in the year ending January 31, 2020 (£1,164 in assets, compared to the £1,208 owed to creditors), the organisation has the wherewithal to upgrade its offices and launch hundreds of pounds' worth of Facebook advertisements.

== Lockdown criticism ==
The group has been critical of the Welsh government's response to the COVID-19 pandemic, with MacKinnon arguing that the government response was made under pressure and has led to great economic damage. Welsh Conservative politician Jonathan Morgan has written a piece for the Centre's website regarding the "new normal" as a result of the pandemic.
