= Penrith and The Border =

Parliamentary constituency in the United Kingdom, 1950–2024

Coordinates: 54.7°N 2.7°W

- Former county constituency for the House of Commons
- Boundary of Penrith and The Border in Cumbria

- Location of Cumbria within England
- County: Cumbria
- Electorate: 67,555 (December 2019)
- Major settlements: Appleby-in-Westmorland, Brampton, Penrith, and Wigton

1950–2024
- Seats: One
- Created from: Penrith & Cockermouth and North Cumberland
- Replaced by: Penrith and Solway, Carlisle, Westmorland and Lonsdale

Penrith and The Border was a constituency (Note: A county constituency (for the purposes of election expenses and type of returning officer)) in Cumbria represented in the House of Commons of the UK Parliament. Throughout its existence, it elected only members of the Conservative Party. (Note: As with all constituencies, the constituency elects one Member of Parliament (MP) by the first past the post system of election at least every five years.)

Established for the 1950 general election, the seat was abolished prior to the 2024 general election, with its area being split between three other constituencies.

== History ==
Penrith and The Border was first contested in 1950, since which it was generally a safe Conservative seat and on rare occasions a marginal. The Conservatives came close to losing the seat in a 1983 by-election, when the former cabinet minister William Whitelaw became the leader of the House of Lords: the by-election took place a mere seven weeks after his success in the 1983 general election. Since that year, the Liberal Democrats had come second behind the Conservatives until the 2015 general election when they came fourth. At the two subsequent general elections, they came third.

=== History of boundaries ===
Map of boundaries 2010–2024

1950–1983: The Urban District of Penrith, and the Rural Districts of Alston with Garrigill, Border, Penrith, and Wigton.

1983–1997: The District of Eden wards of Alston Moor, Appleby, Appleby Bongate, Askham, Brough, Crosby Ravensworth, Dacre, Eamont, Greystoke, Hartside, Hesket, Kirkby Thore, Kirkoswald, Langwathby, Lazonby, Long Marton, Lowther, Penrith East, Penrith North, Penrith South, Penrith West, Skelton, Ullswater, and Warcop, the City of Carlisle wards of Arthuret, Brampton, Burgh, Dalston, Great Corby and Geltsdale, Hayton, Irthing, Lyne, St Cuthbert Without, Stanwix Rural, and Wetheral, and the District of Allerdale wards of Aspatria, Boltons, Marsh, Silloth, Tarns, Wampool, Warnell, Waver, and Wigton.

1997–2010: The District of Eden, the City of Carlisle wards of Arthuret, Brampton, Great Corby and Geltsdale, Hayton, Irthing, Lyne, Stanwix Rural, and Wetheral, and the District of Allerdale wards of Marsh, Wampool, Warnell, and Wigton.

2010–2024: The District of Eden, the City of Carlisle wards of Brampton, Great Corby and Geltsdale, Hayton, Irthing, Longtown and Rockcliffe, Lyne, and Stanwix Rural, and the District of Allerdale wards of Warnell and Wigton.

The constituency was created in 1950 by merging part of Penrith and Cockermouth with North Cumberland. It was redrawn in 1983 by taking in most of the northern part of the old Westmorland constituency and in 1997 by taking in the Kirkby Stephen and Tebay areas of the pre-1997 Westmorland and Lonsdale constituency by doing so the constituency covered the entire district of Eden. Penrith and The Border also included parts of Allerdale and Carlisle districts, but lost parts of these areas to other seats at each boundary review.

Penrith and The Border was the largest constituency by area in England until 2024. Despite the name, it only included the Cumbrian portion of the English border with Scotland. The Northumberland portion was covered by the constituencies of Hexham and Berwick-upon-Tweed. The name stems from the fact that when the constituency was first created it consisted of the Penrith Rural and Urban Districts, the Border Rural District and also the Alston with Garrigill Rural District.

== Abolition ==
Further to the completion of the 2023 periodic review of Westminster constituencies, the seat was abolished for the 2024 general election, with its contents distributed to three neighbouring constituencies:

- Penrith and rural areas stretching from Alston in the east to Wigton in the west to the new seat of Penrith and Solway
- The parts in the (former) City of Carlisle district ("The Border"), including Brampton and Longtown, to the constituency of Carlisle
- Areas to the south of Penrith, including Appleby-in-Westmorland and Kirkby Stephen, to Westmorland and Lonsdale

== Constituency profile ==
A heavily undulating, mostly farmed terrain dotted by market towns and historic villages, with wooded mountainsides and heath-covered tops, the constituency was focused on the Eden Valley between the Pennines and the Lake District, with the vale of the River Irthing above Carlisle. In the north towards Scotland were 8 of its 42 wards all beside or in the market town of Brampton which sits beside Hadrian's Wall.

The constituency tended to have modest incomes, low unemployment and a rate of dependency on social housing lower than urban centres.

== Members of Parliament ==
The seat was represented for nearly three decades by William Whitelaw, who served as a cabinet minister in various capacities during Conservative governments of the 1970s and 1980s and later joined the House of Lords.

His successor, the former Conservative Chief Whip and junior minister, David Maclean, sat as MP from 1983 to 2010, when he stood down due to the state of his health; he was diagnosed with multiple sclerosis in 1996.

Maclean was succeeded by Rory Stewart in May 2010. In September 2019 Rory Stewart had the Conservative whip withdrawn and therefore sat as an independent MP.

At the December 2019 general election, Neil Hudson of the Conservative Party became the new MP.

Election	Member	Party
1950	Donald Scott	Conservative
1955	William Whitelaw	Conservative
1983 by-election	David Maclean	Conservative
2010	Rory Stewart	Conservative
September 2019	Rory Stewart	Independent
2019	Neil Hudson	Conservative

== Elections ==
=== Elections in the 2010s ===
General election 2019: Penrith and The Border
Party	Candidate	Votes	%	±%
Conservative	Neil Hudson	28,875	60.4	±0.0
Labour Co-op	Sarah Williams	10,356	21.7	−4.5
Liberal Democrats	Matthew Severn	5,364	11.2	+3.4
Green	Ali Ross	2,159	4.5	+2.3
CumbriaFirst	Jonathan Davies	1,070	2.2	New
Majority		18,519	38.7	+4.5
Turnout		47,824	71.7	+0.7
Conservative hold		Swing	+2.2	

General election 2017: Penrith and The Border
Party	Candidate	Votes	%	±%
Conservative	Rory Stewart	28,078	60.4	+0.7
Labour	Lola McEvoy	12,168	26.2	+11.8
Liberal Democrats	Neil Hughes	3,641	7.8	−0.7
UKIP	Kerryanne Wilde	1,142	2.5	−9.7
Green	Doug Lawson	1,029	2.2	−3.1
Independent	Jonathan Davies	412	0.9	New
Majority		15,910	34.2	−11.1
Turnout		46,470	71.0	+3.6
Conservative hold		Swing	−5.5	

General election 2015: Penrith and The Border
Party	Candidate	Votes	%	±%
Conservative	Rory Stewart	26,202	59.7	+6.3
Labour	Lee Rushworth	6,308	14.4	+1.5
UKIP	John Stanyer	5,353	12.2	+9.4
Liberal Democrats	Neil Hughes	3,745	8.5	−20.0
Green	George Burrow	2,313	5.3	New
Majority		19,894	45.3	+20.4
Turnout		43,921	67.4	−2.5
Conservative hold		Swing		

General election 2010: Penrith and The Border
Party	Candidate	Votes	%	±%
Conservative	Rory Stewart	24,071	53.4	+2.0
Liberal Democrats	Peter Thornton	12,830	28.5	+2.6
Labour	Barbara Cannon	5,834	12.9	−6.1
UKIP	John Stanyer	1,259	2.8	+0.3
BNP	Chris Davidson	1,093	2.4	New
Majority		11,241	24.9	−0.6
Turnout		45,087	69.9	+3.8
Conservative hold		Swing	−0.3	

=== Elections in the 2000s ===
General election 2005: Penrith and The Border
Party	Candidate	Votes	%	±%
Conservative	David Maclean	24,046	51.3	−3.6
Liberal Democrats	Kenneth Walker	12,142	25.9	+4.1
Labour	Michael Boaden	8,958	19.1	+0.6
UKIP	William Robinson	1,187	2.5	+0.4
Legalise Cannabis	Mark Gibson	549	1.2	−0.8
Majority		11,904	25.4	−7.7
Turnout		46,882	66.1	+1.6
Conservative hold		Swing	−3.9	

General election 2001: Penrith and The Border
Party	Candidate	Votes	%	±%
Conservative	David Maclean	24,302	54.9	+7.3
Liberal Democrats	Kenneth Walker	9,625	21.8	−4.9
Labour	Michael Boaden	8,177	18.5	−3.1
UKIP	Thomas Lowther	938	2.1	New
Legalise Cannabis	Mark Gibson	870	2.0	New
Independent	John Moffat	337	0.8	New
Majority		14,677	33.1	+12.2
Turnout		44,249	64.5	−9.1
Conservative hold		Swing	+6.1	

=== Elections in the 1990s ===
General election 1997: Penrith and The Border
Party	Candidate	Votes	%	±%
Conservative	David Maclean	23,300	47.6	−11.1
Liberal Democrats	Kenneth Walker	13,067	26.7	−2.3
Labour	Margaret Meling	10,576	21.6	+10.6
Referendum	Charles Pope	2,018	4.1	New
Majority		10,233	20.9	−8.8
Turnout		48,961	73.6	−3.9
Conservative hold		Swing	−4.4	

General election 1992: Penrith and The Border
Party	Candidate	Votes	%	±%
Conservative	David Maclean	33,808	57.5	−2.8
Liberal Democrats	Kenneth Walker	15,359	26.1	−2.6
Labour	John Metcalfe	8,871	15.1	+4.1
Green	Robert A. Gibson	610	1.0	New
Natural Law	Ian Docker	129	0.2	New
Majority		18,449	31.4	−0.2
Turnout		58,777	79.7	+2.2
Conservative hold		Swing	−0.1	

=== Elections in the 1980s ===
General election 1987: Penrith and The Border
Party	Candidate	Votes	%	±%
Conservative	David Maclean	33,148	60.3	+1.5
Liberal	David Ivison	15,782	28.7	+0.8
Labour	John Hutton	6,075	11.0	−2.3
Majority		17,366	31.6	+1.5
Turnout		55,005	77.5	+4.4
Conservative hold		Swing	+0.8	

By-election 1983: Penrith and The Border
Party	Candidate	Votes	%	±%
Conservative	David Maclean	17,530	46.0	−12.8
Liberal	Michael Young	16,978	44.6	+16.7
Labour	Lindsay Williams	2,834	7.4	−5.9
Monster Raving Loony	Screaming Lord Sutch	412	1.1	New
Retired Naval Officer	Eric Morgan	150	0.4	New
Death off Roads: Freight on Rail	Helen Anscomb	72	0.2	New
Independent Socialist	John Connell	69	0.2	New
New Britain	Peter Smith	35	0.1	New
Majority		552	1.4	−28.5
Turnout		38,080	55.9	−17.2
Conservative hold		Swing	−14.8	

General election 1983: Penrith and The Border
Party	Candidate	Votes	%	±%
Conservative	William Whitelaw	29,304	58.8	−2.4
Liberal	Michael Young	13,883	27.9	+11.4
Labour	Lindsay Williams	6,612	13.3	−9.1
Majority		15,421	30.9	−8.9
Turnout		49,799	73.1	−3.9
Conservative hold		Swing		

=== Elections in the 1970s ===
General election 1979: Penrith and The Border
Party	Candidate	Votes	%	±%
Conservative	William Whitelaw	26,940	61.2	
Labour	L.R. West	9,844	22.4	
Liberal	B. Wates	7,257	16.5	
Majority		17,096	38.8	
Turnout		44,041	77.0	
Conservative hold		Swing		

General election October 1974: Penrith and The Border
Party	Candidate	Votes	%	±%
Conservative	William Whitelaw	23,547	58.06	
Labour	Joseph Norman David Weedall	9,791	24.14	
Liberal	Joseph Pease	7,215	17.79	
Majority		13,756	33.92	
Turnout		40,553	72.93	
Conservative hold		Swing		

General election February 1974: Penrith and The Border
Party	Candidate	Votes	%	±%
Conservative	William Whitelaw	26,433	60.12	
Labour	Joseph Norman David Weedall	9,095	20.69	
Liberal	Peter Alexander	8,202	18.66	
Independent	William Hesmondalgh	235	0.53	New
Majority		17,338	39.43	
Turnout		43,965	79.79	
Conservative hold		Swing		

General election 1970: Penrith and The Border
Party	Candidate	Votes	%	±%
Conservative	William Whitelaw	23,800	58.95	
Labour	R. Longworth	10,256	25.40	
Liberal	William Jackson	6,316	15.64	
Majority		13,544	33.55	
Turnout		40,372	74.39	
Conservative hold		Swing		

=== Elections in the 1960s ===
General election 1966: Penrith and The Border
Party	Candidate	Votes	%	±%
Conservative	William Whitelaw	20,982	52.69	
Labour	Kate M.A. Roberts	12,081	30.34	
Liberal	John R. Howe	6,757	16.97	
Majority		8,901	22.35	
Turnout		39,820	78.66	
Conservative hold		Swing		

General election 1964: Penrith and The Border
Party	Candidate	Votes	%	±%
Conservative	William Whitelaw	21,288	51.78	
Labour	Kate M.A. Roberts	10,490	25.59	
Liberal	William Jackson	9,279	22.63	
Majority		10,738	26.19	
Turnout		41,057	80.64	
Conservative hold		Swing		

=== Elections in the 1950s ===
General election 1959: Penrith and The Border
Party	Candidate	Votes	%	±%
Conservative	William Whitelaw	23,551	58.2	+0.7
Labour	Bernard P. Atha	9,342	23.1	+0.1
Liberal	Brian G. Ashmore	7,602	18.8	+0.3
Majority		14,209	35.1	+0.6
Turnout		40,495	79.1	+1.2
Conservative hold		Swing		

General election 1955: Penrith and The Border
Party	Candidate	Votes	%	±%
Conservative	William Whitelaw	22,791	57.52	
Labour Co-op	Thomas L MacDonald	9,119	23.02	
Liberal	Frederick James Sleath	7,342	18.53	
Ind. Conservative	William Brownrigg	368	0.93	
Majority		13,672	34.50	
Turnout		39,620	77.88	
Conservative hold		Swing		

General election 1951: Penrith and The Border
Party	Candidate	Votes	%	±%
Conservative	Donald Scott	23,274	54.07	
Labour	John Rafferty	10,759	24.99	
Liberal	Stafford Vaughan Stepney Howard	8,857	20.57	
Ind. Conservative	William Brownrigg	158	0.37	New
Majority		12,515	29.08	
Turnout		43,048	83.47	
Conservative hold		Swing		

General election 1950: Penrith and The Border
Party	Candidate	Votes	%	±%
Conservative	Donald Scott	21,214	48.23	
Liberal	Wilfrid Roberts	12,333	28.04	
Labour	C.J. Taylor	10,441	23.74	
Majority		8,881	20.19	
Turnout		43,988	85.26	
Conservative win (new seat)				

== See also ==
- 1983 Penrith and The Border by-election
- List of parliamentary constituencies in Cumbria
