= William Hurt =

American actor (1950–2022)

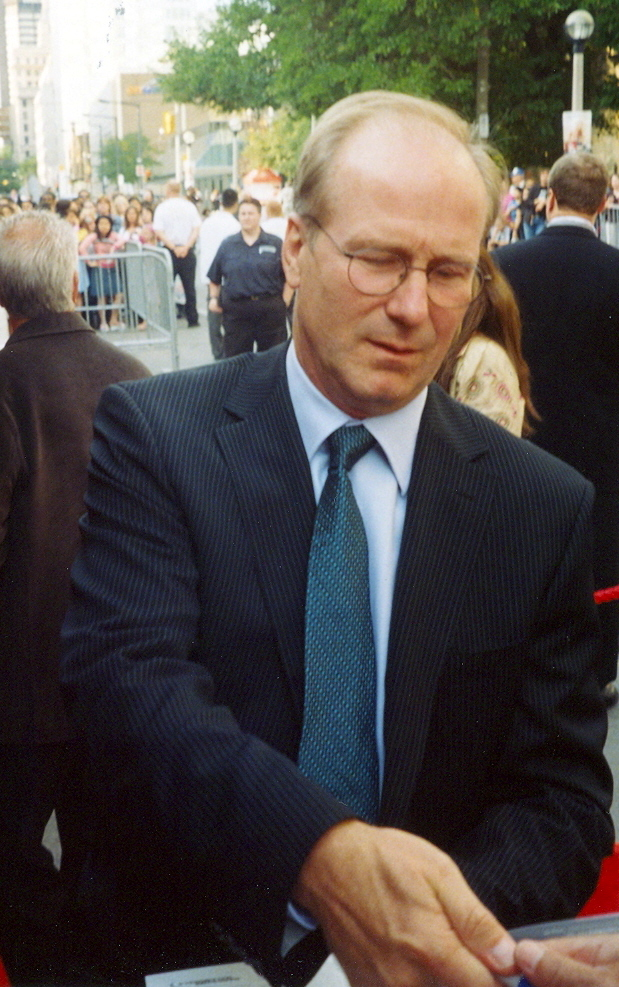
- Hurt at the premiere for A History of Violence, 2005
- Born: William McChord Hurt; March 20, 1950; Washington, D.C., U.S.
- Died: March 13, 2022 (aged 71); Portland, Oregon, U.S.
- Education: Tufts University (BA); Juilliard School (GrDip)
- Occupation: Actor
- Years active: 1975–2022
- Spouses: Mary Beth Supinger (m. 1971; div. 1982) Heidi Henderson (m. 1989; div. 1993)
- Children: 4

William McChord Hurt (March 20, 1950 – March 13, 2022) was an American actor. Known for his performances on stage and screen, he received various accolades including an Academy Award, a BAFTA Award, and a Cannes Film Festival Award for Best Actor, in addition to nominations for five Golden Globe Awards, two Primetime Emmy Awards, and a Tony Award.

Hurt studied at the Juilliard School before his film debut, in Ken Russell's science-fiction feature Altered States (1980), for which he received a nomination for the Golden Globe Award for New Star of the Year. He went on to receive the Academy Award for Best Actor playing a gay prisoner in Kiss of the Spider Woman (1985). Hurt was also Oscar-nominated for Children of a Lesser God (1986), Broadcast News (1987), and A History of Violence (2005). He starred in films such as Body Heat (1981), The Big Chill (1983), The Accidental Tourist (1988), Alice (1990), One True Thing (1998), Syriana (2005), Mr. Brooks (2007), Into the Wild (2007), and The Yellow Handkerchief (2008). Hurt also portrayed Thaddeus Ross in five of the Marvel Cinematic Universe (MCU) films starting with The Incredible Hulk (2008) and concluding with Black Widow (2021).

On television, Hurt received Primetime Emmy Award nominations for Outstanding Supporting Actor in a Drama Series playing a scientist in the FX legal drama Damages (2009) and for Outstanding Lead Actor in a Limited Series or Movie for his portrayal of Henry Paulson in the HBO movie Too Big to Fail (2011). He later acted in the legal drama series Goliath (2016–2021) and the thriller series Condor (2018–2020).

On stage, Hurt appeared in off-Broadway productions of William Shakespeare's Henry V (1975), and A Midsummer Night's Dream (1982) as well as Lanford Wilson's Fifth of July (1978). He made his Broadway debut in David Rabe's dark comedy Hurlyburly (1984) playing a Hollywood casting director, for which he was nominated for the Tony Award for Best Featured Actor in a Play.

== Early life and education ==
Hurt was born on March 20, 1950, in Washington, D.C., to Claire Isabel (née McGill; 1923–1971), who worked for Time Inc., and Alfred McChord Hurt (1910–1996), who worked for the United States Agency for International Development and the State Department. He had two brothers. With his father, he lived in Lahore, Mogadishu, and Khartoum. His parents divorced and, in 1960, his mother married Henry Luce III (1925–2005), a son of publisher Henry Luce.

Hurt attended the Middlesex School in Concord, Massachusetts, where he was vice-president of the Dramatics Club and had the lead role in several school plays. He graduated in 1968 and his yearbook predicted, "you might even see him on Broadway." Hurt attended Tufts University and studied theology, graduating with a BA magna cum laude in 1972, but turned instead to acting and joined the Juilliard School (Drama Division Group 5: 1972–1976).

== Career ==
=== 1977–1989: Early roles and stardom ===
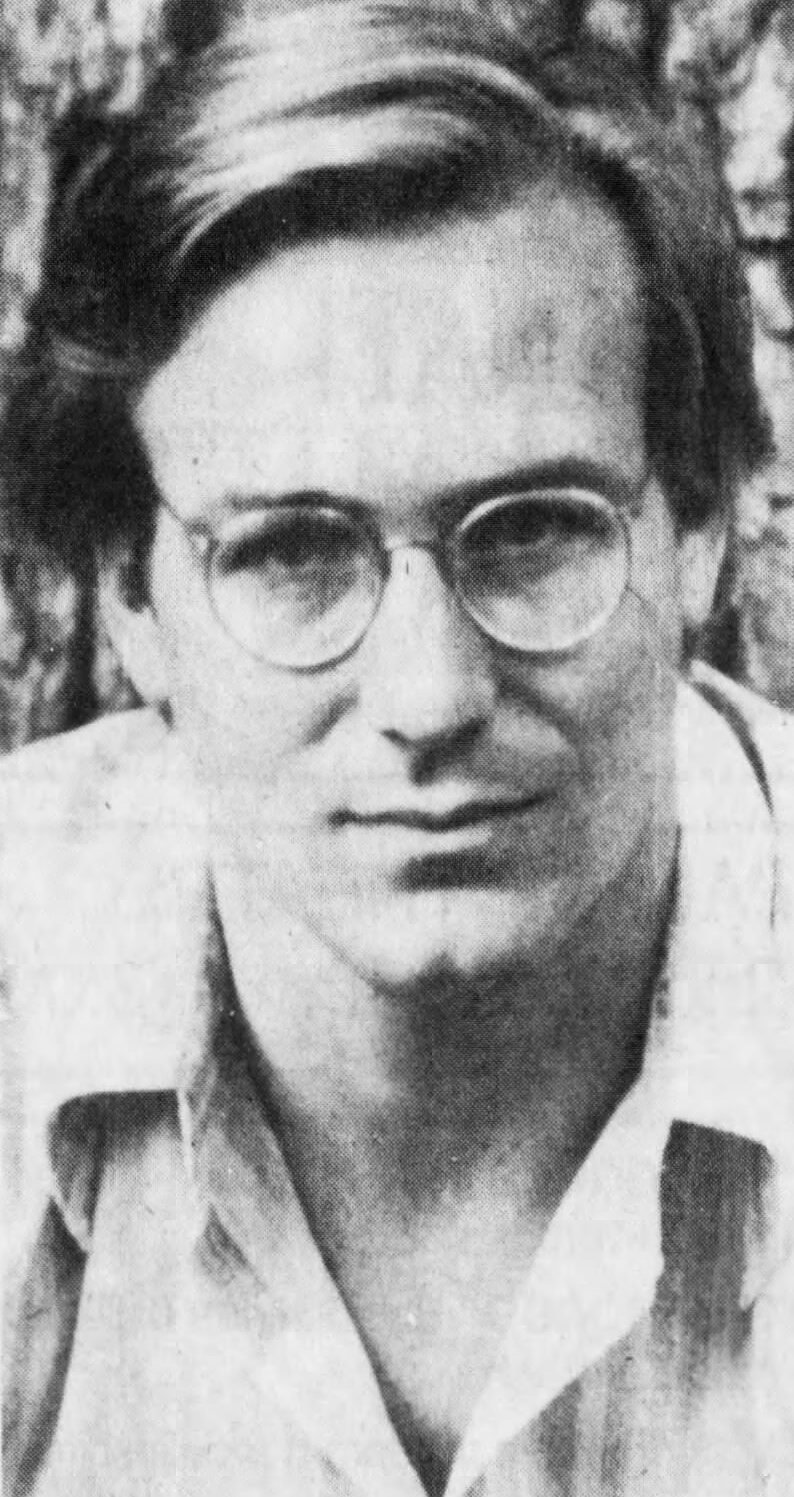
Hurt in 1981

Hurt began his career in stage productions. He was in off-Broadway productions of William Shakespeare's Henry V (1975), and A Midsummer Night's Dream (1982). From 1977 to 1989, he was a member of the acting company at Circle Repertory Company. He won an Obie Award for his debut appearance there in Corinne Jacker's My Life, and won a 1978 Theatre World Award for his performances in Fifth of July, Ulysses in Traction, and Lulu. In 1979, Hurt played Hamlet under the direction of Marshall W. Mason opposite Lindsay Crouse and Beatrice Straight. He made his Broadway debut in David Rabe's dark comedy Hurlyburly (1984). His first major film role was in the science-fiction film Altered States (1980), where his performance as an obsessed scientist gained him wide recognition. His performance opposite newcomer Kathleen Turner in Lawrence Kasdan's neo-noir film Body Heat (1981) elevated Hurt to stardom. Kasdan and he became frequent collaborators: Hurt co-starred in Kasdan's acclaimed comedy-dramas The Big Chill (1983) and The Accidental Tourist (1988), both of which were nominated for the Academy Award for Best Picture, and he later had a supporting role in the ensemble comedy I Love You to Death (1990). In 1983 he appeared in the thriller Gorky Park (1983) opposite Lee Marvin.

In the 1980s, Hurt received three consecutive Academy Award nominations for Best Actor, beginning with an Oscar win for his turn as a prisoner in Hector Babenco's drama Kiss of the Spider Woman in 1985. He also received the Best Male Performance Prize at the Cannes Film Festival for this role. The New York Times wrote, "Mr. Hurt won a well-deserved best actor award at the Cannes Film Festival for a performance that is crafty at first, carefully nurtured and finally stirring in profound, unanticipated ways... What starts out as a campy, facetious catalog of Hollywood trivia becomes an extraordinarily moving film about manhood, heroism and love."

Hurt subsequently received Best Actor Oscar nominations for playing a speech teacher at a school for the deaf who falls for a deaf custodian in Children of a Lesser God (1986) and for playing a dim-witted television news anchor in Broadcast News the following year. Broadcast News, a romantic comedy directed by James L. Brooks, would come to be Hurt's most acclaimed film, with an inclusion to the National Film Registry in the Library of Congress in 2018.

=== 1990–2007: Career fluctuations ===
Hurt began to appear more frequently in supporting roles. Some of his notable roles include performances in Alice (1990), One True Thing (1998), Dark City (1998), Lost in Space (1998), Sunshine (1999), A.I. Artificial Intelligence (2001), Tuck Everlasting (2002), The Village (2004), A History of Violence (2005), and Syriana (2005). Hurt's fourth career Oscar nomination, for Best Supporting Actor, would come in 2006 for playing a powerful crime boss in A History of Violence (2005), though his role comprised less than 10 minutes of screen time.

Other later film roles included Into the Wild (2007) and Mr. Brooks (2007). Hurt had several roles in television and theater. Hurt starred in the Sci Fi Channel miniseries adaptation Frank Herbert's Dune in 2000, playing Duke Leto Atreides; it was one of Syfy's highest-rated series ever. He was in the miniseries adaptation of Stephen King's Nightmares and Dreamscapes, in a piece titled Battleground (known for its complete lack of dialogue). He appeared in the cast of Vanya, an adaptation of Anton Chekhov's Uncle Vanya, at the Artists Repertory Theatre in Portland, Oregon.

=== 2008–2021: MCU films and television work ===
In June 2007, Marvel Studios announced that Hurt would portray General Thaddeus Ross in the 2008 film The Incredible Hulk alongside Edward Norton, Liv Tyler, and Tim Roth. Hurt reprised his role in four additional Marvel Cinematic Universe (MCU) films: Captain America: Civil War (2016), Avengers: Infinity War (2018), Avengers: Endgame (2019), and Black Widow (2021). Harrison Ford would then take over the role of Ross after Hurt's death in Captain America: Brave New World (2025). Hurt acted in Vantage Point and The Yellow Handkerchief (both 2008), and Robin Hood (2010).

In 2009, Hurt became a series regular on the FX series Damages playing a corporate whistleblower opposite Glenn Close and Marcia Gay Harden. For his role in the series, he earned a 2009 Primetime Emmy Award nomination for Supporting Actor in a Drama Series. In September 2010, Hurt played United States Secretary of the Treasury Henry Paulson in the HBO film Too Big to Fail, an adaptation of Andrew Ross Sorkin's book. He also starred as Captain Ahab in the 2011 television adaptation of Herman Melville's novel Moby-Dick. Hurt was set to play Gregg Allman in the film Midnight Rider, but he left the production after an on-set accident. His later television appearances included the legal drama series Goliath (2016–2021) and the thriller series Condor (2018–2020).

In 2018, Hurt was cast as the lead in The Coldest Game (2019), but after he was injured in an off-set accident, he was replaced by Bill Pullman. In one of his final roles, Hurt played opposite F. Murray Abraham in a standalone episode of Mythic Quest in 2021. Hurt had been set to appear in the series Pantheon and films The Fence, Men of Granite, and Edward Enderby before his death in March 2022, though he ultimately only appeared in Pantheon.

== Personal life ==
=== Marriages and relationships ===
Hurt was married to actress Mary Beth Hurt (née Supinger) from 1971 to 1982, and to Heidi Henderson from 1989 to 1993. Hurt had four children: one with Sandra Jennings; two with Henderson; and one with French actress, film director, and screenwriter Sandrine Bonnaire.

In 1981, while he was still married, Hurt and Sandra Jennings began a relationship in Saratoga Springs, New York. Jennings became pregnant in the spring of 1982, which was followed by Hurt's divorce from Mary Beth, after which Hurt and Jennings relocated to South Carolina, a state that recognized non-ceremonial common-law marriages. Hurt and Jennings never held a marriage ceremony and later separated.

Hurt was a private pilot and owner of a Beechcraft Bonanza. He was fluent in French and maintained a home outside Paris.

Hurt and Marlee Matlin had a relationship for two years, beginning when Matlin was 19 and Hurt was 35. The pair lived together for some time.

=== Domestic violence allegations ===
Hurt's girlfriend Sandra Jennings sued Hurt in New York, seeking recognition of their relationship as a common-law marriage under South Carolina law. The New York court held that the relationship between Hurt and Jennings did not qualify as a common-law marriage under South Carolina law and found in Hurt's favor that no marriage existed. During Jennings' lawsuit against Hurt, she alleged that Hurt subjected her to physical and verbal abuse. His spokesperson denied that Hurt ever beat Jennings.

In her 2009 autobiography I'll Scream Later, Marlee Matlin said that their relationship involved drug use and physical violence from Hurt, including a rape. In response to the accusations aired on CNN on April 13, 2009, Hurt's agent declined to respond, but Hurt issued a statement the following day that his "own recollection is that we both apologized and both did a great deal to heal our lives. Of course, I did and do apologize for any pain I caused. And I know we have both grown. I wish Marlee and her family nothing but good."

In a 2022 essay for Variety, after Hurt had died, author Donna Kaz wrote about dating Hurt in their twenties, from 1977 to 1980. She accused Hurt of domestic abuse in the article.

== Death and tributes ==
On March 13, 2022, Hurt died at the age of 71 at his Portland, Oregon, home from metastatic prostate cancer, with which he was diagnosed in May 2018.

Many actors paid tribute to Hurt, including Chris Evans, Robert Downey Jr., Gwyneth Paltrow, Tom Hanks, Rita Wilson, Dennis Quaid, Marg Helgenberger, Kevin Costner, Russell Crowe, John Goodman, Patton Oswalt, Albert Brooks, Bryce Dallas Howard, Maria Bello, Jonathan Frakes, Ben Stiller, Mark Ruffalo, Jennifer Garner, Jeremy Renner, and Topher Grace.

== Filmography ==
=== Film ===
Year	Title	Role	Notes	Ref(s)
1980	Altered States	Eddie Jessup		
1981	Eyewitness	Daryll Deever		
1981	Body Heat	Ned Racine		
1983	The Big Chill	Nick		
1983	Gorky Park	Arkady Renko		
1985	Kiss of the Spider Woman	Luis Molina		
1986	Children of a Lesser God	James		
1987	Broadcast News	Tom Grunick		
1988	A Time of Destiny	Martin Larraneta		
1988	The Accidental Tourist	Macon Leary		
1990	I Love You to Death	Harlan		
1990	Alice	Doug		
1991	The Doctor	Dr. Jack		
1991	Until the End of the World	Sam Farber, alias Trevor McPhee		
1992	The Plague	Dr. Bernard Rieux		
1993	Mr. Wonderful	Tom		
1994	Trial by Jury	Tommy Vesey		
1994	Second Best	Graham Holt		
1995	Smoke	Paul Benjamin		
1996	A Couch in New York	Henry Harriston		
1996	Michael	Frank Quinlan		
1996	Jane Eyre	Rochester		
1997	Loved	K.D. Dietrickson		
1998	Lost in Space	John Robinson		
1998	Dark City	Inspector Frank Bumstead		
1998	One True Thing	George Gulden		
1999	The 4th Floor	Greg Harrison		
1999	Sunshine	Andor Knorr		
1999	The Big Brass Ring	Blake		
1999	Do Not Disturb	Walter	a.k.a. Silent Witness	
1999	The Alexander Technique	Himself	Instructional film	
2000	Contaminated Man	David R. Whitman		
2000	The Miracle Maker	Jairus (voice)		
2001	Rare Birds	Restaurateur		
2001	A.I. Artificial Intelligence	Professor Allen Hobby		
2001	The Simian Line	Edward		
2002	Tuck Everlasting	Angus Tuck		
2002	Changing Lanes	Doyle's Sponsor		
2002	Nearest to Heaven	Matt		
2004	The Blue Butterfly	Alan Osbourne		
2004	The Village	Edward Walker		
2005	The King	David		
2005	A History of Violence	Richie Cusack		
2005	Neverwas	Dr. Peter Reed		
2005	Syriana	Stan		
2006	The Good Shepherd	CIA Director Philip Allen		
2006	The Legend of Sasquatch	John Davis (voice)	Also co-producer	
2007	Mr. Brooks	Marshall		
2007	Beautiful Ohio	Simon Messerman		
2007	Noise	Mayor Schneer		
2007	Into the Wild	Walt McCandless		
2008	Vantage Point	President Ashton		
2008	The Incredible Hulk	General Thaddeus Ross		
2009	The Countess	Gyorgy Thurzo		
2010	The Yellow Handkerchief	Brett		
2010	Robin Hood	William Marshal		
2011	The River Why	H2O		
2011	Late Bloomers	Adam		
2011	Hellgate	Warren Mills		
2012	J'enrage de son absence	Jacques		
2013	The Host	Jeb		
2013	The Disappearance of Eleanor Rigby	Julian Rigby		
2013	Fire in the Blood	Narrator (voice)	Documentary	
2013	Days and Nights	Herb		
2014	Winter's Tale	Isaac Penn		
2014	The Disappearance of Eleanor Rigby: Them	Julian Rigby		
2016	Race	Jeremiah Mahoney		
2016	Captain America: Civil War	Secretary Thaddeus Ross		
2018	The Miracle Season	Ernie Found		
2018	Avengers: Infinity War	Secretary Thaddeus Ross		
2019	Avengers: Endgame	Secretary Thaddeus Ross	Cameo	
2019	The Last Full Measure	Tom Tulley		
2021	Black Widow	Secretary Thaddeus Ross		
2022	The King's Daughter	Père La Chaise	Filmed in 2014	

=== Television ===
Year	Title	Role	Notes	Ref(s)
1977	The Best of Families	James Lathrop	Miniseries	
1977	Kojak	Jake	2 episodes	
1978	Verna: USO Girl	Walter	Television movie	
1981	All the Way Home	Jay Follet	Television movie	
1982	A Midsummer Night's Dream	Oberon	Television movie	
1989	Saturday Night Live	Himself	Episode: "Glenn Close/Gipsy Kings"	
1998	Lee Marvin: A Personal Portrait by John Boorman	Himself	Documentary	
2000	Frank Herbert's Dune	Duke Leto I Atreides	3 episodes	
2001	The Flamingo Rising	Turner Knight	Television movie	
2001	Varian's War	Varian Fry	Television movie	
2002	The King of Queens	Dr. Taber	Episode: "Shrink Wrap"	
2002	Master Spy: The Robert Hanssen Story	Robert Hanssen	Television movie	
2004	Frankenstein	Professor Waldman	Television movie	
2005	Hunt for Justice	General Montimer	Television movie	
2006	Nightmares & Dreamscapes	Jason Renshaw	Episode: "Battleground"	
2009	Endgame	Professor Willie Esterhuyse	Television movie	
2009	Damages	Daniel Purcell	10 episodes	
2011	Moby Dick	Captain Ahab	2 episodes	
2011	Too Big to Fail	Henry Paulson	Television movie	
2013	The Challenger Disaster	Richard Feynman	Television movie	
2013	Bonnie & Clyde	Frank Hamer	2 episodes	
2015	Humans	George Millican	7 episodes	
2016	Beowulf	Hrothgar	5 episodes	
2016–2021	Goliath	Donald Cooperman	14 episodes	
2018–2020	Condor	Bob Partridge	11 episodes	
2021	Mythic Quest	Peter Cromwell	Episode: "Peter"	
2022–2023	Pantheon	Stephen Holstrom (voice)	8 episodes; posthumous release	

=== Video games ===
Year	Game	Role	Notes
2008	The Incredible Hulk	Thaddeus Ross	Voice only

=== Audiobooks ===
Year	Book	Author	Role	Notes	Ref(s)
1989	The Polar Express	Chris Van Allsburg	Narrator	Cassette tape only	
2001	Hearts in Atlantis	Stephen King	Narrator		
2006	The Sun Also Rises	Ernest Hemingway	Narrator		
2006	Selected Shorts: Falling in Love	Various	Narrator		
2009	Selected Shorts: The William Hurt Collection	Various	Narrator		
2014	Consumed	David Cronenberg	Narrator		
2016	The Boy Who Drew Cats	Translated by Lafcadio Hearn	Narrator	Japanese fairy tale	

== Theater ==
Year	Project	Role	Venue
1975	Henry V	Lord Scrope / Interpreter / Bates	Delacorte Theatre, The Public Theater
1978	Fifth of July	Kenneth Talley Jr.	Sheridan Square Playhouse, Off-Broadway
1981	Childe Byron	Byron	Circle Repertory Theatre, Off-Broadway
1982	A Midsummer Night's Dream	Oberon	Delacorte Theatre, The Public Theater
1984–1985	Hurlyburly	Eddie	Goodman Theatre, Chicago; Ethel Barrymore Theatre, Broadway debut
1989	Beside Herself	Augie-Jake	Circle Repertory Theatre, Off-Broadway
1990	Love Letters	Andrew Makepeace Ladd III	Promenade Theatre, Off-Broadway
1990	Ivanov	Nikolai Alexeyevich Ivanov	Yale Repertory Theatre, CT
1992	Good	John Halder	American Conservatory Theatre, San Francisco
2003	Richard III	King Richard	Manitoba Theatre Centre
2010	Long Day's Journey into Night	James Tyrone	Sydney Theatre Company

== Awards and nominations ==
Year	Award	Category	Nominated work	Result	Ref.
1980	Golden Globe Award	Best New Actor – Motion Picture	Altered States	Nominated	
1985	Tony Award	Best Featured Actor in a Play	Hurlyburly	Nominated	
1985	Academy Award	Best Actor	Kiss of the Spider Woman	Won	
1985	BAFTA Award	Best Actor in a Leading Role	Kiss of the Spider Woman	Won	
1985	Golden Globe Award	Best Actor – Motion Picture Drama	Kiss of the Spider Woman	Nominated	
1985	Cannes Film Festival	Best Actor	Kiss of the Spider Woman	Won	
1985	David di Donatello Award	Best Foreign Actor	Kiss of the Spider Woman	Won	
1985	London Film Critics Circle Award	Actor of the Year	Kiss of the Spider Woman	Won	
1985	Los Angeles Film Critics Association Award	Best Actor	Kiss of the Spider Woman	Won	
1985	National Board of Review	Best Actor (tied with Raul Julia)	Kiss of the Spider Woman	Won	
1985	National Society of Film Critics	Best Actor	Kiss of the Spider Woman	Nominated	
1985	New York Film Critics Circle	Best Actor	Kiss of the Spider Woman	Nominated	
1986	Academy Award	Best Actor	Children of a Lesser God	Nominated	
1986	Golden Globe Award	Best Actor – Motion Picture Drama	Children of a Lesser God	Nominated	
1987	Academy Award	Best Actor	Broadcast News	Nominated	
1987	Golden Globe Award	Best Actor – Motion Picture Musical or Comedy	Broadcast News	Nominated	
1987	New York Film Critics Circle Award	Best Actor	Broadcast News	Nominated	
1988	Golden Horse Award	Best Foreign Actor	The Accidental Tourist	Won	
1991	Chicago Film Critics Association Award	Best Actor	The Doctor	Nominated	
1999	Genie Award	Best Actor in a Supporting Role	Sunshine	Nominated	
2001	Satellite Award	Best Actor – Miniseries or Television Film	Varian's War	Nominated	
2005	Academy Award	Best Supporting Actor	A History of Violence	Nominated	
2005	Austin Film Critics Association Award	Best Supporting Actor	A History of Violence	Won	
2005	Los Angeles Film Critics Association	Best Supporting Actor	A History of Violence	Won	
2005	New York Film Critics Circle Award	Best Supporting Actor	A History of Violence	Won	
2005	North Texas Film Critics Association Award	Best Supporting Actor	A History of Violence	Won	
2005	Utah Film Critics Association Award	Best Supporting Actor	A History of Violence	Won	
2005	Saturn Award	Best Supporting Actor	A History of Violence	Nominated	
2007	Screen Actors Guild Award	Outstanding Ensemble Cast in a Motion Picture	Into the Wild	Nominated	
2009	Primetime Emmy Award	Outstanding Supporting Actor in a Drama Series	Damages	Nominated	
2009	Golden Globe Award	Best Supporting Actor – Television	Damages	Nominated	
2009	Satellite Award	Best Actor – Miniseries or Television Film	Endgame	Nominated	
2011	Primetime Emmy Award	Outstanding Lead Actor in a Miniseries or Movie	Too Big to Fail	Nominated	
2011	Golden Globe Award	Best Actor – Miniseries or Television Film	Too Big to Fail	Nominated	
2011	Satellite Award	Best Actor – Miniseries or Television Film	Too Big to Fail	Nominated	
2013	Satellite Award	Best Supporting Actor – Television	Bonnie & Clyde	Nominated	
