= Minorco =

The Minorco SA (Minerals and Resources Company) was a mining company based in Luxembourg. It was set up by the South African Anglo American Corporation in 1987 to hold its non-African, non-diamond mining operations. Although Minorco was quoted on the Luxembourg Stock Exchange the majority of its shares were controlled by the Oppenheimer family through the Anglo American Corporation and its then sister company De Beers.

In 1998 Minorco merged with the Anglo American Corporation to create one of the world's biggest mining and natural resources companies with a stock market value of then $10 billion. The resulting company was called Anglo American plc and was based in London.

== History ==
The origin of Minorco dates back to 1928 when the Anglo American Corporation founded the Rhodesian Anglo American Limited in London. In 1954 the company moved its headquarter to Zambia and ten years later it changed its name to Zambian Anglo American Limited. In 1970, it moved to Bermuda. In 1974, the name changed to Minerals and Resources Company (Minorco) and the company was turned into the international mining investment arm of Anglo American Corporation to avoid the impact of economic sanctions against Apartheid. In the same year Anglo American transferred its 27% stake in Engelhard, an American mining and commodities trading conglomerate, to Minorco to further strengthen its financial basis.

In 1975 Minorco bought a 45% interest in Hudson Bay Mining and Smelting Company (Hudbay) followed in 1981 by the acquisition of substantial minority interests in the three natural resources companies Consolidated Gold Fields (29%), Newmont (22.4) and Charter Consolidated (36%). In the same year it entered the investment business via a 14% stake in the New York brokerage house Salomon Brothers. Salomon bought back that stake in 1987. In 1981, Minorco and Hudbay completed the acquisition of Engelhard for US$152 million. In 1987 Minorco was restructured, moved to Luxembourg and was named Minorco SA. Its shares were quoted on the Luxembourg Stock Exchange, but the Oppenheimer family kept the majority of its shares directly and indirectly via Anglo American Corporation and its then sister company De Beers.

In 1988 Minorco started a hostile and ultimately unsuccessful take-over bid for the full control of Consolidated Gold Fields (ConsGold), a British firm and the world's second-largest gold concern. With an offering price of US$5.65 billion, it was the largest attempted takeover in British corporate history. In 1989 Minorco agreed to sell its minority stake in Consolidated Gold Fields to Hanson, which had made an alternative all-cash takeover offer for ConsGold worth £3.5 billion.

With the end of the apartheid system in South Africa at the beginning of the 1990s and the growing threat of nationalizing its assets, the Anglo American Corporation increased its overseas investments and transferred assets outside South Africa it still directly owned into Luxembourg-based Minorco. Minorco expanded its North American mining operations by acquiring the American firm Freeport-McMoRan Gold Company from its parent Freeport-McMoRan in 1990 and took full control of the Canadian-based Hudson Bay Mining & Smelting in 1991 for US$86.8 million. In a 1993 $1.4 billion stock and asset swap, Minorco took over the South American, European, and Australian operations of both Anglo American Corporation and De Beers, which meant that all of Anglo American's non-African, non-diamond assets were now consolidated within Minorco and out of the reach of nationalization.

Minorco released lower earnings for 1997 and a cut in its dividend because of a slump in world commodity prices. In 1998 the Anglo American Corporation unveiled a merger with Minorco to create one of the world's biggest mining and natural resources companies with a stock market value of then $10 billion. The new company was called Anglo American plc and was based in London.

As part of the merger Minorco announced it would sell its gold interests, mainly in North and South America, and its stakes in fertilizer maker Terra Industries, as well as its 31.8% stake in Engelhard. At the same time Anglo American Corporation said it would dispose of its interests in South Africa's Beverage and Consumer Industries Holdings and South African Breweries.
