= Gawain Towler =

British politician, political strategist and journalist

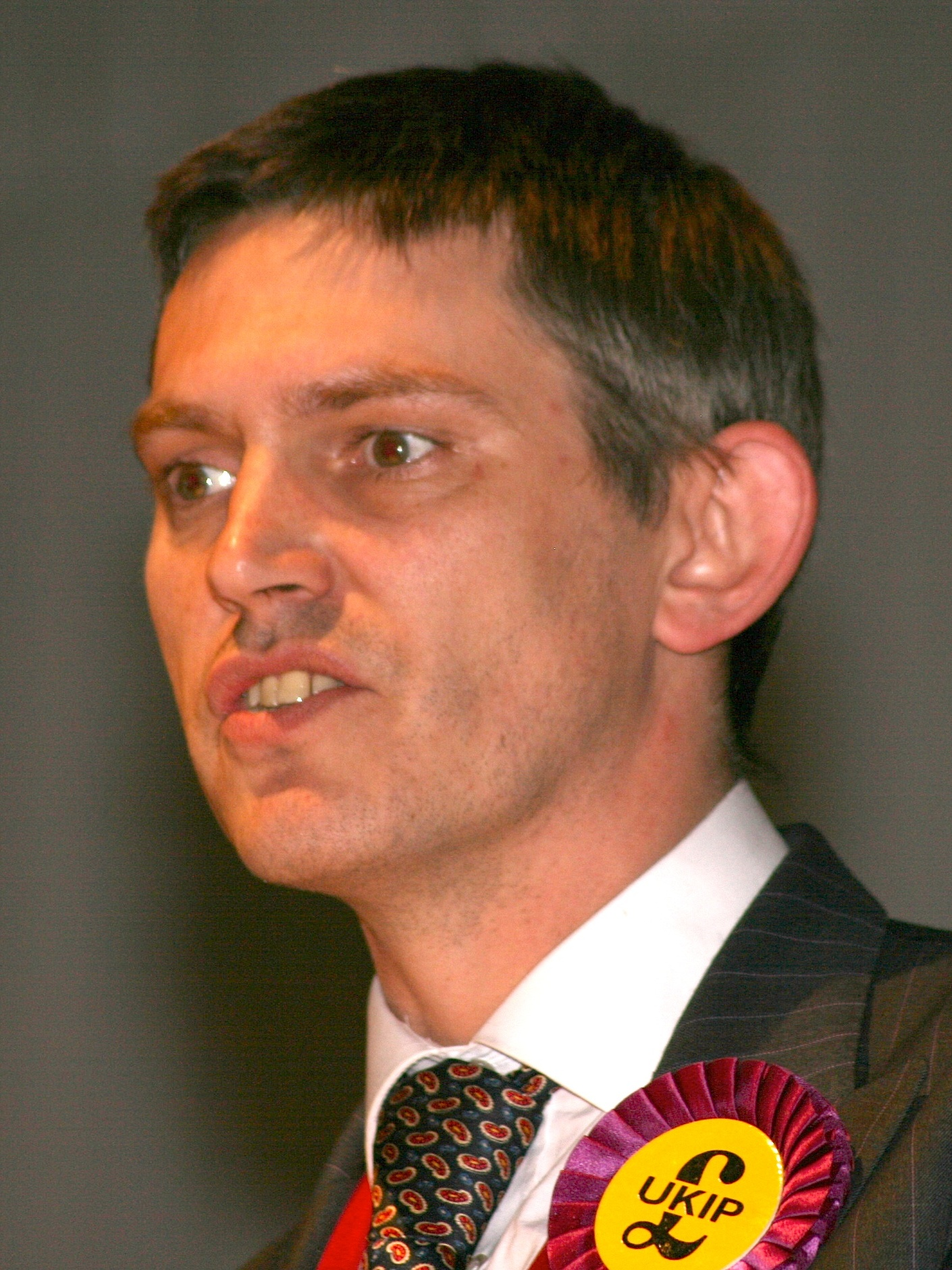
- Towler in 2009

Member of Reform UK Governing Board
- Incumbent
- Assumed office 22 August 2025

Head of Press for the UK Independence Party
- In office 2009–2018
- Leader: Nigel Farage; Malcolm Pearson; Diane James; Paul Nuttall; Henry Bolton

Director of Communications for Reform UK
- In office 2019–2024
- Leader: Catherine Blaiklock; Richard Tice; Nigel Farage
- Succeeded by: Ed Sumner

Personal details
- Born: Gawain Howard Wilkinson Towler; 24 December 1967 (age 58) Devon, England
- Party: Reform UK (2019–present)
- Other party: Conservative (until 2004); UK Independence Party (2004–2018)
- Spouse: Joslin
- Children: 1
- Education: Clayesmore School
- Alma mater: University of York (BA)

Gawain Howard Wilkinson Towler (born 24 December 1967) is a British politician, political strategist and journalist best known for his involvement in British Eurosceptic movements. He has served on the governing board of Reform UK (Note: Known as the Brexit Party from 23 November 2018 to 4 January 2021.) since 2025, having previously served as its director of communications from 2019 to 2024. He previously served as a press officer for the UK Independence Party (UKIP) from 2004 to 2017 and as an advisor for the Conservative Party from 1999 to 2002. He is also the owner and founder of CWC Strategy, a communications and strategy agency. He has contributed to various national publications, including The Daily Telegraph, The Spectator, CapX, The Critic, and Spiked, where he writes on topics such as foreign affairs, politics, society, and culture.

Towler was initially a member of the Conservative Party, standing for them in the 2001 UK general election and the 2003 Scottish Parliament election. In 2004, Nigel Farage recruited Towler to UKIP as a press officer, later leading its media operations and also standing for UKIP in the 2009 and 2014 European Parliament elections. He left UKIP in 2018 and joined the Brexit Party, later rebranded Reform UK, in 2019, where he was the director of communications until his dismissal in 2024, before being elected to serve on its governing board by party members in 2025.

== Early life and career ==
Gawain Howard Wilkinson Towler was born on 24 December 1967 in Devon, England. He was educated at Clayesmore School, Dorset, and later studied philosophy at the University of York, graduating with a Bachelor of Arts degree in 1993. While at York, he was chairman of the University of York Conservative and Unionist Association.

From 1994 to 1996, Towler worked at Lottery Promotion Company Ltd as a public affairs officer. He was a temp from 1996 to 1998 and also freelanced as a journalist from 1997 to 1999. In 1999, he became an advisor on international development at the European Parliament.

== Political career ==
=== Conservative Party ===
Towler began his political career as a member of the Conservative Party and ran as the Conservative candidate for Glasgow Maryhill in the 2001 UK general election, coming in fifth place with 5.2% of the vote. He later stood as a Conservative candidate in the 2003 Scottish Parliament election for the Glasgow Kelvin constituency, coming in fifth place with 8.2% of the vote.

From 1999 to 2002, Towler worked at the European Parliament in Brussels as an assistant and advisor to Nirj Deva, Conservative member of the European Parliament (MEP) for South East England. During this time, he became critical of the European Union's influence and transitioned toward Euroscepticism. In 2002, he left Deva's office to co-found and edit The Sprout, a satirical magazine focused on EU politics.

=== UK Independence Party ===
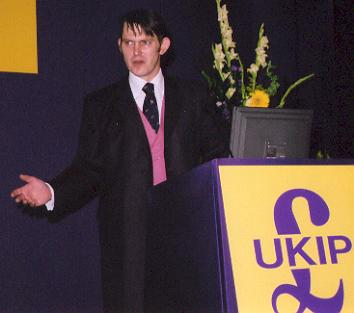
Towler in 2008

In 2004, Nigel Farage recruited Towler to join UKIP as a press officer. By 2009, he had become UKIP's head of Press, leading the party's media operations. He held this position through the 2016 Brexit referendum until early 2018, when he stepped down following UKIP's decline.

Towler stood for UKIP in the European Parliament constituency of South West England in the 2009 and 2014 European Parliament elections. He was placed third on UKIP's party list on both occasions, but was not elected. In 2016, he stood for UKIP in a Southwark London Borough Council by-election for the ward of Newington. He came in fifth place with 4.9% of the vote.

=== Brexit Party and Reform UK ===
In 2019, Towler became director of Communications for the newly-formed Brexit Party, where he played a key role in shaping its messaging during the 2019 European Parliament elections. After the Brexit Party rebranded as Reform UK in 2021, Towler continued as the party's chief press officer under Richard Tice. He remained in this role until 2024, when he was dismissed by party chair Zia Yusuf as part of a party restructuring effort.

In 2025, Towler was elected to the governing board of Reform UK in a vote of party members.

== Personal life ==
Towler is married to Joslin. They have a daughter who was born in 2004.
