= Ed Sumner =

British political communications adviser

Head of communications for Reform UK
- Incumbent
- Assumed office 2024
- Preceded by: Gawain Towler

Personal details
- Occupation: Political communications adviser

Ed Sumner is a British political communications adviser who became head of communications for Reform UK in 2024. He previously worked as a senior adviser to Laura Anne Jones, then a Welsh Conservative Member of the Senedd.

== Career ==
Sumner left Jones's employment in the summer of 2024 and succeeded Gawain Towler as Reform's head of communications. His appointment was part of then chairman Zia Yusuf's efforts to professionalise the party after the 2024 general election. PoliticsHome reported that some party figures opposed the appointment because of earlier reporting about Sumner's WhatsApp messages.

The Guardian described Sumner as running Reform's press operation in 2025. In March 2026, The Spectator reported that he had arranged a conference call between Nigel Farage and Yusuf after Yusuf's brief resignation as chairman in June 2025.

In May 2026, The Spectator reported that Sumner would be among the officials giving final approval to prospective Reform parliamentary candidates after an application and assessment process. Bloomberg identified him as one of Farage's trusted aides in August 2026.

== Media coverage ==
In June 2024, Nation.Cymru published WhatsApp messages from January that year in which Sumner criticised London's New Year's fireworks display for focusing on “immigration, diversity and gays”. It also reported messages about Welsh Conservative politician Natasha Asghar and her late father, Mohammad Asghar. In October, PoliticsHome reported that the Conservative Party had no record of disciplining Sumner over the comments.

In November 2025, barrister Adam Richardson, acting for Sumner, asked Nation.Cymru to remove Sumner's name from coverage of Senedd disciplnary proceedings involving Jones. Richardson claimed that identifying Sumner infringed his privacy and threatened legal action. The publication refused, arguing that naming him was in the public interest. Richardson denied bullying or attempting to inhibit legitimate reporting.

Later that month, Nation.Cymru reported that Sumner had used an obscene insult about journalist Will Hayward in a Reform WhatsApp group. The exchange followed Hayward's criticism of the party's decision not to name a Welsh leader before the 2026 Sened election. In December, the outlet published further messages, dated December 2024, in which Sumner asked colleagues not to share its articles and called its journalists “vile nats”.

The National Union of Journalists' Welsh Executive Council criticised the legal threats and Sumner's language about a journalist. In a statement published on its website on 16 December 2025, it called on Senedd members to defend press freedom.

== ITV undercover investigation ==
On 15 October 2026, ITV News reported on an undercover investigation in which a reporter obtained a job in Reform's press office. At the party's Christmas event in December 2025, Sumner told the reporter that the job involved “defending the indefensible”.

ITV reported that Sumner described Chris Parry, then a Reform mayoral candidate, as “clearly a racist” over posts questioning the loyalty of black and Asian politcians, and expected him to be dismissed. In footage recorded three weeks later, Farage favoured an apology to David Lammy rather than dismissal. Sumner told Farage, “You're protecting him”, and later said that he would have expelled Parry months earlier.

Parry defended his posts as criticism of public figures and said they should be read in context. Reform said it rejected racism, had begun investigations and imposed some suspensions, and would follow due process.
