= Francis Algernon Govett =

- Born: 1858
- Died: October 27, 1926 (aged 67–68)

Francis Algernon Govett

Francis Algernon Govett (1858 – October 27, 1926) was a British stockbroker who was a director of many mining companies, was closely involved with future American president Herbert Hoover, and later became the chairman of the Burma Corporation. His business practices were sharply criticized by anti-corruption campaigner Walter Liggett in his 1932 book, The Rise of Herbert Hoover.

== Early life ==
Francis Algernon Govett was born in 1858, the eldest son of Adolphus Frederick Govett of Laleham, a director of the South-Western Railway. He received his BA in law from University College, Oxford, in 1880, after which he embarked on a career in the City of London.

== Career ==
Govett became a partner in the stockbroking firm of Govett, Sons, and Co. in 1879. Early in his career he took an interest in the discoveries of silver-lead and zinc at Broken Hill in New South Wales, Australia, and throughout his life took an active part in the management of companies exploiting those resources and other mining discoveries.

He was closely involved with mining engineer and businessman John Agnew and future American president Herbert Hoover, also a mining engineer, and together they were involved in promoting many mining companies from which Govett and his fellow directors made a great deal of money while many private shareholders lost money.

He was managing director of the Zinc Corporation for many years and became chairman of the Burma Corporation.

== Family ==
His son was Commander Leonard Evelyn Romaine Govett (RNVR) who died in 1944 or 1945 at Sydney, New South Wales, in a plane crash. Another son was John Romaine Govett, Chairman of Zinc Corporation.

== Death ==
Govett died at Sunningdale, Berkshire, on 27 October 1926.
