= Morrisroe =

Morrisroe is a surname.

== List of people with the surname ==
- Brian Morrisroe (born 1972), Irish footballer
- James Morrisroe (1875–1937), Irish politician
- Mark Morrisroe (1959–1989), American performance artist and photographer
- Patrick Morrisroe (1869–1946), Irish priest
- Patricia Morrisroe, American journalist
