= Rudolph Agnew =

British businessman (1934–2023)

- Born: 12 March 1934
- Died: 14 September 2023 (aged 89)
- Education: Downside School
- Employer: Consolidated Gold Fields
- Relatives: John Alexander Agnew (grandfather)

Sir Rudolph Ion Joseph Agnew (12 March 1934 – 14 September 2023) was a British businessman who was group chief executive of Consolidated Gold Fields from 1978 to 1989 and chairman from 1983 to 1989.

== Early life ==
Rudolph Agnew was born on 12 March 1934, the son of Rudolph John Agnew and Pamela Geraldine (née Campbell). His grandfather was the mining engineer John Alexander Agnew (1872–1939). He was educated at Downside School.

== Career ==
Agnew was group chief executive of Consolidated Gold Fields from 1978 to 1989 and chairman from 1983 to 1989.

Agnew was knighted in the 2002 New Year Honours.

Sir Rudolph Agnew died on 14 September 2023, at the age of 89.
