= Consolidated Gold Fields =

- Type: Public
- Industry: Mining
- Founded: 1887
- Founder: Cecil Rhodes
- Defunct: 1988
- Fate: Acquired
- Successor: Hanson
- Headquarters: London, England
- Key people: Rudolph Agnew (Chairman)

Consolidated Gold Fields was a British gold-mining company. It was listed on the London Stock Exchange and was a constituent of the FTSE 100 Index until it was acquired by Hanson in 1988.

== History ==
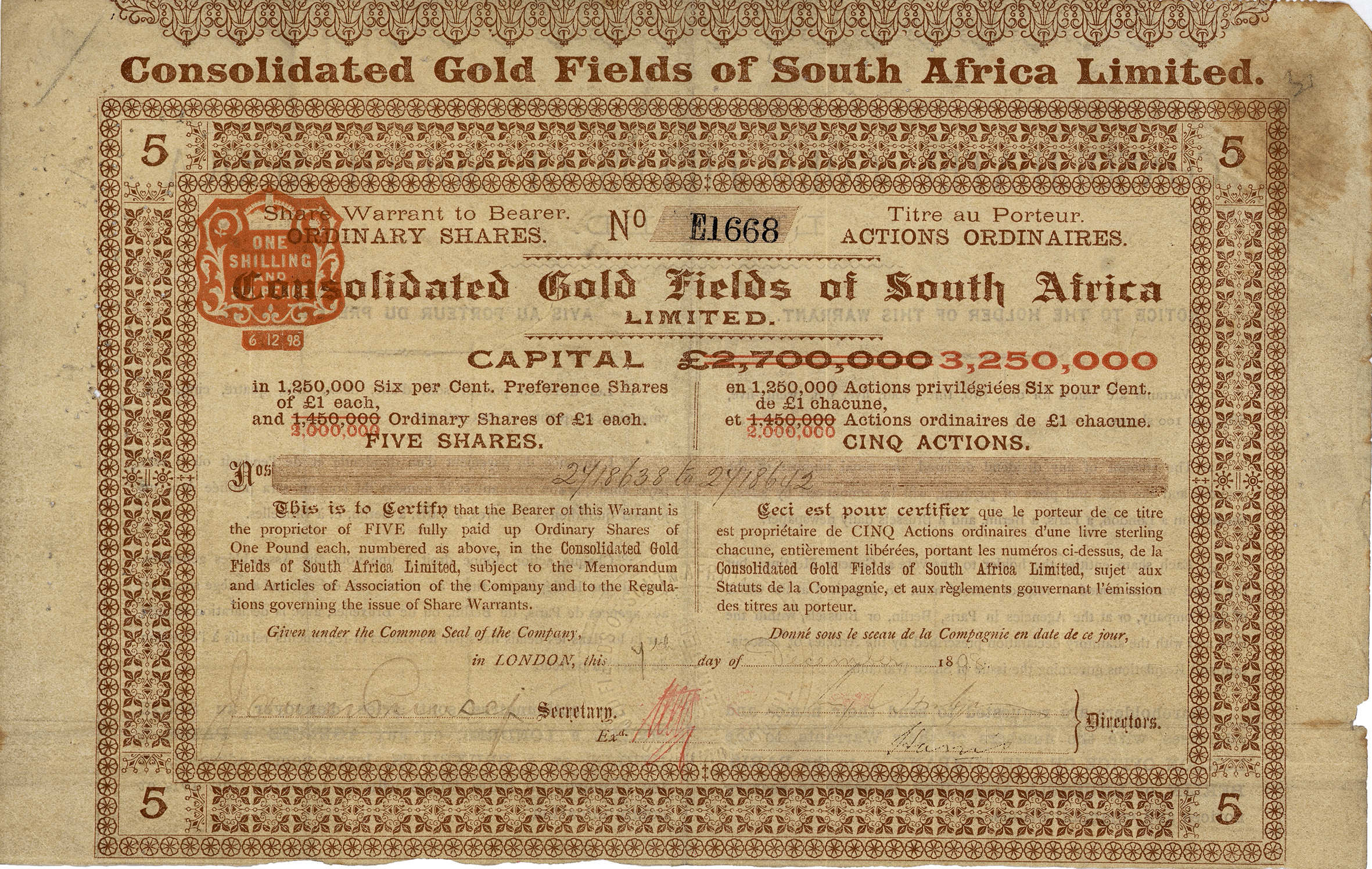
Shares of the Consolidated Gold Fields of South Africa, issued 7. December 1898

Consolidated Gold Fields of South Africa was founded in 1887 and incorporated in London to fund the newly discovered gold reefs in the Transvaal. By 1900 it had already started to diversify outside South Africa. After 1945 it acquired mines in the United States and Australia. Until the 1970s, it was predominantly a mining finance house receiving income from passive investments. In 1970 A.R.O. Williams O.B.E, who was then Managing Director, retired.

After the 1970s it transformed itself into natural resource group concentrating on a relatively small number of minerals. The company had three major wholly owned subsidiaries: Amalgamated Roadstone Corporation, Gold fields Corporation and ARC America, both in the United States.

By the late 1980s it was considering withdrawing from South Africa completely. It was then the subject of an acrimonious, hostile and unsuccessful take-over bid by Minorco early in 1988.

Consolidated Gold Fields played a key role in ending apartheid in South Africa; Michael Young, the company's public affairs director embarked on the controversial course of initiating secret discussions between the South African government and the African National Congress at Mells Park House in the company's estate in Somerset. This ultimately resulted in the release of Nelson Mandela in 1990 and the handover of power to majority rule: the events are described in book The Fall of Apartheid by Robert Harvey and the 2009 television film Endgame.

== Demise of the business ==
The company was acquired by Hanson in 1988 for £3.5bn.
