= Strathcona =

Strathcona is a 19th-century variation of "Glen Coe", a river valley in Scotland. The word was invented for use in the title Baron Strathcona and Mount Royal, first used for Donald Smith (1820–1914), a Canadian railway financier, in order to avoid association with the Massacre of Glencoe of 1692.

Strathcona may refer to:

== People ==
- Baron Strathcona and Mount Royal
  - Donald Smith, 1st Baron Strathcona and Mount Royal
  - Margaret Howard, 2nd Baroness Strathcona and Mount Royal
  - Donald Howard, 3rd Baron Strathcona and Mount Royal
  - Euan Howard, 4th Baron Strathcona and Mount Royal

== Places ==
=== Canada ===
==== Alberta ====
- Old Strathcona, Edmonton, the former core of the City of Strathcona and now a Provincial Historic Area and arts and entertainment district
- Strathcona, Alberta, a former city, now a part of Edmonton
- Strathcona, Edmonton, a neighbourhood, part of the former city
- Strathcona County, a municipality outside Edmonton
- Strathcona Park, Calgary, a neighbourhood

==== Other places in Canada ====
- Strathcona (Hamilton, Ontario), a neighbourhood
- Strathcona, Vancouver, British Columbia, a neighbourhood
- Strathcona Islands, Nunavut
- Strathcona Park (Ottawa), a park in Ottawa, Ontario
- Strathcona Provincial Park, British Columbia
- Strathcona Regional District, Vancouver Island, British Columbia
- Strathcona Township, Ontario, a geographic township

=== Other places ===
- Mount Strathcona, Antarctica
- Strathcona, Minnesota, United States

== Canadian electoral districts ==
- Edmonton Strathcona (federal electoral district), current federal electoral district
- Edmonton-Strathcona (provincial electoral district), current provincial electoral district
- Strathcona (federal electoral district), former federal electoral district
- Strathcona (territorial electoral district), former Northwest Territories electoral district
- Strathcona (provincial electoral district), former provincial electoral district
- Strathcona-Sherwood Park, current provincial electoral district
- Vancouver-Strathcona, current provincial electoral district

== Education ==
- Lord Strathcona Elementary School, Vancouver, British Columbia, Canada
- Strathcona Baptist Girls Grammar School, a private school for girls in Canterbury, Victoria, Australia
- Old Scona, a high school in Edmonton, Alberta, Canada
- Strathcona Composite High School, Edmonton, Alberta, Canada
- Strathcona Elementary School, part of Winnipeg School Division, Manitoba, Canada

== Other ==
- Lord Strathcona Medal, the highest civilian citation a Canadian cadet can receive
- Lord Strathcona's Horse (Royal Canadians), Canadian Forces regiment
- Strathcona (genus), a genus of rodent and sister genus to Masillamys
- Strathcona (HBC vessel), a sternwheel paddle steamer operated by the Hudson's Bay Company from 1898–1902 on the Pacific Northwest coast, see Hudson's Bay Company vessels

== See also ==
- Strathcona Park (disambiguation)
- Transcona, Winnipeg
