= North Cumberland =

Parliamentary constituency in the United Kingdom, 1918–1950

- Former county constituency for the House of Commons

1918–1950
- Seats: one
- Created from: Eskdale and Penrith
- Replaced by: Penrith and The Border

North Cumberland (also "Cumberland Northern") was a parliamentary constituency in Cumberland which returned one Member of Parliament (MP) to the House of Commons of the Parliament of the United Kingdom, elected by the first past the post system of election.

The constituency was created for the 1918 general election, and abolished for the 1950 general election.

== Boundaries ==
The Urban Districts of Holme Cultram and Wigton, the Rural Districts of Brampton, Carlisle, and Longtown, and part of the Rural District of Wigton. (Carlisle, Brampton and Longtown rural districts merged in 1930 into the Border Rural District)

== Members of Parliament ==
Year	Member	Whip
1918	Christopher Lowther	Unionist
1921	Christopher Lowther	Independent Parliamentary Group
1922	Donald Howard	Unionist
1926	Sir Fergus Graham	Unionist
1935	Wilfrid Roberts	Liberal
1950	Constituency abolished	

== Election results ==
=== Election in the 1910s ===
General election 14 December 1918: Cumberland North
Party		Candidate	Votes	%	±%
C	Unionist	Christopher Lowther	Unopposed		
	Unionist win (new seat)				
C indicates candidate endorsed by the coalition government.

=== Election in the 1920s ===
General election 1922: Cumberland North
Party	Candidate	Votes	%	±%
Unionist	Donald Howard	8,815	50.8	N/A
Liberal	Geoffrey Howard	8,544	49.2	New
Majority		271	1.6	N/A
Turnout		17,359	79.9	N/A
Registered electors		21,714		
Unionist hold		Swing	N/A	

General election 1923: Cumberland North
Party	Candidate	Votes	%	±%
Unionist	Donald Howard	9,288	50.6	−0.2
Liberal	Richard Durning Holt	9,070	49.4	+0.2
Majority		218	1.2	−0.4
Turnout		18,358	83.2	+3.3
Registered electors		22,075		
Unionist hold		Swing	−0.2	

General election 1924: Cumberland North
Party	Candidate	Votes	%	±%
Unionist	Donald Howard	10,586	54.2	+3.6
Liberal	Richard Durning Holt	6,821	34.9	−14.5
Labour	B. Brooke	2,125	10.9	New
Majority		3,765	19.3	+18.1
Turnout		19,532	86.0	+2.8
Registered electors		22,717		
Unionist hold		Swing	+9.1	

1926 North Cumberland by-election
Party	Candidate	Votes	%	±%
Unionist	Fergus Graham	8,867	47.8	−6.4
Liberal	Richard Durning Holt	6,871	37.1	+2.2
Labour	H. W. McIntyre	2,793	15.1	+4.2
Majority		1,996	10.7	−8.6
Turnout		18,331	82.0	−4.0
Registered electors		22,607		
Unionist hold		Swing	−4.3	

General election 1929: Cumberland North
Party	Candidate	Votes	%	±%
Unionist	Fergus Graham	10,392	44.9	−9.3
Liberal	Richard Durning Holt	9,661	41.7	+6.8
Labour	C. A. O'Donnell	3,092	13.4	+2.5
Majority		731	3.2	−16.1
Turnout		23,145	83.7	−2.3
Registered electors		27,653		
Unionist hold		Swing	−8.1	

=== Elections in the 1930s ===
General election 1931: Cumberland North
Party	Candidate	Votes	%	±%
Conservative	Fergus Graham	12,504	52.7	+7.8
Liberal	Wilfrid Roberts	11,227	47.3	+5.6
Majority		1,277	5.4	+2.2
Turnout		23,781	84.6	+0.9
Conservative hold		Swing		

General election 1935: Cumberland North
Party	Candidate	Votes	%	±%
Liberal	Wilfrid Roberts	12,521	51.9	−0.8
Conservative	Fergus Graham	11,627	48.1	+0.8
Majority		894	3.8	N/A
Turnout		24,148	83.9	−0.7
Liberal gain from Conservative		Swing		

General Election 1939–40:

Another General Election was required to take place before the end of 1940. The political parties had been making preparations for an election to take place from 1939 and by the end of this year, the following candidates had been selected;

- Liberal: Wilfrid Roberts
- Conservative:

=== Election in the 1940s ===
General election 1945: Cumberland North
Party	Candidate	Votes	%	±%
Liberal	Wilfrid Roberts	12,053	50.4	−1.5
Conservative	Ronald Nicholson Carr	11,855	49.6	+1.5
Majority		198	0.83	−3.0
Turnout		23,908	75.7	−8.2
Liberal hold		Swing		
