= Arthur Howard (politician) =

British politician (1896–1971)

Sir Arthur Jared Palmer Howard KBE CVO (30 May 1896 – 26 April 1971) was a British Army officer and politician.

Howard was the youngest son of Margaret Charlotte Howard, 2nd Baroness Strathcona and Mount Royal and brother of the 3rd Baron. He was Mayor of Westminster during the period 1936–1937. He was a Conservative Member of Parliament (MP) for Westminster St George's from 1945 to 1950.

Through his wife, Lady Leonora Stanley Baldwin, Howard was the son-in-law of British Prime Minister Stanley Baldwin and Lucy Baldwin, Countess Baldwin of Bewdley.

Parliament of the United Kingdom
Preceded by Duff Cooper	Member of Parliament for Westminster St George's; 1945 – 1950	Succeeded by Constituency abolished
