= Nethermost Pike =

Fell in Cumbria, England

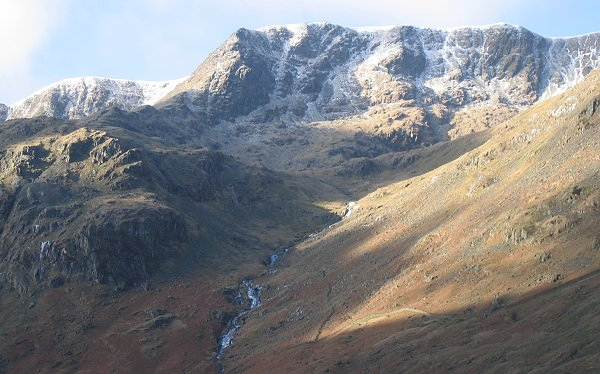
- Nethermost Pike from Grisedale

Highest point
- Elevation: 891 m (2,923 ft)
- Prominence: 22 m (72 ft)
- Parent peak: Helvellyn
- Listing: Wainwright, Nuttall
- Coordinates: 54°31′08″N 3°00′59″W

Geography
- Location within the Lake District
- Location: Cumbria, England
- Parent range: Lake District, Eastern Fells
- OS grid: NY343142
- Topo map: OS Explorer OL5, Landranger 90

Nethermost Pike is a fell in Cumbria, England, and a part of the Lake District. At 891 metres (2,923 ft) it is the second highest Wainwright in the Helvellyn range, the highest of which is Helvellyn itself. It is located close to the southern end of the ridge, with Helvellyn to the north, and High Crag and Dollywaggon Pike to the south. Nethermost Pike, along with many of the Eastern Fells, lies between Thirlmere in the west and the Ullswater catchment in the east. The closest villages are Glenridding and Patterdale on the shores of Ullswater, over 8 kilometres (5 mi) away.

Like most fells in the Helvellyn range, Nethermost Pike has grassy western slopes and rocky outcrops on the eastern side. Geologically, Nethermost Pike belongs to the Borrowdale Volcanic Group. Lead was once mined on its eastern slopes, resulting in open workings and underground mines. The eastern slopes are protected as part of a Site of Special Scientific Interest because of the Pike's geological and biological features, which include some of England's best arctic-alpine and tall-herb vegetation.

== Classification ==
Mountains are often classified according to their heights. At 891 metres (2,923 ft) Nethermost Pike is listed as a Nuttall, which requires an elevation of 610 metres (2,000 ft). However, with a prominence of 22 metres (72 ft) it is not counted as a Hewitt or Marilyn which require prominences of 30 metres (98 ft) and 150 metres (492 ft) respectively. Nethermost Pike is also counted as a Wainwright because it was given a chapter in Alfred Wainwright's Pictorial Guide to the Lakeland Fells. It is the second-highest of the Eastern Fells, and the ninth highest of all the Wainwrights. South of Nethermost Pike is High Crag 884 metres (2,900 ft), which is separated from Nethermost Pike by a very limited depression. Most guidebooks follow Alfred Wainwright in considering High Crag to be a part of Nethermost Pike. This convention is not universally followed however, with author Bill Birkett preferring to differentiate between the two fells.

== Topography ==
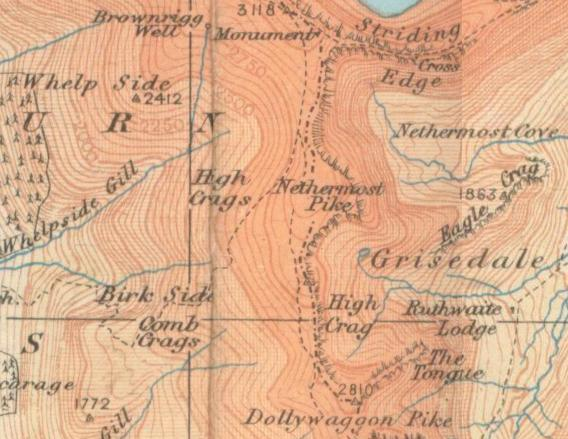
1925 map showing Nethermost Pike and its surrounding features

The Helvellyn range runs broadly north-south for about 11 kilometres (7 miles), remaining above 600 metres (1,970 ft) throughout its length. Nethermost Pike is toward the southern end of this ridge, with Helvellyn itself to the north and Dollywaggon Pike to the south. In common with much of the Helvellyn range there is a marked contrast between the western and eastern slopes of Nethermost Pike. In Wainwright's words: "The grassy western slope trodden by the multitudes is of little interest, but the fell should not be judged accordingly: it is made of sterner stuff. From the east, Nethermost Pike is magnificent, hardly less so than Helvellyn."

The western slopes fall smoothly to the head of Thirlmere reservoir, and the tiny church at Wythburn. There are rougher areas, High and Comb Crags in particular, but these do little to change the overall impression of high moorland. The lower slopes have been planted with conifers as part of the Thirlmere Forest, but above this is a sense of wide open space. Nethermost Pike's toehold on the valley is shifted a little to the south, relative to its position on the ridge. This is because Whelpside and Birkside Gills, its boundary streams, both run south-west, rather than flowing straight down the slope.

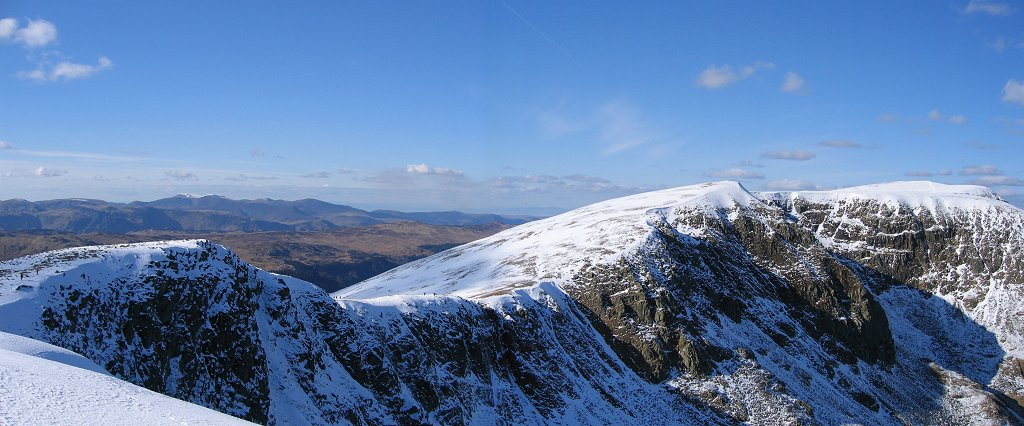
High Crag and Nethermost Pike seen from Dollywaggon Pike

On the east, the first impression is all of rock. The long strath of Grisedale runs north-eastward to Ullswater, cutting off a series of hanging valleys which fall from the Helvellyn range. To the south east of Nethermost Pike, below the summit of High Crag, is Ruthwaite Cove. Surrounded by crag on three sides, this corrie contains Hard Tarn, a small pool on a rock shelf. This is one of the most difficult mountain tarns to locate, and its black algal bed and clear water combine to give the false impression of great depth. Ruthwaite Cove is now the site of Ruthwaite Lodge, a climbing hut. It was formerly the setting for more industrial activity, with the remains of several underground mines and some shallow open workings visible near the Lodge.

Between Ruthwaite and Nethermost Coves, Nethermost Pike sends out a fine rocky ridge. This arête, although not as imposing as Striding Edge across Nethermost Cove, ascends by a series of rocky steps for three quarters of a mile, making straight for the summit. It is from this angle, rather than from the west, that the fell earns the sobriquet of "Pike", meaning peaked mountain. At the bottom of the ridge is Eagle Crag, standing above Grisedale Beck and forcing walkers to take a detour from the ridgeline.

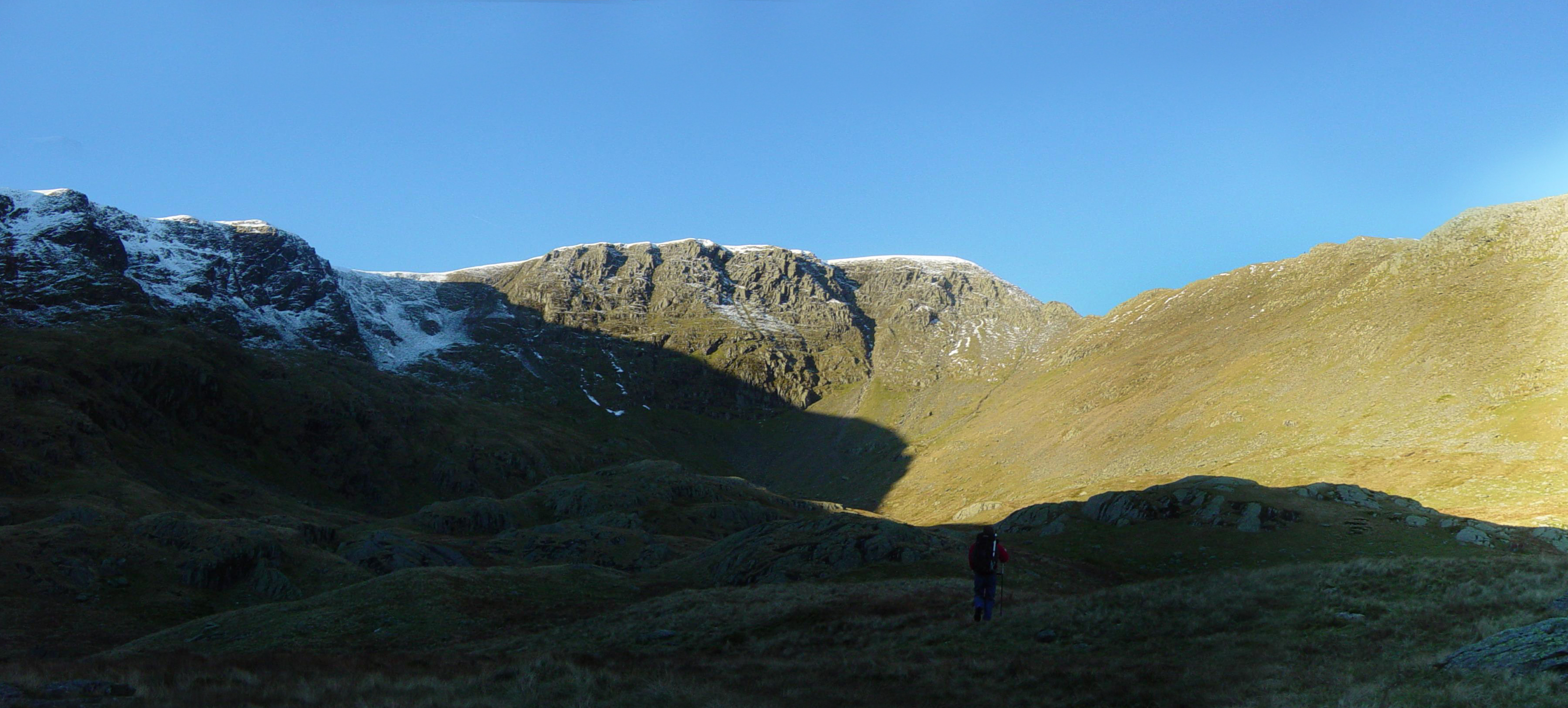
Nethermost Cove

North from Nethermost Pike is the depression of Swallow Scarth, above the head of Nethermost Cove. From here the ridge climbs again, turning to the west as the long plateau of Helvellyn top is reached. Southwards the ridge steps down over High Crag, and narrows as it swings east around Ruthwaite Cove to Dollywaggon Pike. A heavily eroded path runs along the ridge, but actually bypasses the top of Nethermost Pike to the west, as it leads to Helvellyn.

The summit area is triangular in plan with ridges running to the north, south and east. The actual top is toward the northern corner and set back a little from the drop to Nethermost Cove. There is a rash of stones on the summit although the surroundings are mostly covered in rough grass, and several small cairns have been built. Other than northward, where the bulk of Helvellyn intervenes, the view is extensive, with much of the Lake District visible. Further ground is brought into view from the summit of High Crag.

== Ascents ==
The Lake District receives over 12 million visitors a year, many of whom come to climb the mountains. The closest villages to Nethermost Pike are Glenridding and Patterdale, 8 kilometres (5 miles) to the east, close to the shores of Ullswater. Both are common starting points for climbing Nethermost Pike or other fells in the Helvellyn range. The best ascents from the east is the east ridge, reached either from the path to Eagle Crag Mine, or via Ruthwaite Lodge and Hard Tarn. There are no settlements of note close to Nethermost Pike to the west, and many walkers start from a car park at Wythburn, close to Wythburn Church. This is a popular route which follows a wide track to Helvellyn before branching off right at Swallow Scarth. Alternatives are possible on the smooth flanks of the fell, but all are pathless.

Because of its close proximity to the higher Helvellyn, Nethermost Pike receives fewer visitors. When climbing from the west many people traverse the western slopes on their way to Helvellyn. Despite this the summit does still receive a large number of walkers, who use a large number of footpaths. The large number of footpaths causes significant disturbance to the summit vegetation, which could be greatly reduced by using fewer footpaths.

== Geology ==
Geologically the summit of the fell forms part of the Deepdale Formation, (principally volcaniclastic sandstone) underlain by the dacitic lapilli tuff of the Helvellyn Formation. The geology of much of the Lake District is the Borrowdale Volcanic Group, of which Nethermost Pike is part, and is late Ordovician in age. The eastern cliffs of the range, including those of Nethermost Pike, are rich in base minerals. When these rocks weather they form areas of fertile soil, which together with the area's inaccessibility and climate provide suitable conditions for plants of biological importance.

Mining was carried out in Ruthwaite Cove, and the remains of several levels and some shallow open workings are visible near Ruthwaite Lodge. These excavations were made in a search for lead-bearing galena, and are believed to have been worked in the 16th century. Further leases were taken out in 1784 and 1862; the last known operation was in 1880.

North-east of the summit the scene is repeated in Nethermost Cove, where the Eagle Crag Mine was mined for its lead and zinc. The vein which was exploited forms a visible gully on Eagle Crag, and was worked both above and below ground over an altitude of 300 metres (980 ft). The vein is surrounded by rocks from the Borrowdale Volcanic Group, which dates from the Ordovician. Large dumps of veinstone are found in the area as a result of the mining. They contain, among other minerals, crystallised tetrahedrite, which is not believed to be able to be seen or collected anywhere else in Britain. Eagle Crag Mine has a history of working similar to that of Ruthwaite Lodge.

== Biological interest ==
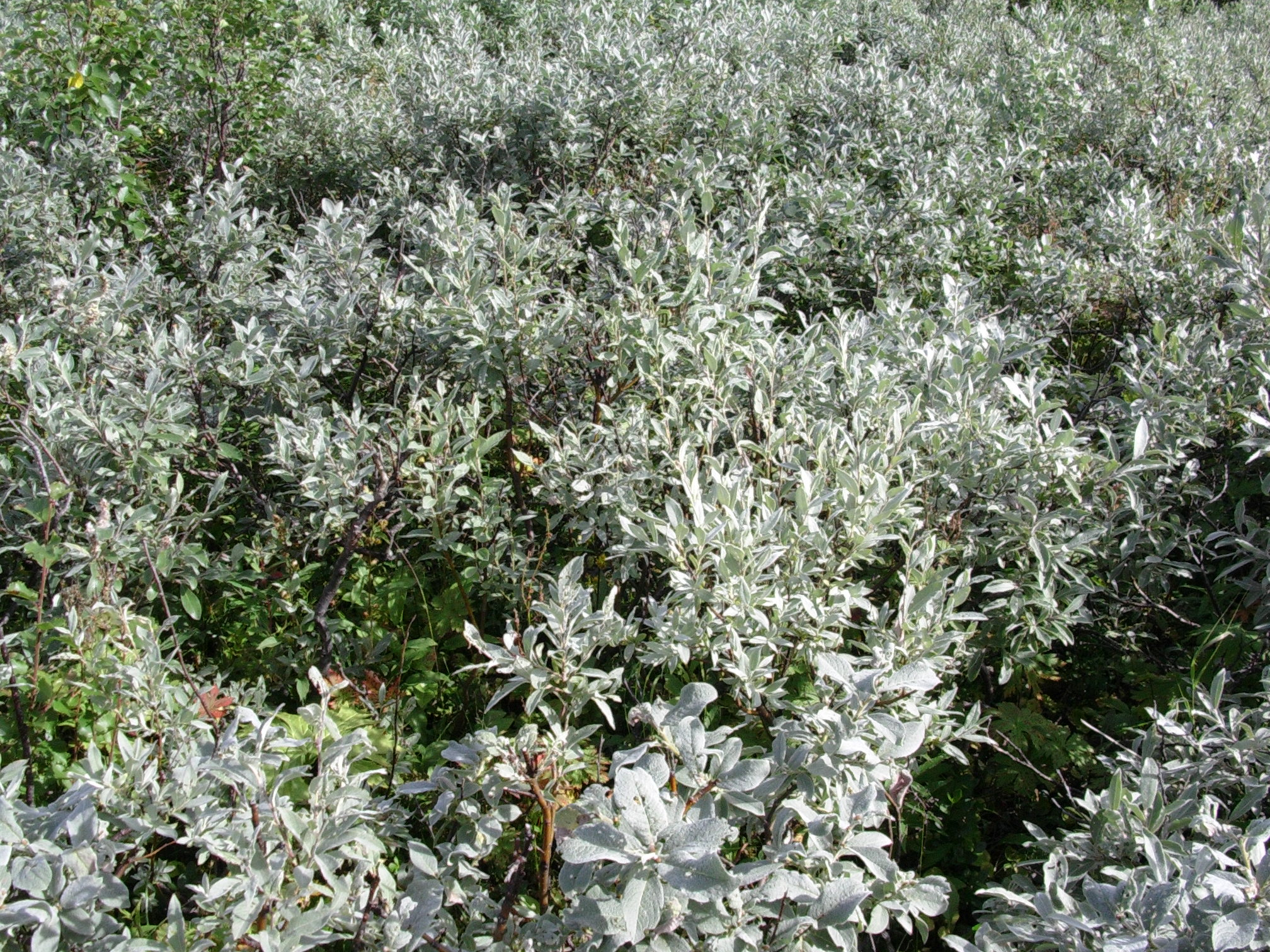
One third of the English population of Salix lapponum is found in Nethermost Cove.

The summit and surrounding areas of Nethermost Pike contain many species and communities which are of biological interest. North east of the summit is Nethermost Cove which contains some of England's best arctic-alpine and tall-herb vegetation, including one third of the English population of Downy Willow (Salix lapponum). Similarly Ruthwaite Cove contains Arctic-alpine and tall-herb communities, and it is believed that the cove may contain very rare species of plants in very small, and therefore precarious, populations. The lower eastern slopes form Grisedale Common, a large expanse of dwarf shrub heath. The lower slopes are grazed by sheep, which has a significant effect on the type of vegetation which grows. Certain areas, such as Eagle Crag, are inaccessible to sheep due to their steep slopes.

The summit and eastern slopes of Nethermost Pike are part of the Helvellyn and Fairfield Site of Special Scientific Interest (SSSI). This SSSI covers 2,418.8 hectares (5,977 acres) centred on the Helvellyn range and Fairfield, and was designated in 1975 because of the area's geological and biological features. Natural England, which is responsible for choosing SSSIs, tries to ensure that the management and use of the area is sustainable.

Overgrazing by sheep in Grisedale Common has damaged the vegetation to the extent that it has needed careful management. Since 2003 grazing has been limited to one ewe per hectare (2.5 acres) in summer and 0.6 ewe in winter. In summer sheep are also flushed from the coves, (Nethermost and Ruthwaite) as they contain vegetation which is susceptible to damage from summer grazing. The vegetation structure has started to improve; however, recovery is slowest on the higher land and the summit is still heavily grazed. The summit suffers erosion from the large number of walkers who climb Nethermost Pike. The use of fewer footpaths would help reduce the disturbance to the summit species.
