= Christie Park =

Christie Park can have the following meanings:

- Christie Park (Sydney, Australia), a sports ground in the Lower North Shore, Sydney, Australia
- Christie Park, Calgary, a neighbourhood in Calgary, Alberta, Canada
- Christie Park, Huntly, a football stadium in Huntly, Aberdeenshire, Scotland
- Christie Park (Morecambe), a stadium in Morecambe, Lancashire, England
