= Strathcona Park =

Strathcona Park can refer to:

== Parks ==
- Strathcona Provincial Park in British Columbia, Canada
- Strathcona Park in the West End, Kamloops, British Columbia, Canada
- Strathcona Park (Ottawa) in Ottawa, Canada

== Communities ==
- Strathcona Park, Calgary, a neighbourhood in Calgary, Canada

== See also ==
- Strathcona (disambiguation)
