= Strath =

Large valley

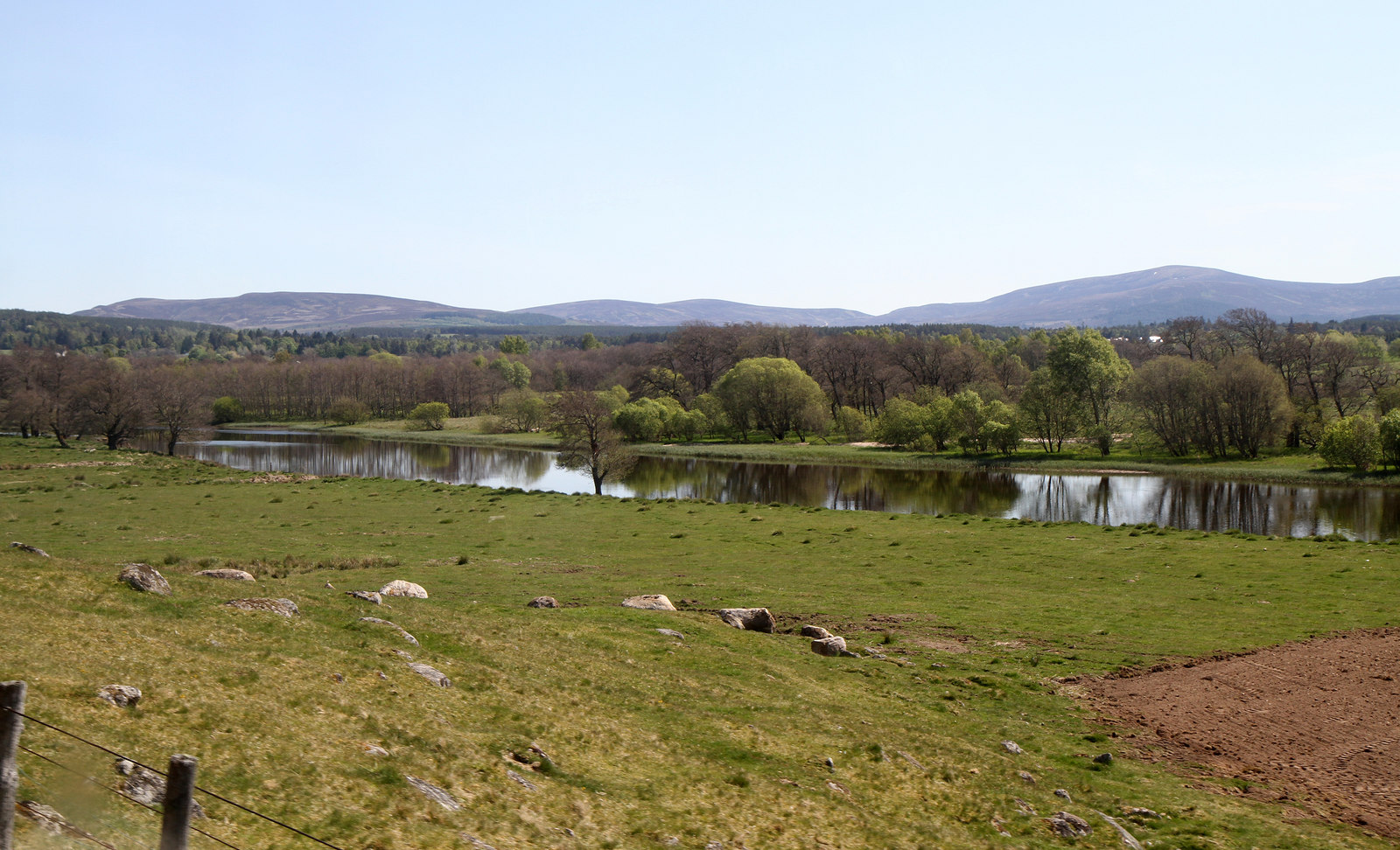
The River Spey flowing through Strathspey

A strath is a large valley, typically a river valley that is wide and shallow (as opposed to a glen, which is typically narrower and deep).

== Word and etymology ==
An anglicisation of the Gaelic word srath, it is one of many that have been absorbed into the English and Scots languages. It is commonly used in rural Scotland to describe a wide valley, even by non-Gaelic speakers.

In Scottish place-names, Strath- is of Gaelic and Brittonic origin. Strath- names have a similar origin to Gaelic srath, meaning "broad-valley", as well as to Cumbric and Pictish cognates (cf. Welsh ystrad).

Gaelic srath is derived from Old Irish srath, recorded as having meant "grassland". The modern Scottish Gaelic sense of "broad-valley", paralleling the meaning of Brittonic cognates, developed from substrate influence from Pictish.

== Toponymy ==
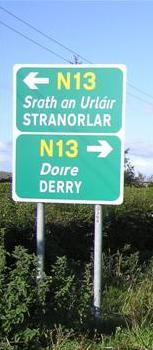
Sign for Stranorlar with Irish name Srath an Urláir, 'strath of the [valley] floor'.

It occurs in numerous place names within Scotland including Strathmore, Strathspey and Strathclyde. Abroad, many places with Scottish heritage also use the prefix, including Strath-Taieri in New Zealand; Strathalbyn in South Australia, Strathfield, a suburb of Sydney, Australia; Strathewen, Victoria, Australia; Strathpine, a suburb of Brisbane, Australia; and various places in Canada: Strathmore, Alberta; Strathcona; Strathroy, Ontario; and Strathburn, Ontario.

In Ireland, the same term is Anglicised as srah, stra-, strath or straw, as in Ardstraw, Stranorlar, Strathfoyle, Strabane.

It also occurs in the names of five P&O liners, four of which, the Strathaird, the Strathnaver, the Stratheden and the Strathmore, carried thousands of migrants to Australia between the 1950s and the 1960s. The ships acted as troop carriers during World War II and the fifth ship, the Strathallan, sank in the Mediterranean Sea in 1942 taking troops to the landings in North Africa.

The word is related to Welsh Ystrad, as in Strat Clut, the Old Welsh name for the Kingdom of Strathclyde.

In Keith there is a distillery producing the Strathisla whisky. It is a single malt whisky that is also an ingredient to the blend Chivas Regal.

== In geology ==
In geology, a strath is a bedrock surface within a river valley that marks a base level of erosion by the river. This may underlie a contemporary strath valley floor, corresponding to the present base level, but it may also correspond to a former base level now preserved in the geologic record.

When a river in a strath valley is rejuvenated by a drop in base level, remnants of the former valley floor may be preserved as strath terraces. These may record past climate oscillations or may be a result of river meandering.

If a change in sedimentation rates results in renewed deposition of sediments (aggradation) in a strath valley, the original strath surface may be buried under fresh sediments and become part of the geologic record. For example, at least three such straths are present in the valley of the Rio Grande River near Albuquerque, New Mexico.

== See also ==
- Annandale, Dumfries and Galloway
- Dale (place name element)
