= Dollywaggon Pike =

Mountain in the English Lake District, Cumbria, England

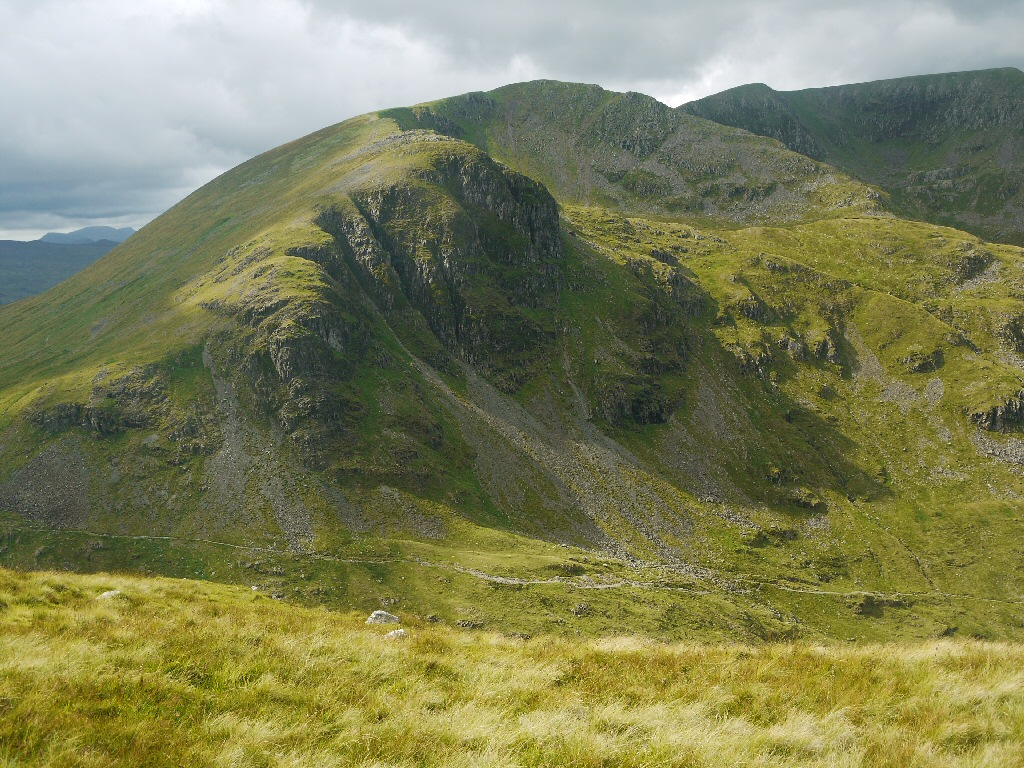
- Dollywaggon Pike, seen from Deepdale Hause

Highest point
- Elevation: 858 m (2,815 ft)
- Prominence: 50 m (164 ft)
- Parent peak: Helvellyn
- Listing: Hewitt, Nuttall, Wainwright
- Coordinates: 54°30′29″N 3°00′42″W

Geography
- Location within the Lake District Location within the former Allerdale Borough Location within the former Eden District
- Location: Cumbria, England
- Parent range: Lake District, Eastern Fells
- OS grid: NY346130
- Topo map: OS Landranger 90, Explorer OL5

Dollywaggon Pike is a fell in the English Lake District. It stands on the main spine of the Helvellyn range in the Eastern Fells, between Thirlmere and the Ullswater catchment.

== Toponymy ==
The spelling ‘Dollywaggon’ is used on Ordnance Survey 1:25,000 maps but ‘Dollywagon’ on 1:50,000 maps. The Ordnance Survey gazetteer, nominally based on the 1:50,000 maps, lists only ‘Dollywaggon Pike’. As of 2005, the ‘Dollywagon’ spelling is slightly more common in online references. Alfred Wainwright used ‘Dollywaggon Pike’ in his Pictorial Guide, a position supported by other writers. One meaning for the word Dollywaggon gives an Old Norse source formed by the combination of dolgr (‘fiend’ or ‘giant’) and veginn (‘lifted’).

== Topography ==
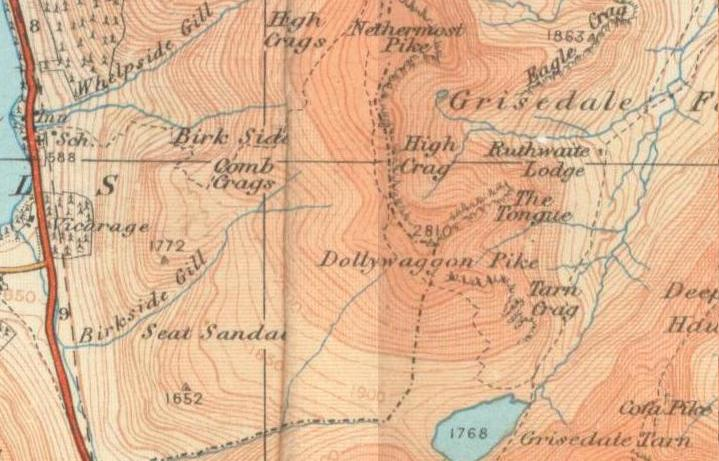
Map showing Dollywaggon Pike and surrounding features from 1925.

The Helvellyn range runs broadly north–south for about 7 miles (11 km), remaining above 2,000 feet (600 m) throughout its length. Dollywaggon Pike is the southernmost fell of the ridge proper, with Nethermost Pike immediately to the north. There is a subsidiary top between Nethermost and Dollywaggon Pikes named High Crag (2,990 feet, 910 m). Due to the very limited depression between the two, most guidebooks follow Wainwright in counting High Crag as a part of Nethermost Pike. To the south of Dollywaggon Pike is the complex depression containing Grisedale Tarn, with Seat Sandal and Fairfield rising beyond.

In common with much of the Helvellyn range there is a marked contrast between the western and eastern slopes of Dollywaggon Pike. In Wainwright’s words ‘To the west, uninteresting grass slopes descend to Dunmail Raise almost unrelieved by rock and scarred only by the wide stony track gouged across the breast of the fell by the boots of generations of pilgrims to Helvellyn. But the eastern side is a desolation of crag and boulder and scree.’

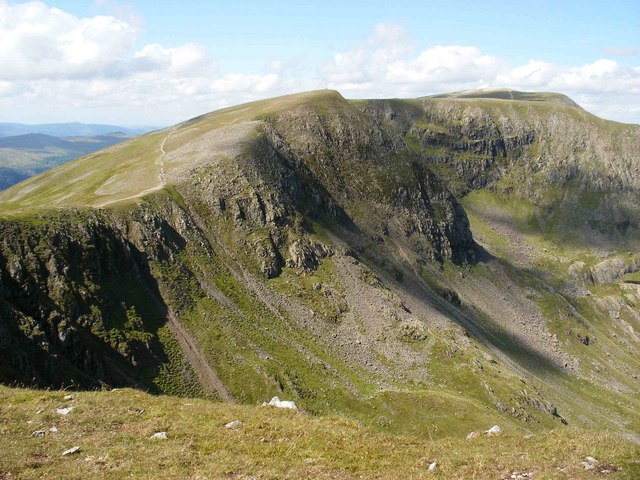
High Crag, often considered part of Nethermost Pike, seen from Dollywaggon Pike summit.

The western flank is named Willie Wife Moor for reasons lost to antiquity. It is bounded by Birkside Gill to the north and Raise Beck to the south, Reggle Knott being the only area of rough ground. At the base of the slope Raise Beck flows north to Thirlmere, having been diverted as a part of the 1884 reservoir project. It previously turned south down the other side of Dunmail Raise pass to feed Grasmere. Before this diversion, Dollywaggon Pike was distinctive in that its drainage reached the sea at more widely spread points than any other Lakeland Fell, with Raise Beck going through Grasmere and Windermere to reach Morecambe Bay, Birkside Gill going through Thirlmere and Derwent Water to reach the Irish Sea at Workington and Grisedale Beck draining into Ullswater and then to the sea at the Solway Firth. This is still the case today when there is enough water in Raise Beck for it to flow both north and south, but normally Seat Sandal now has this distinction.

Birkside Gill contains the remains of a number of levels driven for copper between 1840 and 1866.

On the east, the first impression is all of rock. The long strath of Grisedale runs north-eastward to Ullswater, cutting off a series of hanging valleys which fall from the Helvellyn range. To the north-east of Dollywaggon Pike, below the summit of High Crag, is Ruthwaite Cove, a corrie surrounded on three sides by crag. Ruthwaite Cove is now the site of Ruthwaite Lodge, a climbing hut. It was formerly the setting for more industrious activity, with the remains of several levels and some shallow open mineworking being visible near the Lodge. These excavations were made for lead-bearing galena, and are believed to have been worked in the sixteenth century. Further leases were taken out in 1784 and 1862, the last-known operation being in 1880. To the east of Dollywaggon Pike is a second corrie, Cock Cove, with Falcon Crag and the deeply gullied Tarn Crag providing the impressive headwall.

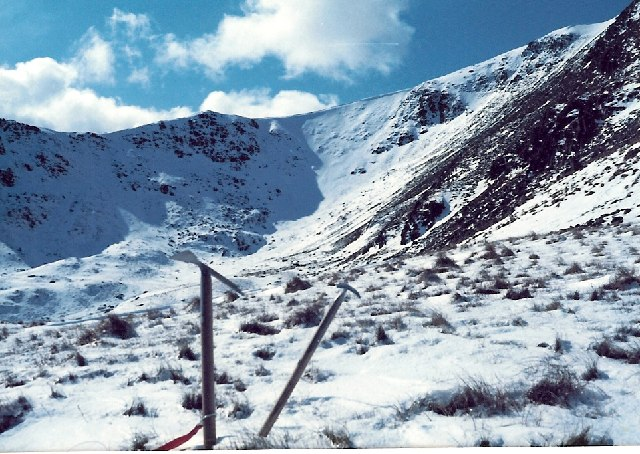
Cock Cove seen from The Tongue on Dollywaggon Pike.

Between the two coves, Dollywaggon Pike sends out a fine rocky ridge, The Tongue. This arête ascends by a series of rocky steps making straight for the summit. At the bottom of The Tongue is Spout Crag, standing above Grisedale Beck and forcing walkers to take a detour from the ridgeline.

North of Dollywaggon Pike the ridge narrows and then steps up over High Crag to the plateau top of Nethermost Pike. In the other direction the high ground curves south-east around Cock Cove before a long slope falls to Grisedale Tarn at around 1,770 feet (540 m). This sizeable tarn has a depth of around 110 feet (34 m) and holds brown trout, perch and eels. The outflow is to Ullswater to the north east, picking up all of the rainfall from the eastern face of Dollywaggon Pike. To the west of the tarn is the unnamed col between Dollywaggon Pike and Seat Sandal and immediately to the south is Grisedale Hause, the depression between Seat Sandal and Fairfield. Thus Seat Sandal stands topographically on the ridge between the two higher fells, but so out on a limb that many walkers proceed directly from Dollywaggon Pike to Fairfield.

== Geology ==
Geologically the summit of the fell forms part of the Deepdale Formation, (principally volcaniclastic sandstone) underlain by the dacitic lapilli tuff of the Helvellyn Formation.

== Summit ==
The summit is a small grassy rise directly at the head of The Tongue. It carries a small cairn with a larger one a few yards to the west. The view is extensive with the eastern foreground particularly fine

== Ascents ==
The Tongue provides a fine route of ascent, though a long one, from Patterdale and the fell can also be reached from the Grasmere area via Grisedale Tarn. Ascents up the western slopes are unimpeded but uninteresting.
