= Fergus Graham =

Sir Frederick Fergus Graham Bt KBE TD

Lord Lieutenant of Cumberland
- In office 1958–1968
- Preceded by: Sir Robert Christopher Chance
- Succeeded by: John Charles Wade

Member of Parliament for Darlington
- In office 1951–1959
- Preceded by: David Hardman
- Succeeded by: Anthony Bourne-Arton

Member of Parliament for North Cumberland
- In office 1926–1935
- Preceded by: Donald Howard
- Succeeded by: Wilfrid Roberts

Personal details
- Born: Frederick Fergus Graham; 10 March 1893
- Died: 1 August 1978 (aged 85)
- Party: Conservative
- Spouse: Mary Spencer Revell Reade (after 1918)
- Children: 2
- Parent(s): Sir Richard Graham, 4th Baronet; Lady Mabel Cynthia Duncombe
- Education: Eton College
- Alma mater: Christ Church, Oxford

Sir Frederick Fergus Graham, 5th Baronet KBE TD (10 March 1893 – 1 August 1978) was a Conservative Party politician in the United Kingdom.

== Early life ==
Graham was a "member of one of the most distinguished Border families". He was the son of Sir Richard James Graham, 4th Baronet, and Lady Mabel Cynthia Duncombe, who were first cousins. His younger siblings included Richard Graham-Vivian (who married Audrey Emily Vivian, daughter of Maj. Henry Wyndham Vivian) and Daphne Graham (who married Sir Kenneth Barnes).

His maternal grandparents were William Duncombe, 1st Earl of Feversham and Mabel Violet Graham. His paternal grandparents were Sir Frederick Graham, 3rd Baronet and Lady Jane Hermione Stewart (a daughter of Edward Seymour, 12th Duke of Somerset). His paternal grandfather and maternal grandmother were siblings, both children of the prominent British statesman Sir James Graham, 2nd Baronet, who served as First Lord of the Admiralty and Home Secretary.

He was educated at Eton College and Christ Church, Oxford.

== Career ==
Graham served from 1914 to 1918 during the Great War as Captain of the Irish Guards, where he was severely wounded, and mentioned in despatches, "leading a charge at Givenchy in February, 1915." After he recovery, he served as aide-de-camp to his father-in-law, Gen. Reade and, later, to Gen. Fielding. "After the War he returned to Oxford and took a course in agriculture" and became a tenant farmer in North Cumberland.

He was first elected to the House of Commons at a by-election in 1926 in the North Cumberland constituency. The sitting Conservative Member of Parliament (MP) Donald Howard had succeeded to the peerage as Baron Strathcona and Mount Royal, and Graham held the seat comfortably. He represented the constituency for nine years, until his defeat at the 1935 general election by the Liberal candidate Wilfrid Roberts.

Graham returned to Parliament at the 1951 general election, when he was elected as MP for Darlington, defeating the sitting Labour MP David Hardman. Graham held his seat until he retired at the 1959 general election.

In 1932, he succeeded his father to the baronetcy, becoming the 5th Baronet Graham, of Netherby. He was Lord Lieutenant of Cumberland from 1958 to 1968. During the 1930s Graham's wife supported the local branch of the NSPCC.

== Personal life ==
In 1918 he married Mary Spencer Revell Reade, the only child of Major-General Raymond Northland Revell Reade and Rose Frances Spence. They had two children, one son and one daughter:

- Major Sir Charles Spencer Richard Graham, 6th Baronet (1919–1997), who married Isabel Susan Anne Surtees, daughter of Maj. Robert Lambton Surtees.
- Cynthia Mary Graham (1923–1927), who died young.

Sir Fergus died on 1 August 1978 and was succeeded in the baronetcy by his only son Charles.

Parliament of the United Kingdom
Preceded by Donald Howard	Member of Parliament for North Cumberland; 1926–1935	Succeeded by Wilfrid Roberts
Preceded by David Hardman	Member of Parliament for Darlington; 1951–1959	Succeeded by Anthony Bourne-Arton
Honorary titles
Preceded by Sir Robert Christopher Chance	Lord Lieutenant of Cumberland; 1958–1968	Succeeded by John Charles Wade
Baronetage of Great Britain
Preceded by Richard Graham	Baronet (of Netherby); 1932–1978	Succeeded by Charles Graham
