= High Crag (Helvellyn) =

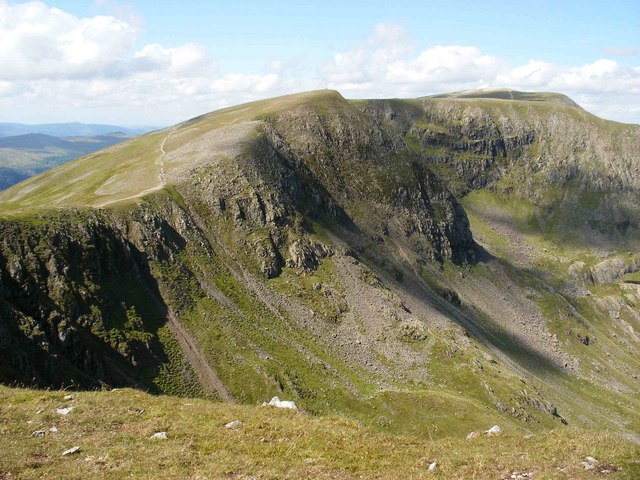
- High Crag seen from Dollywaggon Pike, with Nethermost Pike beyond

Highest point
- Elevation: 884 m (2,900 ft)
- Prominence: 13 m (43 ft)
- Parent peak: Nethermost Pike
- Listing: Birkett
- Coordinates: 54°30′50″N 3°00′57″W

Geography
- Location within the Lake District
- Location: Cumbria, England
- Parent range: Lake District, Eastern Fells
- OS grid: NY343136
- Topo map: OS Landranger 90, Explorer OL5/OL4

High Crag is a minor fell on the Helvellyn Range in the eastern region of the English Lake District. It sits on the ridge to the south of Helvellyn and Nethermost Pike. It rises sharply above the head of Ruthwaite Cove, and has attracted the attention of rock climbers. Its rock type is a lapilli tuff of the Helvellyn Tuff Formation.

== Topography ==
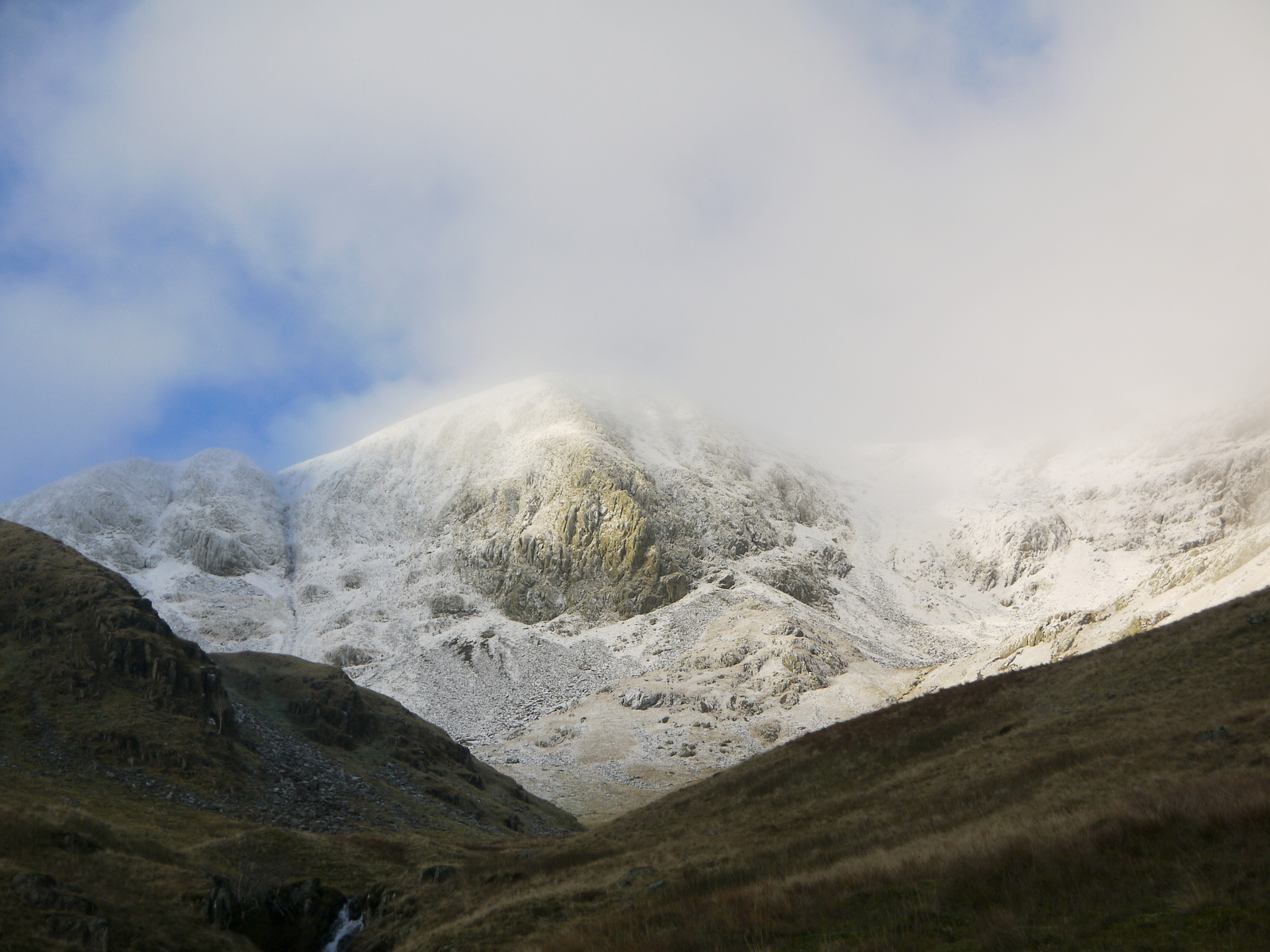
High Crag seen from Ruthwaite Cove

High Crag is a rocky crag, over 100 m high, which rises abruptly above the head of Ruthwaite Cove (/ˈrʌθət/) and which forms a minor fell on the south ridge of Nethermost Pike, at a point some 350 m north of the col between that mountain and Dollywaggon Pike.

A cairn marks the summit, which is 884 m high and has a prominence of 13 m from the ridge. To the west the ground slopes gradually away from the summit, merging with the western slope of Nethermost Pike.

== Routes ==
Walkers may reach the summit of High Crag by taking a short diversion from the ridge path. Small paths lead to and from the summit cairn, but are much less worn than the path that bypasses it, only 60 m from the cairn.

For climbers, two gullies and a buttress lead up the steep eastern face of High Crag.

== Summit ==
The flat summit of High Crag is marked by a cairn which is visible from the neighbouring tops.

The summit is a high perch from which there is a bird's-eye view down into Ruthwaite Cove, flanked by the two eastern ridges of Nethermost Pike and Dollywaggon Pike, and with its tiny tarn, Hard Tarn. Then the view goes on down Grisedale to Ullswater and Place Fell, with the Pennine Hills in the distance.

== Geology ==
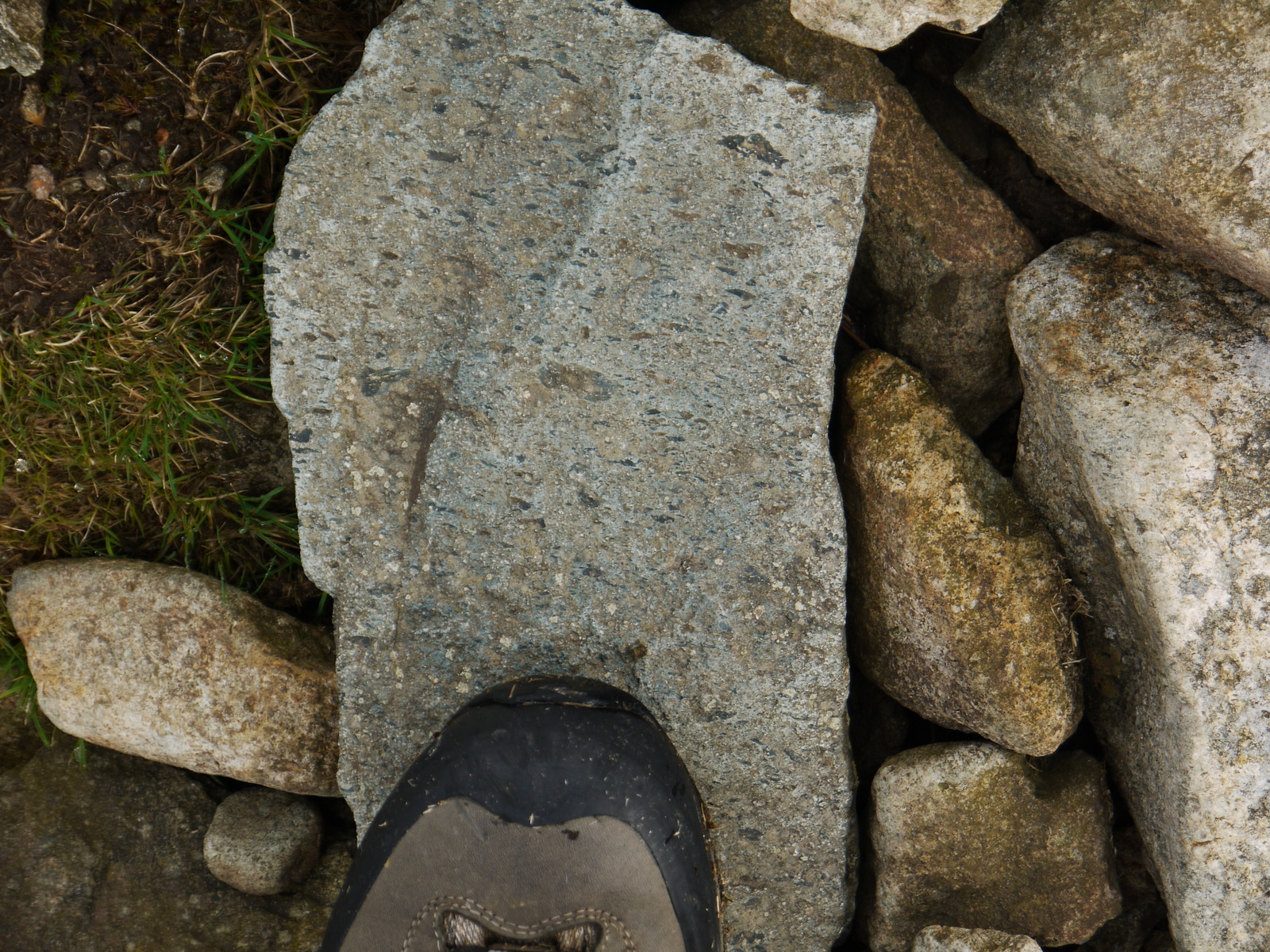
Piece of lapilli-tuff of the Helvellyn Tuff Formation, found on High Crag

High Crag is composed entirely of lapilli tuff of the Helvellyn Tuff Formation. This formation is part of the Borrowdale Volcanic Group, formed during a period of intense volcanic activity on the edge of an ancient continent during the Ordovician Period, about 450 million years ago. The Helvellyn Tuff Formation was formed by an explosive volcanic eruption which produced a large-volume pyroclastic flow of very hot gas and rock. Individual lapilli or pieces of semi-molten lava within the flow were flattened by the weight of deposits above them.

== Image gallery ==
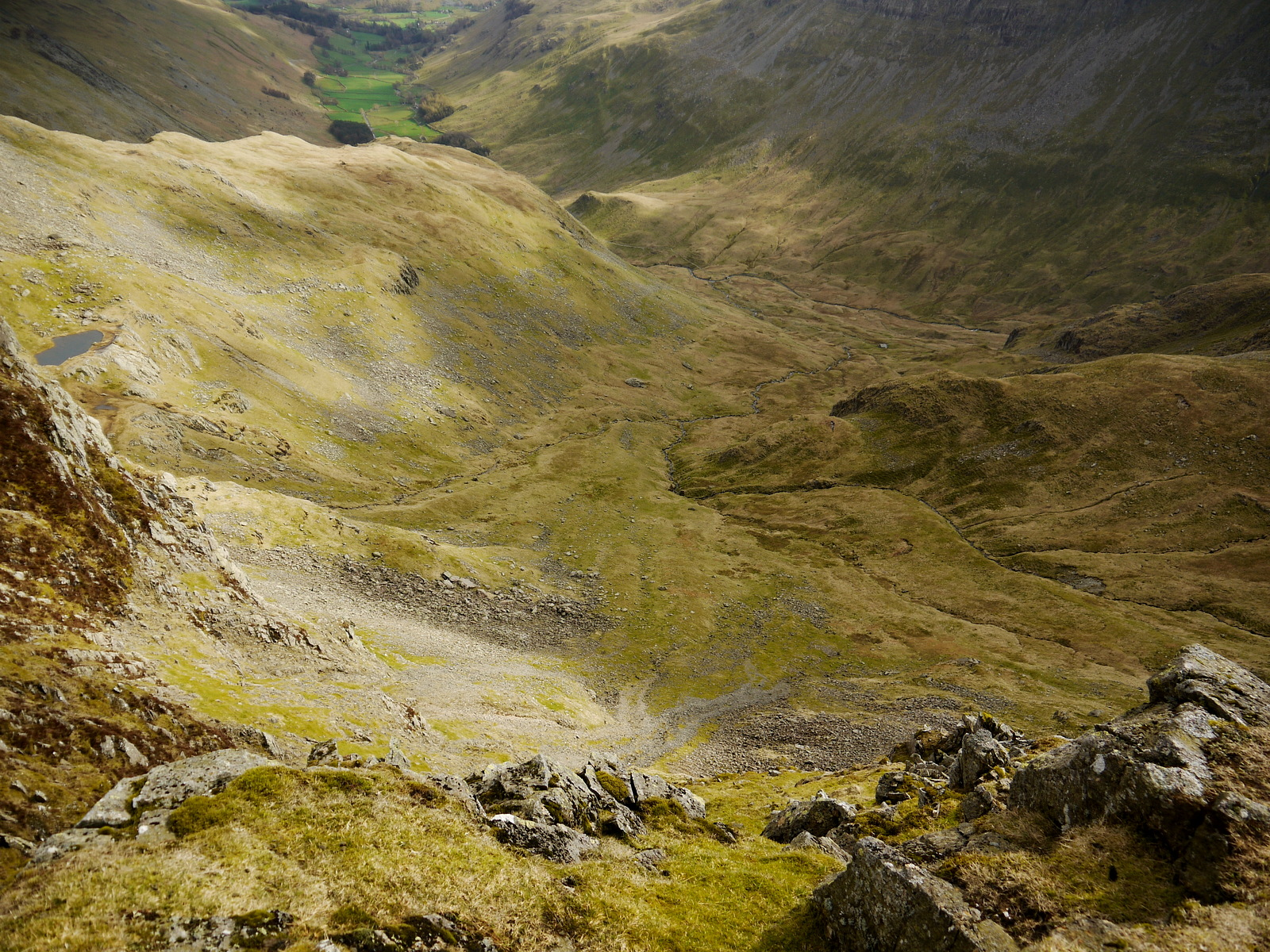
Looking down into Ruthwaite Cove from High Crag

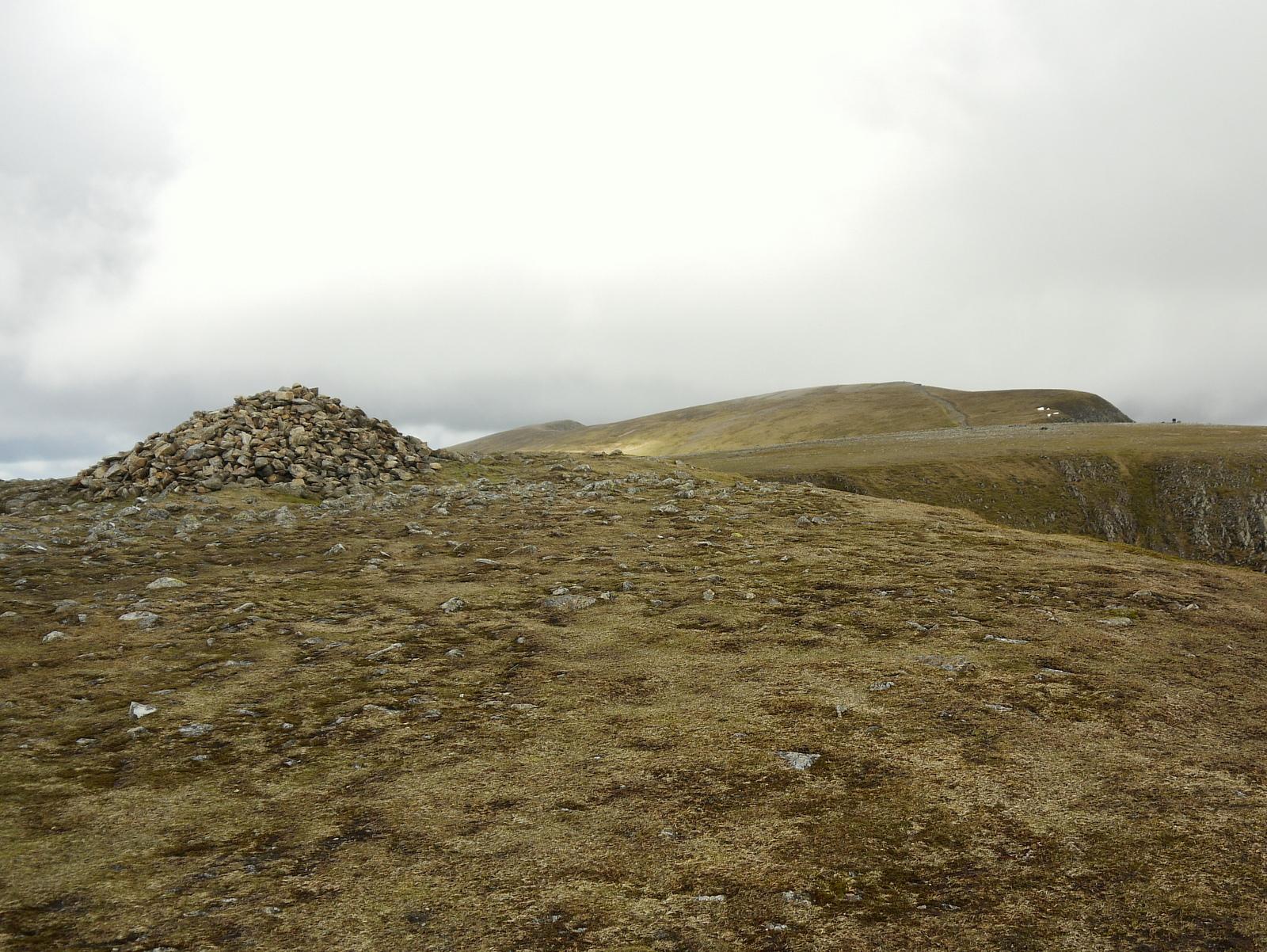
Summit cairn on High Crag, with Helvellyn seen beyond
