= Wilfrid Roberts =

British politician

Member of Parliament for North Cumberland
- In office 1935-1950

Personal details
- Born: 28 August 1900 York, England
- Died: 26 May 1991 (aged 90)
- Party: Liberal; Labour
- Spouse(s): Margaret Jennings (m. 1923; died 1924) Anne Jennings (m. 1928; div. 1957) Kate Sawyer
- Children: 3
- Parent: Charles Henry Roberts (father)
- Relatives: Winifred Nicholson (sister); George Howard (grandfather)
- Education: Balliol College, Oxford

Wilfrid Hubert Wace Roberts (28 August 1900 – 26 May 1991) was a radical British Liberal Party politician who later joined the Labour Party.

== Personal life ==
Roberts was born in York to Charles Henry Roberts, who became Liberal MP for Lincoln, and Lady Cecilia Maude Roberts, daughter of the 9th Earl of Carlisle; the artist Winifred Nicholson was his elder sister. He was educated at Gresham's School, Holt, Norfolk, and Balliol College, Oxford.

A farmer, Roberts in 1934 and 1935 broadcast two series of talks, Living in Cumberland, on the BBC Home Service. He commissioned Leslie Martin to work on Banks House, near Brampton, Cumberland, in 1937. From September 1943 A. J. Ayer was a lodger in his flat near the House of Commons. Ayer had not previously known Roberts, and described him as "very tall, unmistakably English, quiet, with an undercurrent of strong feeling, cultivated and philanthropic."

Roberts was also the owner of the Carlisle Journal newspaper, which ceased publication in 1969. He served as a Justice of the peace.

== Political career ==
Roberts's first political involvement came as a district councillor. He described the tradition of Cumbrian local politics in an interview with Hunter Davies for A Walk Along the Wall (1974):

There's always been a branch of the Howard family which has been radical. In this area three families have been running things for decades, the Howards, the Grahams of Netherby, and the Lowthers. I've tried to keep the anti-Tory tradition alive, fighting our traditional Tory rival families, the Lowthers and the Grahams.

=== Election as Member of Parliament ===
Roberts first stood for parliament, without success, for North Cumberland in 1931, losing by 1,277 votes.

General election 27 October 1931: Cumberland North
Party	Candidate	Votes	%	±%
Conservative	Frederick Fergus Graham	12,504	52.7	
Liberal	Wilfrid Hubert Wace Roberts	11,277	47.3	
Majority		1,277	5.4	
Turnout			84.6	
Conservative hold		Swing		

Roberts became a Member of Parliament (MP) for North Cumberland at the 1935 election, gaining the seat from the Conservatives. The Labour Party did not contest the seat, a tribute to his existing reputation as a radical.

General election 14 November 1935: Cumberland North
Party	Candidate	Votes	%	±%
Liberal	Wilfrid Hubert Wace Roberts	12,521	51.9	+4.6
Conservative	Sir Frederick Fergus Graham	11,627	48.1	−4.6
Majority		894	3.8	9.2
Turnout			83.9	−0.7
Liberal gain from Conservative		Swing	+4.6	

Sir Archibald Sinclair, the Liberal leader, appointed Roberts an Assistant Whip in the House of Commons, working under the Chief Whip Sir Percy Harris. Following on from his BBC talks on Living in Cumberland, Roberts was chosen by the BBC as one of their regular speakers on The Week at Westminster. An internal BBC memo in 1939 described Roberts as having a "pleasant manner".

In June and July 1936, Dudley Aman, 1st Baron Marley and Roberts were in Budapest, negotiating on behalf of Mátyás Rákosi.

=== Spanish Civil War ===
At the time of the Spanish Civil War, Roberts was nicknamed "MP for Spain". He led a delegation of six Members of Parliament to Republican Spain in November 1936.

Roberts was Secretary of the National Joint Committee for Spanish Relief, the formation of which from the Parliamentary Committee for Spain he proposed. He worked with Conservative MP Katharine Stewart-Murray, Duchess of Atholl, as Chair, David Grenfell of the Labour Party, and Eleanor Rathbone the Independent MP, from 1937 to 1940.

With the Conservative MP John Macnamara, Roberts was also joint secretary of the Basque Children's Committee. He worked in the relief effort for Basque refugees, with Christopher Hill as one of his colleagues. The initial reception camp for Basque children was at Stoneham in Hampshire, and was organised by Roberts and Henry Brinton, in response to the relief efforts of Leah Manning in May 1937 at Bilbao. In June Roberts announced with the Countess of Atholl that over 1000 children had been moved from the camp to Catholic homes.

=== Popular Front ===
Roberts was a supporter of the Popular Front seeking an alliance between left-of-centre political forces. The Popular Front was not officially endorsed by the Liberal Party, but was supported by a number of other Liberal MPs such as Megan Lloyd George and Richard Acland. Roberts spoke at the 1938 Emergency Conference for a Popular Front. He was embarrassed and angry, however, when he was chairing the Spain Conference in the Queen's Hall, and the "Internationale" was sung. At this period he was an active speaker for the Left Book Club (LBC), a publishing company founded in 1936, with Acland.

The Popular Front gained additional credibility when it was advocated by Sir Stafford Cripps. Both Roberts and Acland were counted by Cripps in "The Group", his cadre of supporters gathered after he was expelled from the Labour Party in early 1939. The LBC organisation had grown to the point that it held public meetings and rallies. John Strachey in late 1938 saw the move by which Acland, Cripps and Roberts were proposed as additions to the LBC book selection committee as the beginning of an "Anti-Fascist Association". As an LBC speaker, Roberts was in a Popular Front group prepared to share platforms, with Acland, Sir Norman Angell, Cripps, David Lloyd George, Hewlett Johnson, Harry Pollitt, Paul Robeson and Strachey. He spoke with most of them on 24 April 1939, at the Empress Hall, Earl's Court, for the third annual LBC rally.

=== Second World War ===
At the outbreak of the Second World War, Roberts was commissioned into the Border Regiment. He returned to politics, however, and in 1941 was in the Air Ministry. There he served as Parliamentary Private Secretary (PPS) to the Liberal Leader, Sir Archibald Sinclair, who at the time was Secretary of State for Air in the Coalition Government.

==== 1941 ====
In November 1941 Lancelot Spicer founded the "Liberal Action Group" or "Radical Action", a pressure group inside the Liberal Party. It lobbied for the party to withdraw from the wartime electoral truce and sought to rally progressive opinion irrespective of party. Roberts was a founding member of the group, along with Megan Lloyd George, Thomas Horabin, Clement Davies, Vernon Bartlett, and William Beveridge.

Roberts tried to re-energise the Liberal Party machine during the war years. He became Chairman of the Organising Committee of the party. The party headquarters moved back into central London in December 1941, and he worked to reconstruct Liberal organisations.

At the end of 1941 a group consisting of the Conservative Herbert Williams, Clement Davies, and Roberts began pressing for a reorganised government. Davies attacked Winston Churchill's running of the War Cabinet. Churchill brushed Davies aside, but Roberts backed him in a public speech. His position as PPS to Sinclair made this an awkward situation, and Sinclair made an offer to Churchill to sack him. Churchill turned it down, but said Sinclair should "teach him how to spell".

==== 1942 ====
This year saw open discontent with Winston Churchill's leadership, involving some Conservatives. James Chuter Ede observed mealtime meetings in the House, on 21 January seeing Roberts sitting with Tories (Charles Emmott, Arthur Evans), and a group from other parties.

Roberts on 26 March opened the "Freedom of the Press" debate caused by a Philip Zec cartoon in the Daily Mirror, aimed at the Battle of the Atlantic, and called "wicked" by Herbert Morrison. He argued that the cartoon's target was the "wasters of oil". According to Maurice Edelman, Roberts was an "uninspiring speaker" who had difficulty holding an audience in the Commons, but on this occasion rumour had it that the government sought a "showdown" with the Mirror, through Morrison and Brendan Bracken, and the House filled. Roberts finished with a quote from Bracken on "blindfold democracy". Sir Irving Albery followed, in sympathy with the argument. Hugh Cudlipp wrote later that Defence Regulation 2D, which Morrison had applied in the past, was "a version of the stocks", and his account of the debate was that Roberts led Liberals and Socialists against Morrison, who "suffered" at the hands of Aneurin Bevan and Fred Bellenger, who quoted back at Morrison something he had written as a pacifist of World War I. Edelman points out that Ellen Wilkinson supported Morrison. The outcome that the government made no further efforts to silence the Mirror as critic.

On 19 May, Chuter Ede observed, at a "Liberal table" with Roberts the sole Liberal, there were a diverse group: Evans and Reginald Clarry (Conservatives), Alexander Erskine-Hill (Scottish Unionist), Geoffrey Shakespeare (National Liberal) and Bevan (Labour). Percy Harris with difficulty sat down. Chuter Ede considered it a "Cave of Adullam".

From mid-1942 Roberts was chair of the Food and Agriculture subcommittee of the Liberals' Reconstruction Committee. Later in 1942 he was behind moves to get the annual Liberal Party Assembly in August to debate a series of progressive social policies. Lord Meston let it be known that he thought potential supporters who were businessmen might be lost to the party.

In September 1942 MI5 paid some attention to Roberts, as reported in Guy Liddell's diaries (23 September). Claud Cockburn was using a small group of contacts to research stories for his scandal sheet, This Week, in an effort to embarrass the government. Derek Tangye, then a journalist, was included, as were Roberts and Douglas Hyde: but covertly Tangye was working for MI5.

==== 1943 ====
The Beveridge Report was published in November 1942. in which Beveridge outlined his programme for social reform. Following its publication, Roberts declared himself a supporter of the proposals. At a 1943 Liberal conference, he told the gathering "We must plan our economic system to make the very best use of all our resources".

In August 1943 Roberts was part of a delegation of senior Liberal party members who met with leaders of the Liberal Nationals to discuss the possibility of merger. The discussions came to nothing. In 1944 he urged his party leader Sinclair to agree to take part in a series of public meetings, advancing Liberal party policy. Sinclair declined, commenting that the other party leaders, Churchill and Attlee, were not doing so.

In his diary entry for 29 November 1943, Guy Liddell recorded another MI5 investigation of Roberts, It concerned leaked documents, passed to Roberts to form the basis of a parliamentary question, in concert with the Evening Standard.

==== 1945 ====
In 1945 Roberts went on a mission to Moscow, to meet Stalin, and published a pamphlet in April of that year with his views of the USSR. He was re-elected to parliament in the 1945 general election.

General election 1945: Cumberland North
Party	Candidate	Votes	%	±%
Liberal	Wilfrid Hubert Wace Roberts	12,053	50.4	−1.5
Conservative	Ronald Nicholson Carr	11,855	49.6	+1.5
Majority		198	0.83	−3.0
Turnout			75.7	
Liberal hold		Swing	-1.5	

=== Post-war period ===
After the war Roberts became chairman of the House of Commons Estimates sub-committee. He went on the mission to China led by Charles Ammon, 1st Baron Ammon. On 19 April 1949 he opened an attack on the Labour government over the Amethyst Incident, stating that it would be better to improve relations with the Chinese Communist Party. His suggestion was supported by Woodrow Wyatt, then rejected by Walter Fletcher.

At the 1950 general election, following boundary changes, he contested the re-drawn seat of Penrith and the Border but lost to the Conservative. In the three previous elections, Labour had not opposed him but, in 1950, they intervened and cost him his seat.

General election 1950: Penrith and The Border
Party	Candidate	Votes	%	±%
Conservative	Robert Donald Scott	21,214	48.23	n/a
Liberal	Wilfrid Hugh Wace Roberts	12,333	28.04	n/a
Labour	Cecil John Taylor	10,441	23.74	n/a
Majority		8,881	20.19	n/a
Turnout			85.26	n/a
Conservative win (new seat)				

In July 1956 Roberts joined the Labour Party and at the 1959 election fought Hexham as a Labour candidate without success.

General election 1959: Hexham
Party	Candidate	Votes	%	±%
Conservative	Rupert Malise Speir	25,500	62.99	
Labour	Wilfrid Hubert Wace Roberts	14,980	37.01	
Majority		10,520	25.99	
Turnout			81.11	
Conservative hold		Swing		

He was elected as a Labour councillor in Carlisle.

== Family ==
Roberts was married three times. Firstly, in 1923, to Margaret Jennings, who died in 1924, shortly after the birth of a daughter; secondly, in 1928, to Anne Constance Davis Jennings, with whom he had two further daughters, the marriage ending in divorce in 1957; and thirdly, to Kate Sawyer. His first two wives were sisters, daughters of James George Jennings of Muir Central College.

Parliament of the United Kingdom
Preceded by Fergus Graham	Member of Parliament for North Cumberland; 1935–1950	constituency abolished
