= Christie Park, Calgary =

Christie Park
- Neighbourhood
- Location of Christie Park in Calgary
- Coordinates: 51°02′22″N 114°10′36″W
- Country: Canada
- Province: Alberta
- City: Calgary
- Quadrant: SW
- Ward: 6
- Established: 1990
- Annexed: 1956

Government
  - Mayor: Jeromy Farkas
  - Administrative body: Calgary City Council
  - Councillor: John Pantazopoulos (Independent)

Area
  - Total: 1.1 km^{2} (0.42 sq mi)
- Elevation: 1,210 m (3,970 ft)

Population (2006)
  - Total: 2,205
  - Average Income: $102,664
- Postal code: T3H
- Website: Christie Park Community Association

Christie Park is a residential neighbourhood in the southwest quadrant of Calgary, Alberta. It is bounded by Strathcona Drive and the community of Strathcona Park to the north, Sarcee Trail to the east, 17 Avenue S to the south and 69 Street W to the west.

The land was annexed to the City of Calgary in 1956 from the Municipal District of Rocky View. Christie Park was established as a neighbourhood in 1990. It is represented in the Calgary City Council by the Ward 6 councillor.

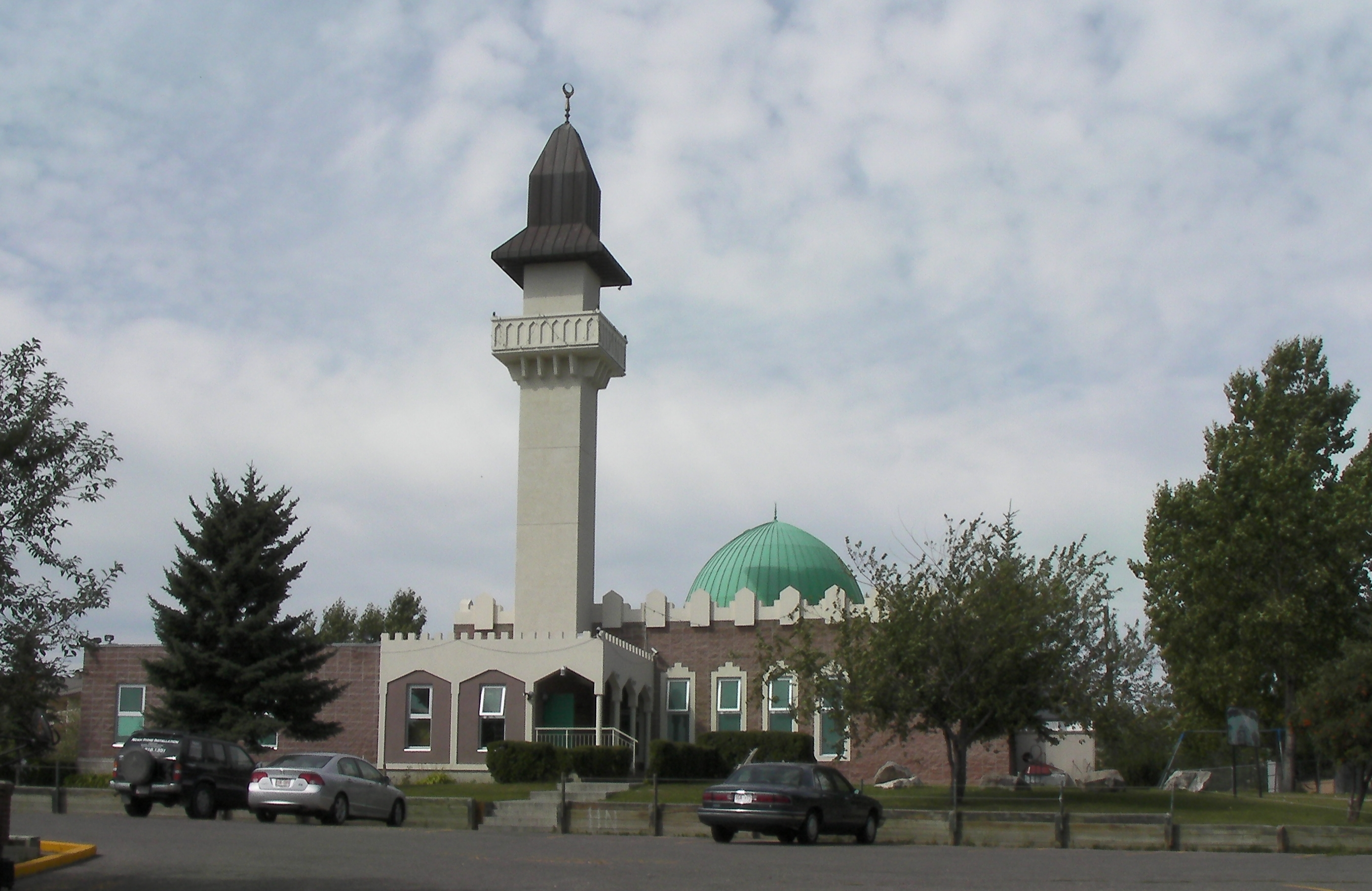
Calgary Islamic Centre in Christie Park

== Demographics ==
In the City of Calgary's 2012 municipal census, Christie Park had a population of 2,196 living in 728 dwellings, a 0.7% increase from its 2011 population of 2,180. With a land area of 0.8 km^{2} (0.31 sq mi), it had a population density of 2,750/km^{2} (7,100/sq mi) in 2012.

Residents in this community had a median household income of $102,664 in 2000, and there were 8.4% low income residents living in the neighbourhood. As of 2000, 19.2% of the residents were immigrants. A proportion of 5.5% of the buildings were condominiums or apartments, and 4.8% of the housing was used for renting.

== Education ==
The community is served by Olympic Heights Elementary public school.

== See also ==
- List of neighbourhoods in Calgary
