= Euan Howard, 4th Baron Strathcona and Mount Royal =

British Conservative politician and peer (1923–2018)

Donald Euan Palmer Howard, 4th Baron Strathcona and Mount Royal, DL (26 November 1923 – 16 June 2018) was a British Conservative politician.

== Biography ==
Lord Strathcona was the eldest son of The 3rd Baron Strathcona and Mount Royal and his wife, The Hon. Diana Evelyn Loder, daughter of The 1st Baron Wakehurst. He was educated at King's Mead, Seaford, Eton College, Trinity College, Cambridge, and McGill University, Montreal. He served in the Royal Navy from 1942 to 1947, achieving the rank of Lieutenant.

He succeeded his father in the barony in 1959 and took his seat on the Conservative benches in the House of Lords. He served under Edward Heath as a Lord-in-Waiting (government whip in the House of Lords) from June 1973 to January 1974, and briefly as Under-Secretary of State for the Air Force from January to March 1974. After the Conservatives lost power in March 1974 he was Joint Deputy Leader of the Opposition in the House of Lords between 1976 and 1979. When the Conservatives returned to office in May 1979 under Margaret Thatcher, he was appointed Minister of State at the Ministry of Defence, a post he held until 1981. He lost his seat in the House of Lords after the passing of the House of Lords Act 1999.

== Marriages and issue ==
Strathcona married firstly Lady Jane Mary Waldegrave, daughter of The 12th Earl Waldegrave, in 1954. They had two sons and four daughters:

- Hon Jane Elizabeth Stirling Howard (born 23 January 1955)
- Hon Katharine Mary Howard (born 11 September 1956)
- Hon Caroline Anne Howard (born 30 March 1959)
- Donald Alexander Euan Howard (born 24 June 1961), 5th Baron Strathcona and Mount Royal
- Hon Andrew Howard (born 17 August 1963)
- Hon Emma Laura Louise Howard (born 17 August 1963)

The marriage ended in divorce in June 1977. Strathcona married secondly Patricia (née Thomas), widow of John Middleton, in February 1978.

He was succeeded to the barony by his eldest son, Donald Alexander Euan Howard, in 2018.

== See also ==
- Canadian Hereditary Peers

Peerage of the United Kingdom
| Preceded by Donald Stirling Palmer Howard | Baron Strathcona and Mount Royal; 1959–2018 | Succeeded by Donald Alexander Euan Howard |
