= 1926 North Cumberland by-election =

UK parliamentary by-election

The 1926 North Cumberland by-election was held on 17 September 1926. The by-election was held due to the succession to the peerage of the incumbent Conservative MP, Donald Howard. It was won by the Conservative candidate Fergus Graham.

== Vacancy ==
The by-election was held due to the succession to the peerage of the incumbent Unionist MP, Donald Howard. He had been MP here since winning the seat in 1922.

== Election history ==
Cumberland North was created for the 1918 general election. At that election, the Unionist candidate, endorsed by the Coalition Government, was returned unopposed. The first actual electoral contest occurred in 1922 when Howard narrowly held the seat for the Unionists, in a 2-way contest with the Liberal. At the 1923 general election, Howard again narrowly held off the new Liberal challenger, R.D. Holt. At the 1924 general election, a Labour Party candidate intervened for the first time. This damaged Holt's prospects and Howard was easily re-elected;

R.D. Holt

1924 general election: North Cumberland
Party	Candidate	Votes	%	±%
Unionist	Donald Howard	10,586	54.2	+3.6
Liberal	Richard Durning Holt	6,821	34.9	−14.5
Labour	B. Brooke	2,125	10.9	New
Majority		3,765	19.3	+18.1
Turnout		19,532	86.0	+2.8
Unionist hold		Swing	+9.1	

== Candidates ==
- The Cumberland North Unionist Association chose 33-year-old, first time candidate Captain Fergus Graham to defend the seat. He was the son of Sir Richard James Graham, and Lady Mabel Cynthia Duncombe. He was educated at Eton College and Christ Church, Oxford. He served in the European War with the Irish Guards from 1914–19. In 1918 he married Mary Spencer Revell Reade, daughter of Major-General Raymond Northland Revell Reade and Rose Frances Spence.
- The Cumberland North Liberal Association re-adopted 58-year-old Liverpool shipowner R.D. Holt as their candidate. In addition to being Liberal candidate here in 1923 and 1924 he had been Liberal MP for Hexham from 1907-18. He first stood as Liberal candidate at Liverpool West Derby in 1904 and 1906. He was also Liberal candidate for Eccles in 1918 and Rossendale in 1922. Holt was born at Toxteth Park, Lancashire, the son of Robert Durning Holt, Lord Mayor of Liverpool, a cotton broker, by his wife Lawrencina Potter. He was educated at Winchester and New College, Oxford. Holt married Eliza Lawrence Wells in 1897. They had three daughters, of whom the eldest, Grace, married Anthony Methuen, 5th Baron Methuen.
- The Cumberland North Constituency Labour Party selected H.W. McIntyre as their candidate. He was a schoolmaster from Whitley Bay, Northumberland.

== Campaign ==
Polling Day was set for 17 September 1926.

=== Liberal divisions ===
In 1926, the Liberal Party was internally divided between the supporters of party leader H.H. Asquith and parliamentary party chairman David Lloyd George. The 1926 General Strike had seen the two men take differing positions on the issue and Asquith publicly criticised Lloyd George's position. Holt had never been either a supporter of Lloyd George or the interventionist social liberal policies he had advocated in the past or was again advocating. Holt was a member of the 'Liberal Council' a body of Asquithian Liberals intent on frustrating Lloyd George. Although the ailing Asquith was still nominally the Liberal Party leader, increasingly Lloyd George was regarded as the leader in waiting. Therefore the decision of Lloyd George to neither visit the constituency during the by-election nor to issue a letter of support to Holt's candidacy, did not help the Liberal campaign.

== Result ==
There was a swing of 4.3% from Unionist to Liberal, but not a big enough swing to take the Liberals to victory. The Labour Party vote share went up.

North Cumberland by-election, 1926
Party	Candidate	Votes	%	±%
Unionist	Fergus Graham	8,867	47.8	−6.4
Liberal	Richard Durning Holt	6,871	37.1	+2.2
Labour	H. W. McIntyre	2,793	15.1	+4.2
Majority		1,996	10.7	−8.6
Turnout		18,331	82.0	−4.0
Unionist hold		Swing	-4.3	

== Aftermath ==
Three years later at the 1929 general election, there was a Graham/Holt re-match with a new Labour candidate. Graham was again the victor, despite a further swing of 3.8% to the Liberals;

1929 general election: North Cumberland
Party	Candidate	Votes	%	±%
Unionist	Fergus Graham	10,392	44.9	−2.9
Liberal	Richard Durning Holt	9,661	41.7	+4.6
Labour	C. A. O'Donnell	3,092	13.4	−1.7
Majority		731	3.2	−7.5
Turnout		23,145	83.7	+1.7
Unionist hold		Swing	-3.8	

Graham remained the member until his defeat by a Liberal in 1935. He later served as MP for Darlington from 1951-59. Holt did not stand for parliament again.
