= Baron Strathcona and Mount Royal =

Barony in the Peerage of the United Kingdom

Barony of Strathcona and Mount Royal
- Blazon Arms: Quarterly: 1st and 4th, Argent on a Bend indented between four Cross Crosslets Gules three Maple Leaves Or; 2nd and 3rd, Gules on a Fess Argent between a Demi-Lion rampant Or in chief and a Canoe of the last with four Men rowing proper in the stern a Flag of the second flowing towards the dexter inscribed with the letters NW Sable in base a Hammer surmounted of a Nail in saltire of the last Crest: On a Mount Vert a Beaver eating into a Maple Tree proper Supporters: Dexter: a Trooper of the Regiment of Strathcona's Horse proper; Sinister: a Navvy standing on a Railway Sleeper chaired and railed all proper
- Creation date: 26 June 1900
- Creation: Second
- Created by: Queen Victoria
- Peerage: Peerage of the United Kingdom
- First holder: Donald Smith, 1st Baron Strathcona and Mount Royal
- Present holder: Alexander Howard, 5th Baron Strathcona and Mount Royal
- Heir apparent: The Hon. Angus Howard
- Remainder to: 1st Baron's daughter, then to her heirs male of the body lawfully begotten
- Status: Extant
- Seat: Colonsay House
- Motto: Above the crest: Perseverance; Below the shield: Agmina Ducens

Baron Strathcona and Mount Royal, of Mount Royal in the Province of Quebec and Dominion of Canada, and of Glencoe in the County of Argyll, is a title in the Peerage of the United Kingdom. It was created in 1900 for the Scottish-born Canadian financier and politician Donald Smith, 1st Baron Strathcona and Mount Royal, with remainder in default of legitimate male issue to his only daughter, Margaret Charlotte. Smith had already been created Baron Strathcona and Mount Royal, of Glencoe in the County of Argyll, and of Mount Royal in the Province of Quebec and Dominion of Canada, in 1897, with remainder to the legitimate male issue of his body. This title was also in the Peerage of the United Kingdom.

Upon his death in 1914, the barony of 1897 became extinct, while he was succeeded according to the special remainder in the barony of 1900 by his daughter, who became the second Baroness. She was the wife of Robert Jared Bliss Howard, a surgeon. Their eldest son, the third Baron, represented North Cumberland in the British House of Commons as a Unionist from 1922 to 1926. He also served in the National Government as Captain of the Yeomen of the Guard from 1931 to 1934 and as Under-Secretary of State for War from 1934 to 1939. The latter's son, the fourth Baron, succeeded in 1959 and served under Margaret Thatcher as a Minister of State at the Ministry of Defence from 1979 to 1981. His son, the fifth Baron, succeeded in 2018.

Through his estate, the first Baron bequeathed nearly $2 million to educational institutions, including $500,000 to Yale University. Accordingly, Sheffield-Sterling-Strathcona Hall, a classroom and administration building on Yale's campus, is partially named in his honour.

The family seat is Colonsay House on the Isle of Colonsay, in the Scottish Inner Hebrides.

== Barons Strathcona and Mount Royal, First creation (1897) ==
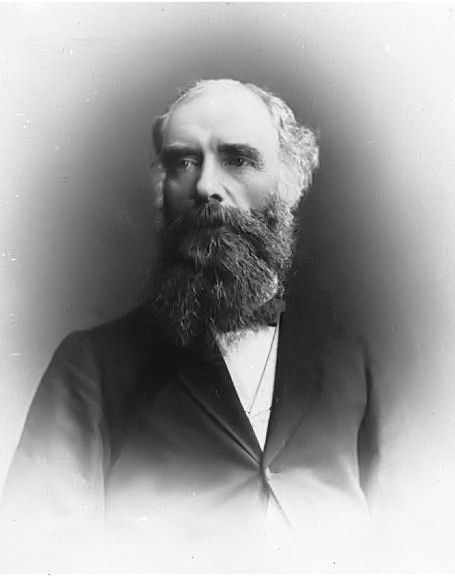
Donald Smith, 1st Baron Strathcona and Mount Royal

- Donald Alexander Smith, 1st Baron Strathcona and Mount Royal (1820–1914)

== Barons Strathcona and Mount Royal, Second creation (1900) ==
- Donald Alexander Smith, 1st Baron Strathcona and Mount Royal (1820–1914)
- Margaret Charlotte Howard, 2nd Baroness Strathcona and Mount Royal (1854–1926)
- Donald Sterling Palmer Howard, 3rd Baron Strathcona and Mount Royal (1891–1959)
- (Donald) Euan Palmer Howard, 4th Baron Strathcona and Mount Royal (1923–2018)
- (Donald) Alexander Euan Howard, 5th Baron Strathcona and Mount Royal (b. 1961)

The heir apparent is the present holder's son, the Hon. (Donald) Angus Ruaridh Howard (b. 1994).

== Line of succession ==
- Donald Alexander Smith, 1st Baron Strathcona and Mount Royal (1820–1914)
  - Margaret Charlotte Howard, 2nd Baroness Strathcona and Mount Royal (1854–1926)
    - Donald Sterling Palmer Howard, 3rd Baron Strathcona and Mount Royal (1891–1959)
      - (Donald) Euan Palmer Howard, 4th Baron Strathcona and Mount Royal (1923–2018)
        - (Donald) Alexander Euan Howard, 5th Baron Strathcona and Mount Royal (b. 1961)
          - (1) Hon. Donald Angus Ruaridh Howard (b. 1994)
        - (2) Hon. Andrew Barnaby Howard (b. 1963)
          - (3) Kier Hamish Shackleton Howard (b. 2000)
      - (4) Hon. Jonathan Alan Howard (b. 1933)
        - (5) Olaf Philipson Howard (b. 1970)
    - Hon. Sir Arthur Jared Palmer Howard (1896 – 1971)
      - Alexander Howard (1930 – 2014)
        - (6) Shamus Alexander Howard (b. 1962)
        - (7) Harry Alexander Howard (b. 1967)
        - (8) Rory Jared Howard (b. 1973)

== See also ==
- Canadian peers and baronets
