= Margaret Howard, 2nd Baroness Strathcona and Mount Royal =

British peer and medical doctor

The Right Honourable The Baroness Strathcona and Mount Royal

Personal details
- Born: Margaret Charlotte Smith; January 17, 1854
- Died: August 18, 1926 (aged 72)
- Spouse(s): Robert Howard (m. 1888; died 1921)
- Children: Donald Howard, 3rd Baron Strathcona and Mount Royal
- Parent: Donald Smith, 1st Baron Strathcona and Mount Royal (father)

Margaret Howard, 2nd Baroness Strathcona and Mount Royal (née Smith; 17 January 1854 - 18 August 1926) was a British peer and medical doctor.

She inherited the title from her father, the first Baron, the title having been created with a special remainder to allow female succession. In 1888, she married Robert Jared Bliss Howard OBE FRCS (1859–1921), son of Robert Palmer Howard (1823–1889), Dean of Medicine at McGill University.

She was succeeded by her son Donald Howard, 3rd Baron Strathcona and Mount Royal.

She is buried in Highgate Cemetery (East), London.

Peerage of the United Kingdom
Preceded by Donald Smith	Baroness Strathcona and Mount Royal; 1914–1926	Succeeded by Donald Howard
