= Strathcona Park, Calgary =

Strathcona Park
- Neighbourhood
- Location of Strathcona Park in Calgary
- Coordinates: 51°02′50″N 114°10′23″W
- Country: Canada
- Province: Alberta
- City: Calgary
- Quadrant: SW
- Ward: 6
- Established: 1980
- Annexed: 1956

Government
  - Mayor: Jeromy Farkas
  - Administrative body: Calgary City Council
  - Councillor: John Pantazopoulos (Independent)

Area
  - Total: 1.9 km^{2} (0.73 sq mi)
- Elevation: 1,185 m (3,888 ft)

Population (2006)
  - Total: 7,270
  - Average Income: $105,139
- Postal code: T3H
- Website: SCA Community Association

Strathcona Park is a residential neighbourhood in the southwest quadrant of Calgary, Alberta. It is bounded by Bow Trail to the north, Sarcee Trail to the east, Strathcona Drive and the community of Christie Park to the south and Strathcona Park Blvd to the west. Strathcona Park lies in the center of the neighbourhood.

The land was annexed to the City of Calgary in 1956 from the Municipal District of Rocky View. Strathcona Park was established as a neighbourhood in 1980. It is represented in the Calgary City Council by the Ward 6 councillor.

== Demographics ==
In the City of Calgary's 2012 municipal census, Strathcona Park had a population of 7,033 living in 2,436 dwellings, a 0.1% decrease from its 2011 population of 7,039. With a land area of 2.7 km^{2} (1.0 sq mi), it had a population density of 2,600/km^{2} (6,750/sq mi) in 2012.

Residents in this community had a median household income of $105,139 in 2000, and there were 9.8% low income residents living in the neighbourhood. As of 2000, 20.5% of the residents were immigrants. All buildings were single-family detached homes, and 7.9% of the housing was used for renting.

== Education ==
The community is served by Olympic Heights Elementary public school, and by John W. Costello Catholic Elementary Catholic school.

== See also ==
- List of neighbourhoods in Calgary
