= Donald Howard, 3rd Baron Strathcona and Mount Royal =

British politician (1891–1959)

The Right Honourable The Lord Strathcona and Mount Royal
- Photograph of Lord Strathcona and Mount Royal, by Walter Stoneman, 1923

Under-Secretary of State for War
- In office 1934–1939
- Preceded by: The Earl Stanhope
- Succeeded by: The Earl of Munster

Member of Parliament for North Cumberland
- In office 1922–1926
- Preceded by: Christopher Lowther
- Succeeded by: Fergus Graham

Personal details
- Born: Donald Sterling Palmer Howard; 14 June 1891
- Died: 22 February 1959 (aged 67)
- Party: Conservative
- Parent(s): Robert Jared Bliss Howard; Margaret Howard, 2nd Baroness Strathcona and Mount Royal
- Education: Eton College
- Alma mater: Trinity College, Cambridge

Donald Sterling Palmer Howard, 3rd Baron Strathcona and Mount Royal (14 June 1891 – 22 February 1959) was a Conservative Party politician in the United Kingdom.

== Early life ==
He was the son of Robert Jared Bliss Howard, OBE FRCS, and Margaret Howard, 2nd Baroness Strathcona and Mount Royal, who inherited her title from her father, the first Baron, the title having been created with a special remainder to allow female succession. His paternal grandfather, Robert Palmer Howard, was Dean of Medicine at McGill University.

He studied at Eton and Trinity College, Cambridge.

== Career ==
He was elected at the 1922 general election as Member of Parliament (MP) for Cumberland North and held the seat until 1926, when he succeeded to the peerage on the death of his mother. She had inherited the title from her father, the first Baron, the title having been created with a special remainder to allow female succession.

He served in the 1930s National Government as Captain of the Yeomen of the Guard from 1931 to 1934, and as Under-Secretary of State for War from 1934 to 1939.

== Personal life ==
On 25 October 1922, he married The Honourable Diana Evelyn Loder, daughter of Gerald Loder, 1st Baron Wakehurst, and Lady Louise de Vere Beauclerk (a daughter of William Beauclerk, 10th Duke of St Albans). Together, they were the parents of five children, including:

- Donald Euan Palmer Howard, 4th Baron Strathcona and Mount Royal (1923–2018), who married Lady Jane Mary Waldegrave, daughter of The 12th Earl Waldegrave, in 1954. They divorced in 1977 and he married Patricia (née Thomas), widow of John Middleton, in 1978.
- The Hon. Barnaby John Howard (1925–2011), who married Elizabeth Mayfield, daughter of Frank McConnell Mayfield, in 1952. They divorced in 1967 and he married Mary-Jane Chambers, daughter of Ambrose Chambers, in 1970. After her death in 1994, he married Linda Frances Kitson, daughter of Henry James Buller Kitson, in 1996. He married Evelyn McDonald in 2006.
- The Hon. Jonathan Alan Howard (born 1933), who married Hon. Brigid Mary Westenra, daughter of William Westenra, 6th Baron Rossmore, in 1956. They divorced in 1969 and he married Cecilia Philipson in 1970.
- The Hon. Diana Catriona Howard (born 1935), who married Michael Leslie Ogilvie Faber, son of George Valdemar Faber, in 1956.

On his death in 1959, he was succeeded in the peerage by his eldest son, Euan.

== See also ==
- Bell Telephone Memorial
- Canadian Hereditary Peers

Parliament of the United Kingdom
Preceded by Christopher Lowther	Member of Parliament for North Cumberland; 1922–1926	Succeeded by Fergus Graham
Political offices
Preceded by The Earl Stanhope	Under-Secretary of State for War; 1934–1939	Succeeded by The Earl of Munster
Peerage of the United Kingdom
Preceded by Margaret Howard	Baron Strathcona and Mount Royal; 1926–1959	Succeeded by Euan Howard
