= Doug Donaldson =

Canadian politician (born 1957)

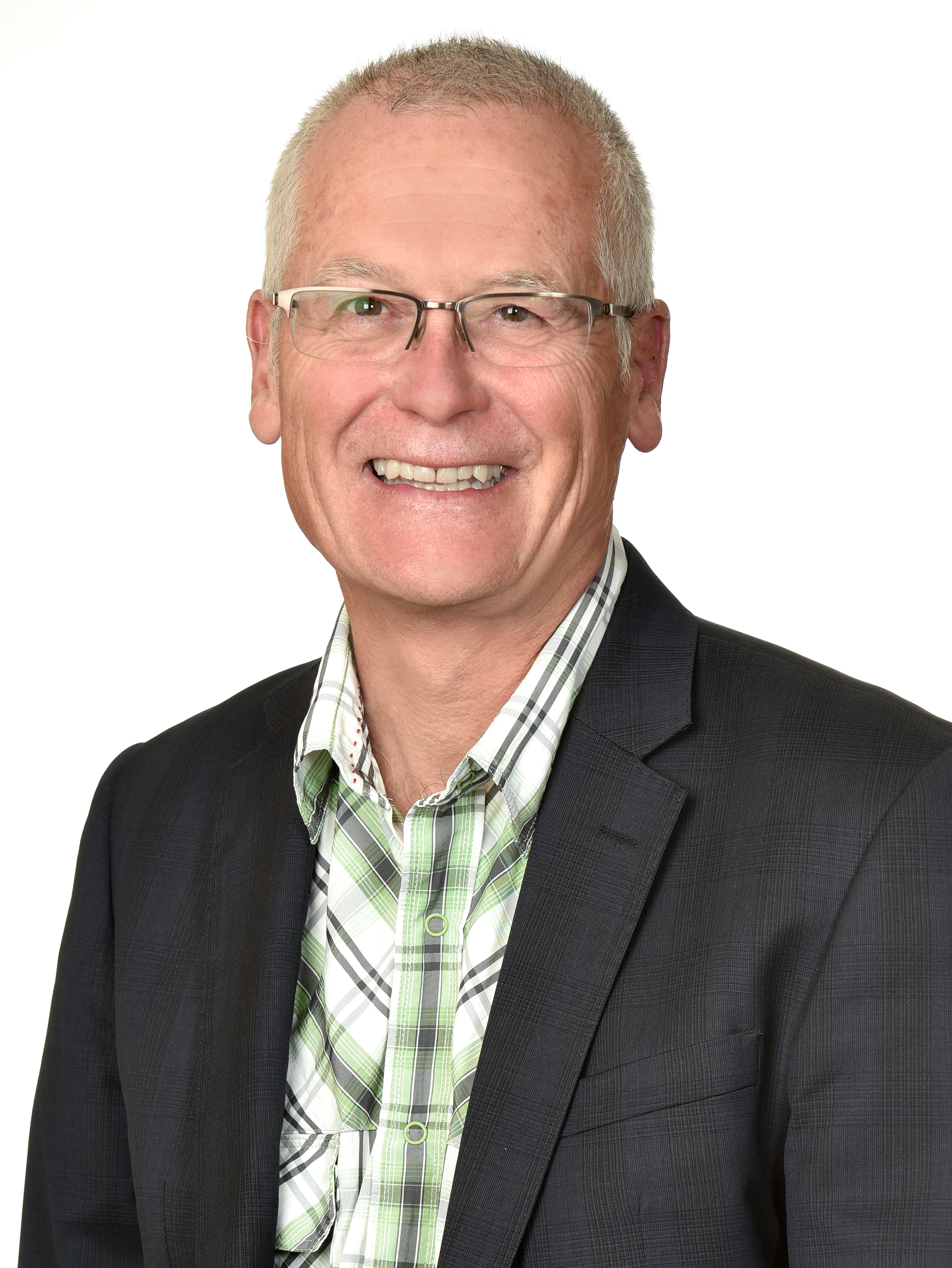
- Donaldson in 2017

Minister of Forests, Lands, Natural Resource Operations and Rural Development of British Columbia
- In office July 18, 2017 – November 26, 2020
- Premier: John Horgan
- Preceded by: John Rustad(Forests, Lands, Natural Resource Operations)/Donna Barnett (Rural Development)
- Succeeded by: Katrine Conroy

Member of the British Columbia Legislative Assembly for Stikine
- In office May 12, 2009 – October 24, 2020
- Preceded by: Dennis MacKay
- Succeeded by: Nathan Cullen

Personal details
- Born: January 20, 1957 (age 69)
- Party: New Democrat
- Occupation: Politician, journalist

Doug Donaldson (born January 20, 1957) is a Canadian politician, who represented the Stikine electoral district Legislative Assembly of British Columbia from 2009 to 2020. He is a member of the British Columbia New Democratic Party and was first elected as a Member of the Legislative Assembly in the 2009 election and re-elected in the 2013 and 2017 elections. During the 41st Parliament (2017-2020) he served in the Executive Council as the Minister of Forests, Lands and Natural Resource Operations, and Rural Development. In that role he led the government through adopted several bills including amending the Heritage Conservation Act to create a legal duty-to-report discoveries of specific sites or objects with potential heritage value and amending the Forest Act to insert consideration of the "public interest" in decisions to approve the forestry dispositions. As a member of the official opposition in the 39th and 40th Parliaments he served in various critic and deputy roles at different times, such as on issues relating to mines, energy, finance and children and family development issues. He introduced one private member bill to amend the Oil and Gas Activities Act to prohibit the conversion of natural gas pipelines to transmit oil or diluted bitumen.

Prior to becoming an MLA, Donaldson had lived in numerous towns in British Columbia, including Field, British Columbia where he worked in Yoho National Park, Prince George, Telkwa, Houston, and Smithers. He eventually settled in Hazelton where he worked with the Gitxsan Nation and ran a non-profit organization, the Storytellers Foundation, which focused on community-level economic development. He spent ten years as a municipal councillor, having been elected or acclaimed in the 1999, 2002, 2005 and 2009 local government elections.

== Background ==
With his father working in the Royal Canadian Air Force, Doug Donaldson was born in 1957 at the Canadian Forces' Zweibrücken Air Base in Germany. Donaldson completed a bachelor's degree in Biology and moved to Field, British Columbia where he worked in Yoho National Park for 8 years before leading private guided tours of the area. After completing a Masters in Journalism he had numerous articles published in the Calgary Herald and The Vancouver Sun but moved to Smithers where he wrote for a local newspaper, The Interior News. He took a job in Prince George with the CBC Morning Show but moved back to the Bulkley Valley area, living in Telkwa as a technologist in the forestry industry before moving to Houston working as a manager at Northwest Community College (later renamed "Coast Mountain College"). Finally, Donaldson settled in the village of Hazelton where he became the communications officer for the Gitxsan Treaty Office. In 1992, he starting teaching journalism at the Gitxsan Wet'suwet'en Education Society located in the same village. In 1994, he co-founded the non-profit group Storytellers Foundation which focuses on civic literacy and economic development on the community-level.

He got involved in municipal politics in 1999 when he became a member of the municipal council of the village of Hazelton. He retained his seat in the 2002 local government elections, and won re-election in November 2005. For the May 2005 provincial election, Donaldson put his name forward to represent the BC New Democratic Party in the Bulkley Valley-Stikine constituency. In the nomination race he defeated three other candidates, including the former MLA Bill Goodacre. This riding was expected to be competitive as it had traditionally supported the NDP but was being held by BC Liberal Party member Dennis MacKay. Donaldson was supported party leader Carole James who visited the riding during the campaign but had to defend party campaign promises that appeared to mean removing provincial funding for major upgrades to a Smithers ice arena and a Houston swimming pool. Also, during the election campaign, Elections BC identified third-party advertising violations at Donaldson's campaign office where they were distributing B.C. Government Employees Union-sponsored lawn signs; Elections BC told the campaign office to cease the distribution and account for the signs as part of their own campaign expenditures. Mackay, a retired provincial coroner, won re-election by defeating Donaldson.

Donaldson would again be the NDP nominee for the 2009 provincial election, but in the years between the election he continued to being active on the Hazelton council. He led the council and the Union of B.C. Municipalities to adopt a resolution asking the province to place a moratorium on new fish farm licences until the report by the provincial Special Committee on Sustainable Aquaculture was made public. Donaldson also supported efforts which called for a suspension of the Klappan Coalbed Methane Project in the Sacred Headwaters.

== Provincial politics ==
For the May 2009 provincial election Donaldson won the NDP nomination in March and campaigned throughout April and May. Party leader Carole James visited the riding to support Donaldson. The incumbent, Dennis MacKay, had retired but Donaldson faced two new opponents: vehicle service manager Scott Groves for the BC Liberals and Smithers HVAC engineer Roger Benham for the BC Green Party. While Donaldson won the riding, the BC Liberals were re-elected to form another majority government. The BC NDP formed the official opposition and Bruce Ralston was named Finance critic with Donaldson as his deputy.

=== 39th Parliament ===
During the 39th Parliament he was appointed to the Select Standing Committee on Finance and Government Services where he served as deputy chair. As part of this committee he traveled the province for public consultation on budget matters. In the first session (2009), Donaldson and the NDP supported 75% of the recommendations, dissenting on the others that related to the introduction of the Harmonized Sales Tax (HST). Donaldson was opposed to the replacement of the Provincial Sales Tax with the HST, claiming that the BC Liberals were "wildly inflating its benefits". During the second session (2010), Donaldson again traveled the province with the committee but led the NDP in withdrawing their participation after Premier Gordon Campbell announced, two weeks before the committee's report was due, that he had already allocated all the province's discretionary funding. A petition asking to the HST to be repealed was circulated within his riding; the FightHST organization claimed 3,648 people (30% of voters) signed in the Stikine riding and in the Summer 2011 referendum on the issue 3,300 people in the riding voted to repeal the HST.

Donaldson opened two constituency offices, one in Hazelton and the other in Smithers. On local issues, Donaldson, along with his federal counterpart Nathan Cullen, tried to stop Nav Canada from replacing flight observers with electronic monitoring devices at the Smithers Airport. Donaldson initiated a writing contest supported by hockey player Dan Hamhuis, the Gitxsan Nation, and the Community Police, where youths described how sports activities helped them resist gang activity and contributed to their community. Donaldson became an advocate of strong environmental assessment reviews as a means of creating investor certainty in projects. His opposition to the proposed Enbridge Northern Gateway Pipelines angered Premier Campbell. Donaldson was critical of the provincial government's negotiation skills with federal government on RCMP contracts and funding relating to changes in crime legislation and with First Nations engagement on mining proposals.

Donaldson was a supporter of BC NDP leader Carole James, but after her resignation, he supported Mike Farnworth during the leadership election, citing Farnworth's view of rural economic development which includes using a triple bottom line that involves social, environmental and economic criteria. Due to the leadership election, Donaldson also became the NDP critic on Energy, Mines and Petroleum Resources, in addition to being the deputy critic on Finance. Adrian Dix eventually won the leadership and kept Ralston and Donaldson as the critic and deputy critic on Finance but moved Donaldson to deputy critic on Energy and Mines. A year later, in July 2012, Dix split the Energy and Mines critic role and appointed Donaldson to be critic of Mines, while removing him from the Finance portfolio. As critic of Mines, Donaldson questioned the government's approval of allowing 200 temporary foreign workers to fill positions in a Tumbler Ridge coal mine but was supportive of the government's refusal of a copper-gold-molybdenum mine, near Granisle, due to the adverse effects on fisheries.

=== 40th Parliament ===
Entering the May 2013 general election, Donaldson was acclaimed as the NDP candidate in December 2012 with his primary opponent Sharon Hartwell, the former mayor of Telkwa, being announced as the BC Liberal candidate in April. Also in the election, Donaldson faced Roger Benham of the BC Green Party again, as well as the former leader of the Christian Heritage Party Rod Taylor, BC Conservative Jonathan Dieleman, and independent candidate Jesse O'Leary. The polls projected Donaldson and the NDP to win the election. While Donaldson did win re-election, the NDP again formed the Official Opposition to the BC Liberals who won an expanded majority. As the 40th Parliament began, Donaldson was reassigned to be the critic for aboriginal relations and reconciliation. In July 2014, new party leader John Horgan reassigned Donaldson to be the critic for children and family development issues but upon the July 2016 announcement of Norm Macdonald not seeking re-election, Donaldson was again reassigned to Macdonald position as critic for Energy and Mines. Donaldson sponsored one private member bill, the British Columbia Oil and Gas Activities Amendment Act, 2014 which proposed to prohibit the conversion of natural gas pipelines to transmit oil or diluted bitumen. While the bill did not advance beyond first reading, its proposal was implemented by the Minister of Natural Gas Development as a regulation.

=== 41st Parliament ===
Donaldson sought re-election in the 2017 provincial election, where he was challenged by Gitanyow Band Councillor Wanda Good for the BC Liberals and, again, Rod Taylor of the Christian Heritage Party. While Donaldson again won the Stikine riding, his BC NDP formed the Official Opposition to a BC Liberal minority government as the 41st Parliament began. As neither opposition parties were willing to support the BC Liberal government, they lost a confidence vote and the BC NDP was offered the opportunity to form a minority government. NDP leader John Horgan became the Premier and appointed Donaldson to his Executive Council as Minister of Forests, Lands, Natural Resource Operations and Rural Development. In this role, he led three bills through parliament. First, Bill 37 of the 3rd session, titled Land Statutes Amendment Act, 2018, was introduced on October 1 and adopted on October 31, 2018. It amended the Land Act, Land Title Act, Strata Property Act and Property Transfer Tax Act to allow for more e-signature and e-filings technologies, and amended the Boundary Act to allow certain adjustments of the border between BC and Alberta to be made without a referendum. Bill 21 of the 4th session, titled Forest and Range Practices Amendment Act, 2019 and adopted on May 16, 2019, amended the Forest and Range Practices Act to require forest companies publish Forest Operation Maps and update stewardship plans every 5 years or following a wildfire. Bill 14, the Heritage Conservation Amendment Act, 2019 and adopted on May 30, 2019, amended the Heritage Conservation Act to create a legal duty-to-report discoveries of specific sites or objects with potential heritage value and expanded the government's to amend and refuse permits and otherwise enforce the act. Finally, also adopted on May 30, Bill 22 amended the Forest Act to insert consideration of the "public interest" in decision to approve the disposition of Forest Act agreements and require ministerial approval of the transferring of a timber licences between companies. In addition, at that time Donaldson's ministry initiated a review of its approach to logging of old-growth forest with the recommendations announced in September 2020. However, amid speculation of a snap election in that same month, Donaldson announced he would not be seeking re-election. In the subsequent October election, his NDP retained the Stikine seat with Nathan Cullen winning the riding.

== Election history ==
2017 British Columbia general election: Stikine
Party	Candidate	Votes	%	±%	Expenditures
New Democratic	Doug Donaldson	4,748	52.10	+4.99	$34,474
Liberal	Wanda Good	3,531	38.75	+2.13	$50,964
Christian Heritage	Rod Taylor	834	9.15	+3.22	$9,112
Total valid votes		9,113	100.0	–	
Total rejected ballots		62	0.68	+0.27	
Turnout		9,175	65.61	+2.79	
Registered voters		13,985			
New Democratic hold		Swing		+1.43	
Source: Elections BC

2013 British Columbia general election: Stikine
Party	Candidate	Votes	%	±%	Expenditures
New Democratic	Doug Donaldson	4,074	47.10	–3.3	$49,856
Liberal	Sharon Hartwell	3,167	36.61	–8.49	$45,162
Conservative	Jonathan Dieleman	533	6.16	–	$6,706
Christian Heritage	Rod Taylor	514	5.94	–	$14,482
Green	Roger Benham	303	3.50	–0.9	$480
Independent	Jesse OLeary	59	0.68	–	$380
Total valid votes		8,662	100.00	–	
Total rejected ballots		35	0.40	-0.7	
Turnout		8,697	62.82	-2.48	
Registered voters		13,845			
Source: Elections BC

2009 British Columbia general election: Stikine
Party	Candidate	Votes	%	Expenditures
New Democratic	Doug Donaldson	4,274	50.4	$43,322
Liberal	Scott Groves	3,829	45.1	$81,572
Green	Roger Benham	375	4.4	$692
Total valid votes		8,478	100	
Total rejected ballots		94	1.1	
Turnout		8,572	65.3	
Registered voters		13,131		

2005 British Columbia general election: Bulkley Valley-Stikine
Party	Candidate	Votes	%	Expenditures
Liberal	Dennis MacKay	6,279	48.30	$96,735
New Democratic	Doug Donaldson	5,177	39.82	$50,561
Green	Leanna Mitchell	769	5.91	$3,466
Democratic Reform	Nipper Kettle	354	2.72	$2,899
Marijuana	Reginald Bruce Gunanoot	205	1.58	$100
British Columbia Party	Jack Kortmeyer	175	1.35	$344
People's Front	Frank Martin	41	0.32	$540
Total valid votes		13,000	100	
Total rejected ballots		60	0.46	
Turnout		13,060	68.78	

British Columbia provincial government of John Horgan
Cabinet post (1)
Predecessor	Office	Successor
Steve Thomson	Minister of Forests, Land, Natural Resources and Rural Development; July 18, 2017–	Incumbent
