= Andrew George Jr. =

Canadian chef and writer

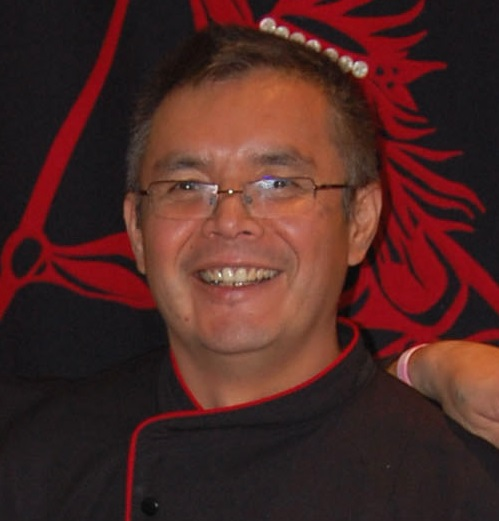
- Andrew George Jr in 2012
- Born: Smithers, British Columbia
- Occupations: Chef, writer

Andrew George Jr. is a Canadian chef and writer.

== Biography ==
George was born in Smithers, British Columbia, and grew up in Telkwa, British Columbia.

George attended Smithers Senior Secondary School and graduated in the 1980s. In the 1980s, George trained in catering at Vancouver Vocational Institute and British Columbia Institute of Technology.

In the fall of 1991, George was a representative for the First Nations of Canada with four other chefs to participate in the World Culinary Olympics held in Frankfurt, Germany in October 1992. The team was known as the Native Canadian Haute Cuisine Team, the other members being David Wolfman, Bertha Skye, Arnold Olson and Brian Sappier.

In 1997, George co-authored a cookbook called FEAST - Canadian Native Cuisine for all Seasons. The book was designed around the Wet'suwet'en people and George's traditions.

On September 28, 1998, George started work at the Office of the Wet'suwet'en (Treaty Office) in Smithers, British Columbia in Forestry related matters. He remained in this position until 2005.

George was head chef at the Four Host First Nations pavilion at the 2010 Winter Olympics.

== Personal life ==
George is of Wetʼsuwetʼen descent belonging to the Bear clan (Gitdumden) and Grizzly house (Cas yex).

== Books ==
- George Jr., Andrew Feast! : Canadian native cuisine for all seasons (1997) ISBN 0-385-25580-2
- George Jr., Andrew A Feast for All Seasons: Traditional Native Peoples' Cuisine (2010) ISBN 1-55152-368-X
- George Jr., Andrew Modern Native Feasts: Healthy, Innovative, Sustainable Cuisine (2013) ISBN 978-1551525075

== Sources ==
- Montreal Gazette article on George and his writings
