= Bulkley Valley-Stikine =

Provincial electoral district in British Columbia, Canada

Bulkey Valley-Stikine
British Columbia electoral district
- Interactive map of riding boundaries

Provincial electoral district
- Legislature: Legislative Assembly of British Columbia
MLA
Sharon Hartwell
Conservative
- First contested: 1991
- Last contested: 2026

Demographics
- Population (2021): 20,552
- Area (km²): 196,484
- Pop. density (per km²): 0.1
- Census division(s): Kitimat-Stikine, Stikine
- Census subdivision(s): Atlin, Dease Lake, Hazelton, New Hazelton, Smithers, Stewart, Stikine, Telkwa

Bulkley Valley-Stikine (formerly Stikine) is a provincial electoral district for the Legislative Assembly of British Columbia.

The riding was known as Bulkley Valley-Stikine from its first creation in 1991 until the 2009 election. Following the Electoral Districts Act, 2008, which came into effect upon the dissolution of the BC Legislature in April 2009, the riding was renamed Stikine. Following the 2021 British Columbia electoral redistribution that took effect for the 2024 election, it returned to its original name but did not undergo any boundary changes.

== Demographics ==
Population, 2021	20,552
Area (km^{2})	196,484
Pop. density (people per km^{2})	0.1
Source: BC Electoral Boundaries Commission

== Geography ==
As of the 2024 provincial election, Bulkley Valley-Stikine comprises the entire Stikine Region, the northern portion of the Regional District of Kitimat-Stikine and a small area of the Regional District of Bulkley-Nechako containing the communities of Smithers and Telkwa. Located in northwestern British Columbia the electoral district is bordered by the Yukon to the north and Alaska, United States to the west. Other communities in the electoral district consist of New Hazelton, Stewart and Atlin.

== Members of the Legislative Assembly ==
This electoral district has elected the following members of the Legislative Assembly:

Assembly	Years	Member	Party
Bulkley Valley-Stikine; Riding created from Atlin, Skeena and Omineca
35th	1991–1996	Jackie Pement	New Democratic
36th	1996–2001	Bill Goodacre	New Democratic
37th	2001–2005	Dennis MacKay	Liberal
38th	2005–2009	Dennis MacKay	Liberal
Stikine
39th	2009–2013	Doug Donaldson	New Democratic
40th	2013–2017	Doug Donaldson	New Democratic
41st	2017–2020	Doug Donaldson	New Democratic
42nd	2020–2024	Nathan Cullen	New Democratic
Bulkley Valley-Stikine
43rd	2024–2026	Sharon Hartwell	Conservative
44th	2026–present	Sharon Hartwell	Conservative

== Election results ==
=== Bulkley Valey-Stikine ===
2026 British Columbia general election
Party	Candidate	Votes	%	±%	Expenditures
Conservative	Sharon Hartwell	4,486	50.08	–2.23	
New Democratic	Frankie Abel	4,123	46.03	+7.17	
Christian Heritage	Ed Ewald	292	3.26	+0.76	
Total valid votes		8,901	99.36	–	
Total rejected ballots		57	0.64	+0.38	
Turnout		8,958			
Registered voters		15,427			
Conservative hold		Swing		−4.70	
Source: Elections BC

2024 British Columbia general election
Party	Candidate	Votes	%	±%	Expenditures
Conservative	Sharon Hartwell	4,992	52.31	–	$34,154.30
New Democratic	Nathan Cullen	3,709	38.86	−12.91	$42,557.85
Green	Gamlakyeltxw Wilhelm Marsden	604	6.33	–	$889.70
Christian Heritage	Rod Taylor	239	2.50	−8.98	$8,901.96
Total valid votes/expense limit		9,544	99.74	–	$71,700.08
Total rejected ballots		25	0.26	–	
Turnout		9,569	64.24	+14.11	
Registered voters		14,895			
Conservative gain from New Democratic		Swing		+32.61	
Source: Elections BC

=== Stikine ===
2020 British Columbia general election: Stikine
Party	Candidate	Votes	%	±%	Expenditures
New Democratic	Nathan Cullen	3,745	51.77	−0.33	$32,249.48
Liberal	Gordon Sebastian	1,904	26.32	-12.43	$25,199.00
Christian Heritage	Rod Taylor	831	11.49	+2.34	$11,622.14
Rural	Darcy Repen	754	10.42	–	$1,115.05
Total valid votes		7,234	99.26	–	
Total rejected ballots		54	0.74	+0.06	
Turnout		7,288	50.13	−15.48	
Registered voters		14,537			
Source: Elections BC

2017 British Columbia general election: Stikine
Party	Candidate	Votes	%	±%	Expenditures
New Democratic	Doug Donaldson	4,748	52.10	+4.99	$34,474
Liberal	Wanda Good	3,531	38.75	+2.13	$50,964
Christian Heritage	Rod Taylor	834	9.15	+3.22	$9,112
Total valid votes		9,113	100.0	–	
Total rejected ballots		62	0.68	+0.27	
Turnout		9,175	65.61	+2.79	
Registered voters		13,985			
New Democratic hold		Swing		+1.43	
Source: Elections BC

2013 British Columbia general election: Stikine
Party	Candidate	Votes	%	±%	Expenditures
New Democratic	Doug Donaldson	4,074	47.10	–3.3	$49,856
Liberal	Sharon Hartwell	3,167	36.61	–8.49	$45,162
Conservative	Jonathan Dieleman	533	6.16	–	$6,706
Christian Heritage	Rod Taylor	514	5.94	–	$14,482
Green	Roger Benham	303	3.50	–0.9	$480
Independent	Jesse OLeary	59	0.68	–	$380
Total valid votes		8,662	100.00	–	
Total rejected ballots		35	0.40	-0.7	
Turnout		8,697	62.82	-2.48	
Registered voters		13,845			
Source: Elections BC

2009 British Columbia general election: Stikine
Party	Candidate	Votes	%	Expenditures
New Democratic	Doug Donaldson	4,274	50.4	$43,322
Liberal	Scott Groves	3,829	45.1	$81,572
Green	Roger Benham	375	4.4	$692
Total valid votes		8,478	100	
Total rejected ballots		94	1.1	
Turnout		8,572	65.3	
Registered voters		13,131		

=== Bulkley Valley-Stikine ===
2005 British Columbia general election
Party	Candidate	Votes	%	Expenditures
Liberal	Dennis MacKay	6,279	48.30	$96,735
New Democratic	Doug Donaldson	5,177	39.82	$50,561
Green	Leanna Mitchell	769	5.91	$3,466
Democratic Reform	Nipper Kettle	354	2.72	$2,899
Marijuana	Reginald Bruce Gunanoot	205	1.58	$100
British Columbia Party	Jack Kortmeyer	175	1.35	$344
People's Front	Frank Martin	41	0.32	$540
Total valid votes		13,000	100	
Total rejected ballots		60	0.46	
Turnout		13,060	68.78	

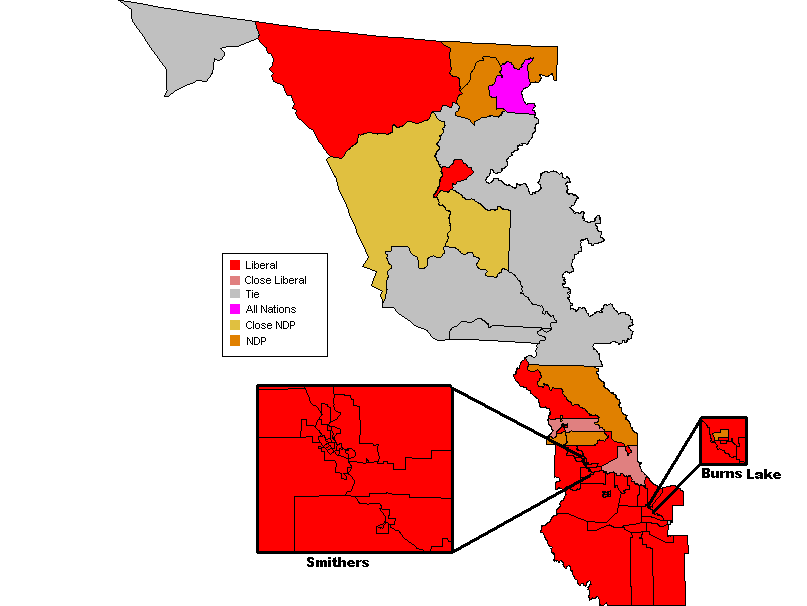
Distribution of popular vote map by voting area

2001 British Columbia general election
Party	Candidate	Votes	%	±%	Expenditures
Liberal	Dennis MacKay	7,414	55.93	+27.06	$44,836
New Democratic	Bill Goodacre	2,823	21.29	−15.73	$30,795
Unity	Rod Taylor	1,190	8.98	–	$11,169
Green	Rolf Hussinger	856	6.46	+5.29	$3,693
Marijuana	Trevor McKilligan	507	3.82	–	$582
All Nations	Theresa Tait	405	3.05	–	$5,540
Citizens Alliance	Bill Forsyth	62	0.47	–	–
Total valid votes		13,257	100.00		
Total rejected ballots		44	0.33		
Turnout		13,301	73.28		

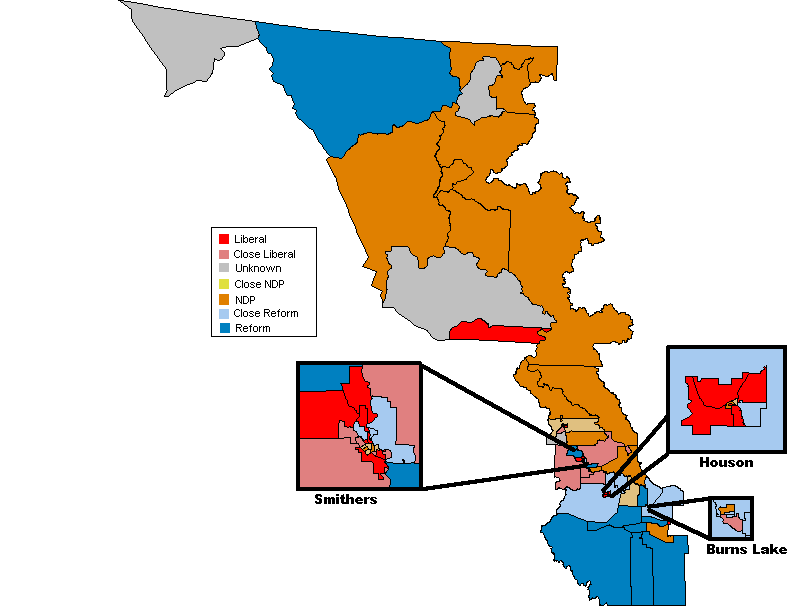
Distribution of popular vote map by voting area

1996 British Columbia general election
Party	Candidate	Votes	%	±%	Expenditures
New Democratic	Bill Goodacre	4,779	37.02	+3.05	$19,497
Liberal	Pat Beach	3,726	28.87	−2.69	$28,587
Reform	Bill Zemenchik	3,473	26.91	–	$26,855
Progressive Democrat	Sharon L. Hartwell	624	4.83	–	$2,926
Social Credit	Peter Barendregt	155	1.20	–	$2,481
Green	Stuart Hertzog	151	1.17	–	$997
Total valid votes		12,908	100.00		
Total rejected ballots		52	0.40		
Turnout		12,960	71.05		

1991 British Columbia general election
Party	Candidate	Votes	%	Expenditures
New Democratic	Jackie Pement	3,744	33.97	$26,935
Liberal	Alice Maitland	3,479	31.56	$787
Independent	Jack Kempf	2,842	25.79	$13,905
Independent	Herbert George	957	8.68	$16,448
Total valid votes		11,022	100.00	
Total rejected ballots		260	2.30	
Turnout		11,282	70.24	

== See also ==
- List of British Columbia provincial electoral districts
- Canadian provincial electoral districts
