= Sharon Hartwell =

Canadian politician

Sharon Hartwell MLA

Member of the British Columbia Legislative Assembly for Bulkley Valley-Stikine
- Incumbent
- Assumed office October 19, 2024
- Preceded by: Nathan Cullen

Parliamentary Secretary for Seniors
- Incumbent
- Assumed office November 20, 2026
- Preceded by: Susie Chant

Mayor of Telkwa
- In office 1995–2009

Personal details
- Party: BC Conservative (since 2024)
- Other political affiliations: BC Liberal (2013); Independent (1995–2009); PDA (1996)

Sharon L. Hartwell MLA is a Canadian politician who has served as a member of the Legislative Assembly of British Columbia (MLA) representing the electoral district of Bulkley Valley-Stikine since 2024. She is a member of the Conservative Party.

== Early life and career ==
Hartwell was born and raised in the Bulkley Valley. She has two sons, who also live in the region. Hartwell was a business owner dedicated to her communities, which led to her start in politics.

Between then 2009 British Columbia general election and her 2023 nomination for the 2024 British Columbia general election, she lived in Alberta for eight years.

== Political career ==
=== Municipal politics ===
Hartwell as served in the public service for over 20 years. Her involvement began when she served a term and a half as a village councillor for Telkwa, British Columbia, after which she served as mayor from 1995 through 2009.

During her tenure she served as the Small Community Representative for the Union of BC Municipalities (UBCM) successfully lobbying for a grant process that improved the relationship between the municipalities and the provincial and federal governments.

She was also elected to the Federation of Canadian Municipalities (FCM) where she participated in the Rural Forum successfully advocating for improvements to the infrastructure formula for rural communities across Canada. She also became the Vice-Chair of Transportation and Infrastructure for FCM where she oversaw airport-related matters. As Vice-Chair she also joined the Rail Safety Committee which addressed rail safety issues across Canadian communities, and the Environment Committee which explored technological solutions.

In addition to her involvement in UBCM and FCM, she has sat on the Northern Health Board for almost eight years, and has served as the chair of the North West Regional Hospital District improving healthcare delivery by initiating the Northern Health Connections Bus program to provide transportation for medical appointments, and oversaw the construction of a new hospital in Masset.

Hartwell also founded Team BC, a program celebrating small and rural communities. This program became a success with 82 participating communities, who had their unique attributes highlighted and celebrated.

=== Provincial politics ===
Hartwell first ran provincially in the 1996 British Columbia general election as a member of the Progressive Democratic Alliance for the riding of Bulkley Valley-Stikine.

Hartwell ran once again in the 2013 British Columbia general election as the BC Liberal candidate for the Bulkley Valley-Stikine riding. She lost to NDP incumbent Doug Donaldson.

In November 2023, Hartwell was nominated as the Conservative Party of BC's candidate for Bulkley Valley-Stikine in the 2024 British Columbia general election. She went on to receive over fifty per cent of the vote, winning a seat in the BC Legislative Assembly, and upsetting NDP incumbent and cabinet minister Nathan Cullen. Hartwell currently sits in the official opposition's shadow cabinet as the Critic for Rural Communities and Rural Development.

== Political controversies ==
Hartwell called for Bonnie Henry's firing as BC's provincial health officer for her actions during the COVID-19 pandemic in British Columbia such as supporting the COVID-19 vaccine. In 2024, Hartwell was criticized for describing Tamara Lich and Chris Barber, organizers of the Freedom Convoy, as "an inspiration".

In February 2024, Hartwell replied "Yes" to a Twitter post asking if "Democrats cheated and that President Donald Trump won the last election?" Furthermore, she has endorsed Canada's withdrawal from the World Health Organization and the United Nations.

== Electoral history ==
2026 British Columbia general election: Bulkley Valley-Stikine
Party	Candidate	Votes	%	±%	Expenditures
Conservative	Sharon Hartwell	4,486	50.08	–2.23	
New Democratic	Frankie Abel	4,123	46.03	+7.17	
Christian Heritage	Ed Ewald	292	3.26	+0.76	
Total valid votes		8,901	99.36	–	
Total rejected ballots		57	0.64	+0.38	
Turnout		8,958			
Registered voters		15,427			
Conservative hold		Swing		−4.70	
Source: Elections BC

2024 British Columbia general election: Bulkley Valley-Stikine
Party	Candidate	Votes	%	±%	Expenditures
Conservative	Sharon Hartwell	4,992	52.31	–	$34,154.30
New Democratic	Nathan Cullen	3,709	38.86	−12.91	$42,557.85
Green	Gamlakyeltxw Wilhelm Marsden	604	6.33	–	$889.70
Christian Heritage	Rod Taylor	239	2.50	−8.98	$8,901.96
Total valid votes/expense limit		9,544	99.74	–	$71,700.08
Total rejected ballots		25	0.26	–	
Turnout		9,569	64.24	+14.11	
Registered voters		14,895			
Conservative gain from New Democratic		Swing		+32.61	
Source: Elections BC

2013 British Columbia general election: Stikine
Party	Candidate	Votes	%	±%	Expenditures
New Democratic	Doug Donaldson	4,074	47.10	–3.3	$49,856
Liberal	Sharon Hartwell	3,167	36.61	–8.49	$45,162
Conservative	Jonathan Dieleman	533	6.16	–	$6,706
Christian Heritage	Rod Taylor	514	5.94	–	$14,482
Green	Roger Benham	303	3.50	–0.9	$480
Independent	Jesse OLeary	59	0.68	–	$380
Total valid votes		8,662	100.00	–	
Total rejected ballots		35	0.40	-0.7	
Turnout		8,697	62.82	-2.48	
Registered voters		13,845			
Source: Elections BC

1996 British Columbia general election: Bulkley Valley-Stikine
Party	Candidate	Votes	%	±%	Expenditures
New Democratic	Bill Goodacre	4,779	37.02	+3.05	$19,497
Liberal	Pat Beach	3,726	28.87	−2.69	$28,587
Reform	Bill Zemenchik	3,473	26.91	–	$26,855
Progressive Democrat	Sharon L. Hartwell	624	4.83	–	$2,926
Social Credit	Peter Barendregt	155	1.20	–	$2,481
Green	Stuart Hertzog	151	1.17	–	$997
Total valid votes		12,908	100.00		
Total rejected ballots		52	0.40		
Turnout		12,960	71.05		

== See also ==
- 43rd Parliament of British Columbia
