= Nathan Cullen =

Canadian politician (born 1972)

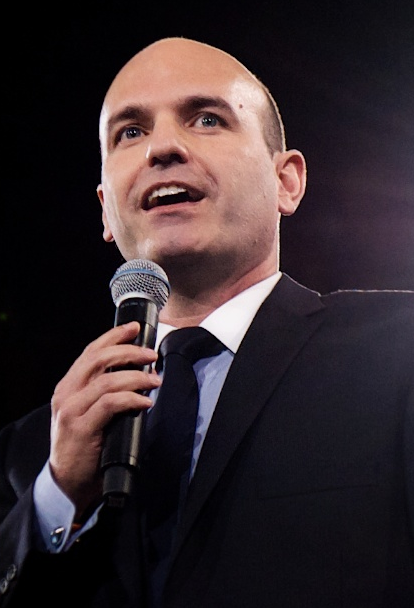
- Nathan Cullen in 2012

Minister of Water, Land and Resource Stewardship of British Columbia
- In office December 7, 2022 – November 18, 2024
- Premier: David Eby
- Preceded by: Josie Osborne
- Succeeded by: Randene Neill

Minister of Municipal Affairs and Minister Responsible for Immigration of British Columbia
- In office February 25, 2022 – December 7, 2022
- Premier: John Horgan; David Eby
- Preceded by: Josie Osborne
- Succeeded by: Anne Kang

Minister of State for Lands and Natural Resource Operations of British Columbia
- In office November 26, 2020 – February 25, 2022
- Premier: John Horgan
- Preceded by: Position established
- Succeeded by: Position abolished

Member of the British Columbia Legislative Assembly for Stikine
- In office October 24, 2020 – September 21, 2024
- Preceded by: Doug Donaldson
- Succeeded by: Sharon Hartwell

Shadow Minister of Finance
- In office March 20, 2014 – November 19, 2015
- Leader: Thomas Mulcair
- Preceded by: Peggy Nash
- Succeeded by: Lisa Raitt

Opposition House Leader
- In office April 20, 2012 – March 20, 2014
- Leader: Thomas Mulcair
- Preceded by: Joe Comartin
- Succeeded by: Peter Julian

Member of Parliament for Skeena—Bulkley Valley
- In office June 28, 2004 – September 11, 2019
- Preceded by: Andy Burton
- Succeeded by: Taylor Bachrach

Personal details
- Born: Nathan Paul Cullen; July 13, 1972 (age 54) Toronto, Ontario, Canada
- Party: New Democratic
- Spouse: Diana Dahr Cullen
- Children: 2
- Education: Trent University (BA)
- Occupation: Private consultant

Nathan Paul Cullen (born July 13, 1972) is a Canadian politician who served as a member of the Legislative Assembly of British Columbia (MLA) representing the riding of Stikine from 2020 to 2024 as a member of the New Democratic Party and served in the Executive Council of British Columbia from 2020 to 2024.

Prior to entering provincial politics, Cullen served federally as a member of Parliament (MP) representing the riding of Skeena—Bulkley Valley from 2004 to 2019. He stood in the 2012 New Democratic Party leadership election, where he came in third. During the 41st Parliament, Cullen was the House Leader for the Official Opposition and then Finance critic in Thomas Mulcair's Shadow Cabinet.

In 2025, Cullen joined public affairs consulting firm StrategyCorp.

== Early life ==
Born and raised in Toronto, Ontario, Cullen worked in several countries in Central and South America, during the 1990s, on community economic development projects. Cullen has described himself as a descendant of Jewish people. He moved to Smithers, British Columbia in 1998 and started a private consulting business focussed on strategic planning and conflict resolution. While working in Latin America, Cullen learned Spanish and named his company Maravilla Consultants after the town (the Spanish word for wonder) in Costa Rica in which he worked.

Cullen completed high school at Martingrove Collegiate Institute in Toronto, and graduated from Trent University in Peterborough, Ontario in 1994, with a bachelor of arts (honours) in international development studies and environmental studies.

== Federal politics ==
=== 38th Parliament ===
At the age of 31, in the June 2004 federal election, Cullen was elected to his first term as a Member of Parliament. He had won the NDP nomination in the Skeena—Bulkley Valley riding three months earlier against a Prince Rupert social worker. In the general election, he challenged the Conservative incumbent Andy Burton, Liberal Miles Richardson who was chair of the BC Treaty Commission, Rod Taylor of the Christian Heritage Party, engineer and photographer Roger Benham of the Green Party and Marxist-Leninist Frank Martin. The election was seen as a tight three-way race between Burton, Richardson, and Cullen. Cullen made support of the federal moratorium on offshore oil and gas drilling part of his campaign and a magnitude 6.7 earthquake off Haida Gwaii during the campaign helped highlight Cullen's arguments. Cullen went on to defeat the Conservative incumbent Burton by a margin of 1,272 votes. Cullen was the youngest of 19 New Democratic Party candidates elected to the 38th Parliament.

He became the party's national critic for youth issues, the environment and national parks. He continued to support the moratorium on offshore oil and gas drilling despite Prime-Minister Paul Martin opening a cabinet level review of the moratorium; the review ended with the conclusion that lifting the moratorium was too politically divisive.

By the end of 2004, he was voted "Favourite Up-and-Comer Rookie Politician" by fellow Members of Parliament. He was also awarded the US Ambassador's Award as one of only two Canadian recipients. In the first half of 2005, Cullen toured western provinces with other MPs to promote a private member's bill (Bill C-261) which would lower the voting age to 16. In February he made a motion in the House of Commons to "recognize the public health impacts of smog" and require improved emission standards of light duty vehicles sold in Canada, though it was not supported by the Liberal Party or Conservative Party. In the fall, Cullen challenged the Minister of the Environment Stéphane Dion to take a blood test to illustrate the level of toxins present in the environment. He also spent time lobbying the Liberal government to publicly disclose the bids for Ridley Terminal; the proposed sale of the Prince Rupert Port Authority coal loading terminals by the federal government to a private firm was criticized by opposition parties as undervaluing the facility and likely to restrict fair access by competing coal companies. The sale was ultimately blocked by the Conservative Party after they won the subsequent election.

=== 39th Parliament ===
In the 2006 election, Cullen faced a strong challenge from the Conservative Party candidate and former MP Mike Scott (who had represented Skeena from 1993 to 2000). Scott ran an aggressive campaign attacking the Liberal candidate, filing a request with Elections Canada for an investigation into Cullen's campaign finances, and using signage saying "Re-elect Scott", despite the fact that Cullen was the incumbent. Cullen was effective at forcing Scott to defend issues from his time in office during the 1990s while Scott made Cullen defend his vote to support the Canadian Firearms Registry despite promising to vote against it. Cullen went on to win by an unexpectedly large margin, 15%, over Scott.

In April 2006, Cullen introduced a Private Member's Bill (Phthalate Control Act Bill C-307) to ban phthalates, a chemical in many plastics, from products intended for infants and toddlers. The bill passed through all stages in the House of Commons but died on the order paper in the Senate when the 39th Parliament was dissolved. The proposal was subsequently adopted by Government and in June 2009 new regulations were introduced to place restrictions on six phthalates.

As Environment Critic for the NDP, Cullen sat on the committee that largely re-wrote the Government's Clean Air Act (C-30). The new act was called the Clean Air and Climate Change Act (Bill C-468). The Government refused to reintroduce the bill after Cullen's revisions and the act died on the order paper in the House.

=== 40th Parliament ===
Following the 2008 election, Cullen was named the New Democrat Critic for Natural Resources and Energy. In this role he chaired the NDP's Green Economy Taskforce, working on ways to help create employment while meeting our responsibilities to the planet's future generations and promoted sustainable energy development through a study of Canada's Energy Security at the House of Commons Standing Committee on Natural Resources. Cullen also led an NDP effort to secure a bulk oil tanker ban on the north coast of British Columbia which led to the passage in the House of Commons of a motion calling for such a ban by a close vote of 143–138.

In 2009 Cullen created a contest in his constituency called Create Your Canada which challenges students between grades 5 and 12 to submit proposals for federal legislation. Two winners are picked each year and are flown to Ottawa to watch their submissions introduced in the House of Commons as private member's bills. In 2009, two bills were introduced: Bill C-399, which proposed a ban on the mining and export of asbestos; and Bill C-400, which encouraged the Government of Canada to support the development of cycling friendly infrastructure.

=== 41st Parliament ===
In 2011, Cullen was elected for a fourth term with 55% of all votes cast— the highest plurality in the riding since 1962. In the 41st Parliament, Cullen served as Chair of the House of Commons Standing Committee on Privacy, Access to Information and Ethics. He was also the Associate Critic for Natural Resources, Aboriginal Affairs and Northern Development, and Environment and Sustainable Development before resigning from his roles to participate in the NDP leadership race. The 2013 Hill Times Annual Most Valuable Politician & All Politics Poll awarded Cullen 3rd place in the "Best Up-and-comer MP" category, tied with Elizabeth May.

==== NDP leadership race ====
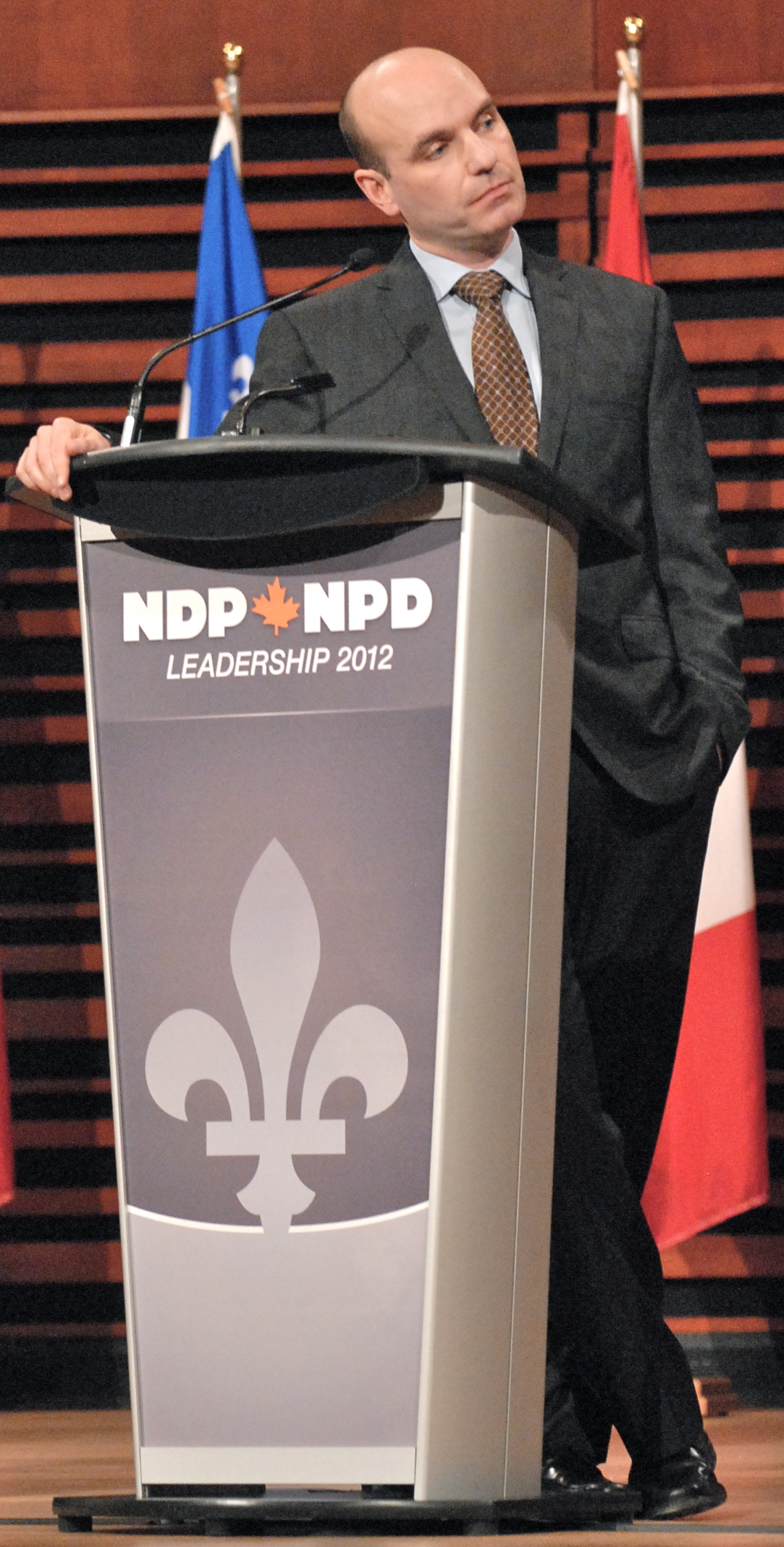
Nathan Cullen during a candidates debate on February 12, 2012 in Québec

Following the death of party leader Jack Layton, the NDP began a leadership race. Cullen announced his official candidacy on September 30, 2011. In his opening speech, Cullen stated his vision for a new and progressive kind of politics, saying "now's the time for an honest discussion about the direction our politics is going in...and how we must change it for the better." Cullen also argued the choice between the economy and the environment is unnecessary, but that a green economy is a balance between creating jobs and protecting the environment. He cast himself as a pro-business candidate.

Cullen proposed that joint primary nominations should take place in Conservative-held ridings to determine the best possible local candidate to avoid vote splitting among 'progressives'. Cullen is suggesting that each constituency association would have the choice of whether or not to run their respective campaign in this way, and that there would be no "top-down" directive to do so. In his policy papers thus far, Cullen has also advanced a number of other ideas such as: creating a national public transit strategy, instituting carbon cap-and-trade pricing, putting a moratorium on new genetically modified organisms, redefining the Canadian Wheat Board, and holding a referendum on voting reform (Cullen supports mixed-member proportional representation as currently used in New Zealand and Germany).

Observers and commentators noted that Cullen's performances in the debates increased his profile. Whereas at the beginning of the race Cullen was considered one of the "also-rans", he eventually was given considerably more attention, with the CBC, The Globe and Mail, Toronto Star, and National Post all running articles on his candidacy.

On the day of the convention, Cullen surprised many by placing third in the first round of voting with 16% of the vote, behind with Thomas Mulcair and Brian Topp in first and second respectively (30% for Mulcair, 21% for Topp). He continued to hold third place after the second and third counts, eventually being eliminated at the third count with 24.6% of the votes (Mulcair had 43% of the vote, Topp had 31%). He declined to endorse another candidate.

==== House Leader for the Official Opposition ====
On April 20, 2012 Cullen was named House Leader for the Official Opposition in Thomas Mulcair's first Shadow Cabinet Shuffle. Cullen replaced long time Ontario MP Joe Comartin as House Leader, with Comartin being named Critic for Democratic Reform.

==== Finance Critic for the Official Opposition ====
On March 20, 2014, Cullen replaced Peggy Nash as Finance Critic for the Official Opposition just days after former Natural Resources minister Joe Oliver was named Minister of Finance. Upon taking up the post, Cullen emphasized his previous occupation as a small business owner in northern British Columbia against Oliver's previous career as a Merrill Lynch executive and promised to bring a "Main Street" perspective to challenge Oliver's "Bay Street" background. In March 2015, Cullen attacked Joe Oliver over his avoidance of Question Period after repeated delays in introducing the budget after the drop in oil prices.

On September 23, 2014, Cullen tabled Bill C-628 (short-titled An Act to Defend the Pacific Northwest) in the House of Commons, which would ban supertankers from the Queen Charlotte Sound, the Hecate Strait and the Dixon Entrance, as well as modify the National Energy Board Act to require any pipeline review to take into account the impact of any proposal on employment in the refining and upgrading sectors, and require the National Energy Board to deepen its consultations with communities and First Nations. The bill was a response to the National Energy Board's approval of the Enbridge Northern Gateway pipeline.

As part of the Take Back Our Coast campaign, Cullen toured dozens of communities around British Columbia's north, interior, lower mainland and across Vancouver Island promoting Bill C-628 and raising awareness about the potential impacts of a pipeline or supertanker spill from Northern Gateway on fisheries, tourism and communities. On April 1, 2015, the bill came to a vote at second reading in the House of Commons, and was defeated by a count of 141–120, with all government MPs voting against.

On November 22, 2014, Cullen was named Most Knowledgeable Parliamentarian at the Maclean's Magazine Parliamentarian of the Year Awards in Ottawa, edging out Prime Minister Stephen Harper, who placed second in votes.

=== 42nd Parliament ===
After the 2015 election, Cullen was appointed the NDP critic for Environment and Climate Change and Democratic Reform in the 42nd Parliament.

As critic for Democratic Institutions, Cullen took the lead in criticizing the government's plans for electoral reform, and in particular for the Special Committee on Electoral Reform. The government ultimately reversed course, and instead backed Cullen's motion for the composition of the committee. Cullen was subsequently named to the committee, and serves as vice-chair.

Cullen announced on March 1, 2019, that he would not run for re-election in that year's federal election.

== Provincial politics ==
On January 27, 2020, Cullen was appointed by the Government of British Columbia as the liaison between the province and the Wetʼsuwetʼen hereditary chiefs. Cullen's appointment came in the midst of the 2020 Canadian pipeline and railway protests, after the hereditary chiefs refused to meet with BC Minister of Indigenous Relations Scott Fraser.

In the lead up to the 2020 British Columbia general election, Cullen announced his intention to seek the nomination for the BC NDP in the riding of Stikine, essentially the northern portion of his federal riding. His candidacy became the subject of controversy when he was acclaimed by the party one week after Annita McPhee, a former elected president of the Tahltan Nation, announced she was seeking the nomination for the riding. The BC NDP has an equity policy whereby a male MLA has to be replaced by a member of an equity-seeking group, such as a woman or a First Nations person, when he retires. The party claimed that McPhee's application contained invalid signatures, and that the local riding association conducted a search for candidates to meet its equity policy but none were willing to stand. McPhee asked Nathan Cullen to step down from seeking the nomination for that riding because of the party's equity policy but Cullen refused. Despite the controversy, Cullen was elected with 51.7% of the vote.

On November 26, 2020, Cullen was sworn in to the Executive Council of British Columbia as Minister of State for Lands and Resource Operations. On February 25, 2022 he was appointed Minister of Municipal Affairs. He was subsequently named Minister of Water, Land and Resource Stewardship and Minister Responsible for Fisheries in the Eby ministry on December 7, 2022.

In the 2024 British Columbia general election, he was unseated by Sharon Hartwell from the Conservative Party of British Columbia.

Cullen endorsed Alberta MP Heather McPherson in the 2026 New Democratic Party leadership election.

== Personal life ==
Nathan Cullen and Diana Dahr met in Smithers through their work with Katimavik, and they were engaged by the end of 2004. On August 6, 2010, they became parents of twin boys at Mills Memorial Hospital.

== Election results ==
=== Provincial elections ===
2020 British Columbia general election: Stikine
Party	Candidate	Votes	%	±%	Expenditures
New Democratic	Nathan Cullen	3,745	51.77	−0.33	$32,249.48
Liberal	Gordon Sebastian	1,904	26.32	-12.43	$25,199.00
Christian Heritage	Rod Taylor	831	11.49	+2.34	$11,622.14
Rural	Darcy Repen	754	10.42	–	$1,115.05
Total valid votes		7,234	99.26	–	
Total rejected ballots		54	0.74	+0.06	
Turnout		7,288	50.13	−15.48	
Registered voters		14,537			
Source: Elections BC

2024 British Columbia general election: Bulkley Valley-Stikine
Party	Candidate	Votes	%	±%	Expenditures
Conservative	Sharon Hartwell	4,992	52.31	–	$34,154.30
New Democratic	Nathan Cullen	3,709	38.86	−12.91	$42,557.85
Green	Gamlakyeltxw Wilhelm Marsden	604	6.33	–	$889.70
Christian Heritage	Rod Taylor	239	2.50	−8.98	$8,901.96
Total valid votes/expense limit		9,544	99.74	–	$71,700.08
Total rejected ballots		25	0.26	–	
Turnout		9,569	64.24	+14.11	
Registered voters		14,895			
Conservative gain from New Democratic		Swing		+32.61	
Source: Elections BC

=== Federal elections ===
2004 Canadian federal election: Skeena—Bulkley Valley
Party	Candidate	Votes	%	Expenditures
New Democratic	Nathan Cullen	13,706	37.14	$46,675.74
Conservative	Andy Burton	12,434	33.70	$53,836.90
Liberal	Miles Richardson	7,965	21.59	$78,223.05
Christian Heritage	Rod Taylor	1,408	3.82	$15,037.75
Green	Roger Benham	1,225	3.32	$584.67
Marxist–Leninist	Frank Martin	161	0.44	$716.64
Total valid votes/expense limit		36,899	99.62	$88,951.13
Total rejected ballots		140	0.38	
Turnout		37,039	59.99	
Eligible voters		61,747		
This riding was created from Skeena, Prince George—Bulkley Valley and Cariboo—Chilcotin, which each elected a Canadian Alliance candidate in the last election. Andy Burton was the incumbent from Skeena.
Source: Elections Canada

2006 Canadian federal election: Skeena—Bulkley Valley
Party	Candidate	Votes	%	±%	Expenditures
New Democratic	Nathan Cullen	18,496	48.33	+11.19	$90,616.95
Conservative	Mike Scott	12,630	33.00	–0.70	$70,134.23
Liberal	Gordon Stamp-Vincent	4,845	12.66	–8.93	$19,599.28
Christian Heritage	Rod Taylor	1,235	3.23	–0.59	$23,916.63
Green	Phil Brienesse	1,064	2.78	–0.54	$752.93
Total valid votes/expense limit		38,270	99.68	–	$91,309.40
Total rejected ballots		122	0.32	–0.06	
Turnout		38,392	63.13	+3.15	
Eligible voters		60,810			
New Democratic hold		Swing		+5.95	
Source: Elections Canada

2008 Canadian federal election: Skeena—Bulkley Valley
Party	Candidate	Votes	%	±%	Expenditures
New Democratic	Nathan Cullen	17,219	49.84	+1.51	$67,662.50
Conservative	Sharon Smith	12,561	36.36	+3.36	$78,613.40
Liberal	Corinna Morhart	1,916	5.55	–7.11	$11,630.98
Green	Hondo Arendt	1,613	4.67	+1.89	$507.00
Christian Heritage	Rod Taylor	1,125	3.26	+0.03	$28,304.38
Canadian Action	Mary-Etta Goodacre	112	0.32	–	none listed
Total valid votes/expense limit		34,546	99.69	–	$97,940.79
Total rejected ballots		106	0.31	–0.01	
Turnout		34,652	56.51	–6.62	
Eligible voters		61,318			
New Democratic hold		Swing		–0.92	
Source: Elections Canada

2011 Canadian federal election: Skeena—Bulkley Valley
Party	Candidate	Votes	%	±%	Expenditures
New Democratic	Nathan Cullen	19,431	55.33	+5.48	$70,349.44
Conservative	Clay Harmon	12,117	34.50	–1.86	$61,759.81
Liberal	Kyle Warwick	1,268	3.61	–1.94	$4,426.78
Green	Roger Benham	1,102	3.14	–1.53	$23.41
Christian Heritage	Rod Taylor	1,038	2.96	–0.30	$22,505.12
Canadian Action	Maggie Hope Braun	165	0.47	+0.15	$645.06
Total valid votes/expense limit		35,121	99.67	–	$101,294.56
Total rejected ballots		116	0.33	+0.02	
Turnout		35,237	57.72	+1.21	
Eligible voters		61,043			
New Democratic hold		Swing		+3.67	
Source: Elections Canada

2015 Canadian federal election: Skeena—Bulkley Valley
Party	Candidate	Votes	%	±%	Expenditures
New Democratic	Nathan Cullen	22,531	51.08	–4.14	$64,149.53
Conservative	Tyler Nesbitt	10,936	24.79	–9.77	$56,390.26
Liberal	Brad Layton	8,257	18.72	+15.11	$8,778.94
Green	Jeannie Parnell	1,605	3.64	+0.44	none listed
Christian Heritage	Don Spratt	780	1.77	–1.19	$20,710.97
Total valid votes/expense limit		44,109	99.65	–	$247,884.67
Total rejected ballots		157	0.35	+0.03	
Turnout		44,266	68.26	+10.54	
Eligible voters		64,846			
New Democratic hold		Swing		+2.81	
Source: Elections Canada
