= Taylor Bachrach =

Canadian politician

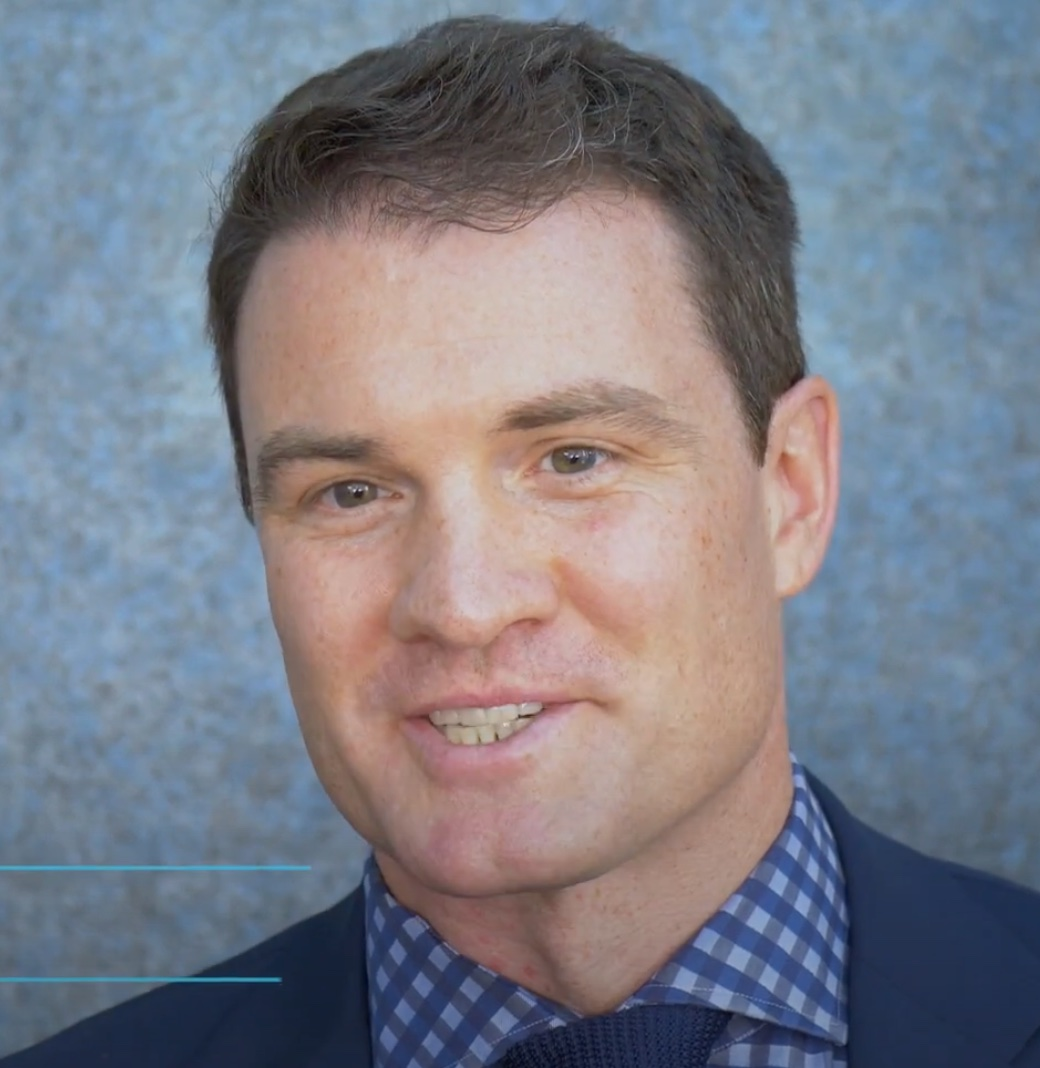
- Bachrach in 2019

Member of Parliament for Skeena—Bulkley Valley
- In office October 21, 2019 – April 28, 2025
- Preceded by: Nathan Cullen
- Succeeded by: Ellis Ross

Mayor of Smithers
- In office November 19, 2011 – November 3, 2019
- Preceded by: Cress Farrow
- Succeeded by: Gladys Atrill

Personal details
- Born: 1978 (age 47–48)
- Party: New Democratic
- Spouse: Michelle Bachrach
- Children: 2
- Occupation: Politician; businessman

Taylor Bachrach (born 1978) is a Canadian politician and businessman who served as the member of Parliament (MP) representing the riding of Skeena—Bulkley Valley in the House of Commons from 2019 to 2025 as a member of the New Democratic Party. Prior to federal politics, he served as the mayor of Smithers from 2011 to 2019 and municipal councilor in the village of Telkwa from 2008 to 2011.

== Political career ==
Bachrach's started his political career in the village of Telkwa where be became a municipal councilor in 2008 and later went on to become the mayor of Smithers in 2011. He served as mayor until 2019, winning reelection twice, before his turning his career into federal politics.

At the 2019 Canadian federal election, Skeena—Bulkley Valley was an open seat as its MP, Nathan Cullen, chose not to seek re-election. Bachrach won the party's nomination and subsequently held the seat for the NDP. He resigned as mayor of Smithers on November 3, 2019, to assume his new role as MP. After he was elected federally, NDP leader Jagmeet Singh named him to be the party's critic for Infrastructure and Communities in the 43rd Canadian Parliament.

After his re-election in the 2021 Canadian federal election, Bachrach became the critic for Transport and deputy critic for Infrastructure and Communities. On December 13, 2021, Bachrach tabled Bill C-210, the Right to Vote at 16 Act, which would amend the Canada Elections Act to lower the federal voting age in Canada from 18 to 16 years of age. On December 13, 2023, he tabled Bill C-371, the Rail Passenger Priority Act, which would amend the Canada Transportation Act to give passenger trains priority over freight rail. Following the adjournment of the House of Commons for the holiday season, Bachrach embarked on The Canadian to learn more about and promote passenger rail in Canada.

In the 2025 federal election, Bachrach was defeated by Conservative candidate Ellis Ross.

== Personal life ==
Bachrach and his wife, Michelle, have two daughters, Ella and Maddie. He lives in Smithers. Outside politics, Bachrach owned a communications business, Bachrach Communications. He also served as the director of communications for the British Columbia chapter of the Sierra Club of Canada.

== Electoral record ==
=== Federal ===
2025 Canadian federal election: Skeena—Bulkley Valley
** Preliminary results — Not yet official **
Party	Candidate	Votes	%	±%	Expenditures
Conservative	Ellis Ross	21,202	47.18	+11.04	
New Democratic	Taylor Bachrach	17,682	39.35	–3.23	
Liberal	Inderpal Dhillon	4,924	10.96	+3.30	
Christian Heritage	Rod Taylor	602	1.34	–0.79	
Green	Adeana Young	528	1.17	–2.59	
Total valid votes/expense limit					
Total rejected ballots					
Turnout		44,938	64.98		
Eligible voters		69,154			
Conservative gain from New Democratic		Swing		+7.14	
Source: Elections Canada

2021 Canadian federal election: Skeena—Bulkley Valley
Party	Candidate	Votes	%	±%	Expenditures
New Democratic	Taylor Bachrach	15,921	42.58	+1.68	$63,480.61
Conservative	Claire Rattée	13,513	36.14	+2.94	$70,700.48
People's	Jody Craven	2,888	7.72	+5.42	$0.00
Liberal	Lakhwinder Jhaj	2,866	7.66	–3.94	$3,828.51
Green	Adeana Young	1,406	3.76	–4.14	$8,424.51
Christian Heritage	Rod Taylor	797	2.13	–1.17	$22,278.11
Total valid votes/expense limit		37,391	99.49	–	$131,940.03
Total rejected ballots		193	0.51	–0.10	
Turnout		37,584	55.72	–6.98	
Eligible voters		67,453			
New Democratic hold		Swing		–0.63	
Source: Elections Canada

2019 Canadian federal election: Skeena—Bulkley Valley
Party	Candidate	Votes	%	±%	Expenditures
New Democratic	Taylor Bachrach	16,944	40.9	-10.18	$95,825.47
Conservative	Claire Rattée	13,756	33.2	+8.41	$58,121.59
Liberal	Dave Birdi	4,793	11.6	-7.12	$33,859.91
Green	Mike Sawyer	3,280	7.9	+4.26	$7,326.84
Christian Heritage	Rod Taylor	1,350	3.3	+1.53	$23,458.48
People's	Jody Craven	940	2.3	–	$5,358.59
Independent	Danny Nunes	164	0.4	–	none listed
Independent	Merv Ritchie	157	0.4	–	none listed
Total valid votes/expense limit		41,384	100.0		
Total rejected ballots		267	0.61		
Turnout		41,651	62.7		
Eligible voters		66,421			
New Democratic hold		Swing		-9.30	
Source: Elections Canada

=== Municipal ===
2018 Smithers mayoral election
Mayoral candidate	Vote	%
Taylor Bachrach (X)	1,137	64.02
Randy Bell	639	35.98

2014 Smithers mayoral election
Candidate	Vote	%
Taylor Bachrach (X)	Acclaimed	

2011 Smithers mayoral election
Candidate	Vote	%
Taylor Bachrach	896	58.52
Cress Farrow (X)	635	41.48
