= Roumieu =

The surname Roumieu may refer to:

- David Roumieu (born 1981), retired French professional rugby union player
- Graham Roumieu, Canadian illustrator
- Robert Lewis Roumieu (1814–1877), also known as R.L. Roumieu, Victorian architect in London
- Reginald St Aubyn Roumieu (1854–1921), also known as R St A Roumieu, architect and son of Robert Lewis Roumieu
