= Dennis MacKay =

Canadian politician (1942–2024)

Member of the British Columbia Legislative Assembly for Bulkley Valley-Stikine
- In office May 16, 2001 – May 12, 2009
- Preceded by: Bill Goodacre
- Succeeded by: Doug Donaldson

Personal details
- Born: March 23, 1942 Edmonton, Alberta, Canada
- Died: August 14, 2024 (aged 82) Smithers, British Columbia, Canada
- Party: Liberal

Dennis MacKay (March 23, 1942 – August 14, 2024) was a Canadian politician, who represented the electoral district of Bulkley Valley-Stikine in the Legislative Assembly of British Columbia from 2001 to 2009.

MacKay moved into the riding in 1981. Before becoming an MLA, MacKay worked as a private investigator, a provincial coroner, and a security patrol agent. He served with the Royal Canadian Mounted Police (RCMP) for more than 30 years, including two years with the RCMP's Musical Ride. He died in Smithers on August 14, 2024, at the age of 82.

== Election results ==
2001 British Columbia general election: Bulkley Valley-Stikine
| Party | Candidate | Votes | % | ±% | Expenditures |
|---|---|---|---|---|---|
| Liberal | Dennis MacKay | 7,414 | 55.93 | +27.06 | $44,836 |
| New Democratic | Bill Goodacre | 2,823 | 21.29 | −15.73 | $30,795 |
| Unity | Rod Taylor | 1,190 | 8.98 | – | $11,169 |
| Green | Rolf Hussinger | 856 | 6.46 | +5.29 | $3,693 |
| Marijuana | Trevor McKilligan | 507 | 3.82 | – | $582 |
| All Nations | Theresa Tait | 405 | 3.05 | – | $5,540 |
| Citizens Alliance | Bill Forsyth | 62 | 0.47 | – | – |
| Total valid votes | | 13,257 | 100.00 | | |
| Total rejected ballots | | 44 | 0.33 | | |
| Turnout | | 13,301 | 73.28 | | |

2005 British Columbia general election: Bulkley Valley-Stikine
| Party | Candidate | Votes | % | Expenditures |
|---|---|---|---|---|
| Liberal | Dennis MacKay | 6,279 | 48.30 | $96,735 |
| New Democratic | Doug Donaldson | 5,177 | 39.82 | $50,561 |
| Green | Leanna Mitchell | 769 | 5.91 | $3,466 |
| Democratic Reform | Nipper Kettle | 354 | 2.72 | $2,899 |
| Marijuana | Reginald Bruce Gunanoot | 205 | 1.58 | $100 |
| British Columbia Party | Jack Kortmeyer | 175 | 1.35 | $344 |
| People's Front | Frank Martin | 41 | 0.32 | $540 |
| Total valid votes | | 13,000 | 100 | |
| Total rejected ballots | | 60 | 0.46 | |
| Turnout | | 13,060 | 68.78 | |
