= Alicia Kaye =

Canadian-American triathlete

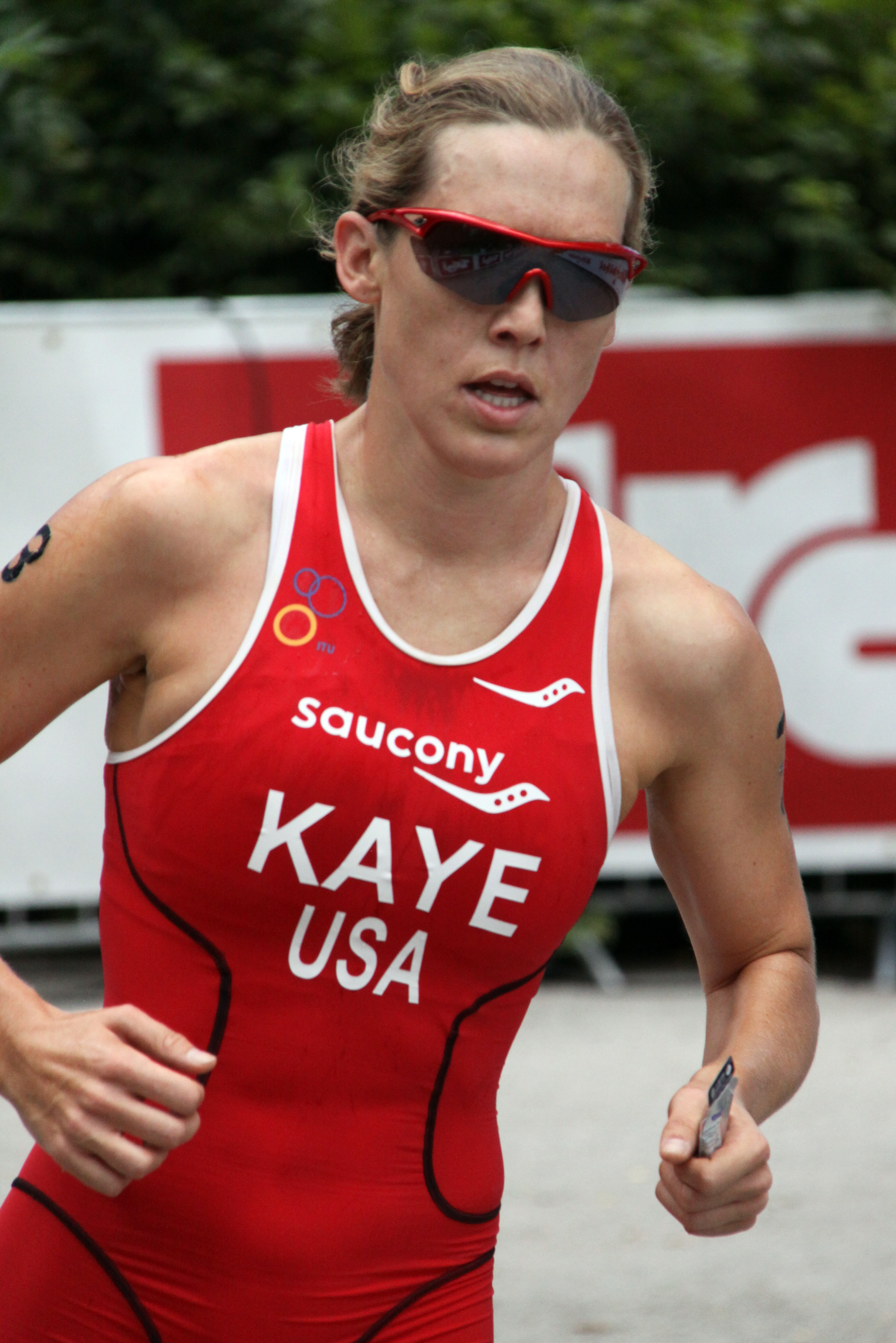
Alicia Kaye at the World Championship Series triathlon in Kitzbühel, 2010.

Alicia Beth Kaye (born October 7, 1983 in Smithers, British Columbia) is a Canadian-American professional triathlete and Member of the USA Triathlon Project 2012 program.

Alicia Kaye started her international elite career at the age of 16, placing 14th at the World Cup in Corner Brook. Since 2010 she represents the United States.

In 2010, Alicia Kaye also took part in the prestigious French Club Championship Series Lyonnaise des Eaux representing Tri Club Châteuaroux 36, a club which relies exclusively on foreign guest stars. At the Triathlon de Paris (18 July 2010) and at Tourangeaux (29 August 2010) she placed 18th and 11th respectively, thus being among the three triathlètes classants l'équipe. In the official rankings her nationality is indicated as French.

More recently, Kaye on Ironman 70.3 races in Calgary, St. George, and Boulder in 2015. She placed 5th in the 2015 Ironman 70.3 World Championship.

Alicia Kaye is married with Jarrod Shoemaker. She holds an undergraduate degree in sport psychology and a master's degree in athletic counselling (2009).

== ITU Competitions ==
The following list is based upon the official ITU rankings and the athlete's Profile Page. Unless indicated otherwise, the following competitions are triathlons and belong to the Elite category.

| Date | Competition | Place | Rank |
|---|---|---|---|
| 2000-04-30 | World Championships (Junior) | Perth | 21 |
| 2000-07-30 | World Cup | Corner Brook | 14 |
| 2001-04-28 | World Cup | St. Anthony's | 18 |
| 2001-07-07 | World Cup | Toronto | 26 |
| 2001-07-22 | World Championship (Junior) | Edmonton | 22 |
| 2001-07-29 | World Cup | Corner Brook | 13 |
| 2002-11-09 | World Championships (Junior) | Cancun | 17 |
| 2005-06-12 | Caribbean Cup | Rincon | 5 |
| 2005-07-10 | Pan American Cup | New York | 12 |
| 2005-07-17 | World Cup | Corner Brook | 13 |
| 2005-09-10 | World Championships (U23) | Gamagori | 19 |
| 2006-05-27 | Pan American Cup | Ixtapa | 2 |
| 2006-07-02 | Pan American Cup | Brampton | 6 |
| 2006-07-09 | BG World Cup | Edmonton | 28 |
| 2006-07-23 | BG World Cup | Corner Brook | DNF |
| 2006-07-30 | BG World Cup | Salford | DNS |
| 2006-08-05 | Pan American Cup | Bridgeport | 7 |
| 2006-08-13 | BG World Cup | Tiszaújváros | 40 |
| 2006-09-02 | World Championships (U23) | Lausanne | 20 |
| 2006-09-17 | Pan American Cup | Rye Westchester | 7 |
| 2006-11-05 | BG World Cup | Cancun | 53 |
| 2007-06-24 | BG World Cup | Edmonton | 29 |
| 2007-07-14 | Pan American Cup | Geneva | 5 |
| 2007-08-05 | Pan American Cup | Drummondville | 4 |
| 2007-08-19 | Pan American Cup | Kelowna | 4 |
| 2007-10-07 | BG World Cup | Rhodes | DNF |
| 2007-11-04 | BG World Cup | Cancun | 23 |
| 2007-12-01 | BG World Cup | Eilat | 37 |
| 2008-04-19 | PATCO Pan American Championship | Mazatlan | 5 |
| 2008-07-12 | Pan American Cup | Musselman | 3 |
| 2009-08-23 | Pan American Cup | Kelowna | 5 |
| 2009-11-08 | World Cup | Huatulco | 14 |
| 2010-03-20 | Pan American Cup | Mazatlan | DNF |
| 2010-04-04 | Pan American Cup and South American Championships | Lima | 1 |
| 2010-04-18 | World Cup | Monterrey | 7 |
| 2010-05-08 | Dextro Energy World Championship Series | Seoul | 25 |
| 2010-06-05 | Dextro Energy World Championship Series | Madrid | 43 |
| 2010-06-12 | Elite Cup | Hy-Vee | 21 |
| 2010-07-24 | Dextro Energy World Championship Series | London | 37 |
| 2010-08-14 | Dextro Energy World Championship Series | Kitzbuhel | 44 |
| 2010-08-21 | Sprint World Championship | Lausanne | 14 |
| 2010-09-08 | Dextro Energy World Championship Series: Grand Final | Budapest | 45 |
| 2010-10-17 | PATCO Pan American Championships | Puerto Vallarta | 11 |

BG = the sponsor British Gas · DNS = did not start · DNF = did not finish

== Commercials ==
Alicia Kaye was involved in the creation of the Copper Relief commercial
