= Peter Capak =

Physicist

Peter Lawrence Capak
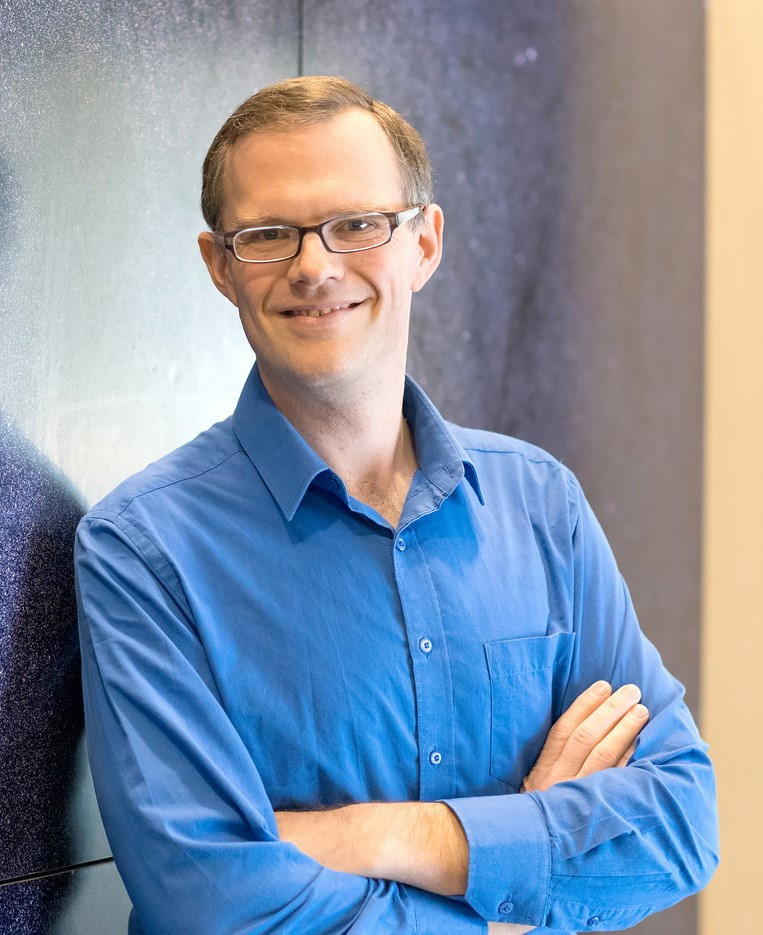
- Education: University of Hawaii at Manoa; University of British Columbia
- Known for: Cosmology, Structure Formation, Dark Matter, Dark Energy Galaxy Evolution
- Scientific career
- Fields: Astronomy, Machine Learning, Space Sciences
- Workplaces: Facebook Reality Labs; California Institute of Technology; Cosmic DAWN Center
- Website: petercapak.com

Peter Lawrence Capak is a Canadian astrophysicist and technology researcher. His current focus is developing machine perception technologies, sensors, displays, and compute architectures for the next generation of augmented (AR), mixed (MR) and virtual reality (VR) systems. His research has focused on using physical modeling and advanced statistical methods including artificial intelligence and machine learning to extract information from very large multi-wavelength (hyper-spectral) data sets. He has primarily used this to study structure formation in the universe, cosmology, and the nature of dark matter and dark energy.

== Early life and education ==
Capak grew up in a rural area near Smithers, British Columbia, Canada, where he graduated from Smithers Secondary School. He received his bachelor of science in physics and astronomy with honors from the University of British Columbia in 1999. He then earned a masters in astronomy in 2002, and a Ph.D. in astronomy in 2004 both from the University of Hawaii. In his Ph.D. thesis, he focused on measuring the growth of structure and history of star formation in the universe using several data sets including the GOODS survey.

== Scientific career ==
Capak was a senior research scientist and lead of the SPHEREx science center at the Infrared Processing and Analysis Center (IPAC), Caltech and a member of the NASA Euclid Science Center at IPAC. He previously was a member of the Spitzer Science Center where he led the Spitzer Enhanced Imaging Products pipeline team and the Spitzer Frontiers Field Initiative. He was also a principal investigator on the Spitzer Large Area Survey with Hyper-Suprime-Cam (SPLASH) project.

Capak joined Caltech in 2004 to work on the COSMOS project where he led the multi-wavelength data processing and analysis effort. He developed a way of estimating redshifts from photometry (photometric redshifts) that accounted for the signal strength of weak lensing, enabling the first 3-dimensional map of dark matter. He subsequently led the development of new technique based on manifold learning that significantly reduced the number of observations required to calibrate photometric redshifts for dark energy measurements. This made it practical to carry out the calibration observations in a reasonable amount of time on the Keck and VLT telescopes with the C3R2 survey. Capak has also worked on improving galaxy modeling techniques using more advanced statistical methods and machine learning including leading the development of the fitting pipeline for the SPHEREx mission.

In 2010, Capak took over leadership of the COSMOS collaboration which he led until 2018. The COSMOS data set helped to develop the concept behind several experiments to measure the properties of dark matter and dark energy including the Dark Universe Explorer (DUNE), which was incorporated into the Euclid mission. Capak consulted on the design of NASA's Wide Field Infrared Survey Telescope (later renamed the Nancy Grace Roman Space Telescope). He was also a co-investigator on the team that developed NASA's SPHEREx mission.

Capak's work has been featured in the media including his work on Abell 520, the Baby Boom Galaxy. He also discovered the most distant known cluster of galaxies and carried out the first large study of the interstellar medium in the distant universe. In 2017-2019, he was identified as one of the top 1% of cited researchers in space sciences. Capak became an associate of the Cosmic Dawn Center (DAWN) in 2017. in Copenhagen, Denmark.

== Technology ==
Since 2020, Capak has been the Architect of Perception Systems at the Oculus division of Facebook.
