= Jackie Pement =

Canadian politician (born 1946)

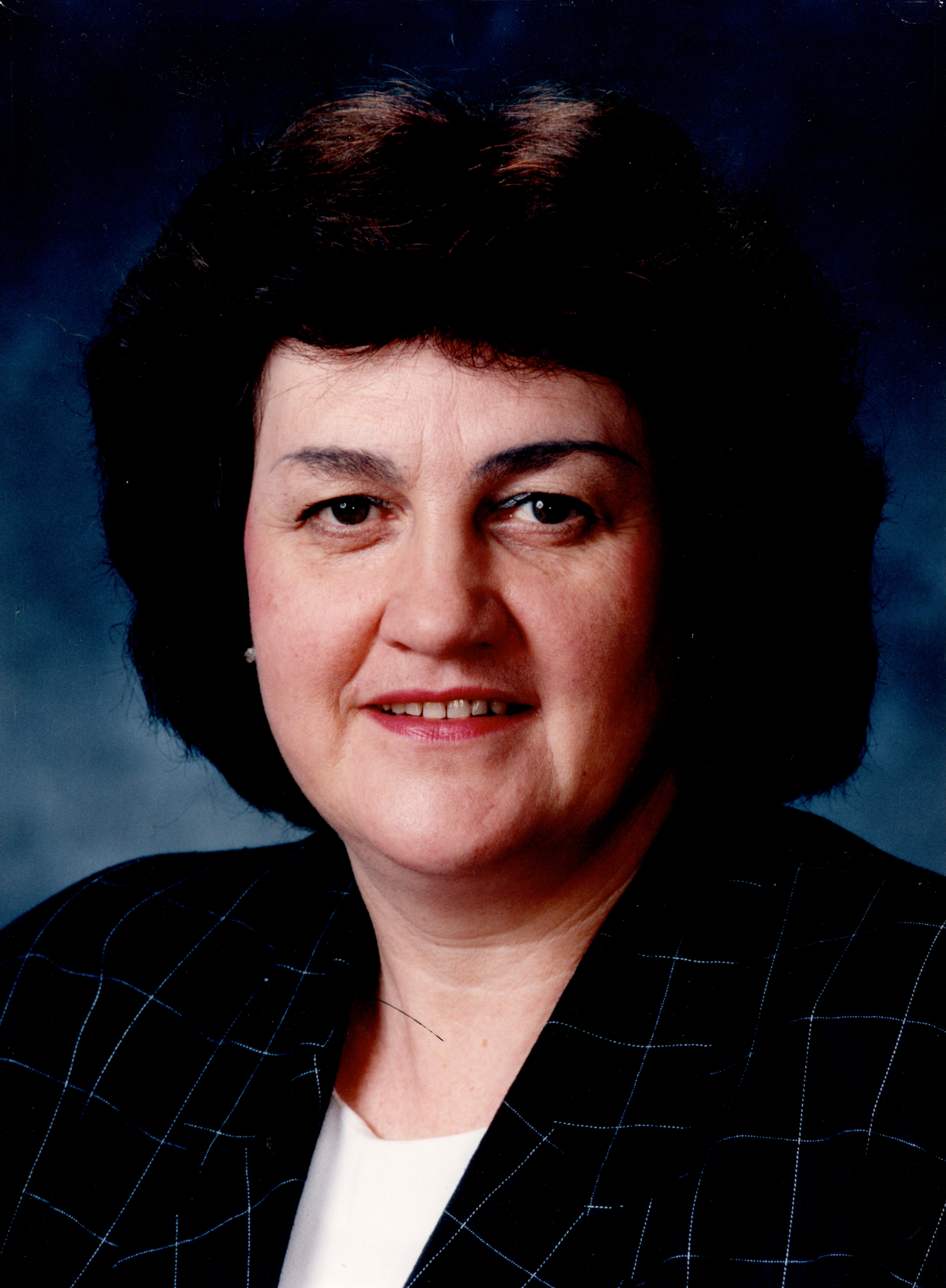

Member of the British Columbia Legislative Assembly for Bulkley Valley-Stikine
- In office October 17, 1991 – May 28, 1996
- Preceded by: Larry Guno
- Succeeded by: Bill Goodacre

Minister of Transportation and Highways of British Columbia
- In office September 15, 1993 – February 22, 1996
- Premier: Michael Harcourt
- Preceded by: Art Charbonneau
- Succeeded by: Corky Evans

Personal details
- Born: May 10, 1946 (age 79) Drumheller, Alberta
- Party: New Democrat

Jacquelynne (Jackie) Pement (born May 10, 1946 in Drumheller, Alberta) is a former Canadian politician, who represented the electoral district of Bulkley Valley-Stikine in the Legislative Assembly of British Columbia from 1991 to 1996. She was a member of the New Democratic Party.

She served as Minister of Transportation and Highways in the Executive Council of British Columbia from 1993 to 1996.
