= CICK-FM =

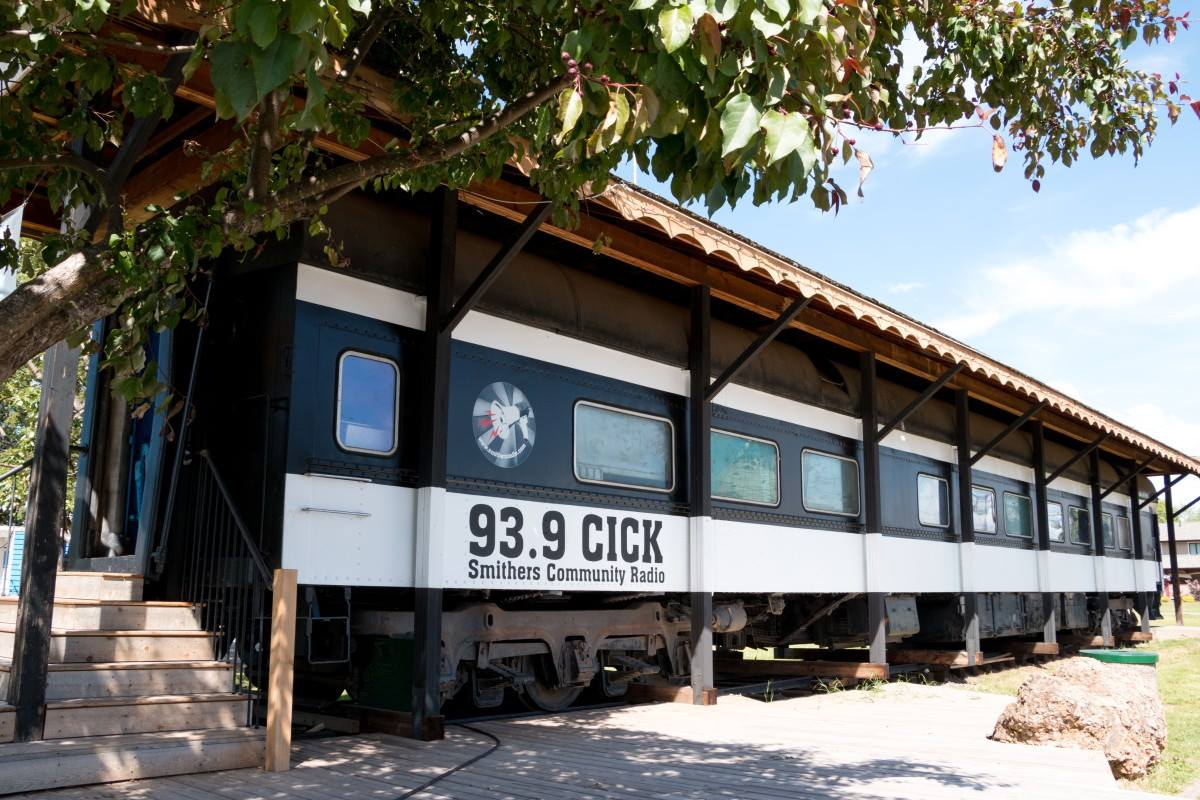
- The Quesnell is home to CICK-FM's studios
- Smithers, British Columbia; Canada
- Frequency: 93.9 MHz

Programming
- Format: Community radio

Ownership
- Owner: Smithers Community Radio Society

History
- Founded: 2009
- First air date: January 2010

Technical information
- Licensing authority: CRTC
- ERP: 50 watts
- HAAT: −28 metres (−92 ft)
- Transmitter coordinates: 54°46′47″N 127°10′11″W

Links
- Webcast: Listen live
- Website: smithersradio.com

CICK-FM is a Canadian radio station that broadcasts community radio programming at 93.9 FM over the Gitdumden Territory in Smithers, British Columbia.

Owned by Smithers Community Radio Society, the station received CRTC approval on June 18, 2009.

CICK launched in January 2010.

On August 29, 2012, Smithers Community Radio Society received CRTC approval to operate an English-language 50 watt FM community radio station at Smithers.

CICK is a volunteer operated community radio station that provides programming with a focus on local artists, non-mainstream Canadian music, and commentary reflecting the community's diverse perspectives. With over 30 local shows and twice as many volunteers, it has become a hub for new music and art promotion in the community.

The summer of 2015 saw the opening of the Lounge Car, Smithers Community Radio's live music broadcasting studio and concert venue.
