= Bill Goodacre =

Canadian politician (1951–2019)

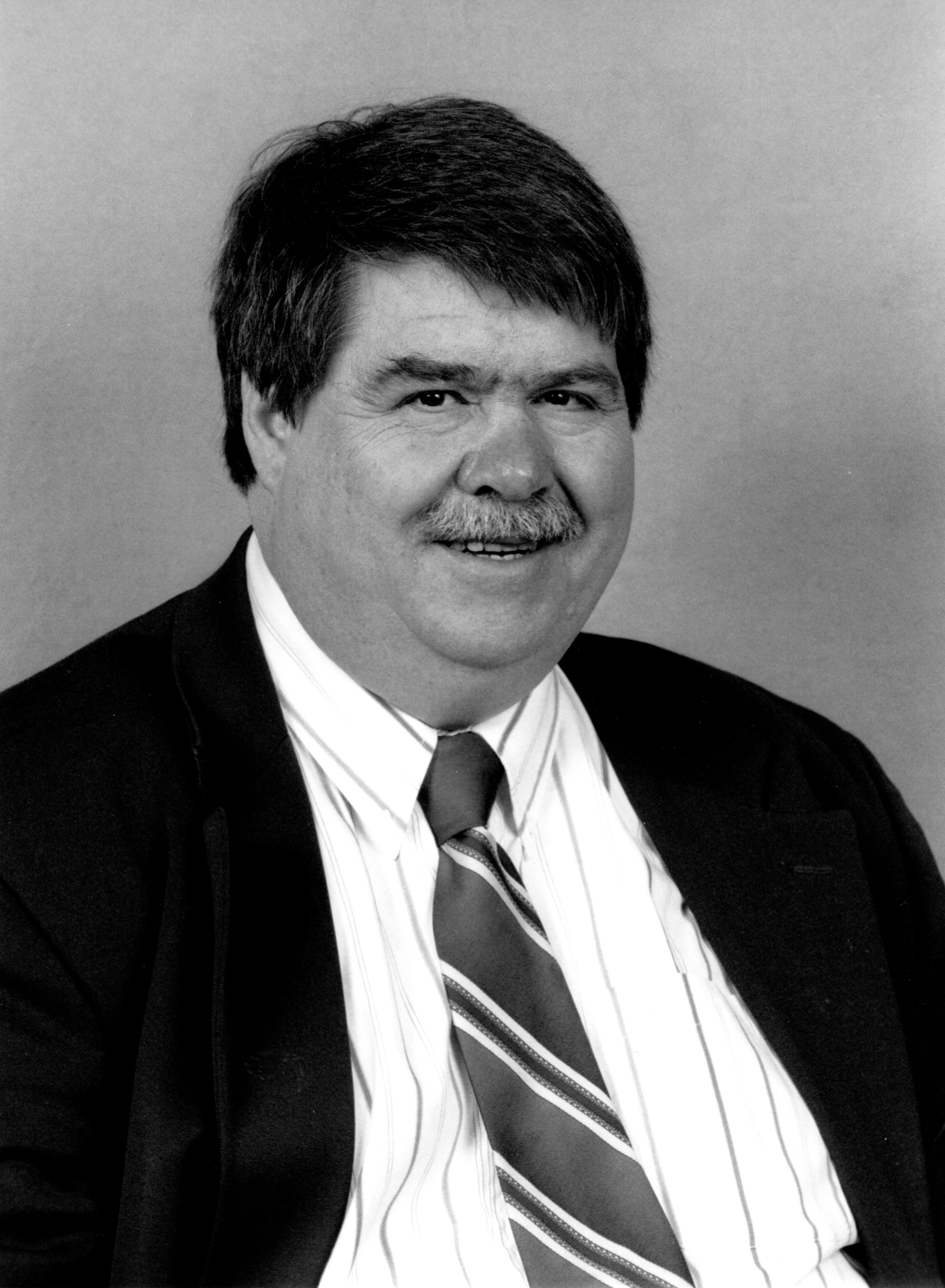

MLA for Bulkley Valley-Stikine
- In office 1996–2001
- Preceded by: Jackie Pement
- Succeeded by: Dennis MacKay

Personal details
- Born: August 15, 1951 Smithers, British Columbia
- Died: January 27, 2019 (aged 67) Smithers, British Columbia
- Party: New Democrat

William James Goodacre (August 15, 1951 – January 27, 2019) was a Canadian politician, who represented the electoral district of Bulkley Valley-Stikine in the Legislative Assembly of British Columbia from 1996 until his defeat by Liberal Party candidate Dennis MacKay in the 2001 general election. He was a member of the New Democratic Party.

He received a degree in economics from the University of British Columbia and worked as a grocer for Goodacre's Stores Ltd. Goodacre was married to Mary Etta Cloud and served on the town council for Smithers, British Columbia. He died on January 27, 2019.
