= Bertha Skye =

Cree Canadian chef, businesswoman and elder (1932–2024

Bertha Lena Skye (née Fraser; June 2, 1932 – July 18, 2024) was a Cree Canadian chef, businesswoman and elder. In 1992, she competed in the Culinary Olympics, where her Three Sisters soup won gold. She also served as an Elder-in-Residence at multiple post-secondary institutions in Ontario.

== Early life ==
Bertha Lena Fraser was born in 1932 on Ahtahkakoop Cree Nation in Saskatchewan to a Cree mother and Métis father.

Growing up during the Great Depression, Fraser, along with most others in her community, experienced food insecurity. Because of this food insecurity, her parents moved off-reserve so they could grow their own vegetables. This decision benefited Fraser as she was not forced into residential schooling like other children on the reserve.

== Career ==
In 1947, Fraser began working as a cook at the Prince Albert residential school, where she aimed to ensure every child received adequate nutrition despite the difficult conditions. Later, she took a similar job at a residential school in Norway House, Manitoba. However, she stayed only a year before returning to Prince Albert, then transferred to the Bishop Horden Memorial Residential School in Moose Factory, Ontario, where she met her husband, Herbert Skye.

After relocating to Six Nations of the Grand River, Skye started a catering and crafts business.

Skye also sat on the board for the Six Nations Health Foundation.

=== Culinary Olympics ===
In 1992, Skye was selected to participate in the Culinary Olympics as the only woman on Canada's first all-Indigenous team. The team won the competition with 11 medals, including a gold for Skye's Three Sisters soup.

=== Elder-in-Residence ===
Skye served as Elder in Residence at multiple post-secondary education institutions in Ontario, including Sheridan College, McMaster University, and Mohawk College. In this position, she guided administrators on implementing and improving Indigenous programs, as well as supporting Indigenous students.

Upon the opening of Sheridan College's Centre for Indigenous Learning and Support in 2015, Skye became a member of the university's Indigenous Education Council.

== Personal life and death ==
Skye met her husband, Hubert Skye, while working in Moose Jaw, Ontario. Hubert taught at the residential school and secretly taught children the Cayuga language. Two years later, the couple permanently resettled in Six Nations of the Grand River, where they eventually raised their five children and helped care for their grandchildren and great-grandchildren.

Skye died at her home on July 18, 2024, at the age of 92.

== Honors ==
Skye was inducted into Hamilton's Gallery of Distinction in 2019.
