= Smithers Airport =

Smithers Regional Airport
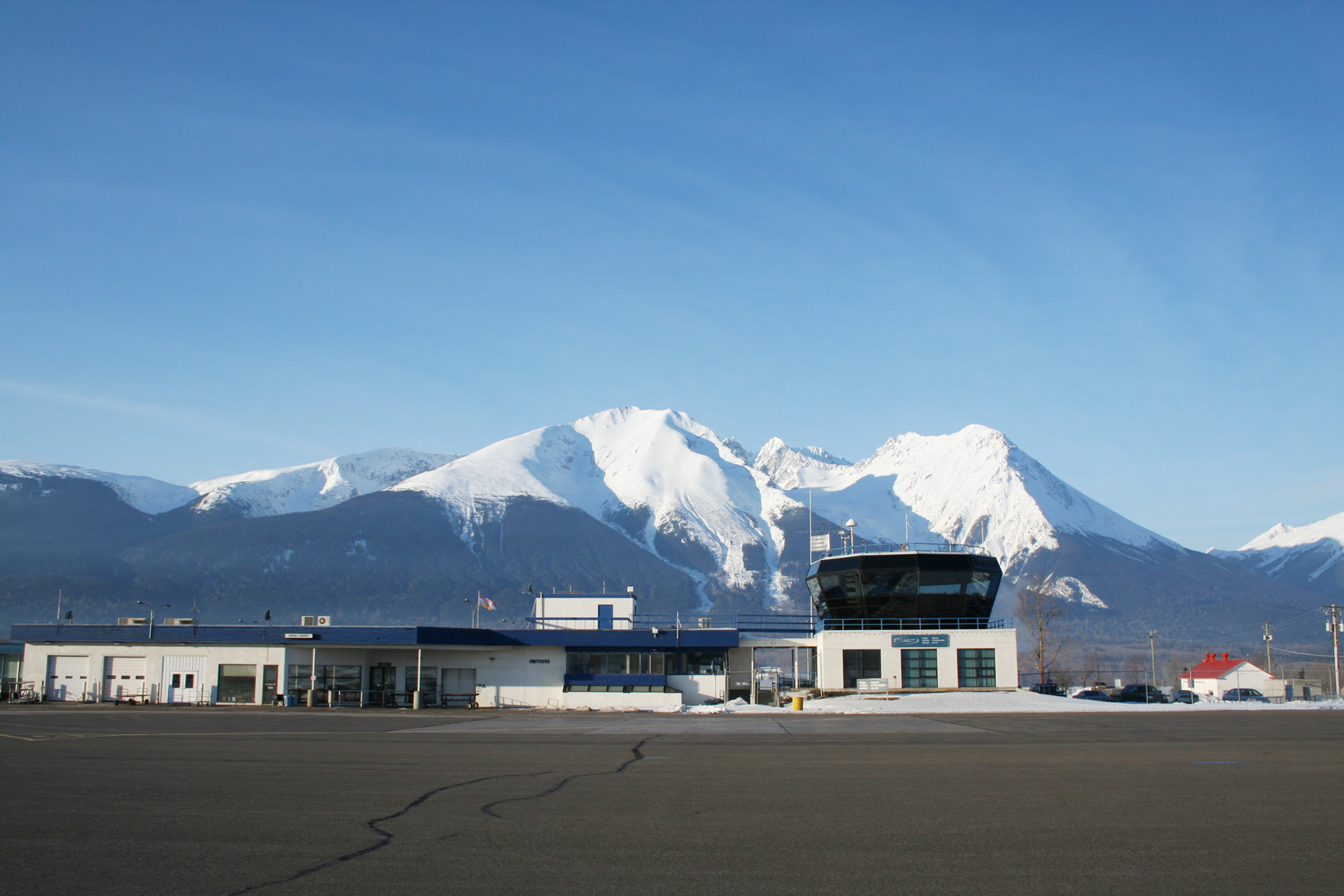
- Smithers Airport
- IATA: YYD; ICAO: CYYD; WMO: 71950

Summary
- Airport type: Public
- Operator: Town of Smithers
- Serves: Smithers, Bulkley Valley
- Location: Smithers, British Columbia
- Time zone: MST (UTC−07:00)
- Elevation AMSL: 1,717 ft (523 m)
- Coordinates: 54°49′31″N 127°10′58″W

Map
- Location in British Columbia

Runways
Direction	Length		Surface
Direction	ft	m	Surface
15/33	7,547	2,300	Asphalt

Statistics (2010)
- Aircraft movements: 9,494
- Sources: Canada Flight Supplement; Environment Canada; Movements from Statistics Canada

Smithers Airport (IATA: YYD, ICAO: CYYD) is 2 nautical miles (3.7 km; 2.3 mi) north of Smithers, British Columbia, Canada.

== History ==
A Yukon Airways and Exploration landing at Sproule's Ranch in 1928 was the first airplane arrival in the vicinity. This field was used for several years.

In 1929, the Board of Trade purchased the Ed Hill Ranch a few miles south of Smithers, calling it the Smithers Aviation Park, comprising a 1,200-foot (370 m) runway. With financial assistance from the Department of National Defence, the project was completed in 1933. Owing to size limitations, the Department of National Defence rebuilt at the present location in 1942.

Designated RCAF & D of T Aerodrome - Smithers, British Columbia at 54°49′N 127°09′W with a variation of 29 degrees E and elevation of 1,710 feet (521 m), the aerodrome was listed as having one runway as follows:

Runway name	Length	Width	Surface
14/32	4,400 feet (1,341 m)	200 feet (61 m)	Hard surfaced

After the war, the airport transferred to civilian use. In 1955, the runway was extended to 5,000 ft (1,524 m), and a new terminal opened in 1970. The Department of Transport transferred airport ownership to the town in 1999. Previously served by older generation Boeing 737 aircraft from the 1980s, an extension to 7,544 ft (2,299 m) in 2008 accommodates regional aircraft and other airplanes, as large as the Boeing 737.

Completed in 2018, phase one of a four-phase terminal expansion increased energy efficiency and provided a 150-passenger lounge. Formerly with a 54-seating capacity, later phases of the $8m project will increase building space.

As of 2025, runway data are as follows:

Runway name	Length	Width	Surface
15/33	7,547 ft (2,300 m)	150 ft (46 m)	Asphalt

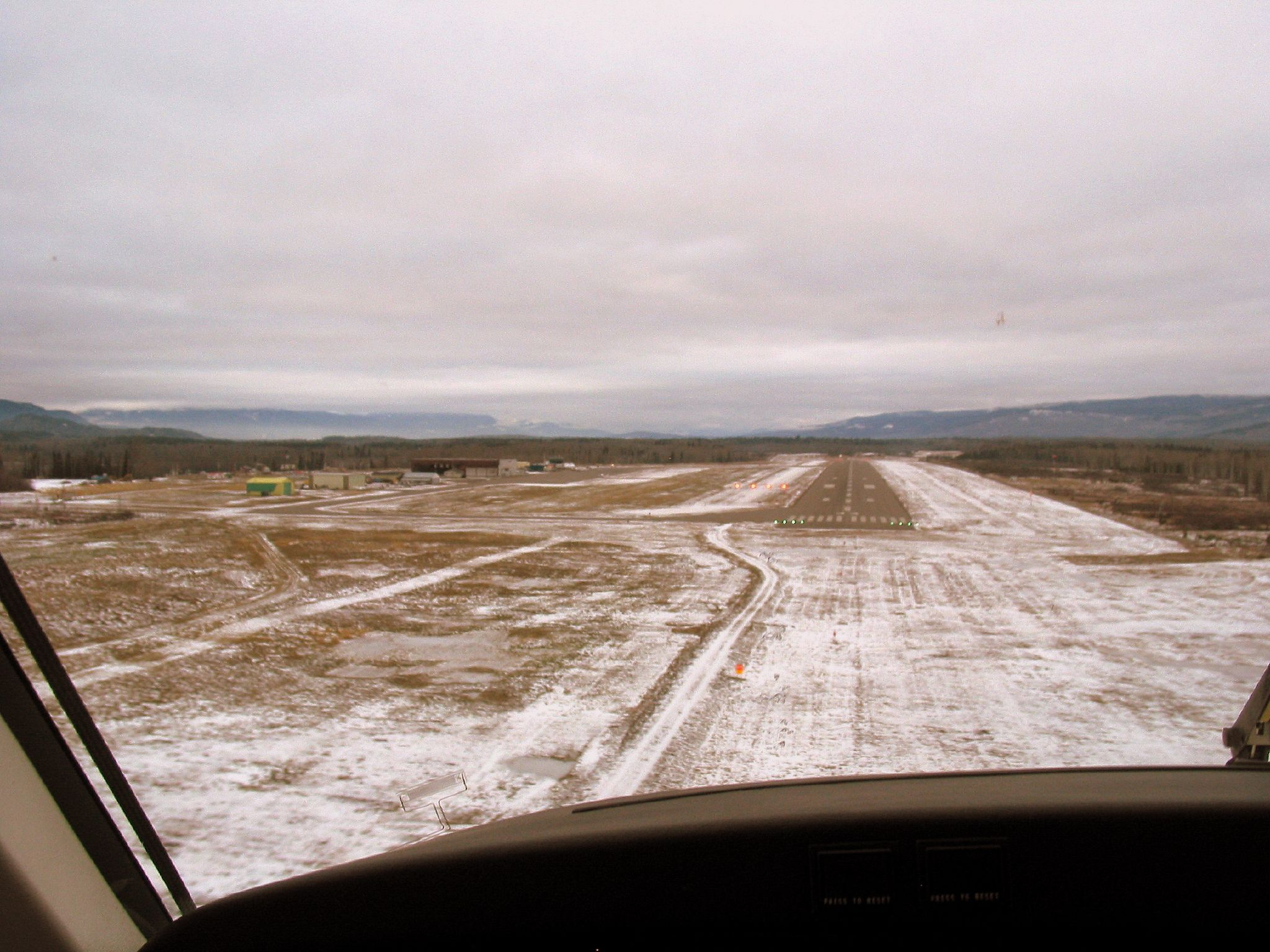
Landing runway 33 in 2007

== Nav Canada ==
Nav Canada operates a flight service station at Smithers Airport. Staffed hours of operations were cut on April 8, 2010 from 24 hours a day to 13 hours in the winter and 16 hours in the summer.

Staffed hours of operation:

- June 1 - September 30, 1300-0500 UTC
- October 1 - May 31, 1500-0400 UTC (1400-0300 UTC during daylight saving time)

== Airlines and destinations ==
Airlines	Destinations
Air Canada Express	Vancouver
Central Mountain Air	Vancouver

== See also ==
- Smithers/Tyhee Lake Water Aerodrome
