= Graham Roumieu =

Canadian illustrator

Graham Roumieu

Graham Roumieu is a Canadian illustrator based in Toronto, Ontario. He is perhaps best known for his Bigfoot-themed books (In Me Own Words: The Autobiography of Bigfoot, Me Write Book: It Bigfoot Memoir and Bigfoot: I Not Dead), but his work has also appeared in publications such as the New York Times, Harper's, and the Wall Street Journal.

== Bibliography ==
- Roumieu, Graham, In me own words: the autobiography of bigfoot, Manic D Press, 2003, ISBN 0-916397-84-X
- Roumieu, Graham (illustrator), & Taylor, Graham, A really super book about squirrels, Andrews McMeel Publishing, 2003, ISBN 978-0-7407-3177-8 / ISBN 0-7407-3177-7
- Roumieu, Graham, Me write book: it bigfoot memoir, Plume, 2005, ISBN 0-452-28685-9
- Roumieu, Graham, Bigfoot: I Not Dead, Plume, 2008, ISBN 978-0-452-28956-7
- Roumieu, Graham, Cat & Gnome, Blue Q, 2008, ISBN 978-1-60167-216-2
- Roumieu, Graham, 101 Ways To Kill Your Boss, Headline Publishing Group (UK), 2007, ISBN 978-0-7553-1688-5
- Roumieu, Graham (illustrator), & Coupland, Douglas, Highly inappropriate tales for young people, William Heinemann, 2011, ISBN 978-0-434-02159-8

== Reception of works ==
- Bigfoot books - "The trilogy is actually the work of Toronto-based illustrator Graham Roumieu, whose version of the fabled creature is alternately vulnerable and vicious."
- A really super book about squirrels - "Either author Graham Taylor and illustrator Graham Roumieu are crackpots with plenty of free time, or they are comedic geniuses with the ability to amuse both young and old." and "On the surface, this book is an inventive, wildly funny story heightened by Roumieu's drawings."
- Highly Inappropriate Tales for Young People - "this collection of cruel fables will undoubtedly charm" and "Roumieu's colour illustrations, which in magazines often get to tell a story all on their own, in this book compete with Coupland's verbal wit, which itself usually gets to draw its own absurd images in language.", "Graham Roumieu's illustrations are equally as inventive, loose and surprising, and the result is a charming and also unsettling reading experience."

== Awards ==
National Magazine Awards (Canada)

2006 Spot illustration silver award
2008 Honorable mention
