= Christian Heritage Party of British Columbia =

Provincial political party in Canada

- Abbreviation: CHP-BC
- Leader: Christian McCay
- President: Ed Ewald
- Founder: Wilf Hanni
- Founded: 2010; 16 years ago (as BCHP)
- Headquarters: 19812 Telkwa High Rd; Smithers, British Columbia; V0J 2N7
- Ideology: Christian right; Social conservatism
- Political position: Right-wing
- National affiliation: Christian Heritage Party of Canada
- Colours: Burgundy
- Slogan: Life! Family! And Freedom!
- Seats in the Legislative Assembly: 0 / 93

Website
- www.chpbc.ca

The Christian Heritage Party of British Columbia (CHP-BC), formerly the British Columbia Heritage Party, is a minor provincial political party in British Columbia, Canada and a provincial wing of the federal Christian Heritage Party of Canada. The party advocates in favour of establishing a constitution to govern the province of British Columbia.

== History ==
The party registered with Elections BC in September 2010 as the BC Heritage Party. A leadership election was held in 2011 between Wilf Hanni and Mischa Popoff, in which Hanni was re-confirmed as leader. Following internal party disputes, several members left to join the Individual Rights Party of British Columbia, including Mischa Popoff who became that party's leader.

In September 2011, members of the BC Heritage Party voted in favour of seeking to become a provincial wing of the Christian Heritage Party of Canada. The federal Christian Heritage Party agreed and in March 2012 the BC Heritage Party became the Christian Heritage Party of British Columbia.

Hanni stepped down in 2013 due to family health issues and Rod Taylor became the interim leader.

It nominated five candidates in the 2017 provincial election, none of whom was elected.

Laura-Lynn Tyler Thompson was elected as the party's leader on September 15, 2020. Thompson previously ran as a candidate for the People's Party of Canada in the 2019 Burnaby South federal by-election.

During the 2020 provincial election, the party nominated five candidates again, but this time with their new leader, Laura-Lynn Tyler Thompson. She ran in the Abbotsford South riding, and had the most votes out of all the CHP-BC candidates, with 1,439. She had a vote share of 9.20%. Rod Taylor, the National Leader of CHP Canada, ran in Stikine. As a result, he got 755 votes, and a 12.68% vote share, the highest out of all five CHP-BC candidates. None of them got elected.

In early 2022, Laura-Lynn Tyler Thompson stepped down as leader and Rod Taylor was once again the interim leader. During the annual general meeting on October 21, 2023, Taylor was unanimously affirmed as leader.

On October 18, 2025, the party elected Christian McCay as the new leader.

== Policies ==
The party was founded as the British Columbia Heritage Party with the stated objective "to restore and preserve our Great Canadian heritage, granted by our Creator, which is the foundation of our democratic system of government, in order to bring effective and accountable government to British Columbia". Party leader Wilf Hanni stated that the first priority in a government controlled by the BC Heritage Party would be to implement a six-point plan for democratic reforms, including preferential voting to replace the existing first-past-the-post voting, free votes, holding more referendums, making it easier to recall elected officials and implement citizens initiatives. Their second priority would be to review the tax structure and replace the taxation system so that the government is funded solely through a single rate income tax or a single rate consumption tax (decided in a referendum). The party plans to introduce "made-in-BC" constitution, with the framework drafted by the party but revised by a citizens' assembly.

The BC Heritage Party published a document of policy positions in September 2010. The positions outlined in this document include: lowering political donation amounts from corporations, unions, individuals to a maximum of $10,000 per year, halt government attempts to combat global warming, implement zero-based budgeting, encourage industrial development of in the Interior, place an export duty on raw logs, seek to build a bridge from the Lower Mainland to Vancouver Island, prohibit unauthorized access to private property for the purposes of mineral exploration, among other policy points.

== Leaders ==
#	Leader	Term start	Term end
1	Wilf Hanni	2010	2013
*	Rod Taylor (interim)	2013	2020
2	Laura-Lynn Tyler Thompson	2020	2022
*	Rod Taylor (interim)	2022	2023
3	Rod Taylor	2023	2025
4	Christian McCay	2025	incumbent

== Results ==
Election	Leader	Candidates run	Seats won	Votes	Vote share	Seat change	Position	Status
2013	Wilf Hanni	2 / 85	0 / 85	828	0.05%	0	11th	No seats
2017	Rod Taylor	5 / 87	0 / 87	▲3,398	▲0.17%	0	▲7th	No seats
2020	Laura-Lynn Tyler Thompson	5 / 87	0 / 87	▲3,895	▲0.21%	0	7th	No seats
2024	Rod Taylor	2 / 93	0 / 93	▼361	▼0.02	0	7th	No seats
2026	Christian McCay	3 / 93	0 / 93	▲459	▲	0		No seats
