= Smithers, British Columbia =

Smithers
- Town
- Town of Smithers
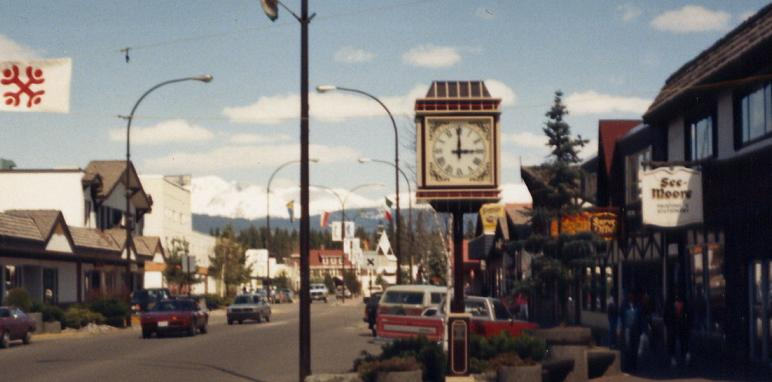
- Main Street Smithers (1989)

- Logo

- Location of Smithers Smithers (Canada)
- Coordinates: 54°46′45″N 127°10′34″W
- Country: Canada
- Province: British Columbia
- Regional District: Regional District of Bulkley-Nechako
- Founded: 1913
- Incorporated (village): 1921
- Incorporated (town): 1967

Government
  - Mayor: Gladys Atrill
  - Governing Body: Smithers Town Council
  - MP: Ellis Ross (Conservative)
  - MLA: Sharon Hartwell (Con)

Area
  - Town: 15.27 km^{2} (5.90 sq mi)
- Elevation: 490 m (1,610 ft)

Population (2021)
  - Town: 5,378
  - Density: 514.9/km^{2} (1,334/sq mi)
  - Urban: 5,351
  - Rural: 5,256
- Time zone: UTC−07:00 (PT)
- Postal code span: V0J 2N0 & V0J 3W0
- Area codes: 250, 778, 236, & 672
- Demonym: Smithereen
- Website: www.smithers.ca

Smithers is a town in northwestern British Columbia, approximately halfway between Prince George and Prince Rupert. With a population of 5,378 in 2021, Smithers provides service coverage for most of the Bulkley Valley.

== History ==
=== Railway ===
The planned Grand Trunk Pacific Railway (GTP) required two major divisional points in BC, where additional staff and facilities would be located. After Prince George, various central points on the Prince Rupert leg were considered in the vicinity of Aldermere. A prime choice was Hubert, 3.2 miles (5.1 km) east of Telkwa, initially called Bulkley by the developers, who had amassed the surrounding land. These speculators promoted a future new city, and later a trade centre of the Bulkley Valley, both fallacious claims, since Smithers had already been selected as the divisional point. The Interior News of Aldermere had earlier adopted a policy of refusing advertising from such unscrupulous promoters. The Aldermere Board of Trade was hostile to the idea of Telkwa itself being the divisional headquarters, allegedly because the rail yards would destroy the alder groves. In reality, they likely foresaw that even a station would soon relocate their community down to the stop.

The speculators had not considered the swampy ground 9.2 miles (14.8 km) west of Telkwa at the foot of Hudson Bay Mountain. Averse to sharing land sale profits with speculators, the GTP made this their headquarters, creating Smithers, named after Sir Alfred Smithers, chair of the GTP board. During 1913, the Railway Commission approved the station site as the second divisional point in March. Surveying started in April, 100 of the 160 acres of town site were cleared by August, and 160 acres of railyards by September. The railhead advanced by in July, and the first passenger train arrived in October.

With the standard quarter portion reserved for government facilities, the GTP began marketing plots that month. Despite ditches for draining, the subsoil was layers of quicksand and clay, requiring pile driving for building foundations. Pleas to the GTP to address the swampy road conditions fell on deaf ears.

The temporary train station, built in 1915, was replaced in 1919 by a Plan 100‐166 station building. For decades, the railway remained the dominant employer, but from the 1950s, employee numbers gradually dwindled, and buildings became redundant. In 1994, the Smithers Community Services Association purchased the listed station building.

=== Town layout ===
Professional landscape architects designed the street layout to accommodate a potential 10,000 people, and the municipality largely followed this plan over subsequent decades. In recent decades, expansion has adopted modern planning concepts, instead of the original grid pattern. However, the original design ignored the topography and soil conditions. Consequently, some lots on slopes, creeks or flood plains could not be developed. Main Street was the commercial core, with the train station and Alfred Park at one end and Central (formerly City Hall) Park at the other (now the intersection with Highway 16). Residential development radiated outward. In 1925, the government built a combined courthouse/provincial offices within the latter park. Main Street implemented an alpine theme in 1972.

=== Commerce & population ===
The Seymour Lake Lumber Company, having a 15,000-foot capacity per shift mill, was producing 10,000 feet of lumber daily to keep up with the building boom. Swampy land with canvas tents and shacks became what the Omenica Miner described in October 1913 as "the best district in British Columbia".

The Telkwa Tribune, renamed the Smithers Tribune, relocated and the Smithers Review opened. By 1914, there were the two newspapers, two banks, three churches, a three-storey hotel, stores, a telephone system and an electricity supply. Stores and services comprised six rooming houses, five restaurants, four general stores, doctor, dentist, drugstore, hardware store, sawmill, planing mill, two lumber yards, plumber, sheet iron worker, sign works, three contracting firms, two laundries, two poolrooms, livery stable, meat market, shoe shop, and two real estate firms.

After the 1914 Telkwa fire, which destroyed 13 downtown buildings, many businesses relocated to Smithers, a community of 125 permanent buildings and 700 people. The sizable GTP payroll provided a solid base to attract further settlers and businesses. Initial optimism projected a 5,000 population by 1915, which was finally achieved in 1991. The population, that fell during World War I, was 350 in 1918, and 520 in 1920.

Volunteers contained two 1921 fires. The power plant one caused $10,000 damage to a cold storage plant. Months later, two adjacent hotels burned to the ground. By 1925, the population was about 1,000. A 1930 fire caused $25,000 damage to the Hudson Bay Lumber sawmill on the western outskirts A.S. Sargent permanently closed his store after a 1931 fire. During the Great Depression, many businesses closed, and the population hovered around 700.

From the 1940s, many small independent bush mills supplied the two local planer mills. The population increased from 1,204 in 1951 to 2,487 in 1961, 4,570 by 1981, and peaked at 5,624 in 1996.

=== Public institutions & amenities ===
The post office completed, J. Mason Adams was the inaugural postmaster 1913–14. He operated the first drug store in Telkwa. The Smithers Citizens Association, formed in December 1913, provided leadership, but could not levy taxes. Miss Mary K. Downey was the initial teacher at the school established in April 1914. In 1915, a permanent building replaced temporary accommodation in the Methodist Church. Citizen donations provided a $15,000 community hall. In 1920, the premier opened the two-storey hospital, which provided 15 beds on remodelling. Smithers became the first incorporated village for BC in 1921.

During the Depression, the basic rural road network was built, the golf course opened in 1931, the airfield in 1933, a fire truck was purchased, the Bulkley Valley District Hospital (staffed by the Sisters of St. Anne until 1969) opened in 1934, and the Dominion Experimental Farm in 1938. Highway 16 was completed to Prince Rupert in 1944. A 1947 referendum approved a town water supply. In 1967, when Smithers became a town, J.F. MacDonald was the first mayor. The combined library/museum built that year housed the books previously shelved in the Municipal Hall garage since 1955. A decade later, the museum moved to the Central Park building, allowing the library to expand. In 1976, the province moved the regional office from Prince Rupert. The Bulkley Valley Regional Pool and Recreation Centre opened in 1990.

== Education, health & emergency services ==
School District 54 Bulkley Valley is one of the largest employers, and three private schools operate. A Coast Mountain College campus provides tertiary education. The Smithers Public Library is open 5–9 hours daily on 6 days per week. The Bulkley Valley Museum has similar restricted opening times.

The Bulkley Valley Regional Pool and Recreation Centre is open daily. The Bulkley Valley District Hospital is a 25-bed acute care facility.

A 40-person volunteer fire department, and three-ambulance base exist.

The Royal Canadian Mounted Police detachment serves Smithers, Telkwa, Fort Babine Reserve, and the Moricetown First Nations Reserve.

Smithers and area now has a BC Emergency Support Services team.

== Transportation ==
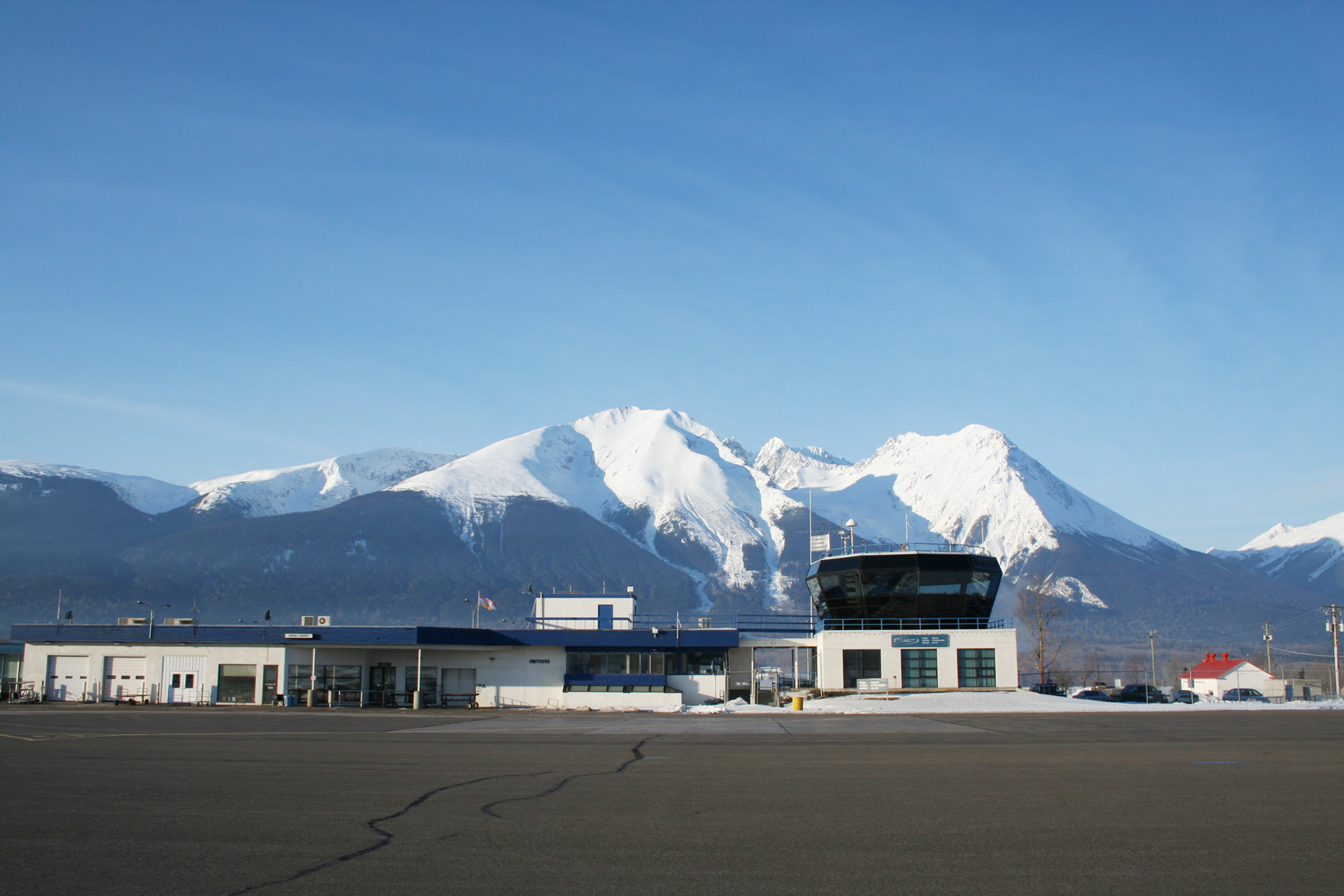
Smithers Airport

The community is served by Smithers Airport. Air Canada, Central Mountain Air, charter airlines, and helicopter companies, provide multiple daily flights.

VIA Rail's Jasper-Prince Rupert makes a scheduled stop three times a week in each direction.

When Greyhound cancelled this route in 2019, BC Bus North, became the replacement operator for a twice weekly service.

== Culture ==
Smithers and the Bulkley Valley have often been described by non-residents as the somewhat culturally unique to the rest of Northern British Columbia. Many factors contribute to the composition of society in Smithers, including the arts, industry smoke stacks outside of town from mills and mining.

Smithers has adopted an alpine theme, which is drawn from the geography of the area. A town bylaw requires businesses in the downtown area centred on Main Street to construct their buildings in an alpine style. A fibreglass statue of a man blowing an alpine horn, commonly referred to as The Alpenman or Alpine Al, is located at the entrance to the main street and has become the town symbol. Similarly, the Smithers chamber of commerce displays an Alpine Al costume at community events and in television advertisements for the town's businesses.

Residents of Smithers are called Smithereens which remains a more popularly accepted demonym than the sometimes used 'Smitherite'.

Smithereens have a particularly strong environmental ethic. In 2006, over 600 Smithereens took to the streets to voice their opposition to a proposed coalbed methane gas field near Telkwa, which they claimed would threaten local water quality, landscape integrity and wild salmon populations.

Likewise a proposal by Thompson Creek Metals to develop a molybdenum mine to extract the Davidson deposit on Hudson Bay Mountain near the town was vigorously opposed over a period of years before TCM abandoned the project.

Smithers and the Bulkley Valley are home to many musicians, including Juno-Award-winning Alexis Puentes. The biggest assembly of musical talent happens during the annual Mid-Summer Music Festival in late June. Over the years, the Mid-Summer Music Festival has seen some famous acts like Spirit of the West and the Barenaked Ladies and has drawn audiences and participants from all across North America.

The Della Herman Theatre, named after a longtime resident and former school board official, is the primary venue for shows and performances, though several pubs and even open fields serve as secondary performance venues. Numerous organizations including the Bulkley Valley Community Arts Council operate to keep music and other artistic activities vibrant.

== Demographics ==
In the 2021 Census of Population conducted by Statistics Canada, Smithers had a population of 5,378 living in 2,313 of its 2,411 total private dwellings, a change of −0.4% from its 2016 population of 5,401. With a land area of 15.26 km^{2} (5.89 sq mi), it had a population density of 352.4/km^{2} (912.8/sq mi) in 2021.

Canada 2016 Census
	Smithers	British Columbia
Median age	39.3 years	43 years
Under 15 years old	18%	14.9%
Between 15 and 60 years old	66.1%	66.9%
65 years old and over	15.8%	18.3%
85 years old and over	2.6%	2.3%

The latest census, taken in 2016, recorded 5,351 residents in 1,435 families of an average size of 2.9 persons.

=== Ethnicity ===
Panethnic groups in the Town of Smithers (2001−2021)
Panethnic group	2021		2016		2011		2006		2001	
Panethnic group	Pop.	%	Pop.	%	Pop.	%	Pop.	%	Pop.	%
European (Note: Statistic includes all persons that did not make up part of a visible minority or an indigenous identity.)	4,185	79.56%	4,395	83.08%	4,565	85.65%	4,115	79.98%	4,620	86.44%
Indigenous	550	10.46%	555	10.49%	585	10.98%	765	14.87%	535	10.01%
South Asian	195	3.71%	25	0.47%	25	0.47%	10	0.19%	0	0%
Southeast Asian (Note: Statistic includes total responses of "Filipino" and "Southeast Asian" under visible minority section on census.)	140	2.66%	100	1.89%	105	1.97%	100	1.94%	10	0.19%
East Asian (Note: Statistic includes total responses of "Chinese", "Korean", and "Japanese" under visible minority section on census.)	60	1.14%	110	2.08%	20	0.38%	105	2.04%	95	1.78%
African	60	1.14%	65	1.23%	45	0.84%	25	0.49%	60	1.12%
Latin American	25	0.48%	20	0.38%	0	0%	0	0%	10	0.19%
Middle Eastern (Note: Statistic includes total responses of "West Asian" and "Arab" under visible minority section on census.)	15	0.29%	20	0.38%	0	0%	0	0%	0	0%
Other/multiracial (Note: Statistic includes total responses of "Visible minority, n.i.e." and "Multiple visible minorities" under visible minority section on census.)	0	0%	20	0.38%	0	0%	15	0.29%	10	0.19%
Total responses	5,260	97.81%	5,290	97.94%	5,330	98.63%	5,145	98.62%	5,345	98.73%
Total population	5,378	100%	5,401	100%	5,404	100%	5,217	100%	5,414	100%
Note: Totals greater than 100% due to multiple origin responses.

=== Religion ===
According to the 2021 census, religious groups in Smithers included:

- Irreligion (2,780 persons or 52.9%)
- Christianity (2,290 persons or 43.5%)
- Sikhism (95 persons or 1.8%)
- Judaism (35 persons or 0.7%)
- Buddhism (10 persons or 0.2%)
- Hinduism (10 persons or 0.2%)
- Other (40 persons or 0.8%)

== Notable residents ==
=== Hockey players ===
Despite its small population, Smithers has produced several notable professional ice hockey players:

- Brothers Joe Watson and Jimmy Watson: won the Stanley Cup as defencemen with the Philadelphia Flyers in the 1973–74 and 1974-75 seasons. Jimmy Watson was a five-time NHL All-Star game selection and played for Team Canada at the Canada Cup in 1976. Joe Watson was a two-time NHL All-Star. Both are members of the Flyers Hall of Fame. In their active years, the Watson brothers held an annual hockey school that included the "mid-summer" hockey game.
- Brothers Ron Flockhart (NHL career 1980-1991) and Rob Flockhart, played for the Smithers Nats in the Pacific Northwest Hockey League (P.N.W.H.L), that played for the Fowler Cup in the 1970s.
- Alan Kerr: played for the New York Islanders, Detroit Red Wings and Winnipeg Jets in the 1980s and 1990s
- Dan Hamhuis: retired NHL defenceman who played for the Nashville Predators, Vancouver Canucks, and Dallas Stars. He won an Olympic gold medal with the 2014 Canadian Olympic team.
- Michael Wall: goalie for the Colorado Avalanche (Traded 2007)
- Ron Homenuke: forward for the Vancouver Canucks. Career ended abruptly after a hiking accident. He later became a missionary.
- Adam Kingsmill: ice sledge hockey player.

=== Others ===
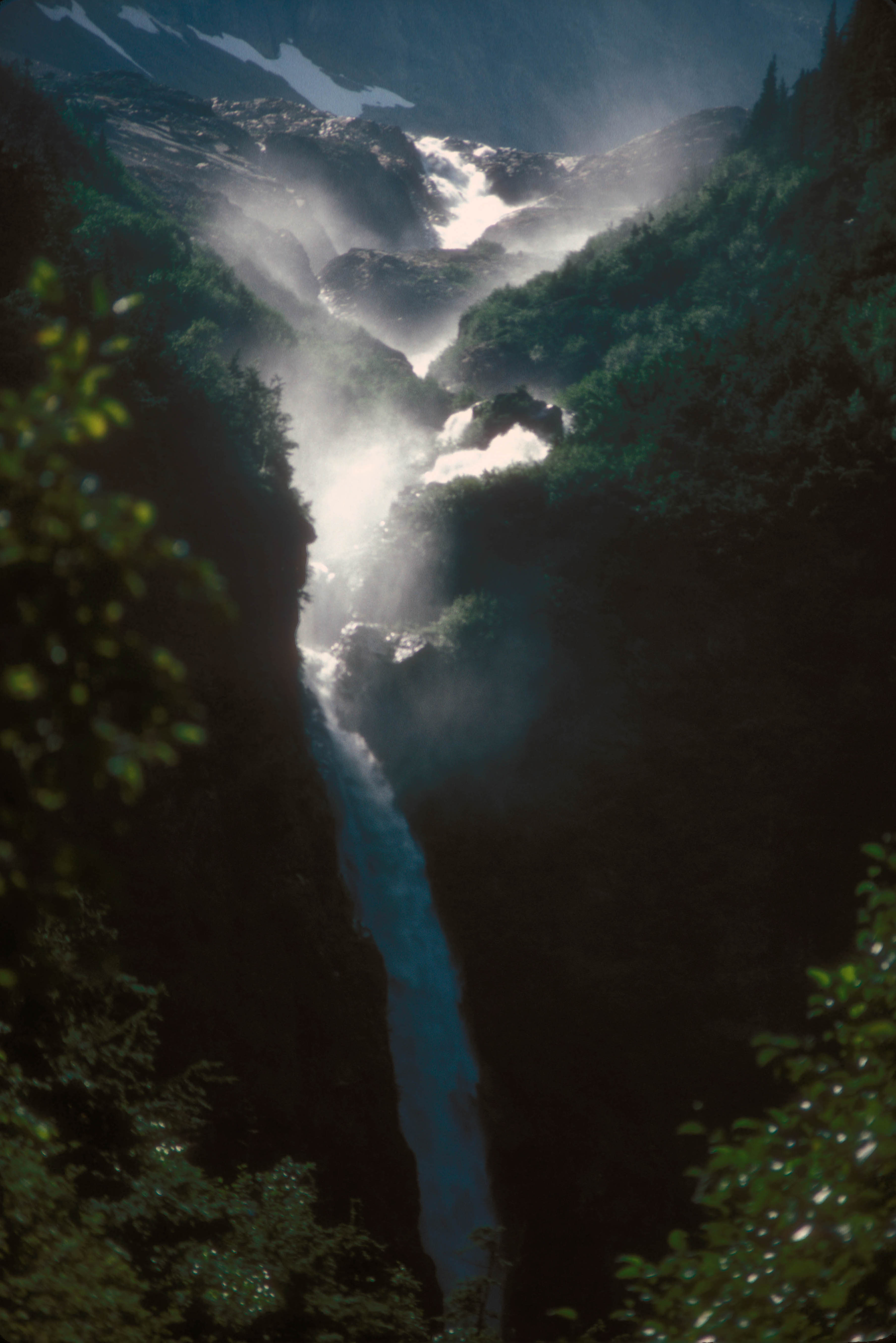
Twin Falls near Smithers

- Dean Brody, country musician
- Peter Capak, Astrophysicist
- Robert Chaplin, artist and publisher
- Lisa Conway, musician and sound artist
- Joseph Coyle, Newspaper editor and inventor of the egg carton
- Alex Cuba, musician
- Nathan Cullen, federal politician
- Tobin Frank, musician with the Canadian band Spirit of the West
- Andrew George, Jr., chef and publisher
- Ruth Hamblin, professional basketball player in Australia (formerly WNBA)
- Gina Holden, actress
- Daniel Imhof, professional soccer player at VfL Bochum (Germany)
- Susan Juby, novelist, author
- Alicia Kaye, Canadian triathlete
- Dan Mangan, musician
- Robin Mathews, poet, political activist, playwright, teacher, essayist
- Graham Roumieu, author and illustrator
- Antje von Seydlitz-Kurzbach, Canadian Olympic rower
- Taylor Bachrach, federal politician and former mayor

== Recreation ==
Smithers is known for its world class skiing and fishing (in particular for steelhead). Other popular activities include soccer, volleyball, hockey, baseball, downhill mountain biking, cross-country skiing, hiking, quadding and snowmobiling. Smithers offers a variety of extreme sports, for example quadding in the back country, snowmobiling in the surrounding mountains, paragliding, or mountain biking down Hudson Bay Mountain. Smithers is known for its variety of recreation.

== Geography ==
West of Smithers are Witset, New Hazelton, Kitwanga, Thornhill, Terrace, Kitimat, Port Edward and Prince Rupert, while to the east are Telkwa, Houston, Topley, Burns Lake, Fraser Lake, Fort Fraser, Vanderhoof and Prince George.

== Climate ==
Smithers has a humid continental climate, (Dfb,) although it used to be a subarctic climate. Winters are cold and cloudy but highly variable with a January average of −7.2 °C (19.0 °F). Snow is the main type of precipitation during winter. Warm spells can push temperatures above freezing during the winter months, while cold weather systems can reduce the temperature to less than −20 °C (−4 °F). The average annual snowfall is 183.4 cm (72.2 in), with maximum accumulations of snow tending to happen in February when the average snow depth is 31 cm (12 in). Summers are warm, with average highs of about 22 °C (72 °F) and an extreme high of 36.0 °C (96.8 °F). Nighttime temperatures are often cool, with normal nighttime lows just under 10 °C (50 °F). Depending on the year, there may be very little or a lot of precipitation. Spring and fall are short transition seasons. Smithers receives an average of 505.6 mm (19.91 in) of precipitation a year, with February through April being the driest months. Smithers receives 1,621 hours of bright sunshine a year, ranging from a minimum of 12% of possible sunshine in December to a maximum of 47% of possible sunshine in August.

Climate data for Smithers (Smithers Airport). Climate ID: 1077500; coordinates 54°49′29″N 127°10′58″W; elevation: 521.8 m (1,712 ft); 1991–2020 normals
Month	Jan	Feb	Mar	Apr	May	Jun	Jul	Aug	Sep	Oct	Nov	Dec	Year
Record high humidex	15.0	11.0	18.5	25.5	35.2	35.2	38.1	37.3	32.9	23.7	14.0	12.9	38.1
Record high °C (°F)	15.6 (60.1)	11.9 (53.4)	18.9 (66.0)	25.8 (78.4)	35.8 (96.4)	34.2 (93.6)	36.0 (96.8)	35.2 (95.4)	31.1 (88.0)	24.4 (75.9)	15.6 (60.1)	13.6 (56.5)	36 (97)
Mean daily maximum °C (°F)	−3.4 (25.9)	0.0 (32.0)	4.9 (40.8)	11.0 (51.8)	16.6 (61.9)	19.5 (67.1)	21.8 (71.2)	21.5 (70.7)	16.2 (61.2)	8.7 (47.7)	1.2 (34.2)	−3.1 (26.4)	9.6 (49.2)
Daily mean °C (°F)	−7.2 (19.0)	−4.6 (23.7)	−0.3 (31.5)	4.9 (40.8)	10.0 (50.0)	13.2 (55.8)	15.4 (59.7)	14.8 (58.6)	10.4 (50.7)	4.4 (39.9)	−1.8 (28.8)	−6.5 (20.3)	4.4 (39.9)
Mean daily minimum °C (°F)	−10.9 (12.4)	−9.2 (15.4)	−5.5 (22.1)	−1.2 (29.8)	3.3 (37.9)	6.9 (44.4)	9.0 (48.2)	8.1 (46.6)	4.4 (39.9)	0.1 (32.2)	−4.7 (23.5)	−9.9 (14.2)	−0.8 (30.6)
Record low °C (°F)	−43.9 (−47.0)	−35.6 (−32.1)	−33.3 (−27.9)	−18.3 (−0.9)	−7.2 (19.0)	−4.1 (24.6)	−1.1 (30.0)	−2.2 (28.0)	−6.7 (19.9)	−22.0 (−7.6)	−32.4 (−26.3)	−39.0 (−38.2)	−43.9 (−47.0)
Record low wind chill	−47	−44	−40	−22	−7	−3	0	−2	−8	−30	−45	−50	−50
Average precipitation mm (inches)	42.2 (1.66)	23.8 (0.94)	19.7 (0.78)	26.6 (1.05)	38.9 (1.53)	50.9 (2.00)	43.8 (1.72)	45.4 (1.79)	49.4 (1.94)	66.3 (2.61)	54.3 (2.14)	44.3 (1.74)	505.6 (19.9)
Average rainfall mm (inches)	10.9 (0.43)	4.6 (0.18)	6.5 (0.26)	23.3 (0.92)	38.1 (1.50)	51.6 (2.03)	43.1 (1.70)	44.1 (1.74)	50.3 (1.98)	57.6 (2.27)	23.2 (0.91)	7.5 (0.30)	360.8 (14.22)
Average snowfall cm (inches)	40.8 (16.1)	24.7 (9.7)	16.7 (6.6)	4.8 (1.9)	0.8 (0.3)	0.0 (0.0)	0.0 (0.0)	0.0 (0.0)	0.0 (0.0)	9.2 (3.6)	38.1 (15.0)	48.3 (19.0)	183.4 (72.2)
Average precipitation days (≥ 0.2 mm)	15.5	10.6	10.6	10.7	11.9	13.6	13.0	12.4	14.3	17.2	15.7	15.6	161.1
Average rainy days (≥ 0.2 mm)	3.4	2.6	4.4	9.2	11.7	13.5	12.7	12.0	14.3	15.6	6.9	2.9	109.2
Average snowy days (≥ 0.2 cm)	13.5	8.9	7.1	2.2	0.4	0	0	0	0	2.5	11.1	14.4	60.1
Average relative humidity (%)	79.8	66.3	51.7	44.0	42.1	47.9	50.9	49.6	56.9	67.6	80.0	83.7	60.0
Mean monthly sunshine hours	42.5	75.8	128	177	217.8	216.6	239.6	217.2	152.7	87.5	39.7	26.4	1,620.7
Percentage possible sunshine	17.4	27.8	34.9	41.9	43.7	41.9	46.2	46.9	39.8	26.8	15.6	11.6	32.9

== Movies and television ==
- Disney's Eight Below, starring Paul Walker and Jason Biggs, was partially filmed there.
- The film The Grey, starring Liam Neeson and Dermot Mulroney, was partially filmed there. It was mostly shot in Vancouver.
- The film The Mother, starring Jennifer Lopez, was partially filmed there.
- The Comedy Network show, Alice, I Think, is set in Smithers; however, it is not filmed there, aside from location shots.
- Smithers was referenced in the show How I Met Your Mother (Season 7, Episode 6 - Mystery Vs. History).

== Media ==
=== Television ===
Smithers is served by four television stations, three of which rebroadcast using transmitters owned by the Houston-Smithers Rebroadcasting Society:

Call sign	Channel	Network	Notes
CFTK-TV-2	5 (VHF)	CTV 2	Rebroadcaster of CFTK-TV (Terrace)
CFHO-TV-2	10 (VHF)	Global	Community-owned rebroadcaster of CHAN-DT (Vancouver)
CFHO-TV-1	13 (VHF)	CTV	Community-owned rebroadcaster of CIVT-DT (Vancouver)
CH4441	20 (UHF)	Knowledge Network	Community-owned rebroadcaster of cable-only channel

=== Radio ===
Smithers is served by six radio stations:

Call sign	Frequency	Name	Format	Notes
CFBV	870 AM	The Moose	Variety hits	
CKEW-FM	88.1 FM	CBC Radio 2	Adult contemporary, public radio	Community-owned rebroadcaster of CBU-FM (Vancouver)
CJFW-FM-6	92.9 FM	CJFW	Country music	Rebroadcaster of CJFW-FM (Terrace)
CICK-FM	93.9 FM	Smithers Community Radio	Community radio	
VF2169	95.1 FM	CFNR	Classic rock, First Nations community radio	Rebroadcaster of CFNR-FM (Terrace)
CBRS-FM	97.5 FM	CBC Radio One	Public radio	Rebroadcaster of CBYG-FM (Prince George)
