= Telkwa =

- Village
- The Corporation of the Village of Telkwa
- Motto: Where rivers meet and friends gather.
- Location of Telkwa in British Columbia Telkwa (Canada)
- Coordinates: 54°41′50″N 127°03′00″W
- Country: Canada
- Province: British Columbia
- Region: Bulkley Valley
- Regional district: Regional District of Bulkley-Nechako
- Incorporated: 1952

Government
  - Governing body: Telkwa Village Council

Area
  - Total: 7.04 km^{2} (2.72 sq mi)
- Elevation: 520 m (1,710 ft)

Population (2022)
  - Total: 1,460
  - Density: 191.9/km^{2} (497/sq mi)
- Time zone: UTC−07:00 (PT)
- Highway: British Columbia Highway 16
- Waterways: Bulkley River, Tyhee Lake
- Website: www.telkwa.ca

Telkwa is a village located along British Columbia Highway 16, nearly 15 kilometres (9 mi) southeast of the town of Smithers and 350 kilometres (220 mi) west of the city of Prince George, in northwest British Columbia, Canada.

== History ==
Settlement in the area began around 1904 in a townsite known as Aldermere on the hill above Telkwa. Around 1907, people began to move down the hill to be closer to water supplies and the anticipated route of the Grand Trunk Pacific Railway. The name Telkwa is possibly an Indigenous term for "meeting of the waters" which appropriately describes the confluence of the Bulkley and Telkwa Rivers in town.

== Demographics ==
In the 2021 Census of Population conducted by Statistics Canada, Telkwa had a population of 1,474 living in 562 of its 584 total private dwellings, a change of 11.1% from its 2016 population of 1,327. With a land area of 7.04 km^{2} (2.72 sq mi), it had a population density of 209.4/km^{2} (542.3/sq mi) in 2021.

=== Religion ===
According to the 2021 census, religious groups in Telkwa included:

- Irreligion (910 persons or 61.9%)
- Christianity (510 persons or 34.7%)
- Judaism (15 persons or 1.0%)
- Other (35 persons or 2.4%)

== Attractions ==
The history of the town can be explored at the Telkwa Museum and on a tour of the historic former town site of Aldermere. Telkwa hosts an annual barbecue and demolition derby on Labour Day weekend. The town also has Eddy Park, at the riverside, with a small gazebo right off the highway to sit and have a picnic and watch the Bulkley River go by.

There are four trails: the 8 km Hunter Basin Road, the 12.5 km Winfield Creek Road Trail, the 10.5 km McDowell Lake Trail, and the 51 km Telkwa Pass Trail.

== Infrastructure ==
=== Transportation ===
Via Rail's Jasper – Prince Rupert train calls at the Telkwa railway station several times per week.
