= James Charles Brady =

Canadian politician (1876–1962)

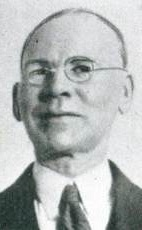

Member of the Canadian Parliament for Skeena
- In office 1926–1930
- Preceded by: Alfred Stork
- Succeeded by: Olof Hanson

Personal details
- Born: January 21, 1876 Dublin, Ireland
- Died: January 24, 1962 (aged 86)
- Party: Conservative Party
- Occupation: School principal, teacher

James Charles Brady (January 21, 1876 – January 24, 1962) was a Canadian politician, school principal and teacher. He was elected to the House of Commons of Canada as a Member of the Conservative Party to represent the riding of Skeena. He was defeated in the 1930 election.
