= Dick Harris =

Canadian politician

Member of Parliament for Prince George–Bulkley Valley
- In office 1993–2004
- Preceded by: Brian Gardiner
- Succeeded by: riding dissolved

Member of Parliament for Cariboo—Prince George
- In office 2004 – August 4, 2015
- Preceded by: first member
- Succeeded by: Todd Doherty

Personal details
- Born: Richard M. Harris; September 6, 1944 (age 81) Vancouver, British Columbia, Canada
- Party: Conservative
- Other political affiliations: Reform (1993-2000); Canadian Alliance (2000-2003)
- Spouse: Anne Phillips
- Children: Mike, Ryan, Lisa
- Profession: Businessman (Tire sales)

Richard M. Harris (born September 6, 1944) is a Canadian politician. He was a Member of Parliament from 1993 to 2015 and sat as a member of the Conservative Party of Canada. He was previously member of the Reform Party of Canada and the Canadian Alliance. From 2004 to 2015, he represented the electoral district of Cariboo—Prince George, and formerly represented Prince George–Bulkley Valley. He was first elected during the 1993 federal election and was re-elected in 1997, 2000, 2004, 2006, 2008 and 2011. He challenged Reform Party leader Preston Manning for leadership when Manning proposed merging the party with the Progressive Conservative Party of Canada. He later campaigned for Stockwell Day to become leader. The most prominent position he held with his party was Chief Opposition Whip from 2001 to 2002. He generated controversy when he appointed an unelected, Conservative Party member to represent a neighbouring electoral district in governmental affairs, though the electoral district had an elected Member of Parliament, but from an opposition party. In Fiscal Year 2009-10 he was the top spending Member of Parliament, and had the largest hospitality and lowest advertising expenditures of any house member.

He has served a member on several parliamentary committees, including the 'Standing Committee on Finance' during the 36th and 37th Parliaments and the 'Standing Committee on Natural Resources' during the 39th, and 40th Parliaments. In the 41st Parliament he sat on the Veteran's Affairs Committee. He has introduced three Private Member Bills into the House of Commons. The first two bills were introduced when he was a member of the opposition. The first bill, having to do with penalties for drunk driving was defeated, however, the government felt that the content of the bill was worthy of introducing a similar bill which was passed. The second bill : An Act to amend the Criminal Code (failure to stop at scene of accident) was introduced in the 38th Parliament but was not adopted. His third private members bill was introduced during the 41st Parliament; An Act to amend the Employment Insurance Act (incarceration) was introduced in October 2011.

== Before becoming a Member of Parliament ==
Dick Harris was born in Vancouver but, along with a brother, he was raised in Prince Rupert, British Columbia by his mother, a single parent. After finishing school he moved to Prince George, married and raised three children. A businessman, he owned and operated several companies in Prince George and the Cariboo region. His most successful company specialized in tires and distribution of tire parts, though he sold the companies before being elected as a Member of Parliament.

Politically, Harris had been a supporter of the Progressive Conservative Party for 20 years before joining the Reform Party in 1989. He was active in fundraising and became chairman of the Reform Fund Canada. He served on the party's executive council from 1991 to 1993. In 1992, Harris won the Reform Party nomination to stand for election in the next federal election in the Prince George–Bulkley Valley riding.

== 35th Parliament ==
The next federal election was held in October 1993. The race in the Prince George–Bulkley Valley riding was expected to be close between Harris and the incumbent MP, Brian Gardiner (NDP). However, his party placed third and the Liberal Party of Canada formed a majority government. In both sessions of the 35th Parliament Harris sat on the 'Standing Committee on Government Operations' and the 'Standing Committee on Transport'. In the first session he was also assigned to two subcommittees: the 'Subcommittee on the St. Lawrence Seaway' and the 'Subcommittee on the Consideration of the Objections Filed on the Proposed Electoral Boundaries for the Western Provinces'. In July 1994, Reform Party leader Preston Manning formed a three-member critic team for Indian Affairs and Northern Development with Harris, Mike Scott and John Duncan. The team held town hall-style meetings in BC where they opposed independent self-governments but advocated for municipal-style governments on reserves, like the Sechelt Indian Government District, and warned that land claims could be costly and usurp private property rights. The three member team was unable to draw sufficient attention to the Reform Party's position on native affairs, so the team was disbanded in December 1994 and Harris reassigned to the "Reform Posse", a special team of Reform Party MPs (Harris, Jay Hill and Randy White) meant to investigate government spending, similar to the Liberal Party of Canada Rat Pack. With the assistance of a forensic accountant, the Reform Posse investigated the Department of Indian Affairs but Manning disbanded them in August 1995 and Harris was reassigned to be the Reform Party's deputy critic of public works. He was subsequently reassigned to be the assistant critic on Transport in February 1997, a role he filled until the end of the parliamentary session in June.

== 36th Parliament ==
The next election was held in June 1997 and Harris won re-election with 54% of the vote in the Prince George—Bulkley Valley riding. The Liberal Party again formed a majority government but Harris' Reform Party formed the Official Opposition. Harris became the Vice-Chair of the 'Standing Committee on Finance' in both sessions of the 36th Parliament, as well as being the Reform Party's assistant critic on Finance.

Meanwhile, a division formed within the Reform Party as the leader, Preston Manning, explored merging the party with the Progressive Conservative Party of Canada. In April 1999, Harris became the 13th Reform Party MP to publicly oppose a merger, saying "There's nothing wrong with our product. There's nothing wrong with our brand-label. Maybe the salesmen communicating the message are not the right people out there." Harris was concerned that they would have to compromise on their opposition to official bilingualism and positions on Senate reform, family values, and justice issues. A referendum within the Reform Party on whether to explore a merger plan was called and Harris debated Manning on the issue at Reform Party events. Harris paid for national advertising opposing the merger idea and co-signed a letter distributed to all 59 Reform Party MPs which said "A Yes vote in May would be a tactical disaster... [the] Reform [Party] will be perceived as having already decided to commit suicide". The referendum passed with 60% voting in favour of a merger, dubbed the 'United Alternative'. Committees were formed to investigate a plan for merger and Harris joined the policy committee.

A second referendum was set for the Reform Party's convention in March 2000 to decide on whether to pursue the merger. Harris, in January 2000, still opposed to the United Alternative, and announced his candidacy for leader of the party — a challenge to party leader Manning who was campaigning for the merger. Harris immediately assigned a campaign chairman and launched a nationwide membership and fund-raising drives. The 55-year-old Harris viewed his campaign as staying true to the Reform Party's roots in populism and rejecting the Progressive Conservative Party's "elitist politics". Manning and those who favoured the United Alternative, like Reform Party MP Jay Hill (Prince George—Peace River) with whom Harris shared a constituency office in Prince George, saw the merger as the best way to form a government. Harris viewed the push for the United Alternative as a top-down initiative by Manning and a small group of advisers and called the United Alternative an "unholy alliance". At a late-January meeting, party members voted against launching a leadership review, ending Harris' leadership bid. At a later meeting, in March, party members voted in favour of dissolving the Reform Party of Canada and re-forming as the Canadian Reform Conservative Alliance with a new constitution and policy planks better suited for a merger with the Progressive Conservatives. When it came time to select a leader, Harris endorsed Stockwell Day, an Albertan provincial politician who went on to defeat Manning.

== 37th Parliament ==
Thou shalt not criticize the party. Thou shalt not criticize the national executive, or the president of the national executive, or any of your colleagues in caucus, or any of the caucus officers. Those are the rules. In public, that's the measure. If people stay within those rules, then they are going to be playing golf with the whip instead of having to sit down and explain themselves.

— Dick Harris, as the party whip, to the Canadian Alliance caucus, April 2001

In the November 2000 election Harris, as a member of the Canadian Alliance, was again re-elected in the Prince George–Bulkley Valley riding, this time with 59% of the vote. The Canadian Alliance again formed the Official Opposition to the Liberal Party's majority government. In the first session of the 37th Parliament, Harris served as a vice-chair of the 'Standing Committee on Finance', and a member of the 'Standing Committee on Procedure and House Affairs', the 'Standing Joint Committee on Official Languages', and the 'Standing Joint Committee for the Scrutiny of Regulations'. Fellow Canadian Alliance were criticizing the performance of their leader, Stockwell Day, during the election. In response, Day shuffled the responsibilities of his MPs in April 2001, demoting Opposition House Leader Chuck Strahl and promoting Harris to Chief Opposition Whip. Day and Harris took aggressive stances by forbidding public criticism. Art Hanger immediately spoke out against them to the media and was subsequently removed from caucus. On May 16, several Day loyalist, including Harris, co-signed a letter directed at the remaining caucus members acknowledging rumours of a parallel caucus being formed but that could not be "tolerated". The letter re-stated the formal responsibilities that all Canadian Alliance MPs agreed to and that "members will be breaching their formal written word, given to the leader, the party and their constituency, as a condition of their nomination" if they were found to "publicly attack any other colleague, the leader or the party". Hanger was followed by Chuck Strahl, Gary Lunn, Jim Pankiw, Val Meredith, Grant McNally, Jay Hill and Jim Gouk who all publicly criticized Day and withdrew or were removed from the Canadian Alliance caucus. Five more members left in June and July, including Deborah Grey. Grey accused Harris of seizing her computer and reviewing her files without her knowledge. Speaker of the House Peter Milliken investigated and ruled that Grey's "rights had been violated". In September, the dissident Canadian Alliance members formed a parallel caucus called the Democratic Representative Caucus and Day eventually conceded to a formal leadership review. Harris resigned as whip in January 2002 in order to campaign for Day's re-election as party leader. Stephen Harper won the leadership contest in April 2002 with 55% of the party votes. Under Harper, Harris remained the assistant critic on finance and he served on the 'Standing Committee on Finance' which he was a vice-chair in the 2nd session and a member in the 3rd session. Harper led the merger of the Canadian Alliance with Progressive Conservative Party to form the Conservative Party of Canada which Harris joined.

== 38th Parliament ==
In preparation for the 2004 election Harris was challenged by Williams Lake dentist Elmer Thiessen for the Conservative Party nomination. On the evening of the vote, the nomination committee headed by Dan McLaren, who supported neither Harris nor Thiessen, apparently violated Election Canada rules by unilaterally extending the vote count beyond the legal period in order to receive late mail-in ballots. Harris was in the lead before the extension decision was made. After protests, based on Elections Canada rules that all ballots must be in by the time of counting, the party ordered a second ballot take place due to voting irregularities and that constituency association officials purposely restricted voting to Williams Lake only. Harris won on the second ballot by 16 votes. The RCMP launched an investigation into Harris for alleged financial irregularities. The investigation concluded that there was no valid evidence pointing to financial irregularities. Harris went on to win the election in the Cariboo—Prince George riding with 46% of the vote and his party again formed the Official Opposition to the Liberal Party. In the 38th Parliament, Harris, as a member of the opposition, introduced one bill into the House of Commons: Bill C-275 An Act to amend the Criminal Code (failure to stop at scene of accident). Bill C-275 received first reading on November 15, 2004. In his sponsor's speech Harris said,

[The bill] would ensure that perpetrators of such violent and criminal acts are held responsible and accountable for their actions. The bill is long overdue. It would eliminate plea bargaining for hit and run offences, which is sorely needed. It would provide a minimum sentence of seven years in prison for those convicted of hit and run causing death, which is sorely needed. It would provide a minimum of four years in prison for those convicted of hit and run causing bodily harm, which again is sorely needed. To date, perpetrators of hit and run offences causing bodily harm or death have almost never received more than two years for this violent crime. The tragedy of our justice system is that it has become so sick that people who commit violent crimes are simply not dealt with in a manner that is acceptable to our society. Whenever we read something like this in the paper where the convicted person was let off with a slap on the wrist for a violent crime they committed, I, like Canadians all across this country, just roll our eyes and ask where the justice is. What is wrong with our justice system that this could be allowed to happen over and over again? Bill C-275, Carley's law, would bring sentences for hit and run offences in line with sentencing guidelines for other violent crimes, namely manslaughter and attempted murder, because it is as serious a crime as manslaughter or attempted murder.

— Mr. Richard Harris (Cariboo—Prince George, CPC), March 8, 2005

The Minister of Justice did not support bill based on its lack of distinction between intentionally and unintentionally not stopping at the scene of accident and its dis-proportionality to other crimes, so the bill was voted down, 194 to 94, on June 22, 2005. Meanwhile, his constituency association (most of whom had supported Harris' nomination challenger, Elmer Thiessen) formed a committee, once again headed by Dan McLaren, to investigate the financial irregularities charges, eventually finding charges to be valid. The constituency association held an election in February 2005 for their board of directors. The new board withdrew the previous board's findings against Harris. A month later, the RCMP dropped its investigation due to "insufficient information". A new constituency office was opened in Williams Lake in September 2004 and an office in Quesnel in November 2005.

== 39th Parliament ==
There were no challenges to Harris for the Conservative Party nomination for the January 2006 election. He went on to win the Cariboo—Prince George riding with 50% of the vote and this time Harris' party won and formed the government. In the 39th Parliament, he served as a member of the 'Standing Committee on Natural Resources' for both sessions and as a member on the 'Legislative Committee on Bill C-2' (Tackling Violent Crime Act) during the second session. Harper appointed Harris to be the chair of the British Columbia Conservative Caucus and the party's national forestry caucus.

Harris generated controversy in August 2007 when, as chair of the BC Conservative Caucus, he appointed Houston mayor Sharon Smith as the "government go-to person" in neighbouring electoral district Skeena—Bulkley Valley. He told residents, through the media, to approach Smith rather than elected local MP Nathan Cullen, a member of an opposition party, for help with government services or lobbying for federal funding. Conservative Party spokesman Ryan Sparrow said this was not sanctioned by the party and that local residents should use their elected member of parliament. Another controversy arose when it was discovered that the Conservative Party used an "in-and-out" plan to have regional offices pay for national advertising during an election period. Opposition parties contended that the Conservatives did this to avoid campaign financing limits and attain reimbursement for the costs through Election Canada. Harris' campaign was one of many who participated (with $30,000 - 36% of his total campaign expenses for advertising), though Harris and the party maintain that they kept within the law.

== 40th Parliament ==
In the October 2008 election Harris was re-elected in the Cariboo—Prince George riding with 55% of the vote and his party again formed a minority government. During the campaign he received criticism for being "invisible" and living a semi-retired life in Kelowna some 600 km from his constituency. Harris maintained an apartment in Prince George on Range Road during this period. He does not own property in Kelowna. However, he responded to specific residency questions by suggesting that his long-term residence (over 50 years in the area) in Prince George qualifies him to represent the region. In the 40th Parliament, he served as a member of the 'Standing Committee on International Trade' in the 2nd session and on the 'Standing Committee on Natural Resources' during the 3rd session. He retained his chairmanship of the Conservative's national forestry caucus and the BC Caucus. Government opposition members and local critics, called Harris to task for failing to read the Canada/US Softwood Lumber Agreement, however, letters to newspapers from the major forestry companies in his province supported him for the work he did on their behalf during the Softwood Lumber negotiations.

== 41st Parliament ==
As the incumbent seeking re-election, there were no nomination challenges and Harris was automatically acclaimed as the Conservative Party candidate in Cariboo—Prince George riding. In the May 2011 election he faced UNBC student Jon Van Barneveld for the NDP, rancher Heidi Redl for the Green Party, UBC student Sangeeta Lalli for the Liberal Party, pilot Henry Thiessen for the Christian Heritage Party, UNBC student Jordan Turner for the Rhinoceros Party, and independent Jon Ronan. While Jon Van Barneveld was likely Harris' greatest opponent since his first election, Harris won the riding with 56% of the vote and his Conservative Party formed a majority government. During the 2011 election, Harris came under fire by Van Barneveld and the media based on his vote on a national wood-first policy in the previous parliament

"Dick Harris voted against our interests and voted against the wood first policy, Bill C-429 not once, not twice, but three times in 2010," said Van Barneveld."

As the 41st Parliament began, Harris was assigned to the Standing Committee on Natural Resources and then moved to the Standing Committee on Veterans' Affairs. In the first session Harris introduced a Private Member's Bill (C-316) An Act to amend the Employment Insurance Act (incarceration) which will make time spent in jail ineligible as wait times in qualifying for employment insurance.

Thus, quite simply, the bill would change the EI Act so that those who serving time for crime no longer would be able to receive preferential treatment over hard-working Canadians, who deserve and need this kind of help. This bill is all about fairness for hard-working Canadians

— Mr. Richard Harris (Cariboo—Prince George, CPC), October 3, 2011

His private member's bill was introduced in October 2011 and passed by the House of Commons in May 2012 and was subsequently approved by the Senate and given royal assent.

Harris said that the significant safety enhancements to the proposed Enbridge Gateway pipeline project, go far beyond industry standards, and will ensure that "next generation" safety provisions, and structural integrity, will be present throughout the entire line.

He did not run for re-election in 2015.
