= McCuish =

McCuish is a surname. Notable people with the surname include:

- Alexander McCuish (1843–1919), Canadian merchant and politician
- Angus McCuish, Scottish footballer
- John McCuish (1906–1962), American politician
- Robert McCuish (1923–1998), Canadian politician
- Roddy McCuish, Scottish politician
