= James Fulton (Canadian politician) =

Canadian politician

Jim Fulton
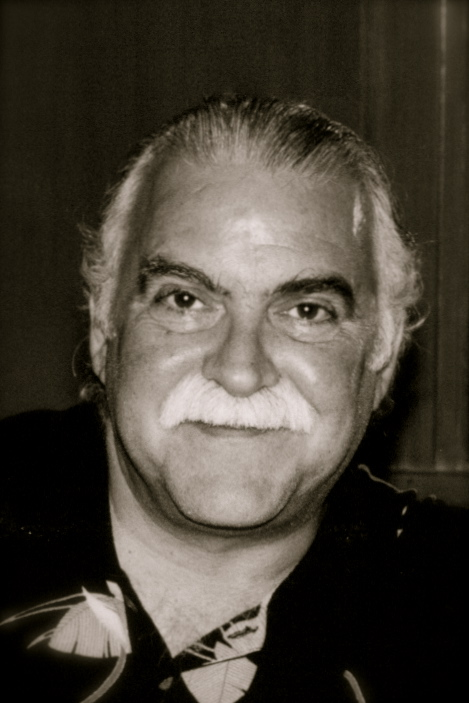
- Fulton in 2002

Member of Parliament for Skeena
- In office 1979–1993
- Preceded by: Iona Campagnolo
- Succeeded by: Mike Scott

Personal details
- Born: January 22, 1950 Edmonton, Alberta, Canada
- Died: December 21, 2008 (aged 58) Vancouver, British Columbia, Canada
- Party: New Democratic Party
- Education: Simon Fraser University
- Profession: probation officer

James Ross "Jim" Fulton (January 22, 1950 – December 21, 2008) was a New Democratic Party Member of the Parliament of Canada from British Columbia.

Educated at Simon Fraser University, Fulton worked for the province as a probation officer until he entered politics.

He was first elected to the House of Commons of Canada in the 1979 federal election in Skeena riding. He was re-elected in three subsequent elections before retiring prior to the 1993 federal election.

In Parliament, Fulton served as the NDP's Small Business Critic (1979) and as the party's environmental critic from 1980 until he left office in 1993. He also, at various times, served concurrently as forestry critic and as the party's spokesperson on aboriginal affairs. He was an early advocate of the special trust relationship owed to aboriginal peoples by the Canadian government, saying this in the House of Commons on Feb. 9th, 1988: "The Minister of Indian Affairs and Northern Development is the only Minister of the federal Crown who holds a specific trust relationship with a specific group of Canadians ... "

Fulton was active with various environmental and wildlife agencies throughout his adult life.

Fulton worked as executive director of the David Suzuki Foundation after leaving parliament.

Fulton died on December 21, 2008, in Vancouver from colon cancer.

== Archives ==
There is a James Ross Fulton fonds at Library and Archives Canada. Archival reference number is R5284.
