= Olof Hanson =

Olof Hanson may refer to:

- Olof Hanson (architect) (1862–1933), Swedish-American architect
- Olof Hanson (politician) (1882–1952), Canadian politician
