= Harry Archibald =

Canadian politician, foreman and seaman

Harry Grenfell Archibald
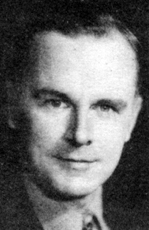

Member of Parliament for Skeena
- In office 1945–1949
- Preceded by: Olof Hanson
- Succeeded by: Edward Applewhaite

Personal details
- Born: September 21, 1910 Wynot, Saskatchewan, Canada
- Died: September 1965 (aged 54)
- Party: Co-operative Commonwealth Federation
- Profession: foreman seaman

Harry Grenfell Archibald (September 21, 1910 – September 1965) was a Canadian politician, foreman and seaman. He was born in Wynot, Saskatchewan. He was elected to the House of Commons of Canada in 1945 as a member of the Co-operative Commonwealth Federation for the riding of Skeena.

A sympathiser of Trotskyism, Archibald was a covert member of the Revolutionary Workers' Party during part of his term in Parliament. He was defeated in the elections of 1949 and 1953. Between 1943 and 1945, he served in the Royal Canadian Air Force as a Leading Aircraftman.
