= Frank Howard (Canadian politician) =

Canadian trade unionist and politician

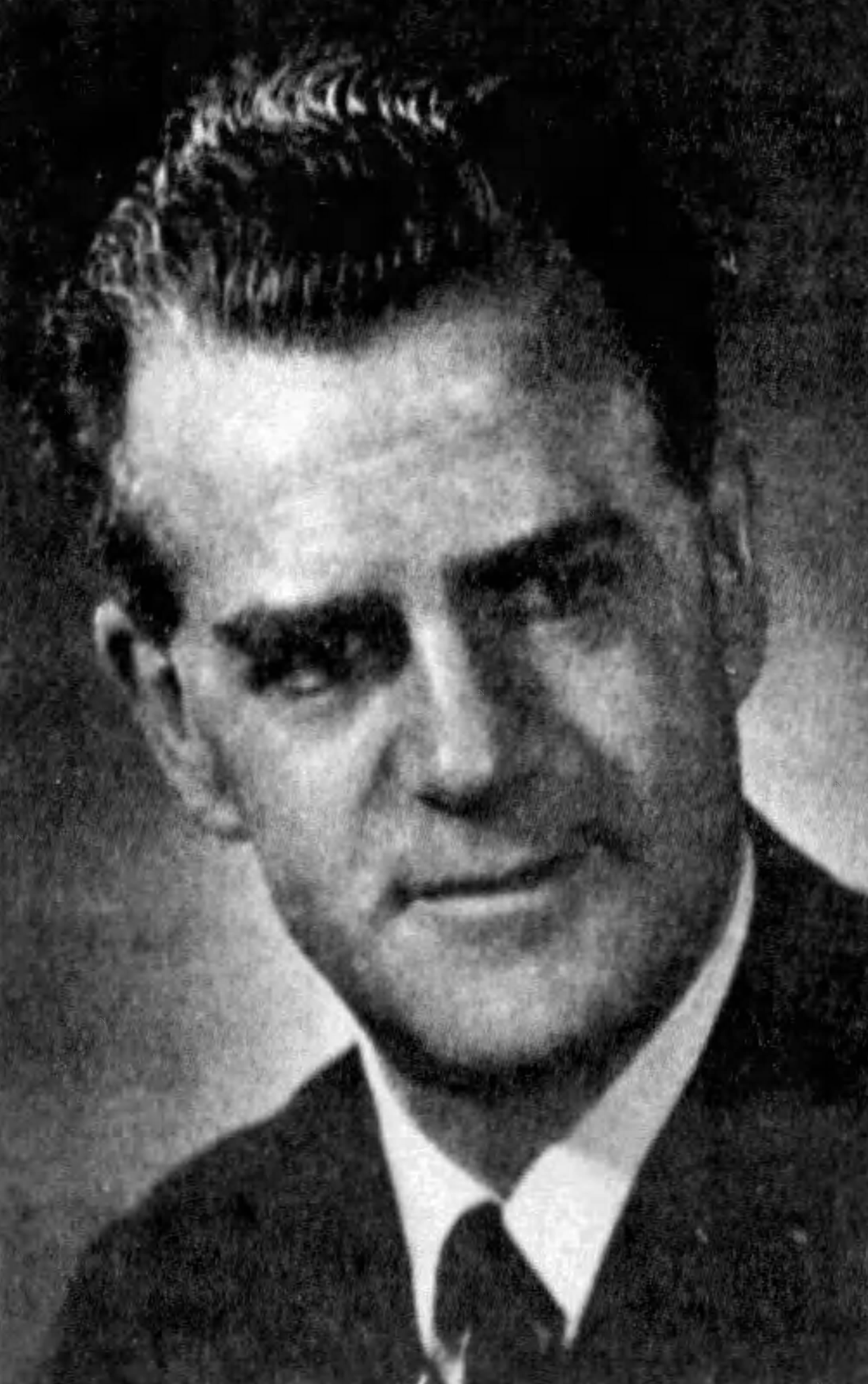
- Howard c. 1969

Member of the British Columbia Legislative Assembly for Skeena
- In office May 10, 1979 – October 22, 1986
- Preceded by: Cyril Morley Shelford
- Succeeded by: Dave Parker
- In office June 9, 1953 – September 19, 1956
- Preceded by: Edward Tourtellotte Kenney
- Succeeded by: Hugh Shirreff

Member of Parliament for Skeena
- In office June 10, 1957 – July 8, 1974
- Preceded by: Edward Applewhaite
- Succeeded by: Iona Campagnolo

Personal details
- Born: April 26, 1925 Kimberley, British Columbia, Canada
- Died: March 15, 2011 (aged 85) Surrey, British Columbia, Canada
- Party: Co-operative Commonwealth Federation; New Democratic Party

Frank Howard (April 26, 1925 – March 15, 2011) was a Canadian trade unionist and politician who served as a member of the Legislative Assembly of British Columbia (MLA) from 1953 to 1956 as a member of the Co-operative Commonwealth Federation and again from 1979 to 1986 as a member of the New Democratic Party. Between these two terms in provincial politics, he served as a member of Parliament (MP) from 1957 to 1974 representing the federal riding of Skeena.

== Early life and career ==
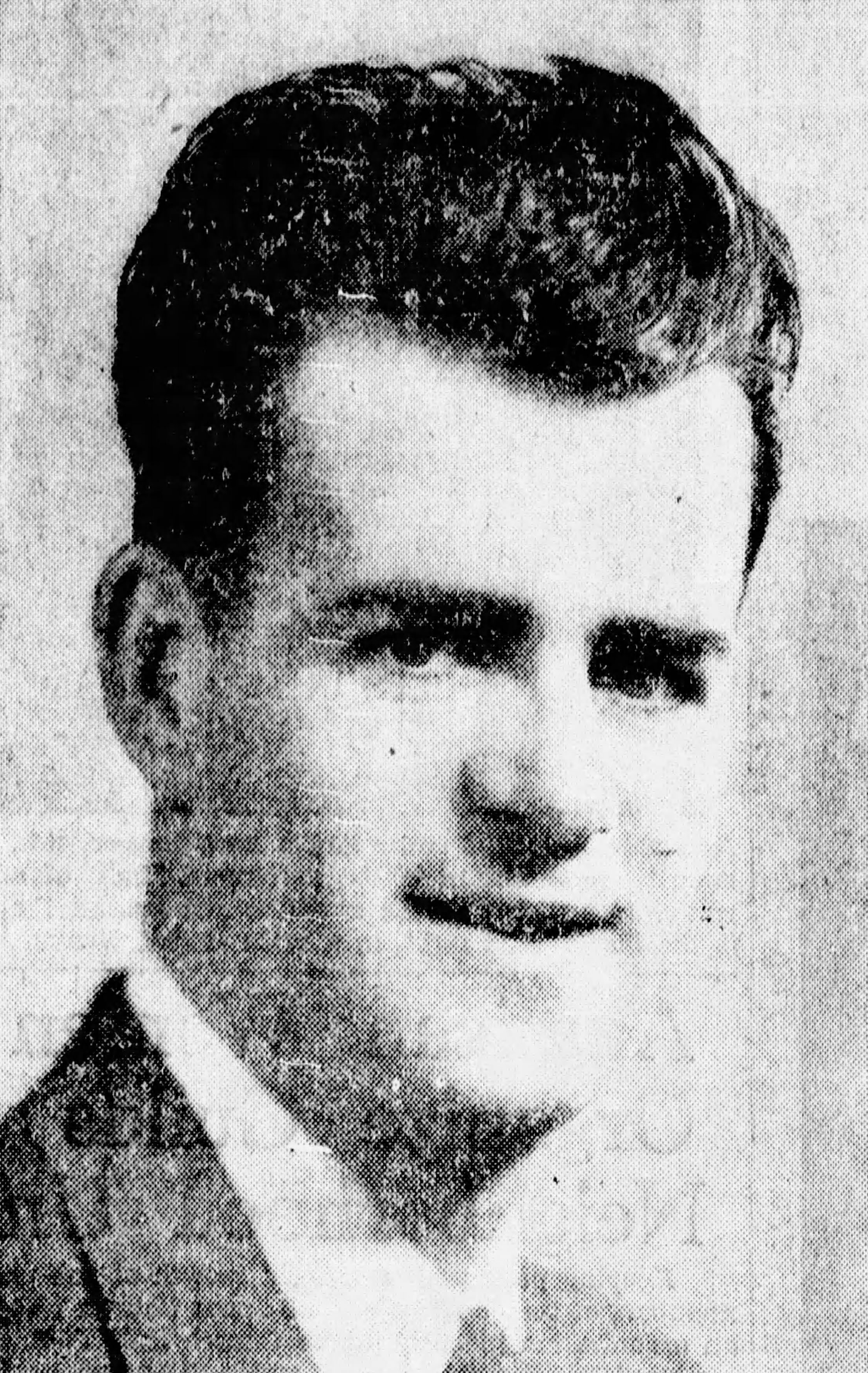
Howard c. 1956

Howard was born in Kimberley, British Columbia. After a career as a logger and labour union organizer, he was elected to the Legislative Assembly of British Columbia as a BC CCF MLA in 1953 (he had been an unsuccessful candidate in the 1952 provincial election). He was defeated in 1956 but won a seat in the House of Commons representing Skeena in the 1957 election.

== House of Commons ==
Howard first sat as a member of the Co-operative Commonwealth Federation and then for its successor, the New Democratic Party (NDP). In Parliament, Howard and his caucus colleague Arnold Peters were responsible for reforming Canada's divorce laws, and for achieving significant reforms to Canada's prison system. He was also instrumental in attaining full voting rights for Canadian First Nations.

Howard stood as a candidate in the 1971 NDP leadership convention, finishing fifth. He was a Member of Parliament for seventeen years until he lost his seat in the 1974 general election.

== Later career and death ==
In 1979, Howard returned to politics, running again for the Legislative Assembly of British Columbia. He won that election and served as Skeena's Member of the Legislative Assembly until his defeat in the 1986 provincial election.

Howard died on March 15, 2011, at the age of 85.

== From Prison to Parliament ==
Howard published an autobiography, From Prison to Parliament, in 2003, the title referring to his overcoming a troubled upbringing. Howard's mother worked as a prostitute on the outskirts of Kootenay River Valley, a mining town, while his father was believed to have been her pimp. Involved with petty thievery as a child, a judge determined that he was neglected and sent him to an orphanage at the age of 12 from which he was sent to a succession of foster homes. During World War II, he found work on a Vancouver shipyard then, in the summer of 1943, engaged in a month-long crime spree with an accomplice, robbing two jewellery stores and a hotel while armed with a revolver. Howard was convicted of three counts of armed robbery and sentenced to two years on each charge, ultimately serving 20 months in the federal penitentiary before being released on May 1, 1945.

After leaving prison he changed his name from Frank Thomas Woodd and found work as a logger, ultimately becoming an organizer for the International Woodworkers of America and serving as president of Local 1-71 for seven years before entering politics in 1952 and then winning his first election in 1953. Howard made his criminal record public in an interview with CFTK-TV on April 16, 1967; two weeks prior, he had received a blackmail letter in the mail. He made it clear that he did not plan on resigning over the confession, and he was reelected the following year.

== Archives ==
There is a Frank Howard fonds at Library and Archives Canada. Archival reference number is R3507.

Parliament of Canada
Preceded by Edward Kenney (Lib)	Member BC Legislative Assembly for Skeena; 1953–1956	Succeeded by Hugh Shirreff (Socred)
Preceded by Edward Applewhaite	Member of Parliament for Skeena; 1957–1974	Succeeded by Iona Campagnolo
Preceded by Cyril Shelford (Socred)	Member BC Legislative Assembly for Skeena; 1979–1986	Succeeded by David Parker (Socred)
