= Edward Applewhaite =

Canadian politician

Member of Parliament for Skeena
- In office 1949–1957
- Preceded by: Harry Archibald
- Succeeded by: Frank Howard

Personal details
- Born: 23 November 1898 Nelson, British Columbia, Canada
- Died: 12 September 1964 (aged 65)
- Party: Liberal
- Profession: life insurance agent

Edward Turney Applewhaite (23 November 1898 in Nelson, British Columbia, Canada – 12 September 1964) was a Canadian politician and life insurance agent. He was elected to the House of Commons of Canada in 1949 and re-elected in 1953 as a Member of the Liberal Party representing the riding of Skeena. He was defeated in the elections of 1945 and 1957. He became Deputy Chair of the Committee of the Whole on 16 December 1953.
