= Skeena—Bulkley Valley =

Federal electoral district in British Columbia, Canada

British Columbia electoral district
- Interactive map of riding boundaries from the 2015 federal election
- Coordinates: 57.481°N 130.4945°W

Federal electoral district
- Legislature: House of Commons
MP
Ellis Ross
Conservative
- District created: 2003
- First contested: 2004
- Last contested: 2025
- District webpage: profile, map

Demographics
- Population (2011): 90,586
- Electors (2015): 62,234
- Area (km²): 327,275
- Pop. density (per km²): 0.28
- Census division(s): Kitimat-Stikine, Skeena-Queen Charlotte, Stikine, Bulkley-Nechako, Central Coast
- Census subdivision(s): Prince Rupert, Terrace, Kitimat, Smithers, Houston, Nisga'a, Burns Lake, Telkwa, Fort St. James, Bella Bella

Skeena—Bulkley Valley is a federal electoral district in British Columbia, Canada, that has been represented in the House of Commons of Canada since 2004.

== Geography ==
This is a mostly wilderness area comprising almost the entire northwestern quarter of British Columbia, including the islands of Haida Gwaii and the large region inland from the Alaska Panhandle.

This district includes the cities of Terrace and Prince Rupert, the town of Smithers, as well as the districts of Kitimat, Hazelton, New Hazelton, Stewart, Port Edward, Houston and the villages of Masset, Burns Lake, Granisle, Telkwa and Port Clements.

== Demographics ==
Panethnic groups in Skeena—Bulkley Valley (2011−2021)
Panethnic group	2021		2016		2011	
Panethnic group	Pop.	%	Pop.	%	Pop.	%
European (Note: Statistic includes all persons that did not make up part of a visible minority or an indigenous identity.)	53,035	59.88%	53,500	60.85%	56,875	63.37%
Indigenous	29,905	33.76%	30,020	34.14%	29,220	32.56%
South Asian	1,935	2.18%	1,175	1.34%	1,225	1.36%
Southeast Asian (Note: Statistic includes total responses of "Filipino" and "Southeast Asian" under visible minority section on census.)	1,660	1.87%	1,330	1.51%	1,170	1.3%
East Asian (Note: Statistic includes total responses of "Chinese", "Korean", and "Japanese" under visible minority section on census.)	895	1.01%	940	1.07%	760	0.85%
African	500	0.56%	460	0.52%	235	0.26%
Latin American	225	0.25%	225	0.26%	115	0.13%
Middle Eastern (Note: Statistic includes total responses of "West Asian" and "Arab" under visible minority section on census.)	195	0.22%	65	0.07%	50	0.06%
Other (Note: Statistic includes total responses of "Visible minority, n.i.e." and "Multiple visible minorities" under visible minority section on census.)	215	0.24%	210	0.24%	105	0.12%
Total responses	88,570	98.75%	87,920	98.88%	89,750	99.08%
Total population	89,689	100%	88,920	100%	90,586	100%
Notes: Totals greater than 100% due to multiple origin responses. Demographics based on 2012 Canadian federal electoral redistribution riding boundaries.

== History ==
This electoral district was created in 2003 from Skeena, some of Prince George—Bulkley Valley and a small part of Cariboo—Chilcotin riding.

The 2012 federal electoral boundaries redistribution concluded that the electoral boundaries of Skeena—Bulkley Valley should be adjusted slightly, and a modified electoral district of the same name has been contested in elections thereafter. The redefined Skeena—Bulkley Valley gained a small portion of territory in the upper Bella Coola Valley from the district of Cariboo—Prince George but was otherwise unchanged. These new boundaries were legally defined in the 2013 representation order, which came come into effect upon the call of the 2015 election.

=== Member of Parliament ===
This riding has elected the following members of Parliament:

Parliament	Years	Member	Party
Skeena—Bulkley Valley; Riding created from Skeena, Prince George—Bulkley Valley and Cariboo—Chilcotin
38th	2004–2006	Nathan Cullen	New Democratic
39th	2006–2008	Nathan Cullen	New Democratic
40th	2008–2011	Nathan Cullen	New Democratic
41st	2011–2015	Nathan Cullen	New Democratic
42nd	2015–2019	Nathan Cullen	New Democratic
43rd	2019–2021	Taylor Bachrach	New Democratic
44th	2021–2025	Taylor Bachrach	New Democratic
45th	2025–present	Ellis Ross	Conservative

=== Current member of Parliament ===
Its member of Parliament is Ellis Ross, who was formerly a member of the Legislative Assembly of British Columbia for Skeena.

== Election results ==
Graph of election results in Skeena—Bulkley Valley (minor parties that never got 2% of the vote or didn't run consistently are omitted)

2025 Canadian federal election
** Preliminary results — Not yet official **
Party	Candidate	Votes	%	±%	Expenditures
Conservative	Ellis Ross	21,202	47.18	+11.04	
New Democratic	Taylor Bachrach	17,682	39.35	–3.23	
Liberal	Inderpal Dhillon	4,924	10.96	+3.30	
Christian Heritage	Rod Taylor	602	1.34	–0.79	
Green	Adeana Young	528	1.17	–2.59	
Total valid votes/expense limit					
Total rejected ballots					
Turnout		44,938	64.98		
Eligible voters		69,154			
Conservative gain from New Democratic		Swing		+7.14	
Source: Elections Canada

2021 Canadian federal election
Party	Candidate	Votes	%	±%	Expenditures
New Democratic	Taylor Bachrach	15,921	42.58	+1.68	$63,480.61
Conservative	Claire Rattée	13,513	36.14	+2.94	$70,700.48
People's	Jody Craven	2,888	7.72	+5.42	$0.00
Liberal	Lakhwinder Jhaj	2,866	7.66	–3.94	$3,828.51
Green	Adeana Young	1,406	3.76	–4.14	$8,424.51
Christian Heritage	Rod Taylor	797	2.13	–1.17	$22,278.11
Total valid votes/expense limit		37,391	99.49	–	$131,940.03
Total rejected ballots		193	0.51	–0.10	
Turnout		37,584	55.72	–6.98	
Eligible voters		67,453			
New Democratic hold		Swing		–0.63	
Source: Elections Canada

2019 Canadian federal election
Party	Candidate	Votes	%	±%	Expenditures
New Democratic	Taylor Bachrach	16,944	40.9	-10.18	$95,825.47
Conservative	Claire Rattée	13,756	33.2	+8.41	$58,121.59
Liberal	Dave Birdi	4,793	11.6	-7.12	$33,859.91
Green	Mike Sawyer	3,280	7.9	+4.26	$7,326.84
Christian Heritage	Rod Taylor	1,350	3.3	+1.53	$23,458.48
People's	Jody Craven	940	2.3	–	$5,358.59
Independent	Danny Nunes	164	0.4	–	none listed
Independent	Merv Ritchie	157	0.4	–	none listed
Total valid votes/expense limit		41,384	100.0		
Total rejected ballots		267	0.61		
Turnout		41,651	62.7		
Eligible voters		66,421			
New Democratic hold		Swing		-9.30	
Source: Elections Canada

2015 Canadian federal election
Party	Candidate	Votes	%	±%	Expenditures
New Democratic	Nathan Cullen	22,531	51.08	-4.14	$64,149.53
Conservative	Tyler Nesbitt	10,936	24.79	-9.77	$57,890.26
Liberal	Brad Layton	8,257	18.72	+15.11	$8,887.53
Green	Jeannie Parnell	1,605	3.64	+0.44	–
Christian Heritage	Don Spratt	780	1.77	-1.19	$20,710.97
Total valid votes/expense limit		44,109	100.00		$247,884.67
Total rejected ballots		157	0.35	–	
Turnout		44,266	69.76	–	
Eligible voters		63,459			
New Democratic hold		Swing		+2.81	
Source: Elections Canada

2011 federal election redistributed results
Party	Vote	%
New Democratic	19,550	55.22
Conservative	12,236	34.56
Liberal	1,278	3.60
Others	1,208	3.41
Green	1,131	3.19

2011 Canadian federal election
Party	Candidate	Votes	%	±%
New Democratic	Nathan Cullen	19,431	55.33	+5.49
Conservative	Clay Harmon	12,117	34.50	-1.86
Liberal	Kyle Warwick	1,268	3.61	-1.93
Green	Roger Benham	1,102	3.14	-1.52
Christian Heritage	Rod Taylor	1,038	2.96	-0.29
Canadian Action	Maggie Braun	165	0.47	+0.15
Total valid votes/expense limit		35,121	100.0	
Total rejected ballots		116	0.33	+0.02
Turnout		35,237	58.86	+2.35
New Democratic hold		Swing		+3.68

2008 Canadian federal election
Party	Candidate	Votes	%	±%	Expenditures
New Democratic	Nathan Cullen	17,219	49.84	+1.51	$68,962
Conservative	Sharon Smith	12,561	36.36	+3.36	$78,636
Liberal	Corinna Morhart	1,916	5.54	-7.12	$11,687
Green	Hondo Arendt	1,613	4.66	+1.88	$511
Christian Heritage	Rod Taylor	1,125	3.25	+0.03	$28,231
Canadian Action	Mary-Etta Goodacre	112	0.32	–	$120
Total valid votes/expense limit		34,546	100.0		$97,941
Total rejected ballots		106	0.31	-0.01	
Turnout		34,652	56.51	-6.62	
New Democratic hold		Swing		-0.92	

2006 Canadian federal election
Party	Candidate	Votes	%	±%	Expenditures
New Democratic	Nathan Cullen	18,496	48.33	+11.19	$90,144
Conservative	Michael Scott	12,630	33.00	-0.70	$71,817
Liberal	Gordon Stamp-Vincent	4,845	12.66	-8.93	$19,599
Christian Heritage	Rod Taylor	1,235	3.22	-0.60	$23,835
Green	Phil Brienesse	1,064	2.78	-0.54	$7,533
Total valid votes		38,270	100.0		
Total rejected ballots		122	0.32	-0.06	
Turnout		38,392	63.13		
New Democratic hold		Swing		+5.25	

2004 Canadian federal election
Party	Candidate	Votes	%
New Democratic	Nathan Cullen	13,706	37.14
Conservative	Andy Burton	12,434	33.70
Liberal	Miles Richardson	7,965	21.59
Christian Heritage	Rod Taylor	1,408	3.82
Green	Roger Colin Benham	1,225	3.32
Marxist–Leninist	Frank Martin	161	0.44
Total valid votes		36,899	100.00
Total rejected ballots		140	0.38
Turnout		37,039	
This riding was created from Skeena, Prince George—Bulkley Valley and Cariboo—Chilcotin, which each elected a Canadian Alliance candidate in the last election. Andy Burton was the incumbent from Skeena.

== See also ==
- List of Canadian electoral districts
- Historical federal electoral districts of Canada
