= Helmut Giesbrecht =

Canadian politician and educator (1943–2020)

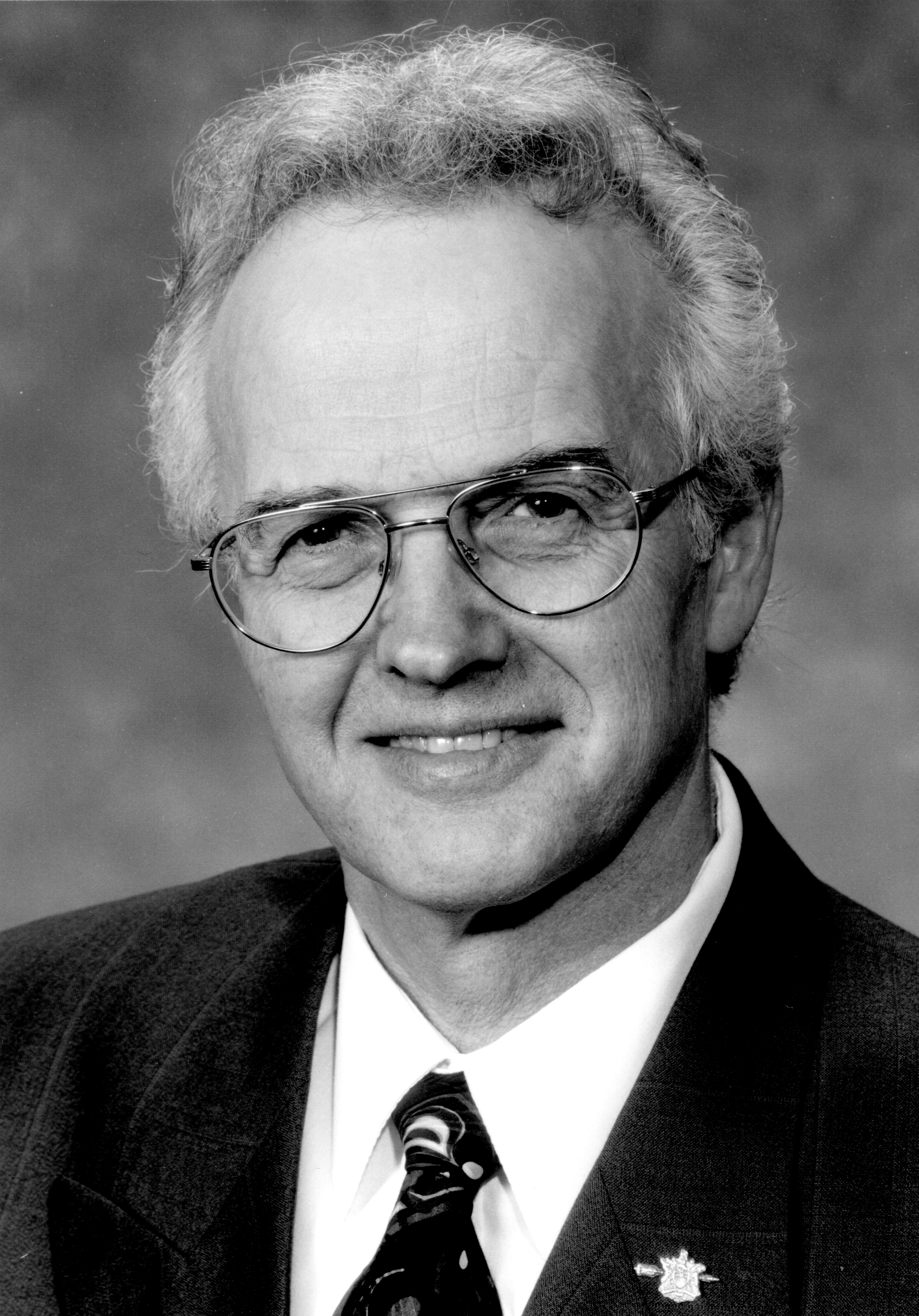

Member of the British Columbia Legislative Assembly for Skeena
- In office October 17, 1991 – May 16, 2001
- Preceded by: Dave Parker
- Succeeded by: Roger Harris

Mayor of Terrace
- In office December 1981 – December 1985

Terrace Municipal Councillor
- In office December 1976 – December 1981

Personal details
- Born: February 18, 1943; Ukraine
- Died: October 9, 2020 (aged 77); Terrace, British Columbia
- Political party: British Columbia New Democratic Party
- Spouse: Wendy Giesbrecht
- Occupation: Teacher

Helmut Giesbrecht (February 18, 1943 – October 9, 2020) was a Ukrainian-Canadian politician and educator who served as a member of the Legislative Assembly of British Columbia from 1991 to 2001. A member of the British Columbia New Democratic Party (NDP), he represented the riding of Skeena. He also served as the mayor of Terrace from 1981 to 2001.

== Career ==
Giesbrecht was born in Ukraine. He was educated at the University of British Columbia and taught in Terrace, British Columbia for 24 years. Giesbrecht was a member of the Terrace City Council, serving as mayor from 1981 to 1985. He was also a member of the executive of the Terrace District's Teachers Union, served as president of the Terrace District Teachers' Association and was a director for the Terrace and District Credit Union. He served in the provincial cabinet as Minister responsible for the Public Service (1999 to 2000) and Minister of Transportation and Highways (2001). Giesbrecht was defeated by Roger Harris when he ran for re-election in 2001.

Following the 1996 election, an unsuccessful recall campaign was launched against Giesbrecht.

Giesbrecht died on October 9, 2020, aged 77.

British Columbia provincial government of Ujjal Dosanjh
Cabinet post (1)
Predecessor	Office	Successor
Sue Hammell	Minister of Transportation and Highways; February 29, 2000–June 5, 2001	Judith Reid
British Columbia provincial government of Dan Miller
Cabinet post (1)
Predecessor	Office	Successor
cont'd from Clark Ministry	Minister Responsible for Public Service; August 25, 1999–February 24, 2000	Sue Hammell
British Columbia provincial government of Glen Clark
Cabinet post (1)
Predecessor	Office	Successor
Moe Sihota	Minister Responsible for Public Service; July 21, 1999–August 25, 1999	cont'd into Miller Ministry
