= Roger Harris (politician) =

Canadian politician

Member of the British Columbia Legislative Assembly for Skeena
- In office May 16, 2001 – May 17, 2005
- Preceded by: Helmut Giesbrecht
- Succeeded by: Robin Austin

Minister of State for Forestry Operations of British Columbia
- In office January 26, 2004 – June 16, 2005
- Premier: Gordon Campbell

Personal details
- Party: Liberal

Roger Harris is a Canadian retired politician, who served as the member of the Legislative Assembly of British Columbia from 2001 to 2005. A member of the BC Liberal party, he represented the riding of Skeena and served as Minister of State for Forestry Operations from 2004 to 2005 under Premier Gordon Campbell.
