= Robin Austin =

Canadian politician

Member of the British Columbia Legislative Assembly for Skeena
- In office May 17, 2005 – May 9, 2017
- Preceded by: Roger Harris
- Succeeded by: Ellis Ross

Personal details
- Born: April 9, 1958 (age 68) London, England, UK
- Party: New Democrat
- Occupation: Social worker

Robin Austin is a Canadian businessman and former politician. Austin served as the MLA for the electoral district of Skeena as a member of the British Columbia New Democratic Party. Austin was first elected to the Legislative Assembly in the 2005 election, and was re-elected in the 2009 election and in the 2013 election. He declined to seek re-election in 2017.

== Early life and career ==
Austin was born in London, England on April 9, 1958, but at the age of six weeks he returned with his family to Ghana, West Africa, where he remained until he was ten years old. At age ten he was sent to a British boarding school, because his father, who worked for an international company in the resource industry, moved the family frequently, and they wanted him to have some stability in his schooling.

After graduating, he attended Strathclyde University in Scotland where he received his Bachelor of Arts with a specialization in hotel management. His first job out of university was at a hotel on Grand Cayman, in the Cayman Islands. It was there that Austin met his wife Colleen, who was from Victoria, British Columbia. Shortly after, the couple moved to Toronto, where Austin worked for The Four Seasons, Hilton, and Renaissance Hotels.

After several years in Toronto, they decided to return to British Columbia and settle down in Victoria. It was here that their son, Graeme, was born. While living in Victoria, Robin opened Camille's Restaurant in Bastion Square.

When Graeme was only a year old Austin was offered a position as catering manager at the University of British Columbia. He took the job and the family moved to Vancouver where they stayed from 1990 to 1995. It was in 1995 that the couple decided to move to a smaller town, seeking a healthier environment for their son to grow up in. Eventually, they decided to move to Terrace, British Columbia.

Austin initially worked at the Terrace Best Western Hotel as food service manager, but within six weeks he had been promoted to relief manager. He continued in this position until 1999, when he was laid off due to the overall economic downturn in the area. Consequently, Austin decided to return to school, choosing to complete a Bachelor of Social Work from the University of Northern British Columbia.

Soon after moving to Terrace, Robin and Colleen decided to become foster parents, and when Graeme was only six years old they began caring for another child, who was eight. They have continuously cared for foster children since then, many of them teenagers of first nations descent.

== Political career ==
Austin's decision to go into politics was partially motivated by his belief that the BC Liberal government had a lack of concern for people in the Northwest who were affected by the economic downturn at the beginning of the millennium. Having lost his own job because of a sagging economy linked to the softwood lumber dispute and low commodity prices, Austin was frustrated by the province's lack of support for economic development in the North.

As a result, in 2004 he sought the BC NDP nomination for the Skeena constituency. He won the nomination after three ballots, and stood as the NDP candidate, narrowly winning the 2005 election.

On May 12, 2009, Austin was re-elected winning with the clear majority.

=== Fisheries ===
During his first term, Austin was the Opposition Critic for Fisheries in the NDP shadow cabinet. As chair of the Special Committee on Sustainable Aquaculture, Robin has travelled extensively through the province, listening to concerns about the social, economic and environmental impacts of aquaculture.

Members of Austin's constituency depend on a healthy wild salmon run for tourism, and for both sport and commercial fishing. Consequently, the large body of evidence suggesting that open net fish farms may lead to a decline in the population of wild salmon in river and ocean systems where they are located has led to widespread antagonism towards open net fish farming in Northern British Columbia, and particularly in the Skeena area.

The Special Committee on Sustainable Aquaculture tabled its final report in May 2007. The report included 55 recommendations on how to manage the British Columbia aquaculture industry in a way that was both economically feasible and environmentally responsible.

The report drew widespread criticism from the aquaculture industry because it called for the industry to move to ocean-based closed containment within five years. According to the report, open-net fish farms may contribute to the decline of wild salmon populations through the spread of parasitic sea lice and diseases from the farmed fish to migrating salmon fry. Industry representatives rejected the report's findings, claiming that transitioning to closed-containment would hinder the growth of British Columbia's sustainable aquaculture economy.

== Electoral record ==
2013 British Columbia general election: Skeena
Party	Candidate	Votes	%	±%	Expenditures
New Democratic	Robin Austin	5,609	47.71	-3.06	$41,610
Liberal	Carol Joan Leclerc	5,087	43.27	+5.81	$82,805
Conservative	Mike Brousseau	797	6.78	-0.95	$24,924
British Columbia Party	Trevor Hendry	263	2.24		$250
Total valid votes		11,756	100.00		
Total rejected ballots		65	0.55		
Turnout		11,821	55.85		
Source: Elections BC

B.C. General Election 2009 Skeena
Party	Candidate	Votes	%	±	Expenditures
NDP	Robin Austin	5,865	50.77	+2.47	$68,501
Liberal	Donny Van Dyk	4,328	37.46	-7.76	$84,795
Conservative	Michael Brousseau	893	7.73		$6,594
Green	Anita Norman	467	4.04	-0.74	$1,346
Total Valid Votes		11,553	100%		
Total Rejected Ballots		64	0.7%		
Turnout		11,617	55%		

B.C. General Election 2005 Skeena
Party	Candidate	Votes	%	±	Expenditures
NDP	Robin Austin	6,166	48.12%		$56,311
Liberal	Roger Harris	5,807	45.32%		$122,214
Green	Patrick Hayes	616	4.81%	–	$900
Unity	Daniel Stelmacker	224	1.75%		$1,312
Total Valid Votes		12,813	100%		
Total Rejected Ballots		89	0.7%		
Turnout		12,902	63%		
