= Andy Burton (politician) =

Canadian politician

Member of Parliament for Skeena
- In office November 27, 2000 – June 28, 2004
- Preceded by: Mike Scott
- Succeeded by: Nathan Cullen

Personal details
- Born: July 7, 1942 (age 83) Marrdgate, Yorkshire, England
- Party: Conservative
- Other political affiliations: Canadian Alliance; Reform Party
- Occupation: Property Manager

Andy Burton (born July 7, 1942) is a Canadian politician. Burton immigrated with his family to Canada from England in 1952 at the age of 10. He grew up in Prince George, British Columbia. In the early 1960s, he worked as a highway surveyor and then as a bulk plant manager for Shell Petroleum. He began his small business in 1964, and operated it until he was elected to the House of Commons of Canada in the 2000 federal election as the Canadian Alliance Member of Parliament (MP) for Skeena riding.

Burton entered politics in the 1970s. During his 24-year municipal career, he served as Mayor of Stewart, British Columbia for six years, and town councillor for 18 years.

He joined the Reform Party of Canada at its formation in 1987, and remained a member of its successors, the Canadian Alliance and the Conservative Party of Canada. In his tenure in Parliament, Burton served variously as Canadian Alliance Critic for Public Works, Fisheries and Natural Resources and then as the Conservative Party's Fisheries and Oceans critic.

On June 25, 2001, Burton was one of a dozen MPs who were expelled from or left the Canadian Alliance caucus due to their criticisms of Stockwell Day's leadership and sat as "Independent Alliance" MPs. In early September, an offer was made to the MPs that they would be readmitted to the Alliance caucus if they promised to refrain from criticizing Day's leadership. Burton accepted the offer along with four other dissident MPs, while the rest refused and formed the Democratic Representative Caucus. Burton rejoined the Canadian Alliance caucus on September 10, 2001.

Burton is a social conservative, and an opponent of abortion rights and same-sex marriage.

Burton's riding was merged into the reconfigured riding of Skeena—Bulkley Valley for the 2004 federal election, and he lost by just over 1,300 votes by Nathan Cullen of the New Democratic Party.

In November 2006, Burton ran in and won a municipal by-election in Burns Lake, British Columbia.
