= Cariboo—Prince George—Omineca =

Federal electoral district in British Columbia, Canada

Coordinates: 53.140°N 123.789°W

British Columbia electoral district
- Interactive map of riding boundaries from the 2025 federal election. Point indicates the city of Prince George.

Federal electoral district
- Legislature: House of Commons
MP
Todd Doherty
Conservative
- District created: 2003
- First contested: 2004
- Last contested: 2025
- District webpage: profile, map

Demographics
- Population (2011): 108,252
- Electors (2019): 84,116
- Area (km²): 83,193
- Pop. density (per km²): 1.3
- Census division(s): Fraser-Fort George, Bulkley-Nechako, Cariboo
- Census subdivision(s): Prince George (part), Williams Lake, Quesnel, Vanderhoof, One Hundred Mile House, Anahim's Flat, Alkali Lake, Stony Creek, Williams Lake, Canim Lake

Cariboo—Prince George—Omineca, formerly Cariboo—Prince George is a federal electoral district in the province of British Columbia, Canada, that has been represented in the House of Commons of Canada since 2004.

== Geography ==
The riding of Cariboo—Prince George—Omineca extends from near Williams Lake in the south to Prince George in the north and Vanderhoof in the west. Cities and towns in this area include Williams Lake, Quesnel, Wells, Prince George & Vanderhoof.

== History ==
This district was created in 2003 from parts of Cariboo—Chilcotin and Prince George—Bulkley Valley ridings.

The 2012 federal electoral boundaries redistribution concluded that the electoral boundaries of Cariboo—Prince George should be adjusted slightly, and a modified electoral district of the same name will be contested in future elections. The redefined Cariboo—Prince George lost a small portion of its current territory in the upper Bella Coola Valley to the district of Skeena—Bulkley Valley but is otherwise unchanged. These new boundaries were legally defined in the 2013 representation order, came into effect upon the call of the 2025 Canadian federal election, held on October 19.

The riding's name was changed to Cariboo—Prince George—Omineca as part of Bill C-25 of the 45th Canadian Parliament.

== Demographics ==
Panethnic groups in Cariboo—Prince George (2011−2021)
Panethnic group	2021		2016		2011	
Panethnic group	Pop.	%	Pop.	%	Pop.	%
European (Note: Statistic includes all persons that did not make up part of a visible minority or an indigenous identity.)	81,005	73.78%	81,335	75.93%	83,640	78.02%
Indigenous	18,915	17.23%	17,830	16.64%	17,100	15.95%
South Asian	4,195	3.82%	3,330	3.11%	2,680	2.5%
Southeast Asian (Note: Statistic includes total responses of "Filipino" and "Southeast Asian" under visible minority section on census.)	2,015	1.84%	1,445	1.35%	1,125	1.05%
East Asian (Note: Statistic includes total responses of "Chinese", "Korean", and "Japanese" under visible minority section on census.)	1,450	1.32%	1,625	1.52%	1,720	1.6%
African	1,080	0.98%	765	0.71%	525	0.49%
Latin American	410	0.37%	295	0.28%	145	0.14%
Middle Eastern (Note: Statistic includes total responses of "West Asian" and "Arab" under visible minority section on census.)	295	0.27%	160	0.15%	145	0.14%
Other (Note: Statistic includes total responses of "Visible minority, n.i.e." and "Multiple visible minorities" under visible minority section on census.)	435	0.4%	330	0.31%	120	0.11%
Total responses	109,790	98.71%	107,120	98.36%	107,200	99.03%
Total population	111,226	100%	108,907	100%	108,252	100%
Notes: Totals greater than 100% due to multiple origin responses. Demographics based on 2012 Canadian federal electoral redistribution riding boundaries.

== Members of Parliament ==
Parliament	Years	Member	Party
Riding created from Cariboo—Chilcotin and Prince George—Bulkley Valley
38th	2004–2006	Dick Harris	Conservative
39th	2006–2008	Dick Harris	Conservative
40th	2008–2011	Dick Harris	Conservative
41st	2011–2015	Dick Harris	Conservative
42nd	2015–2019	Todd Doherty	Conservative
43rd	2019–2021	Todd Doherty	Conservative
44th	2021–2025	Todd Doherty	Conservative
45th	2025–present	Todd Doherty	Conservative

== Election results ==
View source data.
Graph of election results in Cariboo—Prince George (minor parties that never got 2% of the vote or didn't run consistently are omitted)

2025 Canadian federal election: Cariboo—Prince George
Party	Candidate	Votes	%	±%	Expenditures
Conservative	Todd Doherty	38,175	60.32	+9.15	$66,941.71
Liberal	Clinton Emslie	19,243	30.40	+14.14	$10,930.88
New Democratic	Angie Bonazzo	3,900	6.16	–14.24	$8,854.62
Green	Jodie Capling	1,155	1.83	–1.66	$2,172.17
People's	Rudy Sans	436	0.69	–7.52	none listed
Independent	Kenneth B. Thomson	208	0.33	–	none listed
Christian Heritage	Jake Wiens	174	0.28	–0.10	$3,532.33
Total valid votes/expense limit		63,291	99.44	–	$173,103.06
Total rejected ballots		356	0.56	+0.04	
Turnout		63,647	68.03	+8.50	
Eligible voters		93,553			
Conservative notional hold		Swing		+11.69	
Source: Elections Canada

2021 Canadian federal election: Cariboo—Prince George
Party	Candidate	Votes	%	±%	Expenditures
Conservative	Todd Doherty	25,771	50.82	–1.85	$48,008.35
New Democratic	Audrey McKinnon	10,323	20.36	+4.95	none listed
Liberal	Garth Frizzell	8,397	16.56	–3.40	$11,247.28
People's	Jeremy Gustafson	4,160	8.20	+6.00	$5,338.68
Green	Leigh Hunsinger-Chang	1,844	3.64	–5.49	$11,400.61
Christian Heritage	Henry Thiessen	218	0.43	–	$1,147.25
Total valid votes/expense limit		50,713	99.48	–	$143,143.51
Total rejected ballots		267	0.52	–0.06	
Turnout		50,980	59.53	–5.31	
Eligible voters		85,636			
Conservative hold		Swing		–	
Source: Elections Canada

2021 federal election redistributed results
Party	Vote	%
Conservative	28,407	51.17
New Democratic	11,327	20.40
Liberal	9,029	16.26
People's	4,556	8.21
Green	1,934	3.48
Others	261	0.47

2019 Canadian federal election: Cariboo—Prince George
Party	Candidate	Votes	%	±%	Expenditures
Conservative	Todd Doherty	28,848	52.67	+16.03	$63,107.38
Liberal	Tracy Calogheros	10,932	19.96	–11.53	$32,559.60
New Democratic	Heather Sapergia	8,440	15.41	–10.42	none listed
Green	Mackenzie Kerr	4,998	9.13	+5.66	$9,512.97
People's	Jing Lan Yang	1,206	2.20	–	$8,272.26
Independent	Michael Orr	350	0.64	–	none listed
Total valid votes/expense limit		54,774	99.42	–	$138,317.65
Total rejected ballots		321	0.58	+0.18	
Turnout		55,095	64.84	–3.01	
Eligible voters		84,968			
Conservative hold		Swing		+13.78	
Source: Elections Canada

2015 Canadian federal election: Cariboo—Prince George
Party	Candidate	Votes	%	±%	Expenditures
Conservative	Todd Doherty	19,688	36.64	–19.62	$70,428.14
Liberal	Tracy Calogheros	16,921	31.49	+26.43	$28,272.16
New Democratic	Trent Derrick	13,879	25.83	–4.28	$57,795.93
Green	Richard Edward Jaques	1,860	3.46	–2.72	$2,214.20
Independent	Sheldon Clare	657	1.22	–	$13,871.81
No affiliation	Gordie Campbell	402	0.75	–	none listed
Christian Heritage	Adam De Kroon	327	0.61	–	$2,663.87
Total valid votes/expense limit		53,734	99.60	–	$265,082.81
Total rejected ballots		216	0.40	+0.01	
Turnout		53,950	67.85	+10.52	
Eligible voters		79,517			
Conservative hold		Swing		–23.02	
Source: Elections Canada

2011 federal election redistributed results
Party	Vote	%
Conservative	24,324	56.26
New Democratic	13,016	30.10
Green	2,673	6.18
Liberal	2,190	5.07
Others	1,033	2.39

2011 Canadian federal election: Cariboo—Prince George
Party	Candidate	Votes	%	±%	Expenditures
Conservative	Dick Harris	24,443	56.17	+0.78	$47,193.70
New Democratic	Jon Van Barneveld	13,135	30.18	+4.29	$8,050.42
Green	Heidi Redl	2,702	6.21	–0.19	$3,596.96
Liberal	Sangeeta Lalli	2,200	5.06	–5.49	$5,413.08
Christian Heritage	Henry Thiessen	440	1.01	–	$3,655.81
Independent	Jon Ronan	394	0.91	–	$21,600.10
Rhinoceros	Jordan Turner	204	0.47	–	$398.00
Total valid votes/expense limit		43,518	99.61	–	$107,393.11
Total rejected ballots		171	0.39	+0.02	
Turnout		43,689	57.32	+3.00	
Eligible voters		76,216			
Conservative hold		Swing		–1.76	
Source: Elections Canada

2008 Canadian federal election: Cariboo—Prince George
Party	Candidate	Votes	%	±%	Expenditures
Conservative	Dick Harris	22,637	55.39	+10.45	$73,174.73
New Democratic	Bev Collins	10,581	25.89	+2.69	$14,263.70
Liberal	Drew Adamick	4,309	10.54	–13.52	$4,986.10
Green	Amber Van Drielen	2,614	6.40	+0.86	$10.09
Independent	Douglas Gook	729	1.78	–	none listed
Total valid votes/expense limit		40,870	99.63	–	$104,005.28
Total rejected ballots		151	0.37	+0.10	
Turnout		41,021	54.32	–4.86	
Eligible voters		75,516			
Conservative hold		Swing		+11.99	
Source: Elections Canada

2006 Canadian federal election: Cariboo—Prince George
Party	Candidate	Votes	%	±%	Expenditures
Conservative	Dick Harris	19,624	44.94	–1.78	$55,222.14
Liberal	Simon Yu	10,509	24.07	+4.18	$16,389.24
New Democratic	Alfred Julian Trudeau	10,129	23.20	–3.30	$13,693.41
Green	Alex Bracewell	2,416	5.53	+1.27	$4,909.28
Christian Heritage	Chris Kempling	505	1.16	–	$3,910.36
Canadian Action	Bev Collins	279	0.64	–0.33	$2,841.12
Marxist–Leninist	Carol Lee Chapman	109	0.25	+0.06	none listed
First Peoples National	Don Roberts	95	0.22	–	none listed
Total valid votes/expense limit		43,666	99.73	–	$96,598.33
Total rejected ballots		119	0.27	–0.11	
Turnout		43,785	59.18	+1.75	
Eligible voters		73,985			
Conservative hold		Swing		–2.98	
Source: Elections Canada

2004 Canadian federal election: Cariboo—Prince George
Party	Candidate	Votes	%	±%	Expenditures
Conservative	Dick Harris	19,721	46.72	–	$49,488.76
New Democratic	Rick Smith	11,183	26.49	–	$17,129.83
Liberal	Gurbux Saini	8,397	19.89	–	$70,229.59
Green	Douglas Gook	1,798	4.26	–	none listed
Independent	Mike Orr	478	1.13	–	$1,388.89
Canadian Action	Bev Collins	408	0.97	–	$188.36
Libertarian	Jeff Paetkau	148	0.35	–	$370.00
Marxist–Leninist	Carol Lee Chapman	79	0.19	–	$75.00
Total valid votes/expense limit		42,212	99.62	–	$93,715.07
Total rejected ballots		160	0.38	–	
Turnout		42,372	57.43	–	
Eligible voters		73,778			
Conservative notional hold		Swing		–	
This riding was created from parts of Cariboo—Chilcotin and Prince George—Bulkley Valley, both of which elected a Canadian Alliance candidate in the previous election. Dick Harris was the incumbent from Prince George—Bulkley Valley.
Source: Elections Canada

== See also ==
- List of Canadian electoral districts
- Historical federal electoral districts of Canada
