= Skeena (federal electoral district) =

Former federal electoral district in British Columbia, Canada

British Columbia electoral district

Defunct federal electoral district
- Legislature: House of Commons
- District created: 1914
- District abolished: 2003
- First contested: 1917
- Last contested: 2000

Skeena was a federal electoral district in British Columbia, Canada, that was represented in the House of Commons of Canada from 1917 to 2004.

== Geography ==
This was a rural, mostly wilderness, riding in northwestern BC It consisted of the northwest corner of the province of British Columbia, including the towns of Prince Rupert, Smithers and Terrace, and Haida Gwaii.

== History ==
This riding was created in 1914 from parts of Comox—Atlin. It was first used in the 1917 federal election. The district was abolished in 2003. It was merged with portions of Prince George—Bulkley Valley and Cariboo—Chilcotin to form Skeena—Bulkley Valley.

== Members of Parliament ==
This riding elected the following members of Parliament:

Parliament	Years	Member	Party
Riding crested from Comox—Atlin
13th	1917–1921	Cyrus Wesley Peck	Government (Unionist)
14th	1921–1925	Alfred Stork	Liberal
15th	1925–1926	Alfred Stork	Liberal
16th	1926–1930	James Charles Brady	Conservative
17th	1930–1935	Olof Hanson	Liberal
18th	1935–1940	Olof Hanson	Liberal
19th	1940–1945	Olof Hanson	Liberal
20th	1945–1949	Harry Archibald	Co-operative Commonwealth
21st	1949–1953	Edward Applewhaite	Liberal
22nd	1953–1957	Edward Applewhaite	Liberal
23rd	1957–1958	Frank Howard	Co-operative Commonwealth
24th	1958–1961	Frank Howard	Co-operative Commonwealth
24th	1961–1962	Frank Howard	New Democratic
25th	1962–1963	Frank Howard	New Democratic
26th	1963–1965	Frank Howard	New Democratic
27th	1965–1968	Frank Howard	New Democratic
28th	1968–1972	Frank Howard	New Democratic
29th	1972–1974	Frank Howard	New Democratic
30th	1974–1979	Iona Campagnolo	Liberal
31st	1979–1980	James Fulton	New Democratic
32nd	1980–1984	James Fulton	New Democratic
33rd	1984–1988	James Fulton	New Democratic
34th	1988–1993	James Fulton	New Democratic
35th	1993–1997	Mike Scott	Reform
36th	1997–2000	Mike Scott	Reform
36th	2000–2000	Mike Scott	Alliance
37th	2000–2003	Andy Burton	Alliance
37th	2003–2004	Andy Burton	Conservative
Riding dissolved into Skeena—Bulkley Valley

== Election results ==
2000 Canadian federal election
Party	Candidate	Votes	%	±%	Expenditures
Alliance	Andy Burton	12,787	42.73	+0.37	$31,566
Liberal	Rhoda Witherly	8,714	29.12	+8.87	$40,113
New Democratic	Larry Guno	6,273	20.96	–10.21	$39,490
Progressive Conservative	Devin Lee Glowinski	965	3.22	–0.27	none listed
Green	Roger Benham	688	2.30	–	$253
Independent	George Joseph	361	1.21	–	$14,292
Natural Law	Cliff Brown	140	0.47	–	none listed
Total valid votes		29,928	99.59		
Total rejected ballots		122	0.41	–0.07	
Turnout		30,050	59.67	–3.99	
Eligible voters		50,363			
Alliance hold		Swing		–4.24	
Change for the Canadian Alliance is based on the results of the Reform party.
Source: Elections Canada

1997 Canadian federal election
Party	Candidate	Votes	%	±%	Expenditures
Reform	Mike Scott	13,402	42.35	+4.45	$56,933
New Democratic	Isaac Sobol	9,863	31.17	+10.52	$38,320
Liberal	Rhoda Witherly	6,408	20.25	–3.72	$37,343
Progressive Conservative	Kent Glowinski	1,106	3.50	–3.26	$3,219
Christian Heritage	Rod Freeman	864	2.73	+0.69	$6,556
Total valid votes		31,643	99.53		
Total rejected ballots		150	0.47	+0.07	
Turnout		31,793	63.66	+0.74	
Eligible voters		49,944			
Reform hold		Swing		–3.04	
Source: Elections Canada

1993 Canadian federal election
Party	Candidate	Votes	%	±%
Reform	Mike Scott	11,994	37.90	+37.01
Liberal	Rhoda Witherly	7,586	23.97	+9.41
New Democratic	Joe Barrett	6,535	20.65	–32.05
National	Isaac Sobol	2,420	7.65	–
Progressive Conservative	Danny Sheridan	2,137	6.75	–21.52
Christian Heritage	Louis Luke Kwantes	647	2.04	–1.53
Green	Peter Ewart Mehling	178	0.56	–
Natural Law	Calvin Danyluk	150	0.47	–
Total valid votes		31,647	99.60	
Total rejected ballots		128	0.40	+0.09
Turnout		31,775	62.92	–14.09
Eligible voters		50,502		
Reform gain from New Democratic		Swing		+34.53
Source: Elections Canada

1988 Canadian federal election
Party	Candidate	Votes	%	±%
New Democratic	James Fulton	16,815	52.70	+6.91
Progressive Conservative	Ray Halvorson	9,023	28.28	–7.93
Liberal	Odd Eidsvik	4,646	14.56	–2.01
Christian Heritage	Tom Brophy	1,142	3.58	–
Reform	Don Buckland	284	0.89	–
Total valid votes		31,910	99.69	
Total rejected ballots		99	0.31	–0.01
Turnout		32,009	77.01	+3.02
Eligible voters		41,567		
New Democratic hold		Swing		+7.42
Source: Elections Canada

1984 Canadian federal election
Party	Candidate	Votes	%	±%
New Democratic	James Fulton	14,174	45.79	–3.73
Progressive Conservative	Pete Weeber	11,209	36.21	+13.12
Liberal	Elmer Derrick	5,130	16.57	–10.06
Rhinoceros	Douglas Boss Hogg Craig	443	1.43	–
Total valid votes		30,956	99.68	
Total rejected ballots		99	0.32	+0.02
Turnout		31,055	73.99	+6.15
Eligible voters		41,973		
New Democratic hold		Swing		–8.42
Source: Elections Canada

1980 Canadian federal election
Party	Candidate	Votes	%	±%
New Democratic	James Fulton	13,280	49.52	+7.70
Liberal	Jack Talstra	7,141	26.63	–12.85
Progressive Conservative	Allan T. Sheppard	6,191	23.09	+6.21
Independent	Anthony Tony Organ	205	0.76	–1.06
Total valid votes		26,817	99.70	
Total rejected ballots		81	0.30	+0.08
Turnout		26,898	67.84	–7.02
Eligible voters		39,651		
New Democratic hold		Swing		+10.28
Source: Elections Canada

1979 Canadian federal election
Party	Candidate	Votes	%	±%
New Democratic	James Fulton	10,996	41.82	+11.02
Liberal	Iona Campagnolo	10,381	39.48	–0.73
Progressive Conservative	Rod Cousins	4,437	16.88	–12.11
Independent	Anthony Tony Organ	384	1.46	–
Independent	Franz G. Colet	95	0.36	–
Total valid votes		26,293	99.78	
Total rejected ballots		59	0.22	–0.16
Turnout		26,352	74.86	+5.39
Eligible voters		35,204		
New Democratic gain from Liberal		Swing		+5.88
Source: Elections Canada

1974 Canadian federal election
Party	Candidate	Votes	%	±%
Liberal	Iona Campagnolo	12,218	40.21	+18.00
New Democratic	Frank Howard	9,358	30.80	–16.97
Progressive Conservative	Everett Stevens	8,806	28.98	–1.04
Total valid votes		30,382	99.62	
Total rejected ballots		116	0.38	–0.84
Turnout		30,498	69.47	+1.83
Eligible voters		43,901		
Liberal gain from New Democratic		Swing		+17.48
Source: Library of Parliament

1972 Canadian federal election
Party	Candidate	Votes	%	±%
New Democratic	Frank Howard	13,100	47.77	–4.42
Progressive Conservative	Everett Stevens	8,234	30.02	+15.16
Liberal	John E. Mitchell	6,091	22.21	–10.74
Total valid votes		27,425	98.78	
Total rejected ballots		340	1.22	+0.31
Turnout		27,765	67.64	–3.42
Eligible voters		41,047		
New Democratic hold		Swing		–9.79
Source: Library of Parliament

1968 Canadian federal election
Party	Candidate	Votes	%	±%
New Democratic	Frank Howard	12,471	52.19	–1.80
Liberal	Art Bates	7,874	32.95	+2.69
Progressive Conservative	Vern Ciccone	3,552	14.86	+10.24
Total valid votes		23,897	99.09	
Total rejected ballots		220	0.91	–0.63
Turnout		24,117	71.06	–1.10
Eligible voters		33,940		
New Democratic hold		Swing		–2.25
Source: Library of Parliament

1965 Canadian federal election
Party	Candidate	Votes	%	±%
New Democratic	Frank Howard	11,477	53.98	+0.87
Liberal	Art Bates	6,433	30.26	+6.23
Social Credit	Dave Rea	2,368	11.14	–0.50
Progressive Conservative	Philip Pickering	982	4.62	–6.60
Total valid votes		21,260	98.46	
Total rejected ballots		332	1.54	+0.77
Turnout		21,592	72.15	–4.55
Eligible voters		29,925		
New Democratic hold		Swing		–2.68
Source: Library of Parliament

1963 Canadian federal election
Party	Candidate	Votes	%	±%
New Democratic	Frank Howard	10,743	53.11	–6.65
Liberal	John F. Magor	4,860	24.03	–
Social Credit	Lewis G. Madley	2,353	11.63	–4.92
Progressive Conservative	Ronald John Jephson	2,270	11.22	–12.46
Total valid votes		20,226	99.23	
Total rejected ballots		156	0.77	–0.67
Turnout		20,382	76.70	+5.42
Eligible voters		26,572		
New Democratic hold		Swing		–15.34
Source: Library of Parliament

1962 Canadian federal election
Party	Candidate	Votes	%	±%
New Democratic	Frank Howard	10,946	59.77	+19.96
Progressive Conservative	Bill Vance	4,338	23.69	–6.42
Social Credit	Lewis G. Madley	3,031	16.55	+11.30
Total valid votes		18,315	98.56	
Total rejected ballots		267	1.44	+0.49
Turnout		18,582	71.28	–4.37
Eligible voters		26,068		
New Democratic hold		Swing		+13.19
Source: Library of Parliament

1958 Canadian federal election
Party	Candidate	Votes	%	±%
Co-operative Commonwealth	Frank Howard	6,647	39.80	+0.75
Progressive Conservative	Allan D. Vance	5,028	30.11	+4.80
Liberal	Edward Tourtellotte Kenney	4,148	24.84	–10.80
Social Credit	Rudolph Rapske	876	5.25	–
Total valid votes		16,699	99.06	
Total rejected ballots		159	0.94	–0.01
Turnout		16,858	75.65	+11.75
Eligible voters		22,283		
Co-operative Commonwealth hold		Swing		–2.02
Source: Library of Parliament

1957 Canadian federal election
Party	Candidate	Votes	%	±%
Co-operative Commonwealth	Frank Howard	5,517	39.05	+8.62
Liberal	Edward Applewhaite	5,035	35.64	–7.93
Progressive Conservative	Duncan Kerr	3,575	25.31	–
Total valid votes		14,127	99.05	
Total rejected ballots		136	0.95	–0.61
Turnout		14,263	63.91	+4.53
Eligible voters		22,318		
Co-operative Commonwealth gain from Liberal		Swing		+8.28
Source: Library of Parliament

1953 Canadian federal election
Party	Candidate	Votes	%	±%
Liberal	Edward Applewhaite	5,332	43.57	–14.72
Co-operative Commonwealth	Harry Archibald	3,724	30.43	–11.27
Social Credit	James Thomas McKelvie	2,880	23.54	–
Labor–Progressive	Ann Minard	301	2.46	–
Total valid votes		12,237	98.44	
Total rejected ballots		194	1.56	+0.80
Turnout		12,431	59.37	–7.26
Eligible voters		20,937		
Liberal hold		Swing		–1.74
Source: Library of Parliament

1949 Canadian federal election
Party	Candidate	Votes	%	±%
Liberal	Edward Applewhaite	5,847	58.30	+28.20
Co-operative Commonwealth	Harry Archibald	4,183	41.70	+4.87
Total valid votes		10,030	99.24	
Total rejected ballots		77	0.76	–0.31
Turnout		10,107	66.64	–9.80
Eligible voters		15,167		
Liberal gain from Co-operative Commonwealth		Swing		+11.67
Source: Library of Parliament

1945 Canadian federal election
Party	Candidate	Votes	%	±%
Co-operative Commonwealth	Harry Archibald	4,079	36.83	+6.70
Liberal	Edward Applewhaite	3,333	30.09	–22.65
Progressive Conservative	James Teetzel Harvey	2,184	19.72	+4.13
Labor–Progressive	Bruce Edmon Mickleburgh	1,479	13.35	–
Total valid votes		11,075	98.93	
Total rejected ballots		120	1.07	–0.23
Turnout		11,195	76.44	–2.71
Eligible voters		14,646		
Co-operative Commonwealth gain from Liberal		Swing		+14.68
Source: Library of Parliament

1940 Canadian federal election
Party	Candidate	Votes	%	±%
Liberal	Olof Hanson	4,980	52.74	+5.55
Co-operative Commonwealth	George W. Weaver	2,845	30.13	–
National Government	George F. Cameron	1,472	15.59	–16.02
Independent Liberal	Frank Morris	145	1.54	–
Total valid votes		9,442	98.69	
Total rejected ballots		125	1.31	–0.15
Turnout		9,567	79.14	+7.70
Eligible voters		12,088		
Liberal hold		Swing		–12.29
Source: Library of Parliament

1935 Canadian federal election
Party	Candidate	Votes	%	±%
Liberal	Olof Hanson	3,898	47.19	–8.10
Conservative	Joseph Edgar Panter	2,611	31.61	–13.10
Reconstruction	Cyril Hodgins Orme	1,751	21.20	–
Total valid votes		8,260	98.54	
Total rejected ballots		122	1.46	+1.46
Turnout		8,382	71.45	–10.78
Eligible voters		11,732		
Liberal hold		Swing		+2.50
Source: Library of Parliament

1930 Canadian federal election
Party	Candidate	Votes	%	±%
Liberal	Olof Hanson	5,351	55.29	+7.29
Conservative	James Charles Brady	4,327	44.71	–7.29
Total valid votes		9,678	100.00	
Total rejected ballots		–		
Turnout		9,678	82.23	+7.37
Eligible voters		11,770		
Liberal gain from Conservative		Swing		+7.29
Source: Library of Parliament

1926 Canadian federal election
Party	Candidate	Votes	%	±%
Conservative	James Charles Brady	4,170	52.00	+11.94
Liberal	Alfred Stork	3,849	48.00	–1.51
Total valid votes		8,019	100.00	
Total rejected ballots		–		
Turnout		8,019	74.86	–2.27
Eligible voters		10,712		
Conservative gain from Liberal		Swing		+6.72
Source: Library of Parliament

1925 Canadian federal election
Party	Candidate	Votes	%	±%
Liberal	Alfred Stork	3,633	49.51	–0.78
Conservative	George Gordon Bushby	2,940	40.07	–9.64
Progressive	George Watson Nickerson	765	10.43	–
Total valid votes		7,338	100.00	
Total rejected ballots		–		
Turnout		7,338	77.13	+9.62
Eligible voters		9,514		
Liberal hold		Swing		+4.43
Source: Library of Parliament

1921 Canadian federal election
Party	Candidate	Votes	%	±%
Liberal	Alfred Stork	3,261	50.29	+7.36
Conservative	Cyrus Wesley Peck	3,223	49.71	–7.36
Total valid votes		6,484	100.00	
Total rejected ballots		–		
Turnout		6,484	67.51	–33.75
Eligible voters		9,605		
Liberal gain from Government (Unionist)		Swing		+7.36
Source: Library of Parliament

1917 Canadian federal election
Party	Candidate	Votes	%
Government (Unionist)	Cyrus Wesley Peck	2,806	57.07
Opposition (Laurier Liberals)	Alfred Stork	2,111	42.93
Total valid votes		4,917	100.00
Total rejected ballots		–	
Turnout		4,917	101.26
Eligible voters		4,856	
This riding was created from parts of Comox—Atlin, which elected a Conservative in the previous election.
Source: Library of Parliament

== See also ==
- List of Canadian electoral districts
- Historical federal electoral districts of Canada
