= Hartley Douglas Dent =

Canadian politician

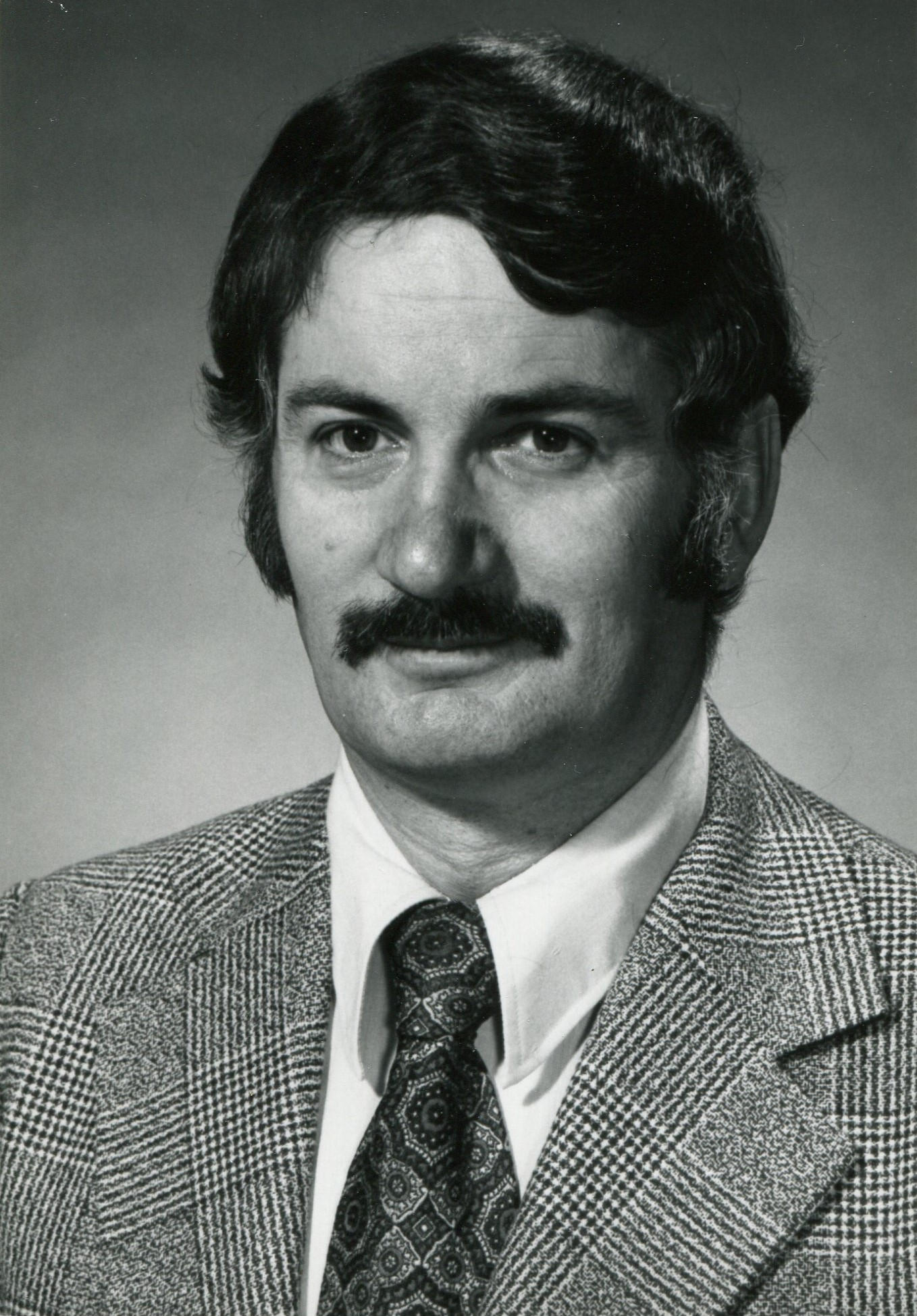

Member of the British Columbia Legislative Assembly for Skeena
- In office August 30, 1972 – November 3, 1975
- Preceded by: Unknown
- Succeeded by: Cyril Morley Shelford

Personal details
- Born: February 15, 1929 Limerick, Saskatchewan
- Died: July 10, 1993 (aged 64) Penticton, British Columbia
- Party: New Democratic
- Spouse: Shirley Anna Larsen

Hartley Douglas Dent (February 15, 1929 – July 10, 1993) was a Canadian politician who served as a member of the Legislative Assembly of British Columbia (MLA) from 1972 to 1975, representing the riding of Skeena. A member of the New Democratic Party, he previously ran unsuccessfully in the 1966 British Columbia general election and a subsequent 1966 byelection, both in the riding of Cariboo. During his three years in office, he also served as the deputy speaker of the Legislature.
