= Todd Doherty =

Canadian politician

Todd Doherty MP
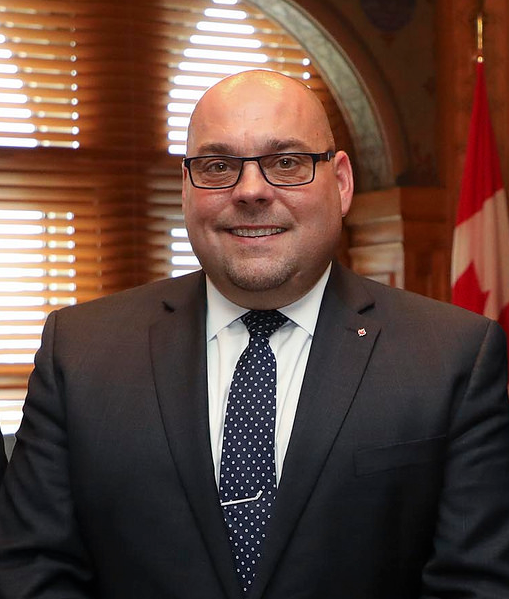

Member of Parliament for Cariboo—Prince George
- Incumbent
- Assumed office October 19, 2015
- Preceded by: Dick Harris

Personal details
- Born: 1968 or 1969 (age 56–57) Williams Lake, British Columbia, Canada
- Party: Conservative
- Spouse: Kelly Doherty
- Children: 4
- Profession: Business Owner, Aviation Executive

Todd Doherty MP (born 1968 or 1969) is a Canadian politician who was elected as a Member of Parliament in the House of Commons of Canada to represent the federal electoral district Cariboo—Prince George during the 2015 Canadian federal election.

During the first sitting of the 42nd Parliament, Doherty tabled four private members bills:

- Bill C-211: An Act to Establish a National Framework on PTSD and Mental Health Challenges with First Responders, Veterans and Military. Bill C-211 was passed unanimously June 16, 2017 and currently is in Senate for review.
- Bill C-209: This enactment amends the Corrections and Conditional Release Act to require the Correctional Service of Canada, in certain circumstances to disclose details of statutory release of a high-profile offender. Making public disclosure of the details of the release and informing any victims of such release.
- Bill C-207: This enactment designates the third day of March in each and every year as a day for the people of Canada to express appreciation for the heroic work of members of the Canadian Forces and emergency response professionals, including police officers, firefighters and paramedics
- Bill C-208: This enactment amends the Canada Evidence Act to direct courts on how to interpret a written all-numeric date in Canada that is in dispute.

In addition, Bill C-347 was authored by Doherty and calls on the Federal Government to establish a national service medal for Search & Rescue volunteers. The largest national volunteer group that was without a national medal in recognition of service.

Although authored by Doherty, he gave permission for Mel Arnold to table C-347 due to C-211's progress through Parliament.

In October 2017, the Government of Canada announced the creation of a national service medal for Search & Rescue volunteers.

In November 2020, Doherty tabled a motion to create a single national three-digit telephone number, 988, for suicide hotlines, arguing that having to look up existing 10-digit numbers presents a barrier to use. In December the House of Commons voted unanimously in favour of his proposal.

== Electoral record ==
2025 Canadian federal election: Cariboo—Prince George
Party	Candidate	Votes	%	±%	Expenditures
Conservative	Todd Doherty	38,175	60.32	+9.15	$66,941.71
Liberal	Clinton Emslie	19,243	30.40	+14.14	$10,930.88
New Democratic	Angie Bonazzo	3,900	6.16	–14.24	$8,854.62
Green	Jodie Capling	1,155	1.83	–1.66	$2,172.17
People's	Rudy Sans	436	0.69	–7.52	none listed
Independent	Kenneth B. Thomson	208	0.33	–	none listed
Christian Heritage	Jake Wiens	174	0.28	–0.10	$3,532.33
Total valid votes/expense limit		63,291	99.44	–	$173,103.06
Total rejected ballots		356	0.56	+0.04	
Turnout		63,647	68.03	+8.50	
Eligible voters		93,553			
Conservative notional hold		Swing		+11.69	
Source: Elections Canada

2021 Canadian federal election: Cariboo—Prince George
Party	Candidate	Votes	%	±%	Expenditures
Conservative	Todd Doherty	25,771	50.82	–1.85	$48,008.35
New Democratic	Audrey McKinnon	10,323	20.36	+4.95	none listed
Liberal	Garth Frizzell	8,397	16.56	–3.40	$11,247.28
People's	Jeremy Gustafson	4,160	8.20	+6.00	$5,338.68
Green	Leigh Hunsinger-Chang	1,844	3.64	–5.49	$11,400.61
Christian Heritage	Henry Thiessen	218	0.43	–	$1,147.25
Total valid votes/expense limit		50,713	99.48	–	$143,143.51
Total rejected ballots		267	0.52	–0.06	
Turnout		50,980	59.53	–5.31	
Eligible voters		85,636			
Conservative hold		Swing		–	
Source: Elections Canada

2019 Canadian federal election: Cariboo—Prince George
Party	Candidate	Votes	%	±%	Expenditures
Conservative	Todd Doherty	28,848	52.67	+16.03	$63,107.38
Liberal	Tracy Calogheros	10,932	19.96	–11.53	$32,559.60
New Democratic	Heather Sapergia	8,440	15.41	–10.42	none listed
Green	Mackenzie Kerr	4,998	9.13	+5.66	$9,512.97
People's	Jing Lan Yang	1,206	2.20	–	$8,272.26
Independent	Michael Orr	350	0.64	–	none listed
Total valid votes/expense limit		54,774	99.42	–	$138,317.65
Total rejected ballots		321	0.58	+0.18	
Turnout		55,095	64.84	–3.01	
Eligible voters		84,968			
Conservative hold		Swing		+13.78	
Source: Elections Canada

2015 Canadian federal election: Cariboo—Prince George
Party	Candidate	Votes	%	±%	Expenditures
Conservative	Todd Doherty	19,688	36.64	–19.62	$70,428.14
Liberal	Tracy Calogheros	16,921	31.49	+26.43	$28,272.16
New Democratic	Trent Derrick	13,879	25.83	–4.28	$57,795.93
Green	Richard Edward Jaques	1,860	3.46	–2.72	$2,214.20
Independent	Sheldon Clare	657	1.22	–	$13,871.81
No affiliation	Gordie Campbell	402	0.75	–	none listed
Christian Heritage	Adam De Kroon	327	0.61	–	$2,663.87
Total valid votes/expense limit		53,734	99.60	–	$265,082.81
Total rejected ballots		216	0.40	+0.01	
Turnout		53,950	67.85	+10.52	
Eligible voters		79,517			
Conservative hold		Swing		–23.02	
Source: Elections Canada
