= Ellis Ross =

Canadian politician (born 1965)

Ellis Ross OBC MP
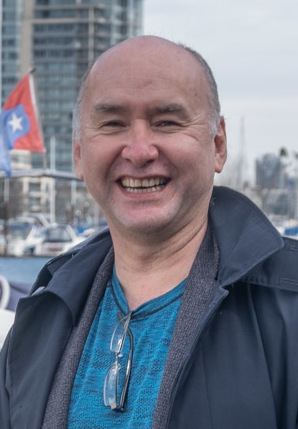
- Ross in Vancouver, March 2021

Member of Parliament for Skeena—Bulkley Valley
- Incumbent
- Assumed office April 28, 2025
- Preceded by: Taylor Bachrach

Member of the British Columbia Legislative Assembly for Skeena
- In office May 9, 2017 – September 21, 2024
- Preceded by: Robin Austin
- Succeeded by: Claire Rattée

Personal details
- Born: Ellis Benjamin Ross; 1965 (age 60–61) Kitimat, British Columbia, Canada
- Party: Conservative (federal)
- Other political affiliations: BC United (provincial)
- Spouse: Tracey Ross
- Occupation: Politician; Indigenous leader

Ellis Benjamin Ross MP (born June 16, 1965) is a Canadian politician and Indigenous leader serving as the member of Parliament (MP) for the riding of Skeena—Bulkley Valley since 2025. A member of the Conservative Party, he was elected to the House of Commons in the 2025 federal election, marking the first time the riding has been won by the Conservatives since its formation in 2003. Prior to entering federal politics, he served as a member of the Legislative Assembly of British Columbia (MLA), representing the electoral district of Skeena from 2017 to 2024. During his provincial tenure, he held the cabinet positions as Minister of Natural Gas Development and Minister Responsible for Housing under Premier Christy Clark. He was also a candidate in the 2022 BC Liberal Party leadership race.

== Early life and career ==
Born in Kitimat as the second youngest of seven children, Ross grew up on the Haisla Nation reserve in Kitamaat Village. He conducted survey work for the Department of Fisheries and Oceans, operated a charter boat, and ran a hand logging and salvage log beachcombing business with his brother. He and his wife Tracey have two daughters together.

He became the Haisla Nation Council's first full-time councillor in 2003, and signed a $50 million agreement with Kitimat LNG in 2006 to build a liquefied natural gas (LNG) plant on one of the Haisla Nation reserves. He served in that role until his election as the Haisla Nation's Chief Councillor in 2011, and was inducted into the Order of British Columbia in 2014.

== Political career ==
=== Provincial politics (2017–2024) ===
He ran in the 2017 provincial election as a BC Liberal candidate, and was elected MLA for the riding of Skeena, while losing his home voting area of Kitimaat Village. The riding had previously been a stronghold for the New Democratic Party, with that party winning in five of the previous six elections — the only exception being the 2001 BC Liberal landslide. Upon his election, Premier Christy Clark appointed Ross to cabinet as Minister of Natural Gas Development and Minister Responsible for Housing. He finished his brief term as minister that July, following the Liberal minority government's defeat in a confidence vote on June 29. On the opposition benches, he served as critic for Natural Gas and Petroleum Resources.

Ross won re-election as MLA in 2020, and was named Official Opposition critic for Environment and Climate Change Strategy. The next year he became the first declared candidate in the Liberal Party leadership election triggered by the resignation of Andrew Wilkinson. His leadership campaign, led by Mark Werner finished in second place on the fifth ballot behind winner Kevin Falcon, while supporting the rejected candidacy of Aaron Gunn. He was named Official Opposition critic for Energy and LNG by Falcon.

=== Federal politics (2025–present) ===
In January 2024, it was announced that Ross had been nominated to become the Conservative Party's candidate for the federal district of Skeena—Bulkley Valley. He defeated incumbent New Democrat Taylor Bachrach in the 2025 federal election.

He was elected vice chair of the Canadian House of Commons Standing Committee on Environment and Sustainable Development in the 45th Canadian Parliament in 2025.

== Electoral record ==
2025 Canadian federal election: Skeena—Bulkley Valley
| Party | Candidate | Votes | % | ±% | Expenditures |
|---|---|---|---|---|---|
| Conservative | Ellis Ross | 21,202 | 47.19 | +11.05 | $136,837.68 |
| New Democratic | Taylor Bachrach | 17,677 | 39.34 | –3.24 | $124,286.63 |
| Liberal | Inderpal Dhillon | 4,923 | 10.96 | +3.30 | $35,473.42 |
| Christian Heritage | Rod Taylor | 602 | 1.34 | –0.79 | $15,116.34 |
| Green | Adeana Young | 528 | 1.18 | –2.59 | $323.14 |
| Total valid votes/expense limit | | 44,932 | 99.33 | – | $153,346.86 |
| Total rejected ballots | | 304 | 0.67 | +0.16 | |
| Turnout | | 45,236 | 64.64 | +9.44 | |
| Eligible voters | | 69,983 | | | |
| Conservative gain from New Democratic | | Swing | | +7.15 | |
Source: Elections Canada

2020 British Columbia general election: Skeena
| Party | Candidate | Votes | % | ±% | Expenditures |
|---|---|---|---|---|---|
| Liberal | Ellis Ross | 5,810 | 52.06 | −0.17 | $47,839.99 |
| New Democratic | Nicole Halbauer | 4,961 | 44.45 | +1.16 | $42,856.47 |
| Independent | Martin Holzbauer | 389 | 3.49 | – | $0.00 |
| Total valid votes | | 11,160 | 99.47 | – | |
| Total rejected ballots | | 59 | 0.53 | −0.05 | |
| Turnout | | 11,219 | 51.89 | −10.87 | |
| Registered voters | | 21,621 | | | |
| Liberal hold | | Swing | | –0.67 | |
Source: Elections BC

2017 British Columbia general election: Skeena
| Party | Candidate | Votes | % | ±% | Expenditures |
|---|---|---|---|---|---|
| Liberal | Ellis Ross | 6,772 | 52.23 | +9.02 | $60,169 |
| New Democratic | Bruce Alan Bidgood | 5,613 | 43.29 | −4.42 | $53,814 |
| Land Air Water | Merv Ritchie | 580 | 4.48 | – | |
| Total valid votes | | 12,965 | 100.00 | – | |
| Total rejected ballots | | 75 | 0.58 | +0.03 | |
| Turnout | | 13,040 | 62.76 | +6.91 | |
| Registered voters | | 20,779 | | | |
Source: Elections BC

British Columbia provincial government of Christy Clark
Cabinet posts (2)
| Predecessor | Office | Successor |
|---|---|---|
| Rich Coleman | Minister Responsible for Housing; June 12, 2017–July 18, 2017 | Selina Robinson |
| Rich Coleman | Minister Responsible for Natural Gas Development; June 12, 2017–July 18, 2017 | Ministry Abolished |
