= Skeena (provincial electoral district) =

Provincial electoral district in British Columbia, Canada

British Columbia electoral district
- Interactive map of riding boundaries

Provincial electoral district
- Legislature: Legislative Assembly of British Columbia
MLA
Claire Rattée
Conservative
- First contested: 1924
- Last contested: 2026

Demographics
- Population (2021): 30,148
- Census division: Kitimat–Stikine
- Census subdivision(s): Kitimat, Terrace

Skeena is a provincial electoral district for the Legislative Assembly of British Columbia. It was first contested in the 1924 British Columbia general election.

== Demographics ==
Population, 2021	30,148
Area (km^{2})	31,610
Pop. Density (people per km^{2})	0.95
Source: BC Electoral Boundaries Commission

== Geography ==
Skeena comprises the southern portion of the Regional District of Kitimat–Stikine, with the exception of the southern tip of the region which is part of the North Coast electoral district. It is located in western British Columbia, with the northwest bordering Alaska, United States. Communities in the electoral district consist of Terrace and Kitimat.

== Members of the Legislative Assembly ==
This riding has elected the following members of the Legislative Assembly:

Assembly	Years	Member	Party
Skeena; Riding created from Atlin and Prince Rupert
16th	1924–1928	Horace Cooper Wrinch	Liberal
17th	1928–1933	Horace Cooper Wrinch	Liberal
18th	1933–1937	Edward Tourtellotte Kenney	Liberal
19th	1937–1941	Edward Tourtellotte Kenney	Liberal
20th	1941–1945	Edward Tourtellotte Kenney	Liberal
21st	1945–1949	Edward Tourtellotte Kenney	Coalition
22nd	1949–1952	Edward Tourtellotte Kenney	Coalition
23rd	1952–1953	Edward Tourtellotte Kenney	Liberal
24th	1953–1956	Frank Howard	Co-operative Commonwealth
25th	1956–1960	Hugh Addison Shirreff	Social Credit
26th	1960–1963	Dudley George Little	Social Credit
27th	1963–1966	Dudley George Little	Social Credit
28th	1966–1969	Dudley George Little	Social Credit
29th	1969–1972	Dudley George Little	Social Credit
30th	1972–1975	Hartley Douglas Dent	New Democratic
31st	1975–1979	Cyril Morley Shelford	Social Credit
32nd	1979–1983	Frank Howard	New Democratic
33rd	1983–1986	Frank Howard	New Democratic
34th	1986–1991	David Parker	Social Credit
35th	1991–1996	Helmut Giesbrecht	New Democratic
36th	1996–2001	Helmut Giesbrecht	New Democratic
37th	2001–2005	Roger Harris	Liberal
38th	2005–2009	Robin Austin	New Democratic
39th	2009–2013	Robin Austin	New Democratic
40th	2013–2017	Robin Austin	New Democratic
41st	2017–2020	Ellis Ross	Liberal
42nd	2020–2023	Ellis Ross	Liberal
42nd	2023–2024	Ellis Ross	BC United
43rd	2024–2026	Claire Rattée	Conservative
43rd	2026–2026	Claire Rattée	Independent
43rd	2026–2026	Claire Rattée	Conservative
44th	2026–present	Claire Rattée	Conservative

== Election results ==
2026 British Columbia general election
The 2026 general election will be held on October 24.
Party	Candidate	Votes	%	±%	Expenditures
Green	Nick Gottlieb				
Conservative	Claire Rattée				
OneBC	Larry Eugene Taylor				
New Democratic	Sarah Zimmerman				
Total valid votes					
Total rejected ballots					
Turnout					
Registered voters					
Source: Elections BC

2024 British Columbia general election
Party	Candidate	Votes	%	±%	Expenditures
Conservative	Claire Rattée	6,243	51.20%	+51.20%	
New Democratic	Sarah Zimmerman	5,419	44.44%	-0.01%	
Green	Teri Young	406	3.33%	+3.33%	
Christian Heritage	Irwin Jeffrey	125	1.03%	+1.03%	
Total valid votes		12,194	–		
Total rejected ballots					
Turnout					
Registered voters					
Source: Elections BC

2020 British Columbia general election
Party	Candidate	Votes	%	±%	Expenditures
Liberal	Ellis Ross	5,810	52.06	−0.17	$47,839.99
New Democratic	Nicole Halbauer	4,961	44.45	+1.16	$42,856.47
Independent	Martin Holzbauer	389	3.49	–	$0.00
Total valid votes		11,160	99.47	–	
Total rejected ballots		59	0.53	−0.05	
Turnout		11,219	51.89	−10.87	
Registered voters		21,621			
Liberal hold		Swing		–0.67	
Source: Elections BC

2018 British Columbia electoral reform referendum
Side	Votes	%
First Past the Post	4,863	66.83
Proportional representation	2,414	33.17
Total valid votes	7,277	100.00
Rejected ballots	57	0.78
Source: Elections BC

2017 British Columbia general election
Party	Candidate	Votes	%	±%	Expenditures
Liberal	Ellis Ross	6,772	52.23	+9.02	$60,169
New Democratic	Bruce Alan Bidgood	5,613	43.29	−4.42	$53,814
Land Air Water	Merv Ritchie	580	4.48	–	
Total valid votes		12,965	100.00	–	
Total rejected ballots		75	0.58	+0.03	
Turnout		13,040	62.76	+6.91	
Registered voters		20,779			
Source: Elections BC

2013 British Columbia general election
Party	Candidate	Votes	%	±%	Expenditures
New Democratic	Robin Austin	5,609	47.71	-3.06	$41,610
Liberal	Carol Joan Leclerc	5,087	43.27	+5.81	$82,805
Conservative	Mike Brousseau	797	6.78	-0.95	$24,924
British Columbia Party	Trevor Hendry	263	2.24		$250
Total valid votes		11,756	100.00		
Total rejected ballots		65	0.55		
Turnout		11,821	55.85		
Source: Elections BC

BC General Election 2009 Skeena
Party	Candidate	Votes	%	±	Expenditures
NDP	Robin Austin	5,865	50.77	+2.47	$68,501
Liberal	Donny Van Dyk	4,328	37.46	-7.76	$84,795
Conservative	Michael Brousseau	893	7.73		$6,594
Green	Anita Norman	467	4.04	-0.74	$1,346
Total Valid Votes		11,553	100%		
Total Rejected Ballots		64	0.7%		
Turnout		11,617	55%		

BC General Election 2005 Skeena
Party	Candidate	Votes	%	±	Expenditures
NDP	Robin Austin	6,166	48.12%		$56,311
Liberal	Roger Harris	5,807	45.32%		$122,214
Green	Patrick Hayes	616	4.81%	–	$900
Unity	Daniel Stelmacker	224	1.75%		$1,312
Total Valid Votes		12,813	100%		
Total Rejected Ballots		89	0.7%		
Turnout		12,902	63%		

BC General Election 2001: Skeena
Party	Candidate	Votes	%	±	Expenditures
Liberal	Roger Harris	8,653	65.15%		$34,842
NDP	Helmut Giesbrecht	2,644	19.91%		$16,230
Green	Roger Colin Benham	695	5.23%	–	$1,893
Marijuana	Bob Erb	810	6.10%		$4,908
All Nations	Gerald Victor Amos	479	3.61%	–	$3,918
Total Valid Votes		13,281	100.00%		
Total Rejected Ballots		68	0.51%		
Turnout		13,349	72.13%		

BC General Election 1996: Skeena
Party	Candidate	Votes	%	±	Expenditures
NDP	Helmut Giesbrecht	5,353	40.34%		$29,298
Liberal	Rick Wozney	4,718	35.56%		$53,331
Reform	Andy Burton	2,744	20.68%		$21,615
Social Credit	Dave Serry	249	1.88%	–	$3,731
Green	Doug Bodnar	205	1.54%	–	$100
Total Valid Votes		13,269	100.00%		
Total Rejected Ballots		93	0.70%		
Turnout		13,362	70.72%		

BC General Election 1991: Skeena
Party	Candidate	Votes	%	±	Expenditures
NDP	Helmut Giesbrecht	5,597	46.67%		$31,137
Social Credit	Dave Parker	4,766	39.74%	–	$65,535
Liberal	Juanita Hatton	1,629	13.59%		$983
Total Valid Votes		11,992	100.00%		
Total Rejected Ballots		201	1.65%		
Turnout		12,193	72.46%		

BC General Election 1986: Skeena
Party	Candidate	Votes	%	±	Expenditures
Social Credit	David Fletcher Hewlett Parker	8,259	48.61%	–	
NDP	Frank Howard	7,101	41.79%		
Liberal	William Hayes	839	4.94%		
Independent	Sebastian Gordon	793	4.66%		$983
Total Valid Votes		16,992	100.00%		
Total Rejected Ballots		225	1.65%		
Turnout			%		

BC General Election 1983: Skeena
Party	Candidate	Votes	%	±	Expenditures
NDP	Frank Howard	9,682	51.12%		
Social Credit	Joanne B. Monaghan	8,962	47.31%	–	
Independent	Lionel Wayne Sears	297	1.57%		
Total Valid Votes		18,941	100.00%		
Total Rejected Ballots		242	1.65%		
Turnout			%		

BC General Election 1979: Skeena
Party	Candidate	Votes	%	±	Expenditures
NDP	Frank Howard	7,561	50.29%		
Social Credit	Cyril Morley Shelford	7,193	47.85%	–	
Independent	David L. McCreery	197	1.31%		
Independent	Arthur David Serry	83	0.55%		
Total Valid Votes		15,034	100.00%		
Total Rejected Ballots		233	1.65%		
Turnout			%		

BC General Election 1975: Skeena
Party	Candidate	Votes	%	±	Expenditures
Social Credit	Cyril Morley Shelford	6,863	50.00%	–	
NDP	Hartley Douglas Dent	6,145	44.77%		
Liberal	Ronald N. Gowe	484	3.52%		
Progressive Conservative	Victor Charles George Jolliffe	235	1.71%		
Total Valid Votes		13,727	100.00%		
Total Rejected Ballots		141	%		
Turnout			%		

BC General Election 1972: Skeena
Party	Candidate	Votes	%	±	Expenditures
NDP	Hartley Douglas Dent	5,442	46.90%		
Social Credit	John Frederick Weber	3,605	31.07%	–	
Liberal	Ian Charles MacDonald	1,441	12.42%		
Progressive Conservative	Richard William Sargent	1,040	8.96%		
Independent	Lionel Wayne Sears	76	0.65%		
Total Valid Votes		11,604	100.00%		
Total Rejected Ballots		206	%		
Turnout			%		

BC General Election 1969: Skeena
Party	Candidate	Votes	%	±	Expenditures
Social Credit	Dudley George Little	5,044	51.20%	–	
NDP	James Harold Robertson	4,059	41.20%		
Liberal	Kurt Theodor Kolterhoff	748	7.59%		
Total Valid Votes		9,851	100.00%		
Total Rejected Ballots		180	%		
Turnout			%		

BC General Election 1966: Skeena
Party	Candidate	Votes	%	±	Expenditures
Social Credit	Dudley George Little	3,046	55.39%	–	
NDP	Ronald Douglas	1,742	31.68%		
Liberal	William Ivor Donald	711	12.93%		
Total Valid Votes		5,499	100.00%		
Total Rejected Ballots		56	%		
Turnout			%		

BC General Election 1963: Skeena
Party	Candidate	Votes	%	±	Expenditures
Social Credit	Dudley George Little	2,963	50.23%	–	
NDP	Richard Mouat Toynbee	1,975	33.48%		
Liberal	William Ivor Donald	961	16.29%		
Total Valid Votes		5,899	100.00%		
Total Rejected Ballots		65	%		
Turnout			%		

BC General Election 1960: Skeena
Party	Candidate	Votes	%	±	Expenditures
Social Credit	Dudley George Little	2,379	41.19%	–	
Co-operative Commonwealth Fed.	Monty Alton	2,137	37.00%		
Liberal	William Donald Stickney	848	14.68%		
Conservative	Guy Ronald Williams	411	7.12%		
Total Valid Votes		5,775	100.00%		
Total Rejected Ballots		109	%		
Turnout			%		

BC General Election 1956: Skeena
Party	Candidate	Votes	%	±	Expenditures
Social Credit	Hugh Addison Shirreff	1,886	37.01%	–	
Co-operative Commonwealth Fed.	Frank Howard	1,823	35.77%		
Liberal	Paul Wilbur Hallman	1,387	27.22%		
Total Valid Votes		5,096	100.00%		
Total Rejected Ballots		132	%		
Turnout			%		

Total

24th British Columbia election, 1953 ^{2}
Party	Candidate	Votes 1st count	%	Votes final count	%	±%
Co-operative Commonwealth Fed.	Frank Howard	1,768	37.04%	2,110	50.15%	
Liberal	Lionel Charles Houle	1,413	29.60%	2,097	49.85%	
Social Credit	Richard Stanley Lawrence	1,372	28.75%	-	%	
Progressive Conservative	William John O'Neill	220	4.61%	-	-%	
Total valid votes		4,773	100.00%	4,207	%	
Total rejected ballots		279				
Total Registered Voters		5,933 (1952 list)				
Turnout		70.15%				
Preferential ballot; final count is between top two candidates from first count; intermediary counts (of 3) not shown

1952 British Columbia general election
Party	Candidate	Votes 1st count	%	Votes final count	%
Liberal	Edward Tourtellotte Kenney	1,500	41.27	1,865	58.59
Co-operative Commonwealth	Frank Howard	1,048	28.83	1,318	41.41
Progressive Conservative	Herbert Wallace Leach	586	16.12	–	–
Social Credit	Kenneth Oroville McAmmond	501	13.78	–	–
Total valid votes		3,635	%	3,183	100.00
Total rejected ballots		147			
Note: Preferential ballot; final count is between top two candidates from first count; intermediary counts (of 3) not shown

BC General Election 1949: Skeena
Party	Candidate	Votes	%	±	Expenditures
Coalition	Edward Tourtellotte Kenney	2,048	73.20%	–	
Co-operative Commonwealth Fed.	Joseph Daney Denicola	750	26.80%		
Total Valid Votes		2,798	100.00%		
Total Rejected Ballots		91	%		
Turnout			%		

BC General Election 1945: Skeena
Party	Candidate	Votes	%	±	Expenditures
Coalition	Edward Tourtellotte Kenney	901	58.70%	–	
Co-operative Commonwealth Fed.	Floyd Forester Frank	634	41.30%		
Total Valid Votes		1,535	100.00%		
Total Rejected Ballots		47	%		
Turnout			%		

BC General Election 1941: Skeena
Party	Candidate	Votes	%	±	Expenditures
Liberal	Edward Tourtellotte Kenney	877	61.89%		
Progressive Conservative	William John O'Neill	540	38.11%		
Total Valid Votes		1,417	100.00%		
Total Rejected Ballots		61	%		
Turnout			%		

BC General Election 1937: Skeena
Party	Candidate	Votes	%	±	Expenditures
Liberal	Edward Tourtellotte Kenney	1,006	59.74%		
Co-operative Commonwealth Fed.	John Doney	678	40.26%		
Total Valid Votes		1,684	100.00%		
Total Rejected Ballots		68	%		
Turnout			%		

BC General Election 1933: Skeena
Party	Candidate	Votes	%	±	Expenditures
Liberal	Edward Tourtellotte Kenney	902	56.34%		
Co-operative Commonwealth Fed.	Joseph Edgar Panter	451	28.17%		
Independent	Ralph Carmichael Bamford	248	15.49%		
Total Valid Votes		1,601	100.00%		
Total Rejected Ballots		49	%		
Turnout			%		

BC General Election 1928: Skeena
Party	Candidate	Votes	%	±	Expenditures
Liberal	Horace Cooper Wrinch	910	54.33%		
Progressive Conservative	Frank Maurice Dockrill	765	45.67%		
Total Valid Votes		1,675	100.00%		
Total Rejected Ballots		36	%		
Turnout			%		

BC General Election 1924: Skeena
Party	Candidate	Votes	%	±	Expenditures
Liberal	Horace Cooper Wrinch	794	50.41%		
Provincial	Frank Maurice Dockrill	535	33.97%	–	
Conservative	Richard Strong Sargent	246	15.62%		
Total Valid Votes		1,575	100.00%		
Total Rejected Ballots			%		
Turnout			%		

== See also ==
- List of British Columbia provincial electoral districts
- Canadian provincial electoral districts
