= Prince George—Bulkley Valley =

Former federal electoral district in British Columbia, Canada

British Columbia electoral district

Defunct federal electoral district
- Legislature: House of Commons
- District created: 1976
- District abolished: 2003
- First contested: 1979
- Last contested: 2000

Prince George—Bulkley Valley was a federal electoral district in British Columbia, Canada, that was represented in the House of Commons of Canada from 1979 to 2004.

== Geography ==
This was a large, rural riding in northern BC.

== History ==
This electoral district was created in 1976 from parts of Prince George—Peace River, Skeena and Kamloops—Cariboo ridings.

This district was abolished in 2003. Parts of it went to Cariboo—Prince George, Skeena—Bulkley Valley, Prince George—Peace River and Kamloops–Thompson ridings.

== Members of Parliament ==
This riding elected the following members of Parliament:

Parliament	Years	Member	Party
Riding created from Prince George—Peace River, Skeena and Kamloops—Cariboo
31st	1979–1980	Lorne McCuish	Progressive Conservative
32nd	1980–1984	Lorne McCuish	Progressive Conservative
33rd	1984–1988	Lorne McCuish	Progressive Conservative
34th	1988–1993	Brian L. Gardiner	New Democratic
35th	1993–1997	Dick Harris	Reform
36th	1997–2000	Dick Harris	Reform
36th	2000–2000	Dick Harris	Alliance
37th	2000–2003	Dick Harris	Alliance
37th	2003–2004	Dick Harris	Conservative
Riding dissolved into Cariboo—Prince George, Skeena—Bulkley Valley, Prince George—Peace River and Kamloops—Thompson

== Election results ==
2000 Canadian federal election
Party	Candidate	Votes	%	±%	Expenditures
Alliance	Dick Harris	20,596	58.84	+4.55	$15,125
Liberal	Jeannette Townsend	8,202	23.43	+1.51	$23,510
Progressive Conservative	Oliver William Ray	2,448	6.99	–1.12	$3,639
New Democratic	Mark Walsh	2,029	5.80	–6.41	$3,616
Green	John Grogan	793	2.27	+0.69	$1,209
Canadian Action	Suzanne Woodrow	701	2.00	–	$5,911
Independent	John Van Der Woude	152	0.43	–0.54	$3,169
Marxist–Leninist	David MacKay	84	0.24	–	$17
Total valid votes		35,005	99.60		
Total rejected ballots		139	0.40	+0.03	
Turnout		35,144	59.28	+1.28	
Eligible voters		59,286			
Alliance hold		Swing		+1.52	
Source: Elections Canada

1997 Canadian federal election
Party	Candidate	Votes	%	±%	Expenditures
Reform	Dick Harris	17,505	54.28	+13.99	$41,733
Liberal	Eric Moore	7,070	21.92	–0.32	$36,251
New Democratic	Molly Eichar	3,935	12.20	–11.08	$11,185
Progressive Conservative	Bruce Strachan	2,615	8.11	–4.08	$24,359
Green	John Grogan	507	1.57	+1.02	$459
Independent	Thea Bove Zznoneoff	315	0.98	–	$751
Christian Heritage	John Van Der Woude	300	0.93	–0.03	$5,236
Total valid votes		32,247	99.63		
Total rejected ballots		119	0.37	–0.06	
Turnout		32,366	58.00	–6.71	
Eligible voters		55,808			
Reform hold		Swing		+7.16	
Source: Elections Canada

1993 Canadian federal election
Party	Candidate	Votes	%	±%
Reform	Dick Harris	14,757	40.29	+38.67
New Democratic	Brian Gardiner	8,526	23.28	–14.88
Liberal	David Stephen Wilbur	8,147	22.25	–2.61
Progressive Conservative	Colin J. Kinsley	4,463	12.19	–19.54
Christian Heritage	Bert Prins	351	0.96	–2.22
Green	Rick Zammuto	203	0.55	–
Natural Law	Alan Phillips	176	0.48	–
Total valid votes		36,623	99.57	
Total rejected ballots		159	0.43	+0.21
Turnout		36,782	64.71	–12.37
Eligible voters		56,842		
Reform gain from New Democratic		Swing		+26.78
Source: Elections Canada

1988 Canadian federal election
Party	Candidate	Votes	%	±%
New Democratic	Brian Gardiner	14,248	38.16	+3.54
Progressive Conservative	Valerie Kordyban	11,844	31.72	–17.57
Liberal	Bob Harkins	9,281	24.86	+11.50
Christian Heritage	Bert Prins	1,186	3.18	–
Reform	Svend Serup	605	1.62	–
Independent	Michael J. Karpes	171	0.46	–
Total valid votes		37,335	99.77	
Total rejected ballots		85	0.23	–0.10
Turnout		37,420	77.08	+4.53
Eligible voters		48,547		
New Democratic gain from Progressive Conservative		Swing		+10.56
Source: Elections Canada

1984 Canadian federal election
Party	Candidate	Votes	%	±%
Progressive Conservative	Robert Lorne McCuish	18,897	49.29	+9.81
New Democratic	Brian Gardiner	13,274	34.62	+2.68
Liberal	Noel Patrick O'Beirne	5,121	13.36	–15.22
Libertarian	Ron Good	478	1.25	–
Rhinoceros	Ben "The Newt" Van Drimmelen	401	1.05	–
Independent	James L. Swanson	168	0.44	–
Total valid votes		38,339	99.67	
Total rejected ballots		126	0.33	+0.01
Turnout		38,465	72.55	+8.09
Eligible voters		53,020		
Progressive Conservative hold		Swing		+3.56
Source: Elections Canada

1980 Canadian federal election
Party	Candidate	Votes	%	±%
Progressive Conservative	Robert Lorne McCuish	12,640	39.48	–3.13
New Democratic	Archie Patrick	10,226	31.94	+4.64
Liberal	Monica Marguerite Becott	9,147	28.57	+3.39
Total valid votes		32,013	99.68	
Total rejected ballots		102	0.32	+0.12
Turnout		32,115	64.46	–2.26
Eligible voters		49,823		
Progressive Conservative hold		Swing		–3.88
Source: Elections Canada

1979 Canadian federal election
Party	Candidate	Votes	%
Progressive Conservative	Robert Lorne McCuish	13,300	42.61
New Democratic	Archie Patrick	8,521	27.30
Liberal	Spike Enemark	7,862	25.19
Independent	William W. Kordyban	1,531	4.90
Total valid votes		31,214	99.80
Total rejected ballots		63	0.20
Turnout		31,277	66.72
Eligible voters		46,879	
This riding was created from parts of Prince George—Peace River, Skeena and Kamloops—Cariboo, which elected two Liberals and one Progressive Conservative (Prince George—Peace River) in the previous election.
Source: Elections Canada

== See also ==
- List of Canadian electoral districts
- Historical federal electoral districts of Canada
