= Iona Campagnolo =

Canadian politician

The Honourable Iona Campagnolo PC OC OBC
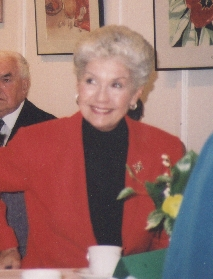
- Campagnolo in 2002

27th Lieutenant Governor of British Columbia
- In office September 25, 2001 – September 30, 2007
- Monarch: Elizabeth II
- Governors General: Adrienne Clarkson; Michaëlle Jean
- Premier: Gordon Campbell
- Preceded by: Garde Gardom
- Succeeded by: Steven Point

Member of Parliament for Skeena
- In office July 8, 1974 – May 22, 1979
- Preceded by: Frank Howard
- Succeeded by: James Fulton

Personal details
- Born: Iona Victoria Hardy; October 18, 1932 Galiano Island, British Columbia, Canada
- Died: April 4, 2024 (aged 91)
- Party: Liberal
- Spouse(s): Louis Campagnolo (m. 1952, div.)
- Children: 2 daughters
- Profession: radio broadcaster, politician

Iona Victoria Campagnolo PC OC OBC (née Hardy; October 18, 1932 – April 4, 2024) was a Canadian politician who served as the 27th Lieutenant Governor of British Columbia from 2001 to 2007; Campagnolo was the first woman to hold that office. Prior to becoming lieutenant governor, she was a Cabinet member in the Liberal government of Prime Minister Pierre Trudeau.

== Life and career ==
Born Iona Victoria Hardy on Galiano Island, she got her start in politics in 1966 when she was elected an alderwoman in the city council of Prince Rupert, British Columbia. In 1974, she turned to federal politics, running successfully as a Liberal Party candidate for the House of Commons of Canada in the riding of Skeena. In 1976, Prime Minister Pierre Trudeau appointed her to the Cabinet as Minister of Amateur Sport. Frank King, the Chairman of the Calgary Olympic Development Organization credited Campagnolo as the first person to share the vision of Calgary hosting the 1988 Winter Olympic Games, assisting the group in securing $200 million in federal funding for the organization's bid. She lost her seat to NDP challenger Jim Fulton in the 1979 election.

In 1982, she became president of the Liberal Party, a largely administrative position. During the 1984 convention which elected John Turner as party leader, Campagnolo created a minor furor within the party when she said that second-place leadership candidate Jean Chrétien was "second in the balloting, but first in our hearts".

When John Turner became Liberal leader in 1984, a television camera caught Turner patting Campagnolo's bottom. Although Campagnolo herself dismissed it (and patted Turner right back), the incident was used to paint Turner as being out of touch with contemporary women's issues.

Campagnolo ran in North Vancouver—Burnaby in the September 1984 election but was defeated in the Mulroney landslide that reduced Turner's Liberals to 40 seats. She did not run for re-election as party president at the next Liberal convention in 1986.

In 1973, Campagnolo was made a Member of the Order of Canada and promoted to Officer in 2008. In 1998, she received the Order of British Columbia.

In 1992, Campagnolo was elected as the founding chancellor of the University of Northern British Columbia and served in the position until 1998. She received an honorary degree from UNBC in 1999.

Campagnolo was the founding chair of the non-profit Fraser Basin Council, serving from 1997 to 2001.

In 2001, on the advice of Prime Minister Jean Chrétien, she was appointed by Governor General Adrienne Clarkson as British Columbia's first female Lieutenant Governor. At her swearing-in, Campagnolo concluded her remarks in Chinook, saying, "konoway tillicums klatawa kunamokst klaska mamook okoke huloima chee illahie" – meaning: "everyone was thrown together to make this strange new country (British Columbia)." As the Queen's viceroy in British Columbia, she was styled The Honourable for life. However, as she was already a Member of The Queen's Privy Council for Canada before she became lieutenant-governor, she was already styled The Honourable. She served in that position until September 30, 2007.

In 2003 the Chief Herald of Canada granted armorial bearings to Campagnolo.

Campagnolo died on April 4, 2024, at the age of 91.

== Personal life ==
Campagnolo married Louis in 1952 with whom she had two children. The couple were later divorced.

== Honours and awards ==

| Ribbon | Description | Notes |
| | Order of Canada (OC) | Officer 2008; Member 1973 |
| | Order of St. John | 2001; Dame of Justice |
| | Order of British Columbia (OBC) | 1998 |
| | Queen Elizabeth II Silver Jubilee Medal | 1977; Canadian version of this medal |
| | 125th Anniversary of the Confederation of Canada Medal | 1992 |
| | Queen Elizabeth II Golden Jubilee Medal | 2002; Canadian version of this medal |
| | Queen Elizabeth II Diamond Jubilee Medal | 2012; Canadian version of this medal |

=== Honorary degrees ===
Iona Campagnolo received many honorary degrees in recognition of her distinguished career in politics and her service as Lieutenant Governor of British Columbia; these included:

| Province | Date | School | Degree |
|---|---|---|---|
| British Columbia | June 8, 1995 | Simon Fraser University | Doctor of Laws (LL.D) |
| Ontario | June 11, 1997 | Brock University | Doctor of Laws (LL.D) |
| British Columbia | May 28, 1999 | University of Northern British Columbia | Doctorate |
| British Columbia | June 2007 | University of Victoria | Doctor of Laws (LL.D) |
| British Columbia | 2009 | University of British Columbia | Doctor of Laws (LL.D) |
| Ontario | 2009 | Trent University | Doctor of Laws (LL.D) |
| British Columbia | June 18, 2010 | Royal Roads University | Doctorate |

== Arms ==
Coat of arms of Iona Campagnolo
| Notes The arms of Iona Campagnolo consist of: Crest Issuant from a circlet Vert edged Or set with a frieze of dogwood flowers, a trumpeter swan (Cygnus buccinator) wings elevated Argent gorged with a scarf of the MacDonald tartan proper. Escutcheon Azure two pallets wavy, overall a double-arched bridge Argent masoned Azure. Supporters Dexter a female Kermode bear sinister a male Kermode bear (Ursus americanus Kermodie) both proper and gorged with a collar of red cedar Vert pendent therefrom a hurt, that to the dexter charged with an orca as styled by Tsimshian artist Roy Henry Vickers, that to the sinister charged with an eagle as styled by Haida artist Bill Reid Or. Compartment A grassy mound set with Blue Camas (Camassia quamash), nodding onion (Allium cernuum) and Garry oaks (Quercus garryana) proper above barry wavy Argent and Azure. Motto With Change is Peace |

Party political offices
| Preceded by Norman MacLeod | President of the Liberal Party of Canada; 1982–1986 | Succeeded by Michel Robert |
Order of precedence
| Preceded by Robert J. Bauman as Chief Justice of British Columbia | Order of precedence in British Columbia as of 2018 | Succeeded by Steven Point as 28th Lieutenant Governor of British Columbia |
