= Brian Gardiner (politician) =

Canadian politician

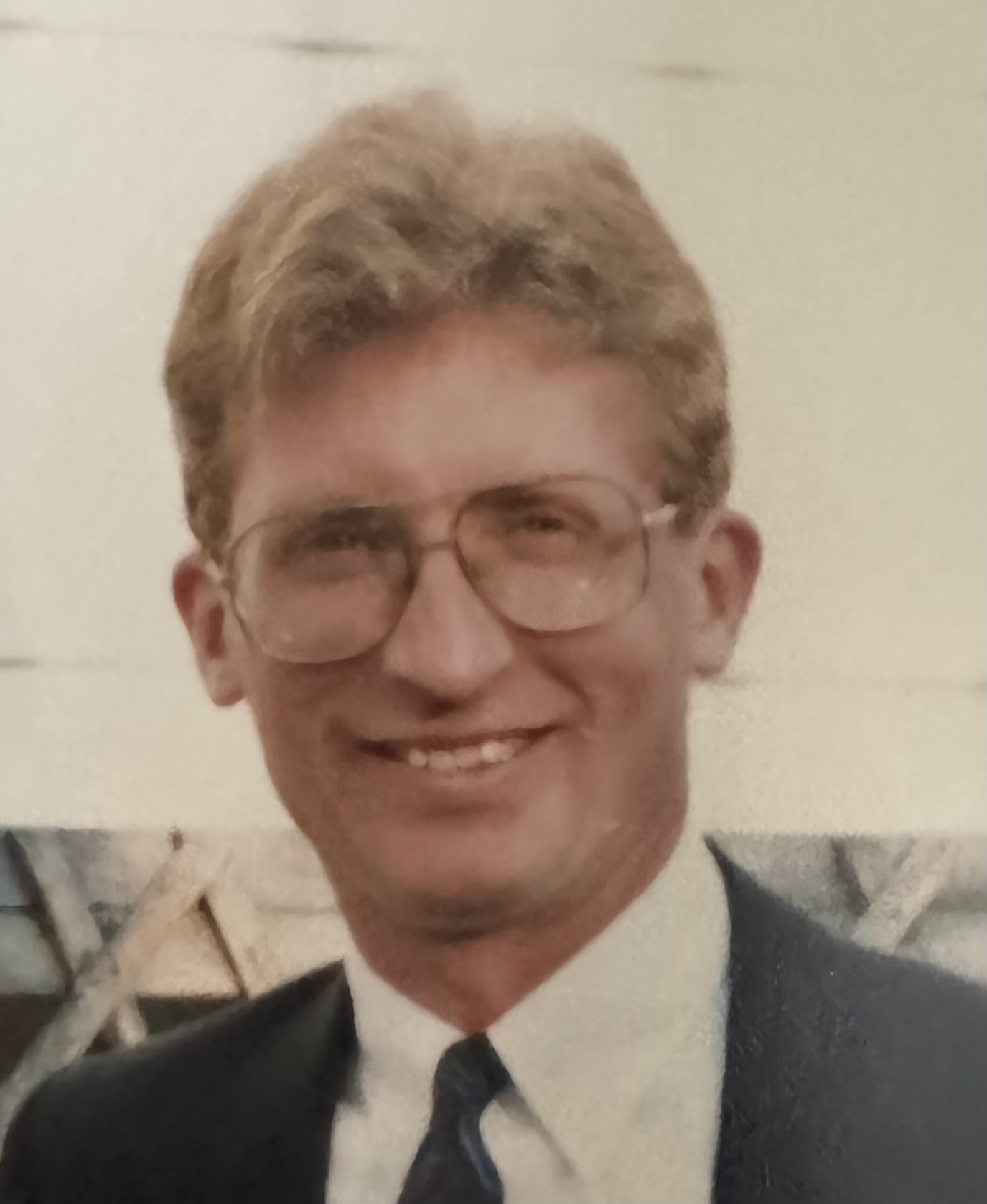

Brian L. Gardiner (born 18 August 1955) was a member of the House of Commons of Canada from 1988 to 1993. His background included publishing, administration and management.

Born in Prince Rupert, British Columbia, Gardiner first attempted to enter federal politics in the 1984 federal election when he became the New Democratic Party candidate for the Prince George—Bulkley Valley electoral district. He was unsuccessful that year, but did win the riding in the next federal election in 1988. He served in the 34th Canadian Parliament but lost to Dick Harris of the Reform Party in the 1993 federal election.

Following the 1993 federal election, Gardiner became Provincial Secretary of the BC NDP and later began working for the BC Government and Services Employees' Union.
