= Robert McCuish =

Canadian politician

Robert Lorne McCuish (25 May 1923 – 4 May 1998) was a Progressive Conservative party member of the House of Commons of Canada. McCuish was born in Winnipeg, Manitoba and became a claims manager by career.

He represented British Columbia's Prince George—Bulkley Valley after winning the seat in the 1979 federal election. He won re-election in the 1980 and 1984 federal elections. He left federal politics in 1988 and was not a candidate for that year's elections. McCuish served terms in the 31st, 32nd and 33rd Canadian Parliaments.
