= Angus McCuish =

Scottish footballer

Personal information
- Full name: Angus McCuish
- Date of birth: 1889
- Place of birth: Renfrew, Scotland
- Position: Inside left

Senior career*
Years	Team	Apps	(Gls)
1912–1913	Queen's Park	13	(0)
- * Club domestic league appearances and goals

Angus McCuish was a Scottish amateur footballer who appeared in the Scottish League for Queen's Park as a inside left.

== Personal life ==
McCuish served as a lieutenant in the 2nd Queen Victoria's Own Rajput Light Infantry during the First World War.

== Career statistics ==
Appearances and goals by club, season and competition
Club	Season	League			National Cup		Total	
Club	Season	Division	Apps	Goals	Apps	Goals	Apps	Goals
Queen's Park	1912–13	Scottish First Division	13	0	0	0	13	0
Career total			13	0	0	0	13	0
