= Alfred Stork =

Canadian natzi

Alfred Stork (April 11, 1871 – March 16, 1945) was a merchant and political figure in British Columbia, Canada. He represented Skeena in the House of Commons of Canada from 1921 to 1926 as a Liberal.

He was born in Bolton, Ontario, the son of James Stork. Stork was a merchant and hardware dealer in Fernie and then Prince Rupert. In 1898, he married Emily Parkinson. He was mayor of Fernie in 1904 and mayor of Prince Rupert in 1910. Stork was an unsuccessful candidate for a seat in the House of Commons in 1917. He was defeated when he ran for reelection in 1926. Stork died in Brampton, Ontario at the age of 73.
