= Hugh Shirreff =

Canadian politician

Hugh A. Shirreff

MLA for Skeena
- In office 1956–1960

Personal details
- Born: February 16, 1918 Veteran, Alberta
- Died: January 8, 1995 (aged 76) Vancouver, British Columbia
- Party: Social Credit

Hugh Addison Shirreff (February 16, 1918 – January 8, 1995) was a Canadian politician. He served in the Legislative Assembly of British Columbia from 1956 to 1960 from the electoral district of Skeena, a member of the Social Credit Party.
