= Tännäs =

Coordinates: 62°27′N 12°40′E

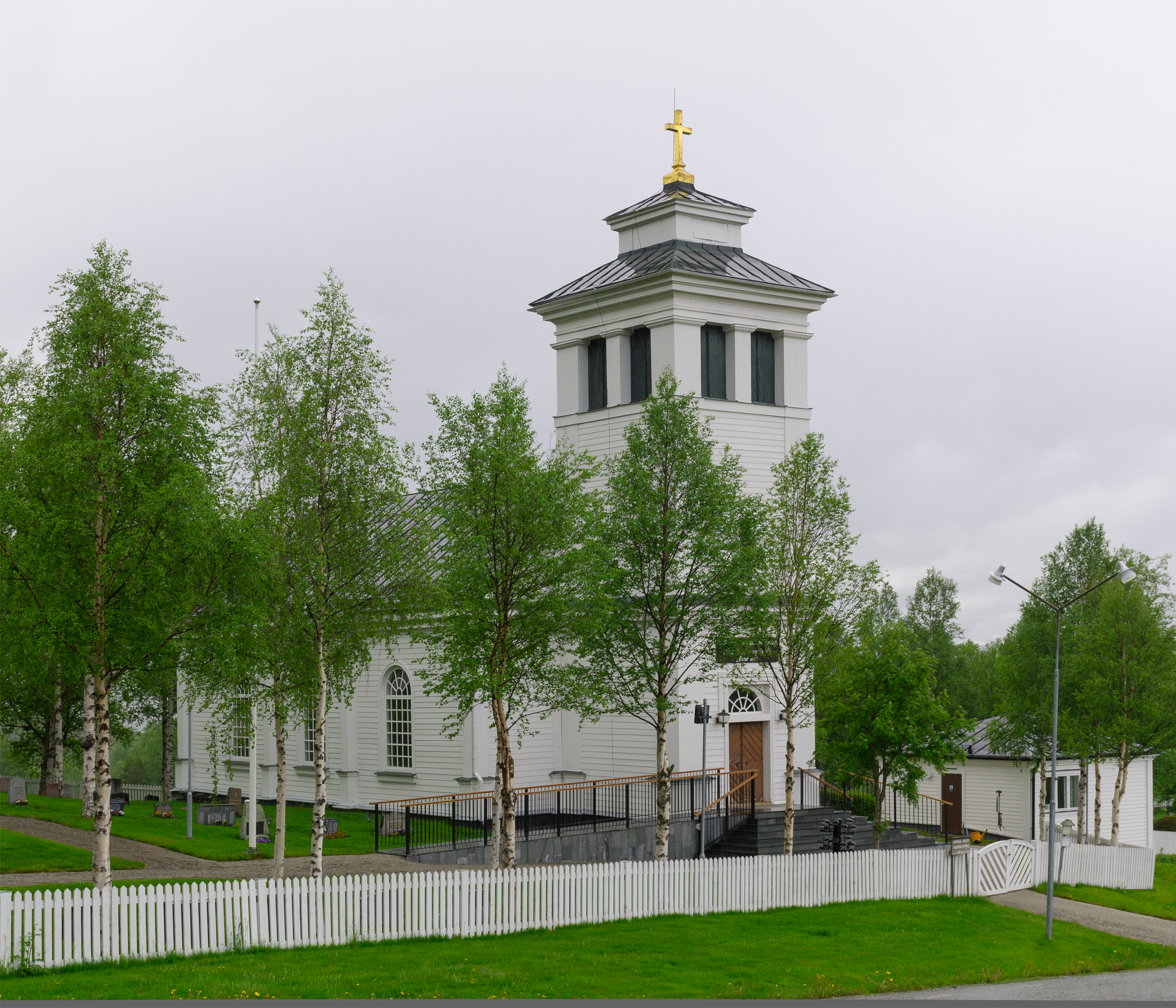
- Tännäs Church in June 2012

- Location within Jämtland Location within Sweden
- Country: Sweden
- Province: Jämtland
- County: Jämtland
- Municipality: Härjedalen

Population (31 December 2015)
  - Total: 140
  - Density: 1.48/km^{2} (3.8/sq mi)
- Time zone: UTC+1 (CET)
  - Summer (DST): UTC+2 (CEST)

Tännäs (Swedish pronunciation: [ˈtɛ̂nːɛs]) is a village and parish in Härjedalen, Sweden. In 2015, it had a population of 140.

Tännäs Church (Tännäs kyrka) was built between 1840 and 1851, underwent renovation in 1855 and was inaugurated on October 10, 1858. The drawings were made by architect Johan Adolf Hawerman (1812–1885) and construction was led by builder Johan Nordell. In 1984, a thorough renovation was carried out wherein the original colors were produced. These had been painted over 1958.
