= Olof Hanson (politician) =

Canadian politician

Member of Parliament for Skeena
- In office July 1930 – April 1945

Personal details
- Born: 3 June 1882 Tännäs, Sweden
- Died: 4 June 1952 (aged 70)
- Party: Liberal
- Profession: businessman, lumberman

Olof Hanson (3 June 1882 – 4 June 1952) was a Liberal party member of the House of Commons of Canada. He was born in Tännäs, Sweden and became a businessman and lumberman.

He was first elected to Parliament at the Skeena riding in the 1930 general election then re-elected in 1935 and 1940. After completing his third term, the 19th Canadian Parliament, Hanson did not seek re-election in 1945.
