= Mike Scott (politician) =

Canadian politician

Michael G. Scott (born April 18, 1954) was a Reform Party of Canada and later Canadian Alliance Member of Parliament in the House of Commons of Canada from 1993 to 2000. Scott represented the riding of Skeena, in northwestern British Columbia.

In the 2006 Canadian federal election, Scott attempted a political comeback when he ran for the Conservative Party in Skeena—Bulkley Valley, an expanded version of his former riding. He lost to New Democratic Party incumbent Nathan Cullen.
