= List of Canadian politicians who have crossed the floor =

This is a list of Canadian politicians who have crossed the floor, in that they have changed party affiliation while in office. These are members of Parliament (MPs) unless otherwise noted.

- MPPs are members of Provincial Parliament of Ontario
- MNAs are members of the National Assembly of Quebec
- MHAs are members of the House of Assembly of Newfoundland and Labrador
- MLAs are members of the Legislative Assembly of other provinces

== Pre-confederation ==
- 1866: Andrew Rainsford Wetmore, Anti-Confederate in the New Brunswick colonial legislature, joins the Confederation Party after failing to win a desired cabinet post.

== 1860s ==
- September 1, 1868: Stewart Campbell, formerly an Anti-Confederate MP, becomes a Liberal-Conservative member.
- January 30, 1869: The Anti-Confederate Party, which opposed Nova Scotia joining Confederation, collapses. Members scatter among different parties:
  - Conservative: Alfred William Savary
  - Liberal-Conservative: Archibald McLelan, James Charles McKeagney, Hugh McDonald, Edmund Mortimer McDonald, Joseph Howe, Thomas Coffin and Hugh Cameron
  - Liberal: James William Carmichael, William Henry Chipman, James Fraser Forbes, William Ross, William Hallett Ray, Patrick Power,
  - Independent: Alfred Gilpin Jones
- October 9, 1869: Richard John Cartwright, formerly a Liberal-Conservative MP, became a Liberal MP after being denied a position in the cabinet.

== 1870s ==
- 1873: Newton LeGayet MacKay leaves the Conservatives for the Liberals.
- 1874: Samuel McDonnell leaves the Conservatives for the Liberals.
- 1879: Five Quebec MLAs leave the Quebec Liberals for the Conservatives, causing the government to fall:
  - Alexandre Chauveau
  - Edmund James Flynn
  - Louis Napoléon Fortin
  - Étienne-Théodore Pâquet
  - Ernest Racicot

== 1880s ==
- 1887: Guillaume Amyot leaves the Conservative caucus to sit as a Nationalist. He later changes his designation to Nationalist Conservative.

== 1910s ==
- 1911: Louis-Joseph Papineau, Liberal MP since 1908, re-elected as a Conservative in 1911.

As a result of the Conscription Crisis of 1917, Conservative Prime Minister Sir Robert Borden forms a Union Government in an attempt to win support across party lines. Opposition leader Sir Wilfrid Laurier refuses to support the new government but many of his MPs cross the floor to support the new government either as Unionist or Liberal-Unionist candidates in the Canadian federal election of 1917. Those loyal to Laurier run as Laurier-Liberals. Conversely, a number of Quebec Conservative MPs abandon Borden over the conscription issue and join the Liberals.

- 1917: Louis-Joseph Papineau leaves the Conservatives to run as a Laurier-Liberal as a result of the Conscription Crisis.
- 1917: Robert Lorne Richardson, elected in the 1911 election as a Liberal (but previously sitting as variously a Liberal, Independent Liberal, Independent, and Independent Conservative) runs in the 1917 election as a Unionist.
- 1917: Honoré Achim crosses the floor from the Conservatives to the Liberals over the conscription issue. He does not run for re-election.
- 1917: William Andrew Charlton leaves the Liberal Party of Canada to run successfully as a Liberal-Unionist in the 1917 election over conscription.
- 1917: John Gillanders Turriff, who sat as a Liberal since 1891, runs successfully as a Unionist in the 1917 election.
- 1917: Alphonse Verville, Labour MP since 1906, runs and is re-elected as a Laurier-Liberal in 1917.
- 1917: Levi Thomson, a Liberal MP since 1904, re-elected as a Unionist in 1917.
- 1917: Frederick Forsyth Pardee, Liberal MP since 1905, re-elected as a Liberal-Unionist in 1917.
- 1917: Edward Walter Nesbitt, Liberal MP since 1908, re-elected as a Unionist in 1917.
- 1917: Hugh Havelock McLean, Liberal MP since 1908, re-elected as a Unionist in 1917.
- 1917: Thomas MacNutt, Liberal MP since 1908, re-elected as a Unionist in 1917.
- 1917: Alexander Kenneth Maclean, Liberal MP since 1900, re-elected as a Unionist in 1917.
- 1917: William Stewart Loggie, Liberal MP since 1904, re-elected as a Unionist in 1917.
- 1917: Hugh Guthrie, Liberal MP since 1900, re-elected as a Unionist in 1917.
- 1917: William Stevens Fielding, Liberal MP since 1896, re-elected as a Liberal-Unionist in 1917.
- 1917: James McCrie Douglas, Liberal since 1909, re-elected as a Unionist in 1917.
- 1917: Michael Clark, Liberal since 1908, re-elected as a Liberal-Unionist in 1917.
- 1917: Frank Broadstreet Carvell, Liberal MP since 1900, joins Borden's Cabinet as Minister of Public Works in October 1917 and runs as a Liberal-Unionist in the subsequent election.
- 1917: William Ashbury Buchanan, Liberal MP since 1911, re-elected as a Unionist in 1917.
- 1919: Andrew Knox, elected as a Liberal-Unionist in 1917, joins the Progressives in 1919.
- 1919: George William Andrews, elected as the Liberal-Unionist MP for Winnipeg Centre in 1917, becomes an independent on June 2, 1919, in protest of the government's handling of the Winnipeg General Strike.

== 1920s ==
- 1922: William James Hammell, Progressive MP for Muskoka, joins the Liberal Party.
- 1925: William George Baker, Saskatchewan Labour MLA, becomes a Labour-Liberal MLA and then later solely a Liberal Party of Saskatchewan MLA in 1938.
- 1929: Charles Agar, Saskatchewan Progressive MLA, joins Liberal Party of Saskatchewan.

== 1930s ==
- October 14, 1935: Henry Herbert Stevens, Minister of Trade and Commerce in the Conservative government of R.B. Bennett, leaves the party to form the Reconstruction Party of Canada, but then rejoined the Conservatives in 1938.

== 1950s ==
- 1950: Charles Edwin Greenlay, a Manitoba Progressive Conservative, crossed the floor to join Liberal-Progressive government of Douglas Lloyd Campbell. Leaving the party over his pro-coalition stance, Greenlay was made Provincial Secretary and Minister of Labour. Greenlay and Campbell were also childhood friends and related by marriage.
- 1952: Tilly Rolston, British Columbia Progressive Conservative MLA, crossed the floor to join the British Columbia Social Credit Party of W.A.C. Bennett.
- 1955: Ross Thatcher, Co-operative Commonwealth Federation (CCF) MP from Saskatchewan, leaves the party to sit as an independent. He runs as a Liberal in the 1957 election but is defeated. Subsequently, becomes leader of the Liberal Party of Saskatchewan and then Premier of Saskatchewan.
- 1955: Sam Drover leaves the Liberal Party of Newfoundland and Labrador to become the province's first MHA representing the CCF, losing his seat in the next year's election.

== 1960s ==
- 1962: Failed New Democratic Party (NDP) leadership contender and former CCF leader Hazen Argue crosses the floor to the Liberals.
- 1963: 13 Social Credit MPs form a new party called Ralliement des créditistes.
- 1964: Social Credit MPs, Gérard Ouellet and Gérard Girouard leave the Social Credit party to sit as Progressive Conservatives.
- 1967: Social Credit Party of Canada MP Bud Olson crosses the floor to the Liberals.
- 1967: René Lévesque, Quebec MLA for Montreal-Laurier, leaves the Quebec Liberal Party to sit as an independent. Lévesque later formed the Mouvement Souveraineté-Association and then the Parti Québécois, on whose ticket he was re-elected in 1976.
- 1968: Social Credit leader and MP Robert N. Thompson joins the Progressive Conservative Party.
- 1969: Liberal MP Perry Ryan (Spadina) quits the Liberal Party to sit as an independent because of the Trudeau government's policies on NATO and its decision to recognize the People's Republic of China. In 1970 Ryan joined the Progressive Conservatives, but lost his seat (coming 3rd) in the 1972 federal election.

== 1970s ==
- 1971: Paul Hellyer, left the Liberal caucus to sit as an independent Liberal on May 21, 1971 and subsequently attempted to form a new party, Action Canada. He joined the Progressive Conservatives on July 25, 1972, and sought its leadership in 1976. (In 1982, outside of Parliament and the political spotlight, he rejoined the Liberals, in 1995 formed the Canadian Action Party, and in the 2000s sought to merge it with the NDP.)
- 1972: Raymond Rock physically crossed the floor from the Liberals caucus to join the Progressive Conservatives on March 13, 1972.
- 1974: Hugh Curtis, BC Conservative MLA, crossed to Social Credit.
- 1975: Garde Gardom, Pat McGeer, and Allan Williams, all BC Liberal MLAs, crossed to Social Credit.
- 1975: Frank Calder, MLA for Atlin since 1949, crossed floor from NDP to Social Credit.
- 1977: Jack Horner left Progressive Conservatives to join Liberals, ultimately as part of Pierre Trudeau's cabinet. He was defeated as Liberal candidate in 1979. MP Jacques Lavoie representing the riding in Ontario, Hochelaga crossed In June 1977.
- 1977: Colin Thatcher, Saskatchewan MLA for Thunder Creek, defected from Liberals to the Conservatives.
- 1978: James Armstrong Richardson leaves the Liberals by physically crossing the floor to sit as an independent MP.

== 1980s ==
- 1980: Thomas Rideout, Liberal Party of Newfoundland and Labrador MHA, crosses the floor to join the Progressive Conservative Party of Newfoundland and Labrador over disputes with the federal government concerning control of offshore mineral resources.
- 1980: Dick Collver and Dennis Ham leave the Progressive Conservative Party of Saskatchewan to form the Unionest Party, which advocates for the western Provinces to join the United States. Neither sought re-election in 1982, resulting in the disappearance of the Unionest Party.
- 1982: Peter Ittinuar, MP, leaves New Democrats to join Liberals.
- 1985: Al Passarell, MLA for Atlin who defeated Frank Calder, crosses from NDP to Social Credit.
- 1985: Graham Lea, MLA for Prince Rupert, left the NDP after he was badly defeated in the NDP leadership race. He joined the recently formed but short-lived United Party of BC, so then joined the British Columbia Conservative Party becoming its last MLA until John van Dongen crossed from the BC Liberals in 2012.
- 1986: Gilles Roch, Manitoba Liberal Party MLA, defects to the Progressive Conservative Party of Manitoba after being denied permission to run as a Liberal candidate.
- 1986: David Ramsay, Ontario MPP, left Ontario New Democratic Party to join Ontario Liberal Party.
- 1986: Tony Lupusella, Ontario MPP, left Ontario New Democratic Party to join Ontario Liberal Party.
- 1986: Robert Toupin, MP, leaves the Progressive Conservatives, attempts to sit as a Liberal but is rejected, joining the NDP, before soon after leaving the NDP to sit as an independent.

== 1990s ==
- 1990: Lucien Bouchard, MP, quit the Progressive Conservatives to sit as an independent; with other MPs, he later formed the Bloc Québécois.
- 1990: David Kilgour, MP, quit the Progressive Conservatives to sit as an independent, then later joined Liberals. In 2005, Kilgour left the Liberal Party to again sit as an independent.
- 1990: Jean Lapierre, Liberal MP for Shefford, Quebec, leaves Liberal caucus to sit as a member of the Bloc Québécois. Lapierre would eventually return as a Liberal and was elected to the House of Commons in 2004.
- 1992: Richard Holden, Quebec MNA for Westmount, left the Equality Party to sit as an independent, finally joining Parti Québécois. This move was seen as unusual as the Equality Party, a federalist English-rights party, was the ideological opposite of the PQ.
- 1993: Dennis Drainville quit the Ontario New Democratic Party caucus to sit as an independent to protest the Rae government's decision to allow casino gambling in the province.
- 1993: Gordon Wilson and Judi Tyabji, British Columbia MLAs, left British Columbia Liberal Party to found the Progressive Democratic Alliance.
- 1993: Glen McPherson leaves the New Democratic Party of Saskatchewan and joins the Liberal Party of Saskatchewan.
- 1994: Jag Bhaduria leaves the Liberal caucus to sit as an independent. In 1996, he styled himself Liberal Democrat; while not a registered political party, this identification was recognized in Hansard. In 1997, he re-ran for his seat as an independent and was defeated.
- 1995: Richard Neufeld, Lyall Hanson, Len Fox and Jack Weisgerber, MLAs, left Social Credit to join Reform Party of British Columbia.
- 1996: John Nunziata, expelled from the Liberal caucus as a result of voting against the 1996 budget in protest, claiming a broken promise on the elimination of the Goods and Services Tax. He was re-elected as an independent in 1997.
- 1997: Richard Neufeld, MLA, left Reform Party of British Columbia for the British Columbia Liberal Party.
- 1997: Gordon Wilson, after being re-elected as a Progressive Democrat, left the Progressive Democratic Alliance to join the British Columbia New Democratic Party and was appoint to Glen Clark's cabinet.
- 1997: Bob Bjornerud, June Draude, Ken Krawetz, and Rod Gantefoer leave the Liberal Party of Saskatchewan to help form the Saskatchewan Party.
- 1997: Bill Boyd, Don Toth, Ben Heppner and Dan D'Autremont leave the Progressive Conservative Party of Saskatchewan to help form the Saskatchewan Party.
- 1997: Jack Gooshen leaves the Progressive Conservative Party of Saskatchewan to sit as an independent.
- 1997: Arlene Julé leaves the Liberal Party of Saskatchewan to sit as an independent.
- 1998: Alex Cullen, Ontario MPP, left the Ontario Liberal Party to sit as an independent, then joined the Ontario New Democratic Party eight days later.
- 1998: Buckley Belanger, Saskatchewan MLA, resigned as Liberal Party of Saskatchewan MLA to run for the Saskatchewan New Democratic Party. He won re-election as a New Democrat with the second highest percentage of vote in Saskatchewan history.
- 1997: Arlene Julé joins the Saskatchewan Party and is no longer an independent.
- 1999: Angela Vautour leaves the New Democratic caucus for the Progressive Conservative caucus.
- 1999: Anna-Marie Castrilli, Ontario MPP, left the Ontario Liberal Party to join the Progressive Conservative Party of Ontario after losing the Liberal nomination in York Centre to Monte Kwinter (a reduction in ridings had forced the two MPPs to compete for the nomination). However, rather than running in York Centre, Castrilli runs in the 1999 provincial election in Parkdale—High Park against Liberal MPP Gerard Kennedy and is defeated.

== 2000s ==
- April 2000: André Harvey, MP, left Progressive Conservatives to sit as an independent.
- September 12, 2000: David Price, MP, and Diane St-Jacques, MP, left the Progressive Conservatives to join Liberals; André Harvey, former PC MP but independent since April, also joined the Liberals at the same announcement. St-Jacques and Price reportedly told PC leader Joe Clark months earlier that they would leave the party.
- September 27, 2000: Rick Laliberte, NDP MP, sits as a Liberal and later switched to independent for the 2004 election.
- 2001: Jean-Guy Carignan, Liberal MP, changes to Independent-Liberal then back to Liberal, then finally to sit as independent.
- 2001: Jim Melenchuk and Ron Osika leave the Liberal Party of Saskatchewan when the party leaves the coalition with NDP. Both decide to continue to support the government and stay in cabinet. In the 2003 election both run for the New Democratic Party of Saskatchewan and are defeated.
- 2001: MPs Art Hanger, Chuck Strahl, Gary Lunn, Jim Pankiw, Val Meredith, Grant McNally, Jay Hill, Jim Gouk, Monte Solberg, Andy Burton, Brian Fitzpatrick, Deborah Grey, and Inky Mark were either expelled from or voluntarily left the Canadian Alliance caucus after publicly criticizing party leader Stockwell Day, and sat as an "Independent Alliance Caucus". Hanger, Gouk, Solberg, Fitzpatrick and Burton returned to the Alliance at the end of the summer; the remaining MPs continued to sit as the Democratic Representative Caucus. All but Mark and Pankiw eventually rejoined the Alliance by 2002.
- 2002: Inky Mark, Democratic Representative Caucus MP, changes to independent, then later to the Progressive Conservatives.
- 2002: Jim Pankiw, Democratic Representative Caucus MP, was denied permission to rejoin the Canadian Alliance and sat the remainder of his term as an independent MP.
- May 2002: Dennis Fentie, MLA for the Yukon New Democratic Party, leaves the party to join the Yukon Party.
- 2002: Joe Peschisolido, changes from Canadian Alliance MP to Liberal.
- 2002: Ghislain Lebel, changes from Bloc Québécois MP to independent.
- 2003: Pierre Brien, changes from Bloc Québécois MP to independent.
- December 11, 2003: Scott Brison, Progressive Conservative MP, joins Liberals on the former's merger into the Conservative Party. Also Robert Lanctôt, Bloc Québécois MP, joins Liberals.
- February 17, 2004: John Bryden, Liberal MP, sits as an independent.
- February 25, 2004: John Bryden, independent MP, sits with the new Conservative Party. He subsequently lost the Conservative nomination in his riding held shortly after his switch.
- January 14, 2004: Keith Martin, Canadian Alliance MP, sits as an independent and announces he intends to seek the Liberal Party's nomination for his riding to protest the former's merger into the Conservative Party. He subsequently won the nomination, won the election and sat in the Liberal caucus until his retirement in 2011.
- June 8, 2004: Anne Cools, appointed to the Senate as a Liberal, announces that she will be crossing the floor to sit as a Conservative.
- June 29, 2004: Gary Masyk, Alberta MLA, crosses the floor from the Alberta Progressive Conservative Party to the Alberta Alliance Party.
- November 22, 2004: Carolyn Parrish, Liberal MP, was suspended from the caucus on November 18 after public comments about the Liberal Party and Prime Minister Paul Martin. She decided to sit as an independent member four days later.
- 2005: David Kilgour, MP, changes from Liberals to independent.
- May 17, 2005: Belinda Stronach, MP, leaves Conservative Party to join Paul Martin's Liberal cabinet.
- June 6, 2005: Pat O'Brien, leaves Liberals to sit as an independent MP.
- October 17, 2005: Bev Desjarlais, NDP, sits as an independent MP after losing her party's nomination for an upcoming election
- January 13, 2006: Frank Branch, dean of the New Brunswick legislature and MLA for Nepisiguit, switches his affiliation from Liberal to independent pending a police investigation into his business practices.
- February 6, 2006: David Emerson, MP, changes from Liberals to Conservatives and joined Stephen Harper's cabinet two weeks after the election.
- February 21, 2006: Michael Malley, New Brunswick MLA for Miramichi-Bay du Vin, changes from Progressive Conservative to independent, after being turned down for a New Brunswick cabinet position and other demands. This move changed the balance of power from a majority government to a minority government in the New Brunswick Legislative Assembly.
- April 13, 2006: Michael Malley switches from independent back to Progressive Conservative while serving as speaker. This is seen as setting a precedent.
- January 5, 2007: Wajid Khan, MP, leaves the Liberals and joins the Conservatives.
- March 29, 2007: Tim Peterson, MPP in Ontario, leaves the Liberals to sit as an independent. On June 6, 2007, Peterson joins the Progressive Conservatives.
- April 17, 2007: Joan MacAlpine-Stiles and Wally Stiles, spouses and MLAs in the New Brunswick legislature, leave the Progressive Conservative Party of New Brunswick and join the governing New Brunswick Liberal Association.
- August 30, 2008: Blair Wilson, independent MP who resigned from the Liberal caucus due to allegations of financial impropriety, joins the Green Party of Canada becoming its first ever Member of Parliament.
- October 23, 2008: André Riedl and Pierre-Michel Auger, Quebec MNAs, cross the floor from the ADQ to the governing Liberals.
- November 6, 2009: Quebec MNAs Éric Caire and Marc Picard leave the ADQ to sit as independents. In 2011, they join the Coalition Avenir Québec.

== 2010s ==
- January 4, 2010: Rob Anderson and Heather Forsyth leave the Progressive Conservative Association of Alberta to join the Wildrose Party in Alberta. Anderson crossed back in 2014.
- June 11, 2010: British Columbia MLA Blair Lekstrom left the BC Liberal Party to sit as an independent, in opposition to the party's handling of the Harmonized Sales Tax. He rejoined the party in early 2011, after the election of Christy Clark in the party's 2011 leadership election.
- June 24, 2010: Guy Boutilier joins the Wildrose Party almost a year after being ejected from the Alberta Progressive Conservative caucus.
- June 10, 2011: Nova Scotia PC MLA Karen Casey quit the PC Caucus to join Stephen McNeil's opposition Nova Scotia Liberal Party."Tory MLA Casey crosses floor". CBC News. January 10, 2011.
- June 6, 2011: Quebec MNAs Louise Beaudoin, Pierre Curzi and Lisette Lapointe leave the Parti Québécois to sit as independents, citing dissatisfaction with the leadership of Pauline Marois. They are followed on June 7 by Jean-Martin Aussant, on June 20 by Benoit Charette, and on June 21 by René Gauvreau. Aussant later founds the Option nationale party and Charette joins the Coalition Avenir Québec caucus. Beaudoin rejoins the PQ on April 3, 2012.
- November 21, 2011: Alberta MLA Bridget Pastoor leaves the Alberta Liberal Party and crosses the floor to the Progressive Conservatives under Alison Redford.
- January 9, 2012: François Rebello, MNA, leaves the Parti Québécois caucus and joins the Coalition Avenir Québec.
- January 10, 2012: Lise St-Denis, MP, leaves the New Democratic Party to join the Liberals.
- March 26, 2012: John van Dongen, BC MLA, leaves the BC Liberal Party and joins the BC Conservative Party
- April 23, 2012: Bruce Hyer, MP, leaves the New Democratic Party caucus to sit as an independent. He subsequently joins the Green Party in December 2013.
- September 2012: Tom Osborne, MHA, leaves the Progressive Conservative Party of Newfoundland and Labrador to join the Liberal Party of Newfoundland and Labrador.
- February 2013: Kelly Lamrock, MLA and lawyer, leaves the New Brunswick Liberal Association to join the New Brunswick New Democratic Party.
- February 28, 2013: Claude Patry, MP, leaves the New Democratic Party caucus to join the Bloc Québécois.
- June 5, 2013: Brent Rathgeber, MP, leaves the Conservative Party caucus to sit as an independent.
- September 26, 2013: Dean Del Mastro, MP, leaves the Conservative Party caucus to sit as an independent.
- October 3, 2013: Hal Perry, MLA, leaves the Progressive Conservative Party of Prince Edward Island and joins the Prince Edward Island Liberal Party.
- October 29, 2013: Christopher Mitchelmore and Dale Kirby leave the Newfoundland and Labrador New Democratic Party in protest against the leadership of Lorraine Michael. Both sat as "Independent NDP" MHAs before joining the Liberal Party of Newfoundland and Labrador.
- December 18, 2013: Maria Mourani, MP, announces she is leaving the Bloc Québécois and renounces sovereigntism, and sits as an independent. In 2014, she announces she will stand in the next election for the New Democratic Party, but remains an independent MP due to that party's policy against floor-crossing.
- January 20, 2014: Paul Lane, MHA, leaves the Progressive Conservative Party of Newfoundland and Labrador to join the Liberal Party of Newfoundland and Labrador.
- August 12, 2014: Jean-François Fortin, MP, leaves the Bloc Québécois to sit as an independent. He helped form Strength in Democracy in October 2014.
- August 20, 2014: Sana Hassainia, MP, leaves the New Democratic Party to sit as an independent in a dispute with NDP leader Thomas Mulcair's position on the Israeli–Palestinian conflict.
- August 25, 2014: André Bellavance, MP, leaves the Bloc Québécois to sit as an independent.
- October 21, 2014: Jean-François Larose, MP, leaves the New Democratic Party to help form Strength in Democracy.
- November 24, 2014: Kerry Towle, MLA, and Ian Donovan, MLA, leave the Wildrose Party to join the Progressive Conservative Association of Alberta.
- December 17, 2014: Danielle Smith, MLA and leader of the Wildrose Party, along with eight other Wildrose MLAs—Rob Anderson, Gary Bikman, Rod Fox, Jason Hale, Bruce McAllister, Blake Pedersen, Bruce Rowe and Jeff Wilson—leave the Wildrose Party to join the Progressive Conservative Association of Alberta.
- February 9, 2015: Eve Adams, MP for Mississauga—Brampton South, leaves the Conservative Party and joins the Liberals.
- November 17, 2016: Sandra Jansen, MLA for Calgary-North West, leaves the Progressive Conservative Association of Alberta and joins the Alberta New Democratic Party.
- May 28, 2017: Jack MacLaren, MPP, joins the Trillium Party of Ontario, shortly after being expelled from the Progressive Conservative Party of Ontario caucus over comments he had made about Francophones in Ontario. Since the Trillium Party lacked official party status, MacLaren was officially considered an independent by the legislature.
- February 28, 2018: Seven Bloc Québécois MPs—Michel Boudrias, Rhéal Fortin, Simon Marcil, Monique Pauzé, Louis Plamondon, Gabriel Ste-Marie, and Luc Thériault—leave the party to sit as independents. Boudrias and Marcil rejoin the party on June 6 following Martine Ouellet's defeat in a leadership review referendum. Fortin, Pauzé, Plamondon, Ste-Marie, and Thériault go on to form Québec debout.
- August 23, 2018: Maxime Bernier, MP, leaves the Conservative Party and goes on to form the People's Party of Canada.
- September 17, 2018: Leona Alleslev, MP, leaves the Liberal Party to join the Conservative Party.
- September 17, 2018: The five remaining MPs of Québec debout, Rhéal Fortin, Monique Pauzé, Louis Plamondon, Gabriel Ste-Marie, and Luc Thériault rejoin the Bloc Québécois.
- March 11, 2019: Catherine Fournier, MNA, leaves the Parti Québécois to sit as an independent, citing the party's lack of commitment to the sovereignist ideology.

== 2020s ==
- January 16, 2020: Amanda Simard, MPP for Glengarry—Prescott—Russell, having previously resigned from the Ontario PC caucus in September 2018 due to the government's Franco-Ontarian policies, joins the Ontario Liberal Party.
- June 10, 2021: Jenica Atwin, MP for Fredericton, leaves the Green Party to join the Liberal Party.
- June 18, 2021: Claire Samson, MNA for Iberville, having previously been removed from the Coalition Avenir Québec caucus that same month, joins the Conservative Party of Quebec as its first ever MNA.
- March 7, 2022: Lela Evans, MHA for Torngat Mountains, having previously resigned from the Progressive Conservative Party of Newfoundland and Labrador, joins the Newfoundland and Labrador New Democratic Party.
- September 13, 2023: Bruce Banman, MLA for Abbotsford South leaves BC United to join the Conservative Party of British Columbia.
- February 22, 2024: Brendan Maguire, MLA for Halifax Atlantic, leaves the Liberal Party for the Progressive Conservative Association, and becomes Minister for Community Services.
- May 31, 2024: Lorne Doerkson, MLA for Cariboo-Chilcotin, leaves BC United to join the Conservative Party of British Columbia.
- June 3, 2024: Elenore Sturko, MLA for Surrey South, leaves BC United to join the Conservative Party of British Columbia.
- July 16, 2024: Lela Evans, MHA for Torngat Mountains, returns to the Progressive Conservative Party of Newfoundland and Labrador after spending two years with the Newfoundland and Labrador New Democratic Party.
- July 29, 2024: Teresa Wat, MLA for Richmond North Centre, leaves BC United to join the Conservative Party of British Columbia.
- September 3, 2024: Trevor Halford, MLA for Surrey-White Rock, Peter Milobar, MLA for Kamloops-North Thompson, and Ian Paton, MLA for Delta South leave BC United to join the Conservative Party of British Columbia.
- October 22, 2024: Fred Tilley, MHA for Northside-Westmount, leaves the Liberal Party to join the Progressive Conservative Association.
- June 9, 2025: Dallas Brodie, MLA for Vancouver-Quilchena, and Tara Armstrong, MLA for Kelowna-Lake Country-Coldstream, having previously been ejected from the Conservative Party of British Columbia caucus in March 2025, form and join OneBC.
- July 17, 2025: Councillor Craig Sauvé, having left Projet Montréal due to sexual assault allegations, joins Transition Montréal.
- November 4, 2025: Chris d'Entremont, MP for Acadie-Annapolis, leaves the Conservative Party to join the Liberal Party.
- December 11, 2025: Michael Ma, MP for Markham-Unionville, leaves the Conservative Party to join the Liberal Party.
- February 18, 2026: Matt Jeneroux, MP for Edmonton-Riverbend, leaves the Conservative Party to join the Liberal Party.
- March 10, 2026: Lori Idlout, MP for Nunavut, leaves the New Democratic Party to join the Liberal Party.
- March 24, 2026: Maïté Blanchette Vézina, MNA for Rimouski, having previously resigned from the Coalition Avenir Québec caucus, joins the Conservative Party of Quebec.
- April 8, 2026: Marilyn Gladu, MP for Sarnia—Lambton—Bkejwanong, leaves the Conservative Party to join the Liberal Party.
- May 11, 2026: Becky Druhan, MLA for Lunenburg West, having previously resigned from the Progressive Conservative Association of Nova Scotia caucus, joins the Nova Scotia Liberal Party.
- July 3, 2026: Amelia Boultbee, MLA for Penticton-Summerland, having previously resigned from the Conservative Party of British Columbia caucus, joins the British Columbia New Democratic Party.

== Other changes ==
The following list contains items that, while not generally considered crossing the floor, may be similar in nature.

- In 1979, Pauline Jewett, who had been a Liberal MP from 1963 to 1965, returns to Parliament as a New Democrat.
- In 1997, David MacDonald, who had been a Progressive Conservative MP from 1965 to 1980 and 1988 to 1993, was a candidate to re-enter Parliament as a New Democrat, but was not elected.
- February 2, 2004: André Bachand, Joe Clark, and John Herron remain Progressive Conservative MPs (and are officially designated as independent Progressive Conservatives) when the Progressive Conservative Party merges with the Canadian Alliance to form the Conservative Party of Canada. Herron runs as a Liberal candidate in the 2004 election but is unsuccessful.
- In 2004, Canadian Alliance MP Chuck Cadman lost his party renomination race, but ran for re-election as an independent and won. The election resulted in a minority Liberal government, and Cadman's controversial vote to support a 2005 Liberal budget amendment, a confidence vote, was decisive in sustaining the Liberal government.
- In 2004, former NDP MP Chris Axworthy, who had resigned from Parliament in 1999, attempts to return to the House of Commons as a Liberal but is unsuccessful. He suffers a second defeat in 2006.
- Former British Columbia NDP Premier Ujjal Dosanjh was elected as a Liberal MP in the 2004 federal election.
- Former provincial cabinet minister and former Quebec Liberal MNA Lawrence Cannon was elected as a Conservative MP in the 2006 federal election and subsequently became Minister of Transport, Infrastructure, and Communities and later Minister of Foreign Affairs.
- Former Ontario NDP Premier and MP Bob Rae announced his candidacy for the leadership of the federal Liberals in 2006, and was re-elected to Parliament as a Liberal in 2008. He served as interim Liberal leader between 2011 and 2013.
- Françoise Boivin, a former Liberal MP who was defeated in the 2006 election, left the Liberal Party in 2008 and ran as a candidate for the New Democratic Party in the 2008 election. She was subsequently elected as a New Democrat in 2011.
- Cris Aglugub, who had been New Democratic Party of Manitoba MLA for The Maples from 1999 to 2007, was the 2011 Progressive Conservative Party of Manitoba candidate in the newly created riding of Tyndall Park, where he placed third.
- Jean Charest, the former Premier of Quebec from 2003–2012 and leader of the Quebec Liberal Party from 1998–2012 was also the leader of the federal Progressive Conservative Party from 1995–1998 and a Progressive Conservative MP prior to that.
- Thomas Mulcair, the leader of the New Democratic Party 2012–2017 was a Member of the National Assembly of Quebec for the Quebec Liberal Party from 1994–2007, when he announced he would not run in that year's provincial election. Later that year, he stood as the NDP candidate in a federal by-election.
- Glenn Thibeault, NDP MP Sudbury, resigned his seat in order to be appointed the Ontario Liberal Party's candidate in a 2015 provincial by-election. He was briefly re-designated as an independent MP before his resignation became official.
- On January 1, 2017, Dominic Cardy resigned both as leader of the New Brunswick New Democratic Party and as a member of the provincial and federal New Democratic Parties. Cardy had not been elected to a public office as a New Democrat. On January 27 he accepted a position with the Progressive Conservative Party of New Brunswick, initially as strategic issues director and in April as chief of staff to party caucus. In the 2018 provincial election he was elected PC MLA for Fredericton West-Hanwell, which he had previously contested unsuccessfully as a New Democrat. He entered the provincial PC cabinet.
- In 2019, Lenore Zann, MLA for Truro-Bible Hill-Millbrook-Salmon River, left the Nova Scotia NDP to run as a federal Liberal Party candidate in the federal election; she served as an independent MLA until she formally resigned her seat.
- In 2021, Belinda Karahalios, MPP, having previously been removed from the Ontario PC caucus after voting against Bill 195, co-founded the New Blue Party of Ontario, alongside her husband Jim Karahalios.
- In 2021, Rick Nicholls, MPP for Chatham-Kent—Leamington after previously being ejected from the Ontario PC caucus after refusing to get a COVID-19 vaccine against party policy, joined the Ontario Party.
- In 2022, Dominic Cardy resigned as the Minister of Education and Early Childhood Development under the Progressive Conservative Party of New Brunswick and became independent. In 2023, he co-founded and became first leader of the federal Canadian Future Party.
- In 2023, John Rustad, MLA for Nechako Lakes, having previously been removed from the BC Liberal caucus for tweets suggesting that carbon dioxide emissions were not contributing to climate change, joined the BC Conservative party.
- In 2025, Gregor Robertson was elected as a Liberal member of Parliament for Vancouver Fraserview—South Burnaby, after previously serving as a New Democratic member of the Legislative Assembly of British Columbia for Vancouver-Fairview from 2005 to 2008.
- In 2026, Doly Begum, MPP for Scarborough Southwest, left the Ontario NDP to run as the federal Liberal Party candidate in the 2026 Scarborough Southwest federal by-election.

== See also ==
- List of Canadian politicians who have switched parties
