= Frank Harry Mobley =

Canadian politician

Member of the Legislative Assembly of British Columbia
- In office 1916–1920
- Preceded by: Henry Esson Young
- Succeeded by: Herbert Frederick Kergin
- Constituency: Atlin

Personal details
- Born: May 14, 1870 Colorado Territory, United States
- Died: February 3, 1920 (aged 49) Victoria, British Columbia
- Party: British Columbia Liberal Party
- Spouse: Ida Josephine Calvin
- Relatives: Eric Veach (grandnephew)
- Occupation: Wholesale grocer

Francis Harry Mobley (May 14, 1870 – February 3, 1920) was a political figure in British Columbia. He represented Atlin from 1916 to 1920 in the Legislative Assembly of British Columbia as a Liberal.

He died in office of influenza at the age of 49 at the Empress Hotel in Victoria in 1920.
