= List of Canadian politicians who have switched parties =

This is a list of Canadian politicians who have switched parties while in office or out.

- MPs are Members of Parliament of Canada
- MPPs are Members of Provincial Parliament of Ontario
- MNAs are Members of the National Assembly of Quebec
- MHAs are Members of the House of Assembly of Newfoundland and Labrador
- MLAs are Members of the Legislative Assembly of other provinces

== Conservative Party ==
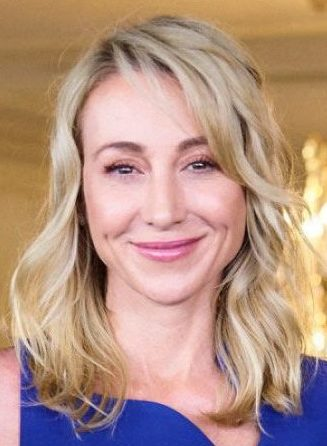
Belinda Stronach made a controversial move in 2005 from the Conservatives to the Liberals

This list includes members of the Progressive Conservative Party and its predecessor parties, the Canadian Alliance and the modern Conservative Party. This list also includes members of provincial and territorial conservative parties and all other conservative-minded parties in Canada, including the Coalition Avenir Québec.

=== Conservative to Liberal ===
- Eve Adams – Conservative MP for Mississauga—Brampton South joined the Liberals on February 9, 2015, after conflicts over her attempts to be nominated as a Conservative left her without a riding to stand in for the next federal election.
- Dominique Anglade – former CAQ party president and later leader of the Quebec Liberal Party.
- Pierre-Michel Auger – elected as Action démocratique du Québec MNA, crossed over to Quebec Liberal Party in 2008.
- Leo Barry – Newfoundland Progressive Conservative MHA in the 1970s and 1980s, Energy Minister under Frank Moores and Brian Peckford, crossed the floor to join the Newfoundland Liberal Party in 1984, served as Liberal leader from 1985 until 1987.
- Ken Boshcoff – Liberal MP for the riding of Thunder Bay-Rainy River from 2004 to 2008, stood as a PC candidate in the 1984 and 1988 general elections.
- Lise Bourgault – PC MP in the 1980s ran for the Liberals in the 2000 election.
- Scott Brison – First openly gay Progressive Conservative MP, Kings Hants 1997–1998, (gave up seat for then-leader Joe Clark to run), 2000–2003. He ran for the PC leadership in June 2003, coming in 3rd. He quit the new Conservatives in late 2003 over their socially conservative wing agenda, saying "...while they figure out ways to privatize the sidewalk."
- Gary Carr – Ontario PC MPP Oakville 1995–2003 / Liberal MP Halton 2004–2006; This former NHL hockey player and former Speaker of the House for the Ontario Legislature publicly rebuffed and quit the Tories over the lack of integrity and waste caused by the Harris/Eves governments.
- Jean Charest – Federal Progressive Conservative leader 1994–1998, left the federal PC for the Liberal Party of Quebec then became Premier of Quebec under that banner (2003–2012)
- Chris d'Entremont – Conservative MP for Acadie—Annapolis joined the Liberals on November 4, 2025, in support of Mark Carney's government.
- Pierre Dufour – former CAQ MNA who later ran for the Quebec Liberals.
- Becky Druhan – MLA for Lunenburg West joined the Nova Scotia Liberal Party after having previously resigned from the Progressive Conservative Association of Nova Scotia caucus.
- Ron Evans – Grand Chief of the Assembly of Manitoba Chiefs, ran for the Manitoba PCs in 1999, later switched to the Liberals in 2000, ran as the Liberal candidate for Churchill in 2004.
- Marilyn Gladu – Conservative MP for Sarnia—Lambton—Bkejwanong joined the Liberals on April 8, 2026, to support the Carney government.
- John Herron – PC MP for New Brunswick, quit the newly merged Conservatives, to run for the Liberals and subsequently lost to the Conservative candidate.
- Jack Horner – PC MP, switched to Liberals in 1977.
- Matt Jeneroux – Conservative MP for Edmonton Riverbend, joined the Liberals on February 18, 2026, to support Mark Carney's government.
- David Kilgour – former PC MP from Alberta, switched to the Liberals in the early 1990s over the Brian Mulroney government introducing the GST.
- Paul Lane – PC MHA who joined the Newfoundland and Labrador Liberals in 2014. Later became an independent.
- Ricardo Lopez – former PC MP and Canadian Alliance candidate, nominated for the federal Liberals in 2008 but stepped down.
- Michael Ma – Conservative MP for Markham—Unionville joined the Liberals on December 11, 2025, in support of Mark Carney's government.
- Nancy MacBeth – former Alberta PC MLA, came in second for the Alberta PC leadership in 1990 to Ralph Klein. Later quit the PCs and became the leader of the Alberta Liberals.
- Keith Martin – Reform/Alliance MP, left the new Conservatives soon after they formed to become a Liberal.
- Bill Matthews – PC MP elected in 1997. Switched to Liberals in 1999, but consequently lost the liberal nomination for the riding. Ran in another riding.
- Hubert Meilleur – former president of the ADQ, ran for the PLQ in 2007 and 2008.
- Charles Milliard – elected leader of the Quebec Liberal Party in 2026, was formerly a federal PC party member in his youth.
- Claude Morin – former ADQ MNA, ran for the federal Liberals in the 2011 election.
- Bruce Northrup – New Brunswick Progressive Conservative MLA for Sussex-Fundy-St. Martins from 2006 until a temporary retirement in 2020. Returned in the 2024 general election to run for the Liberal party.
- Bridget Pastoor – Alberta Liberal MLA elected in 2004, had previously supported the Tories under Lougheed.
- Joe Peschisolido – Ran for Alliance in 1997 in Etobicoke North. Alliance MP Richmond BC 2000–2002, joined the Liberals 28 January 2002. He lost the 2004 nomination to the person he had previously beaten, Raymond Chan.
- Andre Riedl – elected as Action démocratique du Québec MNA, crossed over to Quebec Liberal Party in 2008.
- Amanda Simard – MPP for Glengarry—Prescott—Russell (2018–2022), left the PC party to become an independent after disagreeing on policies relating to Franco-Ontarians in 2018. She then joined the Liberals in 2020.
- Belinda Stronach – Conservative Leadership candidate and MP elect in 2004, switched to the Liberals in 2005 in exchange for a cabinet position.
- Chantal Soucy – former CAQ MNA who later ran for the federal Liberals.
- Garth Turner – former PC/Conservative MP, switched to the Liberal Party after being kicked out of the Conservative Party.
- Jack Volrich – federal PC candidate in 1984, organized for the Liberals in 1993.
- Mark Warner – former Conservative candidate for Toronto Centre, he was removed by Stephen Harper. He later endorsed Liberal candidate Bob Rae.
- Marianne Wilkinson – former head of the Progressive Conservatives Women's Council and former mayor of Kanata, Ontario Liberal candidate for Lanark-Carleton in the 2003 election.

=== Conservative to New Democratic ===
This list also includes politicians who switched from Conservative parties to the Co-operative Commonwealth Federation.

- Amelia Boultbee – MLA for Penticton-Summerland joined the British Columbia New Democratic Party after having previously resigned from the Conservative Party of British Columbia caucus.
- John Edzerza – Yukon Party MLA 2002–2006, switched to the Yukon NDP in 2006 and ran as their candidate.
- David MacDonald – United Church Minister, PC MP Prince/Egmont 1965–1980, Rosedale 1988–1993. Ran for NDP in Toronto-Centre Rosedale in the 1997 federal election.
- Donald C. MacDonald – a Conservative Party supporter in his youth, switched to the CCF in the 1930s as a result of the Great Depression and became a CCF organizer, candidate, and Ontario CCF/NDP leader in the 1950s and 1960s and remained an MPP until the 1980s.
- Dr. Hinrich Bitter-Suermann – Liver transplant surgeon, born in 1940 in Berlin, Germany. Resided in Chester Basin, N.S. since 1982. Elected as a Progressive Conservative MLA in Chester- St. Margarets in 1998, but disagreed with the party's decision to support the Liberal budget and crossed the floor to join the NDP. He ran for Nova Scotia NDP leadership in 2000. He lost to the PC candidate in the 1999 Nova Scotia election, and again by approximately 200 votes in 2003.
- Robert Toupin – Quebec PC MP for Terrebonne, switched to NDP in 1986, then to Independent in 1987.
- Sandra Jansen – Alberta Progressive Conservative Party MLA, switched to NDP in 2016.
- Rafe Mair – former BC Socred MLA, later supported the BC Greens, supported the BC NDP in 2009.

=== Conservative to Green ===
- Jim Harris – Leader of the Green Party of Canada (2003–2006). A former Progressive Conservative member in the early 1980s.
- Douglas Roche – former PC MP and Senator, endorsed the Green Party in the 2008 federal election.
- David Scrymgeour – former (and first) Executive Director of the Conservative Party of Canada. Served as campaign director for Jim Flaherty's Ontario PC leadership bid before switching to the Green Party.

=== Conservative to Bloc/Parti Québécois ===
- Rodrigue Biron - Union Nationale leader, elected as a PQ MNA, later ran for the BQ.
- Lucien Bouchard – Quebec Premier 1996–2001 / PC MP under the Mulroney government, elected in 1988, then created the federal version of the Parti Québécois, the Bloc Québécois, leader of the Bloc to 1996, before becoming Premier of Quebec.
- Gilbert Chartrand – Tory MP for Verdun—Saint-Paul from 1984, left the PCs in 1990 to serve as an independent and then joined the BQ when it was founded, rejoined the Progressive Conservatives in 1991, retired in 1993.
- Antonio Flamand – Union Nationale MNA, later ran for PQ.
- François Gérin – PC MP elected for Mégantic—Compton—Stanstead in 1984. Left the PCs in 1990 to become an Independent and then a founding member of the BQ. Retired in 1993.
- Nic LeBlanc – PC MP 1984–1992 for Longueuil and then became a Bloc MP 1992–1997. Later ran for the Canadian Alliance in 2000 and the Conservatives in 2004.
- Marcel Masse – former PC cabinet minister, joined PQ in the 1990s and served in several provincial cabinet positions.
- Louis Plamondon – PC MP Bas-Richelieu—Nicolet—Bécancour from 1984 until 1990. Left PCs with Bouchard to become an Independent and then a founding member of the BQ. Re-elected as BQ in 1993, 1997, 2000, 2004, 2006, 2008 and 2011.
- Jérôme Proulx – Union Nationale MNA, later ran for PQ.
- Benoît Tremblay – PC MP for Rosemont—La Petite-Patrie elected in 1988. Left PCs with Bouchard after the failure of Meech Lake to sit as Independent. Founding member of the BQ. Re-elected in 1993, retired in 1997.
- Pierrette Venne – PC MP Saint Hubert 1988–1991, BQ 1991–2004.

=== Conservative to other/none ===
This list also includes politicians who switched from one conservative party to another. During the merger of Alberta's PC and Wildrose parties, multiple MLAs switched parties to join the newly-formed UCP. Other examples of this are when almost all Alliance and Reform MPs joined to form the modern federal Conservatives.

- Rick Borotsik – Manitoba PC MP from 1997 to 2004 for Brandon, quit the new merged Conservatives over Harper's right-wing views. He later became a Manitoba PC MLA.
- Kim Campbell – former Prime Minister of Canada and leader of the Progressive Conservatives. Did not join the merged Conservative Party.
- Joe Clark – former Prime Minister of Canada and two-time leader of the Progressive Conservatives. Did not join the merged Conservative Party.
- Richard Holden – Ran as a PC candidate in the 1979 federal election, elected as an MNA for the Equality Party, crossed the floor to join the Parti Québécois.
- Flora MacDonald – former "Red Tory" PC MP, leadership candidate and cabinet minister. MacDonald voted for the New Democrats in the 2004 election.
- Rob Anderson – Alberta MLA, crossed the floor from Alberta PCs to Wildrose Alliance in 2010.
- Joe Anglin MLA (Rimbey-Rocky Mountain House-Sundre) quit the Wildrose Alliance caucus to sit as an Independent MLA on November 3, 2014, stating that he had found out he was about to be expelled due to his public criticisms of the party leader's advisers. In January 2015, he announced that he will be seeking the Progressive Conservative nomination in his riding; the nomination meeting is to be held February 21, 2015. Updated refer to versus.
- Maxime Bernier – MP for Beauce (2006–2019), left the Conservatives to create the People's Party of Canada in 2018, lost re-election as MP for Beauce in 2019.
- Jan Brown – Reform MP for Calgary Southeast. Jan Brown became a PC in June 1997.
- Craig Chandler – social conservative, has at different times either run for, or supported, the Social Credit Party, the Reform Party, the Progressive Conservative Party, the Conservative Party, and the Alberta Alliance/Wildrose Alliance.
- Hugh Curtis – BC PC MLA, crossed floor to the Socreds, serving in a variety of government posts.
- Douglas Edmondson – served as leader of the Manitoba Confederations of Regions Party, had previously been a Progressive Conservative.
- Marc Emery – Marijuana activist, joined the People's Party of Canada in 2018.
- Jake Epp – federal PC cabinet minister, later joined Canadian Alliance.
- Ernie Eves – Premier of Ontario and supporter of the Progressive Conservative Party of Canada, briefly took a membership in the Canadian Alliance to support Tom Long's leadership bid before returning to the federal PCs.
- Heather Forsyth – Alberta MLA, crossed the floor from Alberta PCs to Wildrose Alliance in 2010.
- John A. Gamble, PC MP, sought Reform Party nomination in 1993.
- Jim Jones – Elected as a PC, joined the Canadian Alliance.
- Belinda Karahalios – MPP for Cambridge (2018–2022). She created the New Blue Party of Ontario after being kicked out of the PC caucus for voting against Bill 195.
- Peter Kaufmann – Winnipeg municipal politician, supported federal PCs before switching to Canadian Alliance in 2000.
- Eric Lefebvre – former CAQ MNA who later became a federal Conservative MP.
- Jack MacLaren – MPP for Carleton—Mississippi Mills (2011–2018). He joined the Trillium Party of Ontario after being kicked out of the PC Party for comments made about Franco-Ontarians.
- Preston Manning – Reform Party founder, ran for the Social Credit Party of Canada in the 1960s.
- Rick Nicholls – MPP for Chatham-Kent—Leamington (2011–2022). He joined the Ontario Party after being kicked out of the PC Party for being unvaccinated against COVID-19.
- Randy Hillier – former Ontario PC MPP who later joined the PPC.
- Jay Hill – former federal Conservative MP who later joined the provincial Maverick Party.
- Gurmant Grewal – former federal Conservative MP who later joined the PPC.
- Brian Pallister – former Manitoba PC cabinet minister, ran as a federal PC candidate, later elected as a Canadian Alliance MP.
- William Shaw – former Union Nationale MNA and federal Progressive Conservative, later ran for the Equality Party and the Canadian Alliance.
- Derek Sloan – former federal Conservative MP who was expelled from the party in 2021 and later became leader of the Ontario Party.
- Danielle Smith, leader of the Wildrose Alliance and eight members of her caucus: Rob Anderson, Gary Bikman, Rod Fox, Jason Hale, Bruce McAllister, Blake Pedersen, Bruce Rowe and Jeff Wilson announced on December 17, 2014 that they were crossing the floor to join the governing Alberta PC party's caucus.
- Larry Spencer, former Alliance MP, removed from caucus for controversial social views, ran in 2004 election as independent, now a member of the Christian Heritage Party, serving as interim president.
- Kerry Towle – MLA (Innisfail-Sylvan Lake), and Ian Donovan MLA (Little Bow) left the Wildrose Alliance to join the ruling Alberta PC Party's caucus on November 24, 2014.
- Gaston Tremblay – Union Nationale MNA, crossed over to the Ralliement créditiste du Québec.
- Trueman Tuck – ran for the Freedom Party of Ontario, later leader of Republican Party of Ontario.
- Maïté Blanchette Vézina, MNA for Rimouski, joined the Quebec Conservative Party after previously resigning from the Coalition Avenir Québec.
- Claire Samson, MNA for Iberville, joined the Quebec Conservative Party after previously being removed from the Coalition Avenir Quebec.
- Robert N. Thompson – Social Credit leader from 1961 to 1967, re-elected as a Progressive Conservative in 1968.
- Gérard Deltell – ADQ MNA who joined the CAQ after its merger.
- Éric Caire – ADQ MNA who joined the CAQ.
- Marc Picard – ADQ MNA who joined the CAQ.
- Sébastien Schneeberger – ADQ member who joined the CAQ.
- Sylvie Roy – ADQ MNA who joined the CAQ after its merger.
- Janvier Grondin – ADQ MNA who joined the CAQ after its merger.
- François Bonnardel – ADQ MNA who joined the CAQ after its merger.
- Pascale Déry – CAQ MNA who was previously a federal Conservative candidate.
- Éric Duhaime – Quebec Conservative leader who was previously a CAQ and ADQ member.
- Dallas Brodie – BC Conservative MLA who founded OneBC in 2025.
- Tara Armstrong – BC Conservative MLA who founded OneBC in June 2025. Became an independent in December 2025.
- Peter Guthrie – former UCP MLA who founded the provincial Progressive Tory Party in 2025.
- Rick Fraser – former UCP MLA who joined the Alberta Party in 2018.
- Derek Fildebrandt – former UCP MLA who joined the Freedom Conservative Party of Alberta in 2018.

== Liberal Party ==
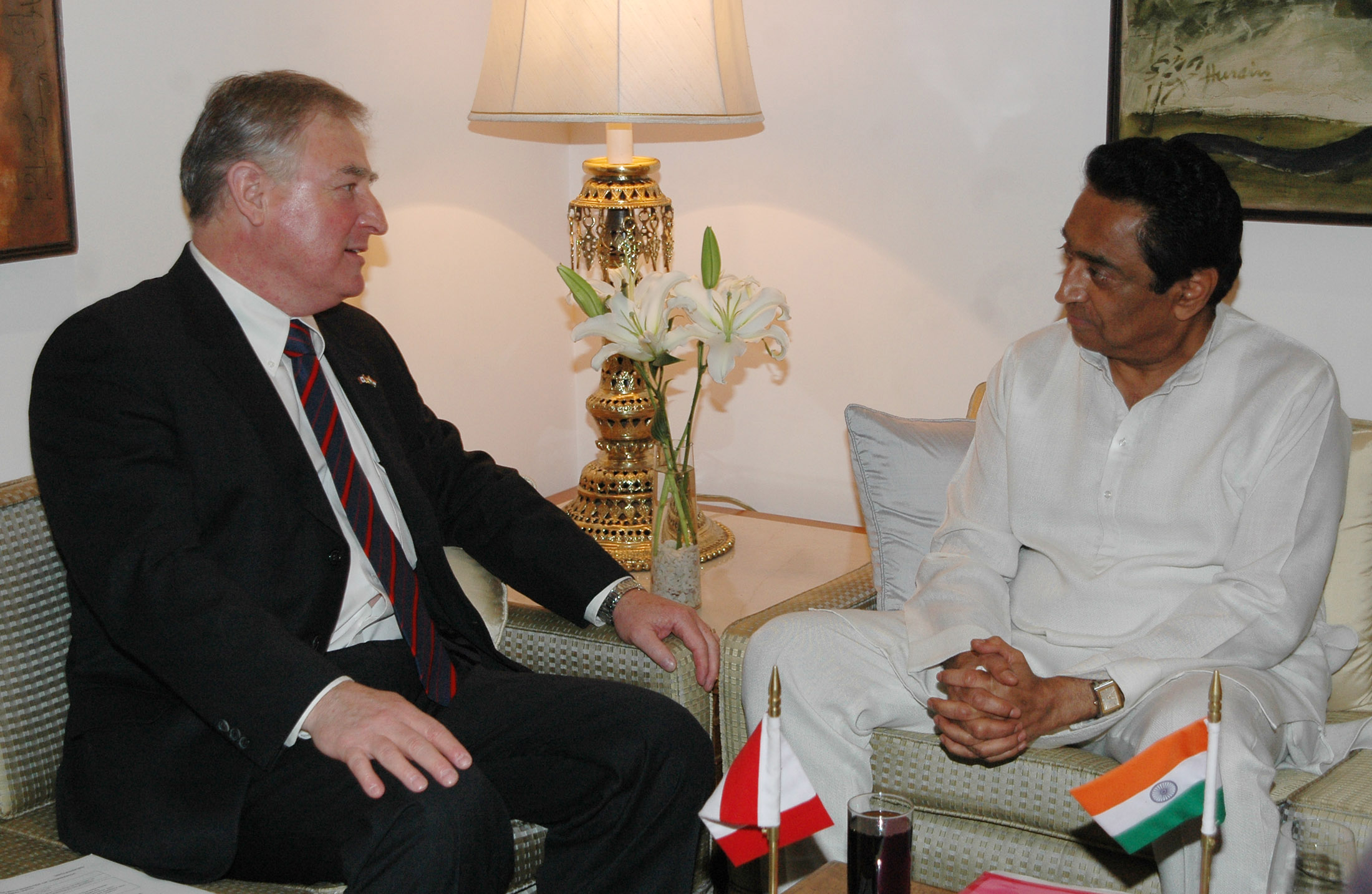
David Emerson (left) quit the Liberals and joined the Conservatives shortly after the 2006 federal election

=== Liberal to Conservative ===
- Jean Allaire – former Quebec Liberal Party member, first leader of the Action démocratique du Québec.
- Leona Alleslev – Liberal MP for Aurora—Oak Ridges—Richmond Hill, switched to the Conservative Party on September 17, 2018.
- Gérard Latulippe – a former Quebec Liberal MNA, won as a Coalition Avenir Québec candidate in 2022.
- Jim Belanger – federal Conservative MP who ran for a federal Liberal nomination in 2015.
- Bob Bjornerud – Saskatchewan Liberal MLA, helped form the Saskatchewan Party.
- John Rustad – MLA for Nechako Lakes (2005–), he was expelled from the BC Liberal (now BC United) caucus for suggesting CO_{2} emissions were not contributing to climate change. He then joined the BC Conservatives in 2023 and became their leader.
- Elenore Sturko, MLA for Surrey South, left BC United to join the Conservative Party of British Columbia in 2024.
- Iain Black – former BC Liberal MLA who joined the BC Conservatives.
- Bruce Banman – MLA for Abbotsford South (2020–), left BC United to join the BC Conservatives in 2023.
- Scott McInnis – former BC United member who joined the BC Conservatives.
- Trevor Halford – BC United MLA who joined the BC Conservatives.
- Peter Milobar – BC United MLA who joined the BC Conservatives.
- Ian Paton – BC United MLA who joined the BC Conservatives.
- Teresa Wat – BC United MLA who joined the BC Conservatives.
- Lorne Doerkson – BC United MLA who joined the BC Conservatives.
- John Bryden – the Liberal MP for Ancaster-Dundas-Flamborough-Aldershot from 1993 to 2004, he quit the Liberals over integrity issues, believing that the cities shouldn't get any money from the federal government. He later sought the merged Conservative Party's nomination for Ancaster-Dundas-Flamborough-Aldershot and lost.
- Lawrence Cannon – former Quebec Liberal Cabinet Minister, Candidate for Conservatives in Pontiac in the 2005 federal election.
- Annamarie Castrilli – Ontario Liberal MPP elected in 1995 for Downsview. Switched to the PCs and ran for them in another riding in 1999, losing badly.
- Joe Comuzzi – former Liberal MP, switched to the Conservatives over Same-Sex Marriage
- Anne Cools - anti-poverty and housing advocate, Toronto Centre-Rosedale candidate in 1980, appointed by Pierre Trudeau to the Senate in 1984. As a senator, she switched over to the Conservatives on June 8, 2004.
- John Crosbie – Liberal Newfoundland MHA, switched to Newfoundland PCs, then PC MP, outspoken finance minister for Joe Clark's government.
- June Draude – Saskatchewan Liberal MLA, helped form the Saskatchewan Party.
- Pierre Dufour – CAQ MNA who ran for the federal Liberals in 2015.
- Mario Dumont – former head of Quebec Liberal Party youth wing, helped found and later led Action démocratique du Québec
- David Emerson – Liberal MP and cabinet Minister elected in 2004 for Vancouver Kingsway, switched parties before even being sworn into his seat. Switched to the Conservatives on 6 February 2006 so he could keep his cabinet job.
- Rod Gantefoer – Saskatchewan Liberal MLA, helped form the Saskatchewan Party.
- Raminder Gill – Ontario PC MPP 1999–2003. He was initially a Liberal, but after losing the 1993 federal Liberal nomination to Gurbax Malhi, he became a Conservative.
- Stephen Harper – said he used to be a Pierre Trudeau Liberal and was involved in a Young Liberals group as a youth
- Paul Hellyer – former Liberal MP. He was invited by Federal Progressive Conservative Leader Robert Stansfield to join and accepted. He later quit over Free Trade and started a new party, Canadian Action Party. He has recently sought to merge the Canadian Action Party with the New Democratic Party.
- Rahim Jaffer – Reform/Alliance/Conservative MP for Edmonton Strathcona, said he used to be a Liberal.
- Jamil Jivani – Conservative MP for Durham, said he used to have a Liberal membership.
- Wajid Khan – 2007 – switched from Liberal MP to Conservative MP after his appointment as special advisor to Prime Minister Stephen Harper on the Middle East and Afghanistan, after Liberal leader Stéphane Dion ordered Khan to terminate his relationship with Harper.
- Ralph Klein – a Liberal supporter until the 1988 federal election, when he endorsed the federal Mulroney Tories. Was elected to the Alberta legislature as a Tory in 1989 and became Premier in 1992.
- Steve Kooner – a BC Conservative MLA who previously ran for a federal Liberal nomination.
- Ken Krawetz – Saskatchewan Liberal MLA, helped form the Saskatchewan Party.
- Gérard Latulippe – Quebec Liberal MNA and Cabinet Minister in the 1980s, ran for Canadian Alliance in 2000.
- Robert Layton – Liberal Party organizer in Quebec, switched to the Tories in the early 1980s and was elected to the House of Commons in 1984 as a Tory MP, appointed to cabinet.
- Sylvie Lespérance – former Quebec Liberal Party candidate, elected in a by-election for the ADQ.
- Joseph McEwen – Ontario Liberal MPP for Frontenac—Addington 1975–1984, switched to Ontario PC in 1984, then lost
- Tim Peterson – Ontario Liberal MPP for Mississauga South elected in 2003, left the Liberals to sit as an independent in 2007, and ran for the Ontario PC party in the 2007 election.
- Brendan Maguire – Nova Scotia Liberal MLA who joined the Nova Scotia PCs.
- Ellis Ross – BC Conservative MP who was a former BC Liberal MLA.
- Fred Tilley – Nova Scotia Liberal MLA who joined the Nova Scotia PCs.
- Marvin Shore – Ontario Liberal MPP for London North 1975–1976, switched to Tories 1976–1977, then lost.
- Stephen Woodworth – former Conservative Kitchener Centre MP, ran for the Liberals in Waterloo in the 1988 election.
- Dominique Vien – former Quebec Liberal MNA and later federal Conservative MP.

=== Liberal to New Democratic ===
- John Aldag, a former federal Liberal MP, ran for the BC NDP in 2024. He later ran for the Liberals in the 2025 federal election.
- Jean Allard – Manitoba Liberal candidate for Rupertsland in 1966. He won the riding of Churchill for the NDP in 1969. He quit the NDP in 1972 to sit as an independent.
- Linda Asper – sister of Israel Asper (Founder of Global, Manitoba Liberal Party Leader 1970–1975), ran for Manitoba Liberals in 1990, NDP MLA 1999–2003, then resigned to take up an international job position.
- Buckley Belanger – Saskatchewan Liberal MLA elect in 1995. He switched to the NDP, and a by-election was held in 1998, where he was re-elected as a New Democrat.
- Françoise Boivin – Liberal MP for Gatineau 2003–2006; re-elected for the same riding as a New Democrat in 2011.
- Thérèse Casgrain – First leader of Quebec CCF, had previously been a Liberal.
- Richard Cashin – from Liberal MP from Newfoundland in the 1960s, later Newfoundland NDP President in the 1970s
- Alex Cullen – Ontario MPP Elected in a by-election in Ottawa West in 1997, switched to the NDP in November 1998 after losing the nomination to the brother of the mayor of Ottawa. He lost in the 1999 election.
- Laurent Desjardins – Manitoba Liberal MLA for St. Boniface, who decided to support the minority NDP government in 1969 to stop any attempts of the Liberals, Progressive Conservative and Social Credit of trying to create a coalition government. He officially joined the NDP in 1972.
- Dennis Drainville – former Ontario NDP MPP 1990–1993, ran for Ontario Liberals in 1981 in Riverdale
- Sam Drover – Liberal MHA in Newfoundland from 1949–1955. He switched to the CCF and became the 1st CCF-NDP in Newfoundland. He became the leader, but he lost his seat, and the party won no ridings.
- Pauline Jewett – Liberal MP from 1963 to 1965. Quit party over the implementation of the War Measures Act in 1970. Moved to British Columbia and sat as an NDP MP from 1979 to 1988.
- Jack Layton – former head of the Liberal Party Quebec Youth Wing; joined the NDP in the 1970s. Federal NDP Leader (2003–2011).
- Alexa McDonough – worked for the Nova Scotia Liberals in the 1970 provincial election. Was disappointed by the Gerald Regan government and switched to the NDP to work on the 1974 federal election campaign of her father Lloyd R. Shaw. Subsequently, ran for the NDP, became provincial NDP leader in 1980 and federal leader in the 1990s.
- Jim Melenchuk – Saskatchewan Liberal MLA, switched to Independent to maintain a spot in cabinet but would run in the 2003 election as an NDP candidate.
- Rob Miyashiro – former Alberta Liberal candidate, later became Alberta NDP MLA.
- Thomas Mulcair – former Quebec Liberal environment minister, later became the NDP MP for Outremont and federal NDP leader.
- Ron Osika – Saskatchewan Liberal MLA, switched to Independent to maintain spot in cabinet but would run in the 2003 election as an NDP candidate.
- Gordon Wilson – former BC Liberal leader, was defeated in a leadership challenge after having an affair with a fellow Liberal MLA. He left to start his own party, the Progressive Democratic Alliance, winning his own seat. He later joined the NDP and ran for its leadership. He lost the leadership race and his seat in 2001.

=== Liberal to Green ===
- Deborah Coyne – Liberal candidate in Toronto—Danforth for the 2006 federal election; sought the Liberal nomination unsuccessfully in Don Valley West and Ottawa West—Nepean. Ran for the Liberal Party leadership in 2013. Joined the Greens in February 2015 to become senior policy adviser to party leader Elizabeth May.
- Wilfred Roussel – New Brunswick Liberal MLA from 2014–2018. Ran in the 2024 general election as a candidate for the Green Party of New Brunswick.
- Blair Wilson – elected as a Liberal MP in 2006, left the Liberal caucus after being accused of financial impropriety, joined the Green Party on August 30, 2008, becoming its first ever Member of Parliament.

=== Liberal to Bloc/Parti Québécois ===
- Gaston Gourde, former Liberal Party MP, contested the 1998 Quebec election as a PQ candidate and the 2011 federal election as a Bloc candidate.
- René Lévesque – Quebec Liberal MNA and Cabinet minister, quit in 1967 to become an independent MNA, co-founded the Parti Québécois in 1968.
- Gilles Rocheleau – Hull-Aylmer, elected as a Liberal in 1988, then switched to the Bloc, and lost under the Bloc banner in 1993.
- Jean-François Simard – previously a Liberal supporter who joined the PQ and Bloc. He later joined the CAQ and was elected as an MNA.

=== Liberal to other/none ===
- Karin Kirkpatrick – former BC United MLA who founded Centre BC in 2025.
- Thomas Crerar – Liberal-Unionist, later became leader of the Progressive Party of Canada, returned to the Liberal Party.
- Robert Forke – former Liberal, became Progressive Party of Canada leader, later returned to Liberals.
- Mel Hurtig – former Federal Liberal Candidate in Alberta (Edmonton West) in 1972, started National Party to stop free trade.
- Donald Pennell – Ontario Liberal Party candidate in the 1975 election, first leader of the Family Coalition Party in 1987.
- Dave Taylor – Alberta MLA, switched affiliation from Liberal to Independent in April 2010, and then to Alberta Party in January 2011.
- Jack Davis – federal Liberal cabinet minister, later served as a Social Credit provincial cabinet minister in BC.
- Bill Vander Zalm – ran for federal Liberals in 1968 and the BC Liberals in the early 1970s; he later became BC Premier under Social Credit.

== New Democratic Party ==
This list also includes politicians who switched from the Co-operative Commonwealth Federation to other parties.

=== New Democratic to Liberal ===
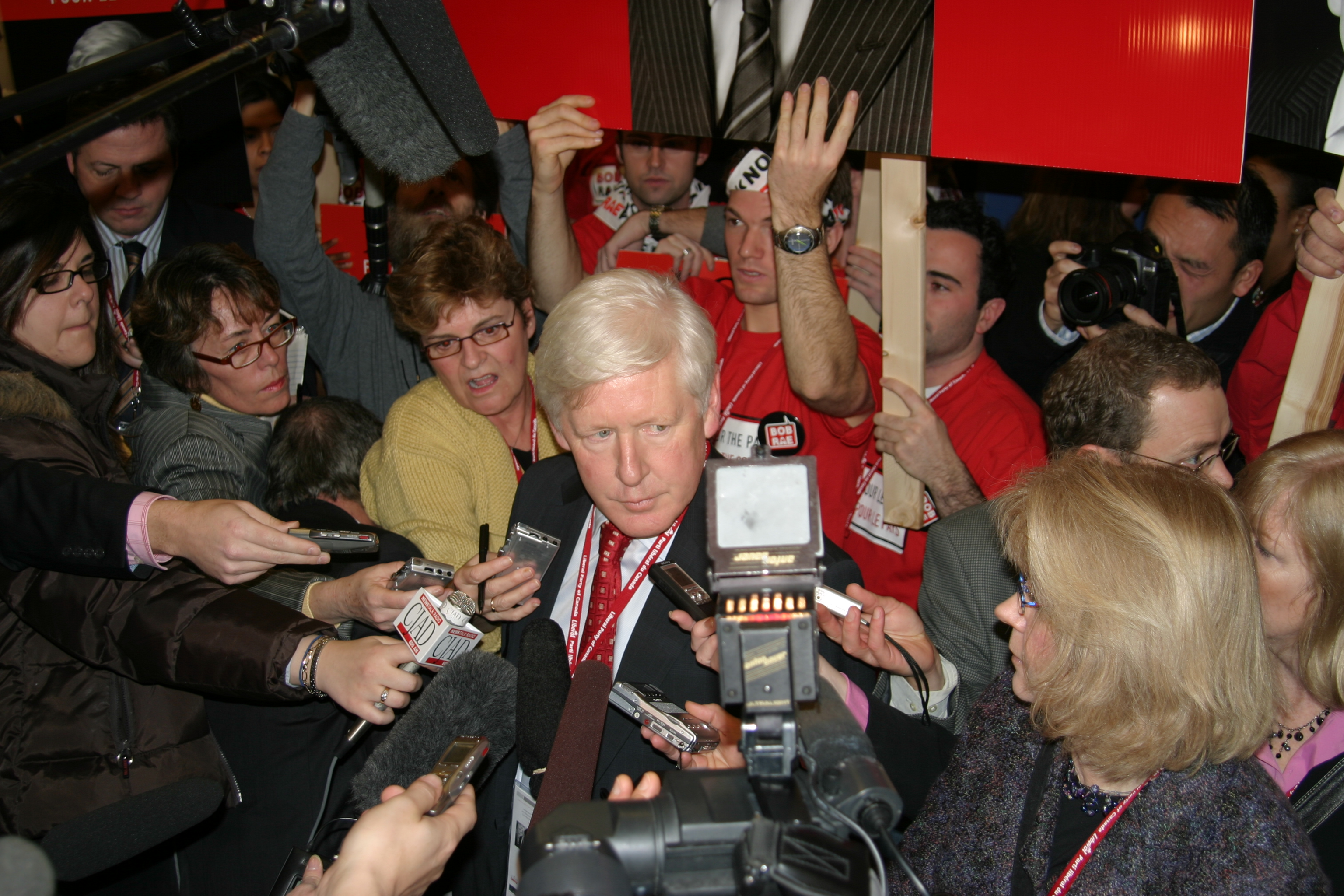
Bob Rae, the former NDP Premier of Ontario, is now a member of the Liberal Party

- Jeremy Akerman – former Nova Scotia NDP Leader (1968–1980) and MLA (1970–1980); switched to Liberals in 1981 and ran in a Nova Scotia provincial by-election for them.
- Hazen Argue – CCF MP 1945–1961, CCF leader 1960–1961, lost the NDP leadership in 1961, and out of bitterness later that year joined the Liberals as an MP from 1961 to 1963. As a Senator, he served in the Trudeau Cabinet (1980–1982) when no Liberal MPs were elected west of Winnipeg. He was a Liberal senator from 1966 to 1988, when fraud charges were brought against him, but he died before they could be brought to trial.
- Chris Axworthy – former NDP MP in the 1980s, and MLA/Cabinet Minister for Saskatchewan NDP in the 1990s, and Saskatchewan NDP leadership candidate in 2000, ran for the federal Liberals in the 2004 and 2006 elections.
- Bill Barlee – former NDP MLA/Cabinet Minister in B.C., federal Liberal candidate in 2000 election for Kootenay-Boundary-Okanagan.
- Joan Beatty – former Saskatchewan NDP MLA and Cabinet Minister, later became the Liberal candidate for Desnethé-Missinippi-Churchill River in the 2008 by-election.
- Doly Begum – former deputy leader of the Ontario New Democratic Party and member of Provincial Parliament; will run in the 2026 Scarborough Southwest federal by-election for the Liberal Party of Canada.
- Buckley Belanger - former Saskatchewan NDP MLA for the riding of Athabasca, was elected as a member of the Liberal Party and then quit to join the NDP. Left the NDP in 2021 to run for the federal election as a member of the Liberal Party for the riding of Desnethé—Missinippi—Churchill River.
- Michel Bissonnet – active in the federal and provincial NDP wings in Quebec, later Quebec Liberal Party MNA and President of the National Assembly.
- Elmer Buchanan – Agriculture minister in the Ontario NDP government of Bob Rae (1990–1995). Left the NDP in 2006 to support Rae's bid to lead the Liberal Party of Canada. Appointed by the provincial Liberal government to serve as vice chair of the Ontario Farm Products and Marketing Commission.
- Raymond Cho – Toronto city councillor, ran for federal NDP in 1988, subsequently unsuccessfully sought the provincial and Liberal nominations, ran for the Ontario Progressive Conservatives in 2013 and again in a 2016 by-election.
- True Davidson – former mayor of East York, was a CCF candidate a few times, but later became a Liberal in the 1970s.
- Ujjal Dosanjh – former NDP Premier of B.C. (2000–2001), later Liberal MP for Surrey (2004–2011).
- Lillian Dyck – former NDP member, sat in the Senate as "Independent New Democrat", joined Liberals in 2009.
- Eric Fairclough – former Yukon NDP Leader and Yukon NDP MLA switched to the Liberals in 2006.
- Tarek Fateh – prominent NDP organizer and past candidate became a Liberal in 2006.
- Kevin Flynn – Liberal MPP Oakville, ran for Ontario NDP in 1985 in Oakville.
- Eugene Forsey – founding member and long-time organizer of the CCF, president of the CCF in Quebec and a federal CCF candidate in Ottawa in 1948 and 1949. Left shortly after the creation of the NDP in 1961 because of the new party's view on Quebec. Appointed to the Senate as a Liberal in 1970.
- Henri-François Gautrin – Leader of the Quebec NDP, elected as a provincial Liberal.
- Rosemary Godin – NDP MLA in Nova Scotia, Sackville-Beaver Bank 1998–1999, ran provincially for Liberals in Dartmouth North in 2003.
- Barbara Hall – former mayor of Toronto, ran for Ontario NDP in 1985 in the St. David riding of Toronto
- Elijah Harper – Manitoba NDP MLA for Rupertsland 1981–1992, Liberal MP for Churchill 1993–1997.
- Lori Idlout – MP for Nunavut 2021–present
- Norman Jamison – Ontario NDP MPP Norfolk 1990–1995, website Rabble.ca says he's a liberal
- Rick Laliberte – elected for NDP in 1997 for Churchill River, switched to Liberals just before the 2000 election, in September 2000. He won but became an independent, then lost in 2004.
- Laurier Lapierre – co-host of This Hour Has Seven Days, NDP candidate in 1968, later Liberal Senator and the first openly gay Senator in Canada
- Anthony Lupusella – Ontario NDP MPP 1975–1986 for Dovercourt, switched to Liberals from 1986 to 1990 after losing the NDP nomination for the riding.
- Paul MacEwan – Nova Scotia NDP MLA in the 1970s, ran 4 times as NDP (1967-1970-1974-1978), once as independent (1981), then he started the Cape Breton Labour Party and ran once (1984), then again as independent (1988), then three times as a Liberal. (1993-1998-1999)
- Giorgio Mammoliti – Ontario NDP MPP for Yorkview 1990–1995, Toronto City Councillor 1998–2018, slowly became alienated from the NDP, and moved towards right-wing politics.
- Stephanie McLean – former Alberta NDP MLA who became a federal Liberal MP in 2025.
- Gary McRobb – Yukon NDP MLA switched to the Liberals in May 2006.
- Doug Moffatt – NDP MPP for Durham East, later ran twice for the federal Liberals.
- Glen Murray – former mayor of Winnipeg, originally a New Democrat but ran for the Liberals in the 2004 federal election.
- Dave Neumann – former Ontario Liberal MPP for Brantford, previously ran for the Ontario NDP.
- John Nunziata – a York City Councillor at the time, He quit the NDP after losing the NDP nomination for the 1982 York South by-election to Ontario NDP leader-elect Bob Rae.
- Jackie Pement – former BC NDP Cabinet Minister, gave vocal support to Gordon Campbell.
- Elmore Philpott – left the Liberals to join the Co-operative Commonwealth Federation in the 1930s, becoming Ontario CCF President. Left the party to become an independent, moved to British Columbia and was elected a Liberal MP from 1953 to 1957.
- Bob Rae – Former NDP MP (1978–1982), leader of the Ontario NDP (1982–1996) and NDP Premier of Ontario (1990–1995); left the NDP in 2002 citing Svend Robinson's "behaviour" towards Israel (National Post); subsequently ran as a candidate in the 2006 Liberal Party of Canada leadership election, became a Liberal MP (2008–2013) and became interim Liberal leader from 2011 to 2013.
- David Ramsay – Ontario NDP MPP Timiskaming 1985–1986 / Ontario Liberal MPP Timiskaming 1986–2000, and Ontario Liberal MPP Timiskaming/Cochrane 2000+ – He was elected as an NDP MPP in 1985 when Ontario elected a Liberal minority government, and he became a member of the joint party cabinet. In 1986, he switched to the Peterson Liberals. As of 2006, he is currently the Ontario Minister for Northern Resources.
- Gregor Robertson – Former NDP MLA in British Columbia for Vancouver-Fairview (2005–2008) and Mayor of Vancouver. Was elected as a Liberal member of Parliament for Vancouver Fraserview—South Burnaby in the 2025 federal election.
- Zoe Royer – a federal Liberal MP who previously ran for the federal NDP.
- Rathika Sitsabaiesan – NDP MP for Scarborough—Rouge River from 2011 to 2015, switched to Ontario Liberal Party in April 2016 to unsuccessfully run for the party's nomination for a provincial by-election in Scarborough—Rouge River.
- Reid Scott – Ontario CCF MPP for Beaches (Toronto) from 1948 to 1952 and NDP MP for Danforth from 1962 to 1968, joined the Liberal Party in 2008 at the age of 82.
- Lise St-Denis – switched to the federal Liberals on January 10, 2012, saying in French to explain her move: "Voters voted for Jack Layton. Jack Layton is dead."
- Paul Summerville – prominent economist, NDP star candidate in 2006 election in St. Paul's, left NDP to support Bob Rae's leadership bid.
- Ross Thatcher – former CCF (NDP) MP in Saskatchewan, became a Liberal, and later Premier of Saskatchewan for the Liberals.
- Glenn Thibeault – NDP MP for Sudbury resigns his seat in 2014 to be appointed the Ontario Liberal Party's candidate in a provincial by-election, which he subsequently won.
- Peter Trites – NDP MLA Saint John's Champlain 1984 (byelection)-1987 (switch to Liberals for the 1987 election, NDP lost).
- Pierre Trudeau – former Prime Minister of Canada, was a supporter of the CCF in the 1950s.
- Dan Waters – Ontario NDP MPP Muskoka-Georgian Bay 1990–1995, ran for Ontario Liberals 2003 in Parry Sound-Muskoka.
- Lenore Zann – a Nova Scotia MLA, who left the Nova Scotia NDP to run as a federal Liberal Party candidate in the upcoming federal election, while continuing to serve as an Independent MLA in the province for the time being.

=== New Democratic to Conservative ===
- Brian Ashton – Toronto City Councillor, former New Democrat who lost the nomination for the NDP in a Scarborough riding, and later became a Red Tory.
- Chak Au, formerly a BC NDP candidate, is now a federal Conservative MP.
- Garry Breitkreuz – Conservative MP, was previously a New Democratic Party member and supporter.
- Lela Evans – MHA for Torngat Mountains (2019–), joined the NDP in 2022. Returned to Progressive Conservatives in 2025.
- Dennis Fentie - Premier of Yukon, former Yukon NDP MLA - he quit the NDP and a few months later became Premier of the Yukon for the right-wing Yukon Party.
- Peter Fenwick – former Newfoundland NDP leader, first NDP elected to the Newfoundland Assembly in 1984. He ran for the Canadian Alliance in 2000.
- Peter North – NDP MPP Elgin 1990–1993, became independent after trying to become a PC party member but instead being rebuffed by Mike Harris's PCs, re-elected in 1995.
- Angela Vautour – 1st elected as an NDP MP in New Brunswick in 1997, switched to the PCs in September 1999. She lost her riding to a Liberal in 2000. Ran again for the New Conservatives in 2004.
- Ryan Cleary – NDP MP for St. John's South—Mount Pearl from 2011 to 2015, ran for the Progressive Conservative Party of Newfoundland and Labrador in Windsor Lake in the 2015 provincial election and was defeated.
- Dominic Cardy – leader of the New Brunswick New Democratic Party from 2011 to 2017, quit as both party leader and member on January 1, 2017. He later joined the New Brunswick Progressive Conservative Party and became a cabinet minister and MLA.
- Tamara Kronis, now a federal Conservative MP, was previously a member of the federal NDP.
- Frank Calder – Longtime BC NDP MLA, switched to SoCred in 1975. He lost by 1 vote to NDP candidate Al Passerall in 1979.

=== New Democratic to Green ===
- Dan Biocchi – Green Party candidate in 2004 for Ottawa-Orleans. He was an NDP member and the Executive Assistant to former NDP MP Cid Samson.
- Marc Emery – Marijuana activist. Emery has been a public supporter of the New Democratic Party from 2003 to 2015 as a result of Jack Layton's support for the decriminalization of marijuana. In the 2009 BC provincial election, Emery supported the Green Party of British Columbia. His wife, Jodie Emery, was the BC Green candidate in Vancouver-Fraserview. Emery subsequently joined the Conservative Party of Canada in order to support Maxime Bernier's leadership candidacy.
- Bruce Hyer – First elected as an NDP MP (Thunder Bay—Superior North) in 2008, he quit the party to sit as an independent in 2012 before joining the Green Party in 2013. Hyer was the second Green MP to sit in Parliament. He was defeated by Liberal candidate Patty Hajdu in the 2015 federal election.
- Peter Ittinuar – former NDP MP for Nunavut, Green Party candidate for Nunavut in the 2008 federal election.
- Paul Manly – The son of former New Democratic Party MP Jim Manly, he originally sought the NDP nomination in Nanaimo—Ladysmith for the 2015 federal election, but was blocked from standing due to his stance with the Israeli-Palestinian conflict. He subsequently joined the Green Party, and stood as their candidate in both 2015, where he placed fourth, and the 2019 by-election, where he was elected (becoming the second elected Green MP).
- Pierre Nantel – following revelations that he had been in private talks to cross the floor to another political party, he was removed from caucus and deselected as a candidate in the upcoming 2019 election. Days later, he announced he had joined the Green Party while remaining as a sitting Independent in Parliament before the next federal election began and would run as their candidate in the 2019 election.
- José Núñez-Melo – NDP MP who joined the Green Party after Parliament was dissolved for the 2015 federal election.

=== New Democratic to Bloc Québécois/Parti Québécois ===
- Denis Lazure – ran for federal NDP twice in the 1960s, elected as a PQ MNA in the 1970s.
- Claude Patry – NDP MP crossed the floor to the Bloc in 2013.
- Rémy Trudel – NDP candidate in the 1988 federal election, later served as PQ MNA and cabinet minister.

=== New Democratic to other/none ===
- Alexandre Boulerice – NDP MP who left caucus to run as a Quebec solidaire candidate in the 2026 Quebec general election.
- Buzz Hargrove – CAW president and long-time NDP supporter, expelled from the NDP in 2006 after endorsing several Liberal candidates since 1999.
- Sidney Green – Winnipeg Lawyer, Manitoba NDP MLA in the 1960s/1970s, ran for Manitoba NDP leadership in 1969 as the radical leftist candidate. In 1979, he declared at an NDP convention, claiming "the trade union movement and militant feminists" had taken control of the party. In 1981, he started the Progressive Party of Manitoba with 2 other NDP MLAs Ben Hanuschak and Bud Boyce.
- Ted W. Kulp – former NDP candidate, founder and only candidate of the Forward Canada Party in the 1997 federal election.
- James Laxer – Runner-up at the 1971 NDP federal leadership convention and leader of The Waffle with Mel Watkins, left the NDP with the Waffle in 1972 to form the Movement for an Independent Socialist Canada as an independent party. Rejoined the NDP in the 1980s.
- Paul MacEwan – Nova Scotia NDP MLA in the 1970s, ran 4 times as NDP (1967-1970-1974-1978), once as independent (1981), then he started the Cape Breton Labour Party and ran once (1984), then again as independent (1988), then three times as a Liberal. (1993-1998-1999)
- Murdoch MacKay – Manitoba NDP President in the 1970s, left to co-found the Progressive Party of Manitoba.
- Jean-François Larose – left the NDP to help form the new party Strength in Democracy.
- Neil Reynolds – former NDP supporter, gained a party record 13% running for the Libertarian Party of Canada in a by-election, later became party leader.
- Al Passarell – BC NDP MLA for Atlin crossed to Social Credit in 1985.
- Karen McPherson – NDP MLA who joined the Alberta Party in 2017.

== Green Party ==
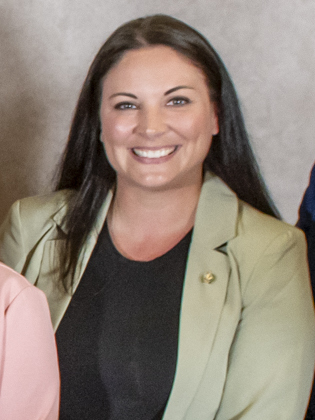
Jenica Atwin left the Greens and joined the Liberals in 2021

=== Green to Conservative ===
- Joe Anglin – interim leader of the Alberta Greens (2009), later joined the Wildrose Party in 2012 and was elected an MLA. Became in independent in 2014, and announced that he would seek the Progressive Conservative nomination in his riding in 2015.

=== Green to Liberal ===
- Jenica Atwin – Elected as MP for Fredericton in 2019, crossed the floor to the Liberal Party in 2021.
- Briony Penn – former long-time Green Party member, ran as Liberal candidate for Saanich-Gulf Islands in 2008.

=== Green to New Democratic ===
- Joe Keithley – elected in 2018 to Burnaby City Council as a member of the Burnaby Green Party. Switched to the Burnaby Citizens Association (a New Democratic Party affiliate) in 2025.
- Stuart Parker – former BC Green Party leader, later switched to the NDP.
- Joan Russow – former leader of the Green Party of Canada, 1997–2001. Joined NDP in September 2003.

=== Green to Parti Québécois/Bloc Québécois ===
- Scott McKay – former Parti vert du Québec leader, ran for the PQ in 2008 Quebec provincial election.
- Jean Ouimet – former Parti vert du Québec leader, later ran for PQ leadership.
- Jacques Rivard – former Deputy Leader of the Green Party of Canada.
- Pierre Nantel – former Green candidate who joined the PQ in 2021.

== Bloc/Parti Québécois ==
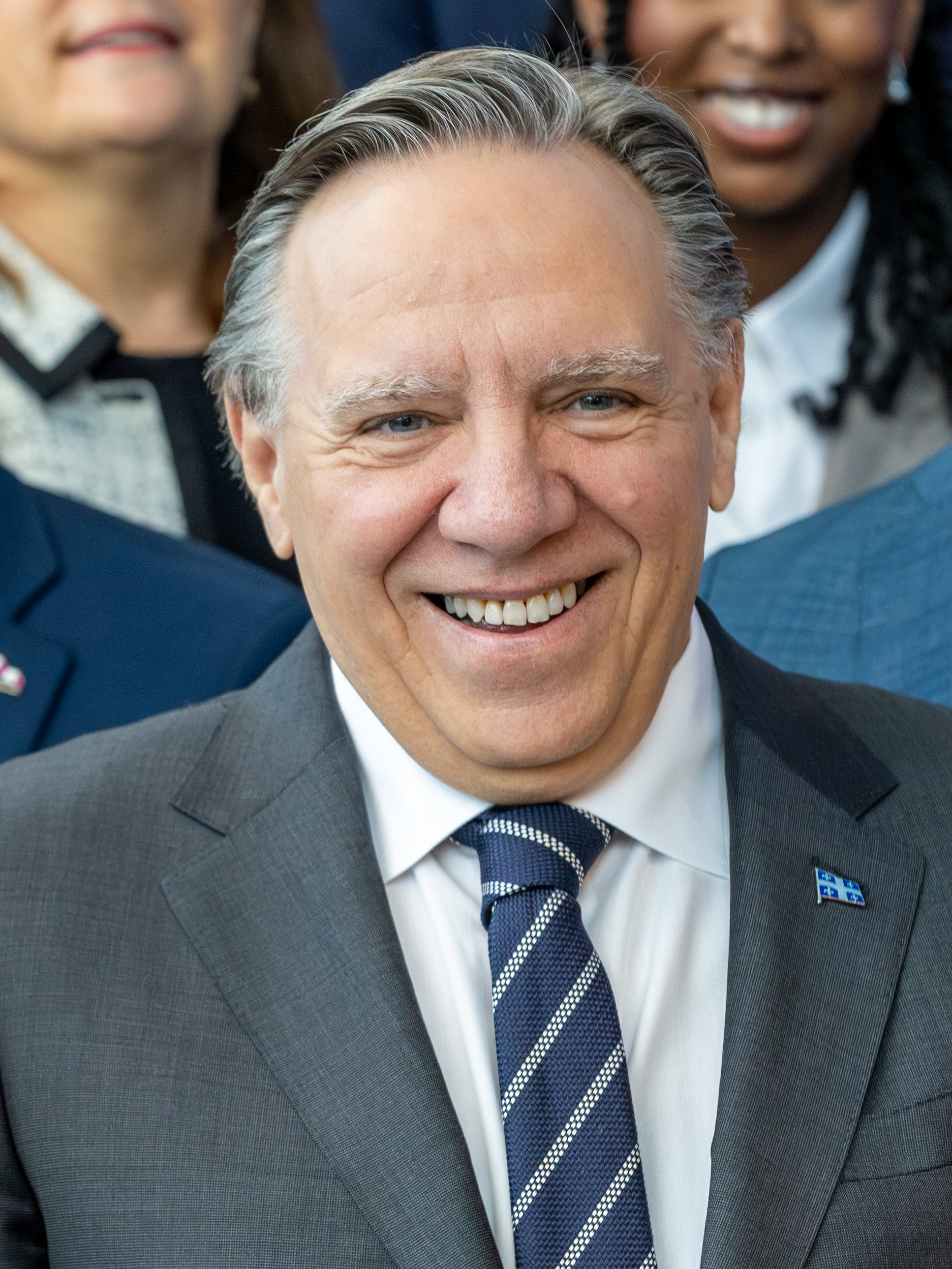
François Legault left the Parti Québécois and founded the Coalition Avenir Québec in 2011

=== Bloc/Parti Québécois to Liberal ===
- Robert Lanctôt – Bloc MP turned Liberal MP in 2003 and lost in 2004.
- Jean Lapierre – Liberal MP, who co-founded the Bloc Québécois and sat as a Bloc MP. He later rejoined the Liberal Party and served as a cabinet minister.
- Réjean Hébert – former Parti Québécois MNA and former provincial Minister of Health, ran unsuccessfully for the Liberal Party of Canada in the 2019 Canadian federal election in Longueuil—Saint-Hubert.
- Marc Tanguay – Quebec Liberal MNA who was previously a member of the PQ.

=== Bloc/Parti Québécois to Conservative ===
- Richard Bélisle – former Bloc MP, ran later for the Canadian Alliance and Conservatives.
- Pierre Brien – BQ MP, ran for the ADQ in 2003.
- Christine Fréchette – former PQ member, later joined the CAQ and became an MNA in 2022.
- Bernard Drainville – former PQ MNA and cabinet minister, joined the CAQ in 2022.
- Jean Landry – Bloc MP elected in 1993 for Lotbinere, he ran as an independent in 1997, losing. He ran as a Conservative in 2004, coming in 2nd (20,000 to 10,000). He is now a member of the NDP and was a delegate at their Quebec section council in 2011.
- Denis Lebel – former Bloc member, joined the Conservatives in 2007.
- Nic LeBlanc – PC MP 1984–1992 for Longueuil, than become Bloc MP 1992–1997. Ran for the Canadian Alliance in 2000 and the Conservatives in 2004.
- Michel Rivard – former Parti MNA, joined the Canadian Alliance under Stockwell Day, appointed to the Senate as a Conservative by Stephen Harper.
- Michel Gauthier – former Parti Québécois MNA, former Bloc Québécois MP and leader, joined the Conservative Party in 2018.
- François Legault – former Parti Québécois MNA and cabinet minister, founded the Coalition Avenir Québec in 2011 and became premier of Quebec in 2018.
- Daniel Ratthé – PQ MNA who joined the CAQ.
- Benoit Charette – PQ MNA who joined the CAQ.
- François Rebello – PQ MNA who joined the CAQ.
- Donald Martel – PQ member who joined the CAQ.
- Mario Laframboise – BQ MP who joined the CAQ.

=== Bloc/Parti Québécois to other/none ===
- André Bellavance – quits the party in 2014 to sit as an independent.
- Pierre Céré – former PQ leadership candidate, later joined the NDP.
- Jean-François Fortin – former interim parliamentary leader quits the party in 2014 to sit as an independent, subsequently forms and becomes leader of Strength in Democracy with Jean-François Larose.
- Amir Khadir – former BQ candidate, later Québec solidaire MNA and party co-spokesperson.
- Ghislain Lebel – former Bloc MP, left the party to set as an independent, voted for and offered himself as a candidate for the ADQ in the 2007 Quebec election, joined the Parti indépendantiste in 2008.
- Maria Mourani – Bloc MP for Ahuntsic is expelled from the party in 2013 for opposing the Quebec Charter of Values. After sitting as an Independent for a year, she becomes a member of the NDP, while continuing to sit as an Independent, and announces her intention to run as an NDP candidate in the next election.
- Martine Ouellet – former BQ leader and PQ MNA who founded Climat Québec in 2021.

== Other ==
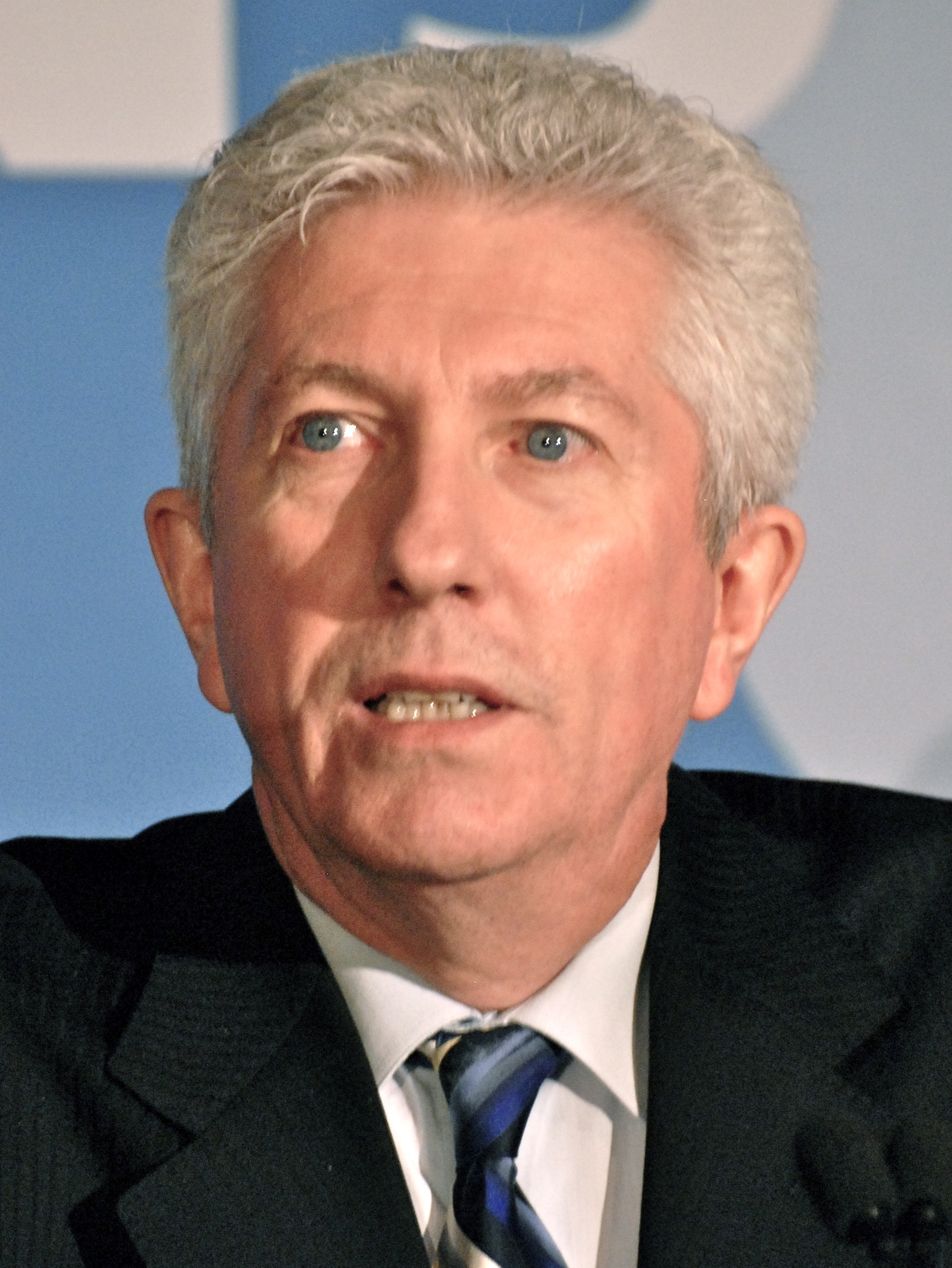
Gilles Duceppe later became leader of the Bloc Québécois

=== Other to Liberal ===
- Preston Elliott – Progressive MP, member of "Ginger Group" who joined the Liberals.
- Harry Nixon – UF/Progressive MPP in Ontario, joined the Ontario Liberal Party, briefly served as Premier.
- William John Ward – Progressive MP, member of "Ginger Group" who joined the Liberals.
- Marc-Boris St-Maurice – founder and leader of Marijuana Party of Canada, joined the Liberals in 2005.
- Armand Caouette – Social Credit MP in the 1970s, ran as a PC in the 1997 federal election, Liberal in the 2006 election.
- Marcel Lessard – Social Credit MP 1962–1963, elected as a Liberal in 1968.
- Harold Long – Social Credit BC MLA, later a BC Liberal MLA.
- Horace Andrew (Bud) Olson – Social Credit MP (1957–1958, 1962–1968), re-elected as a Liberal in 1968.
- Claude Richmond – Social Credit BC MLA, switched to the BC Liberals.

=== Other to Conservative ===
- John Bracken – Progressive Party Premier of Manitoba, because the federal Conservative leader after the party agreed to change the party name to Progressive Conservative.
- A. A. MacLeod – Labor-Progressive MPP in the Ontario legislature in the 1940s and 1950s. Subsequently, became an advisor to the Ontario Progressive Conservative Party.

=== Other to New Democratic ===
- Milton Neil Campbell – Progressive MP, part of the "Ginger Group" which played a major role in forming the CCF.
- George Gibson Coote – Alberta United Farmers (UF) MP, founding member of the CCF.
- Robert Gardiner – Progressive MP, part of the "Ginger Group" which played a major role in forming the CCF.
- Edward Joseph Garland- UF and Progressive MP, part of the "Ginger Group" which played a major role in forming the CCF.
- William Charles Good – Progressive MP, part of the "Ginger Group" which played a major role in forming the CCF.
- Donald MacBeth Kennedy – UF and Progressive MP, part of the "Ginger Group" which played a major role in forming the CCF.
- Agnes Macphail – one of the first elected female MPs, later joined CCF.
- Henry Elvins Spencer – UF MP, part of the "Ginger Group" which played a major role in forming the CCF.
- Dana Larsen – former BC Marijuana Party leader, ran for the NDP in 2008.
- Anne McGrath – former NDP party president, ran as a Communist Party candidate in the 1980s.
- Roland Penner – Labor-Progressive Party candidate as a youth in 1953. Was elected for the Manitoba NDP in 1980 and served as a provincial cabinet minister.
- Mathieu Ravignat – Communist Party-affiliated as an independent candidate in 1997, elected NDP MP for Pontiac in 2011.
- Paula Fletcher – Communist Party candidate in the 1980s, now an NDP affiliated city councillor in Toronto.
- Robert Laxer – Labour-Progressive Party organizer in the 1950s, left in 1956 and subsequently joined the New Democratic Party, becoming a leader of The Waffle tendency.
- Judy Darcy – former NDP candidate and head of CUPE, member of Workers' Communist Party in youth.
- René Matte – Ralliement Créditiste/Social Credit MP, later ran as an NDP candidate.

=== Other to Green ===
- Rafe Mair – former BC Social Credit MLA and now radio host. Now a Green Party supporter.

=== Other to Bloc/Parti Québécois ===
- Gilles Duceppe – former Bloc Québécois leader; was in the Workers' Communist Party (Marxist–Leninist) as a youth.
- Vincent Marissal – former QS MNA who joined the PQ.

=== Other to other/none ===
- Sol Zanetti – joined QS after its merger with Option nationale.
- Elmer Knutson – defeated Social Credit leadership candidate, founded Confederation of Regions Party.

== See also ==
- List of Canadian politicians who have crossed the floor
