= Light Path Notation =

3D rendering notation

The Light Path Notation is a notation used for ray tracing techniques in rendering. It specifies the type of light path from the light source to the virtual observer (eye), including reflections that may appear along the way. Different light path types are distinguished by the order in which they intersect diffuse or specular surfaces.

== Notation ==
Example for different light paths in a scene with global illumination. 1) LDSE, 2) LSSDE und 3) LDDE.

The light path notation was introduces 1990 by Paul Heckbert. It is based on regular expressions and uses the following symbols:

| L | is the light source, |
| D | is a diffuse surface, |
| S | is a specular surface (refractions included), |
| E | the eye (virtual observer). |

Furthermore, the following usual symbols of regular expressions also apply:

| | | or, |
| * | any number of reflections on the surface of the specified type, |
| + | at least one reflection, |
| ? | at most one reflection. |

The reason to differentiate between diffuse (D) and specular (S) surface hits is that they may require different techniques for correct handling. Depending on the rendering algorithm, only certain types of light paths can be simulated.

The easiest case of a diffuse surface is a surface that obeys Lambert's cosine law and the easiest case for a specular surface is a smooth dielectric, whose reflections or refraction coefficients can be calculated with the Fresnel equations. For general lighting models, which can include "glossy" reflections, the boundary between diffuse and specular is not clearly defined.

== Typical Light Paths ==
The light path notation can be used to express the capabilities of a rendering algorithm. Some examples are shown in the following table:

| Light path | Meaning | Examples of algorithms which can simulate these path kinds. |
|---|---|---|
| L(D|S)*E | All possible light paths: a lightpath can intersect with an arbitrary number of diffuse or specular surfaces. The simulation of all possible light paths corresponds to the global illumination. | Path tracing |
| LD*E | Possible diffuse interreflection (Path 3 shows an example) | Simple radiosity |
| LD?S*E | Eventual diffuse refection followed by an arbitrary amount of specular reflections (Path 1 shows an example). | Recursive ray tracing (Whitted) |
| LS+DE | Caustics (see path 2). These kinds of light path can not be simulated with classical algorithms (simple radiosity or ray tracing). | Caustic photon mapping |

== Expansion ==
Eric Veach expanded the light path notation in his dissertation, especially for E and L, so that the start and end point, as well as the quantity of incident/outgoing directions, can be specular or diffuse. With these expanded regular expressions it is possible to define different kinds of light sources (e.g. directional spotlight, point light or luminous sphere), as well as different camera types (e.g. pinhole camera or cameras with depth of field).
