= William Duncan Smith (politician) =

Canadian politician

Member of the Legislative Assembly of British Columbia
- In office 1945–1949
- Preceded by: William James Asselstine
- Succeeded by: Frank Arthur Calder
- Constituency: Atlin

Personal details
- Born: January 4, 1899 Edinburgh, Scotland
- Died: April 1, 1977 (aged 78) Vancouver, British Columbia
- Party: Coalition
- Spouse: Katherine Janet Watson
- Occupation: Electrician

William Duncan Smith (January 4, 1899 – April 1, 1977) was a Canadian politician. He served in the Legislative Assembly of British Columbia from 1945 to 1949 from the electoral district of Atlin, a member of the Coalition government.
