= Frank Calder (politician) =

Canadian politician (1915–2006)

Frank Arthur Calder OC OBC
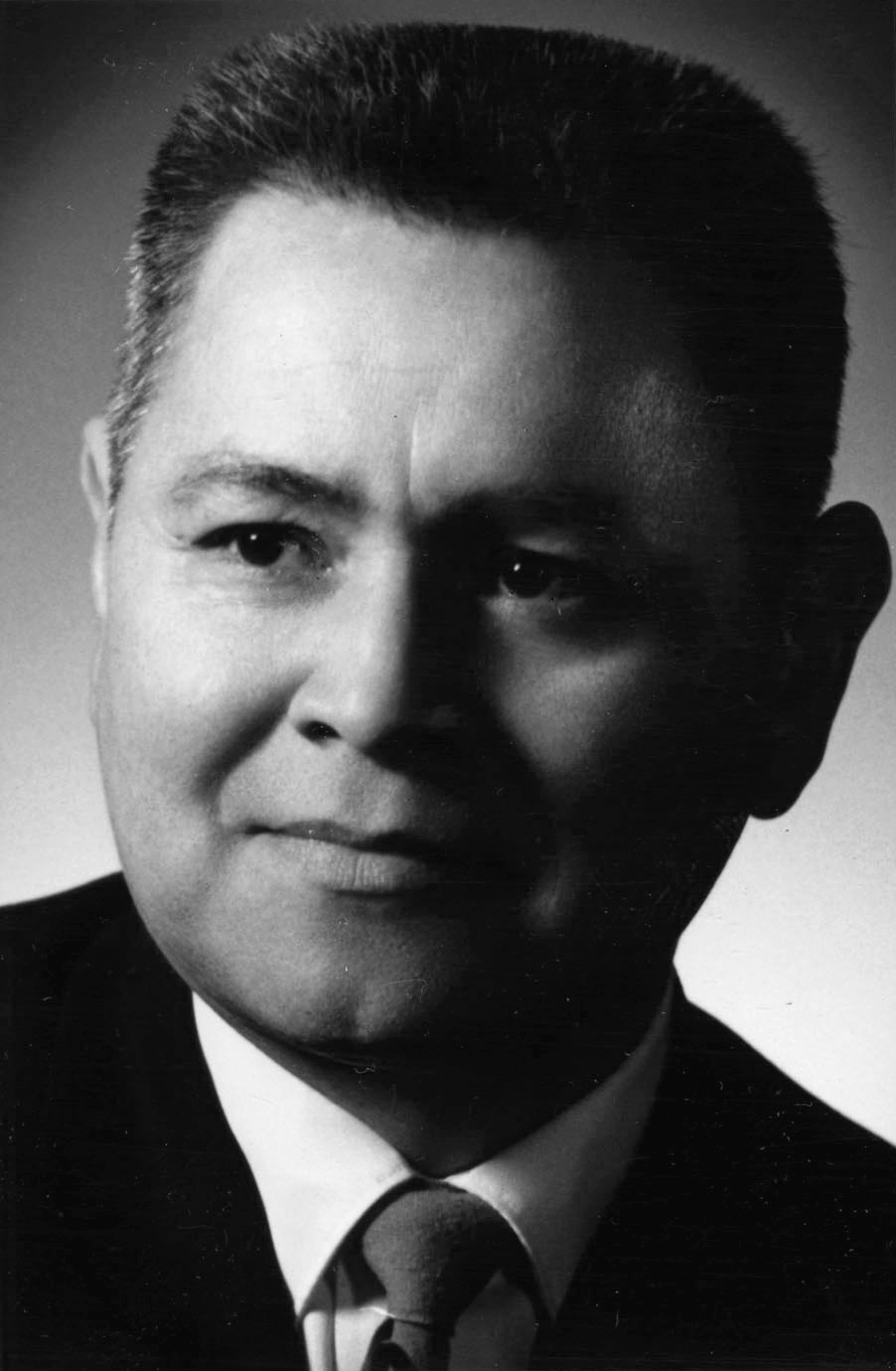
- Calder c. 1960

Member of the British Columbia Legislative Assembly for Atlin
- In office September 12, 1960 – May 10, 1979
- Preceded by: William James Asselstine
- Succeeded by: Al Passarell
- In office June 15, 1949 – September 19, 1956
- Preceded by: William Duncan Smith
- Succeeded by: William James Asselstine

Personal details
- Born: August 3, 1915 Nass Harbour, British Columbia, Canada
- Died: November 4, 2006 (aged 91) Victoria, British Columbia, Canada
- Party: New Democrat (1949–1975); Social Credit (1975–1979)
- Spouse: Tamaki Koshibe

Frank Arthur Calder, OC OBC (August 3, 1915 – November 4, 2006) was a Nisga'a politician in Canada.

Born in Nass Harbour, British Columbia, Calder was the first indigenous person to graduate from the Anglican Theological College of the University of British Columbia. Calder was a hereditary chief of the House of Wisinxbiltkw from the Killerwhale Tribe. He died November 4, 2006, at an assisted-living home in Victoria from the effects of cancer and recent abdominal surgery.

== Political career ==
In the 1949 British Columbia election, Calder was elected to the Legislative Assembly of British Columbia. He was elected in the riding of Atlin where he continued to serve until 1956 and then again between 1960 and 1979. Calder represented British Columbia's Co-operative Commonwealth Federation (which later became the New Democratic Party of British Columbia).

Calder was appointed a cabinet member in Dave Barrett's government in 1972 and became the first aboriginal cabinet minister in British Columbia (BC). In 1973, police found him in a consensual situation involving a female companion, alcohol and a car parked in an intersection. He was arrested but not charged and was fired from cabinet. In 1974, he was defeated by Joseph Gosnell in his bid to be re-elected as president of the Nisga'a Tribal Council.

In 1975, Calder crossed the floor to join the Social Credit Party of British Columbia and was re-elected. In 1979, however, Calder lost his seat to the NDP candidate, Al Passarell, by a single vote. Calder and his wife had both neglected to vote.

== Fighting for treaty rights ==
Calder is known for the court case titled Calder v British Columbia (AG), which was argued by Thomas Berger. By appealing the case all the way to the Supreme Court of Canada, Calder established that Aboriginal title exists in modern Canadian law. This decision had national and international reverberations. In addition, it was the basis of BC's Nisga'a Treaty.

Before the Calder case, there was no clear process for negotiating Canadian land claim settlements; the case outcome clarified which lands were negotiable (40% of Canada's land mass) and which were not. After the case, Canada developed a land claims policy to guide negotiations. Calder continued to fight for Nisga'a's treaty rights as recently as 2000.

Calder founded the Nisga'a Tribal Council, the first tribal council established in BC. Calder was its president for 21 years until 1974.

== Honours ==
- 1987 – Made an Officer of the Order of Canada
- Awarded the Aboriginal Order of Canada
- 1996 – National Aboriginal Achievement Award
- 2004 – Awarded the Order of British Columbia
