= Larry Guno =

Canadian lawyer, playwright and politician

Larry Guno MLA
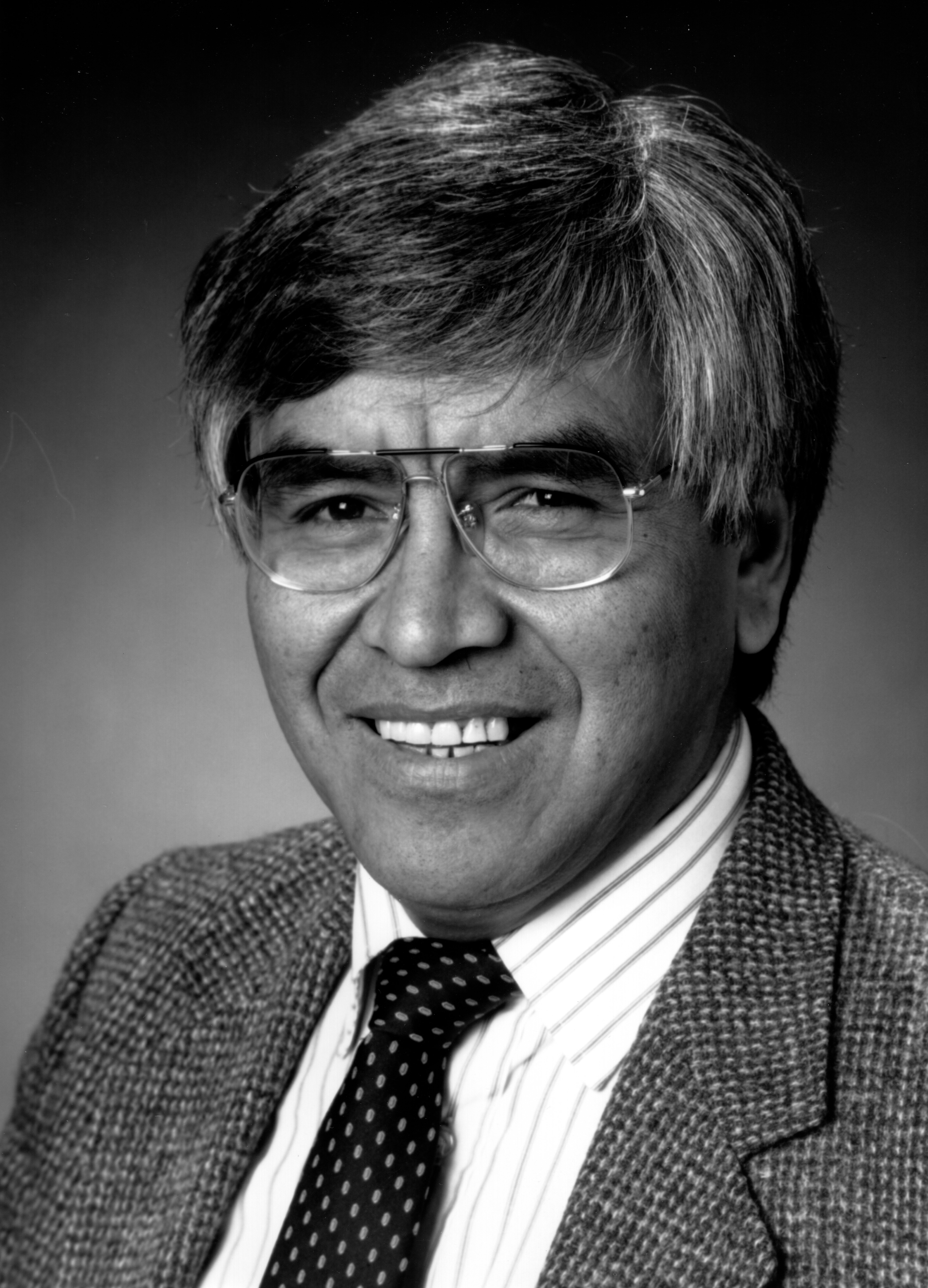

MLA for Atlin
- In office 1986–1991
- Preceded by: Al Passarell
- Succeeded by: Riding merged into Bulkley Valley-Stikine

Personal details
- Born: February 28, 1940 Aiyansh, British Columbia
- Died: July 17, 2005 (aged 65)
- Party: New Democrat
- Occupation: lawyer, playwright

Larry Edward Guno (February 28, 1940 – July 17, 2005) was a lawyer, playwright and political figure in British Columbia. He represented Atlin in the Legislative Assembly of British Columbia from 1986 to 1991 as a New Democratic Party (NDP) member.

He was born in Aiyansh, British Columbia in 1940, the son of Augustus Guno and a member of the Nisga'a nation. Guno was educated at Simon Fraser University and the University of British Columbia. In 2000, he was an unsuccessful candidate in the federal riding of Skeena. He wrote the play Bunk #7 based on his experiences at a residential school. In 2005, Guno died at his home in Terrace at the age of 65.
