= Herbert Frederick Kergin =

Canadian politician

Herbert Frederick Kergin (July 8, 1885 – August 28, 1954) was a master mariner and political figure in British Columbia. He represented Atlin from 1920 to 1933 in the Legislative Assembly of British Columbia as Liberal.

He was born in St. Catharines, Ontario, the son of William Henry Kergin and Margaret Emmet, and was educated there, in Toronto and at Victoria University. In 1910, Kergin married Achsah Frances McCoskrie. He was defeated by William James Asselstine when he ran for reelection in 1933 as an independent candidate. Kergin died in New Westminster at the age of 68.
