= Rainforest Trust =

US-based nonprofit organization

- Formation: December 8, 1988; 37 years ago
- Founded at: New York
- Headquarters: Warrenton, Virginia, United States
- Board of directors: Bernie Tershy (Board Chairman) Dr. Cullen Geiselman (Board Vice-Chair)
- Key people: Dr. James C. Deutsch (CEO)
- Revenue: $46 million (2023)
- Expenses: $34 million (2023)
- Website: www.rainforesttrust.org
- Formerly called: World Parks Endowment; World Land Trust-US

Rainforest Trust is a US-based nonprofit environmental organization focused on protecting tropical and subtropical natural areas to conserve threatened species, stop deforestation, slow climate change and support Indigenous and local communities in their conservation efforts. Rainforest Trust supports protection of the world’s most vulnerable, intact rainforest habitats through strategic partnerships in Africa, the Caribbean, Latin America, and the Asia-Pacific region.

== History ==
Founded in 1988, Rainforest Trust was originally known as World Parks Endowment. In 2006, World Parks Endowment affiliated with UK-based World Land Trust and became World Land Trust-US. This minimized operating costs and allowed donated funds to directly impact habitat conservation projects on the ground.

On September 16, 2013, the World Land Trust-US rebranded and changed its name to Rainforest Trust. This transition acknowledged the significance of tropical and subtropical rainforests within the organization’s vision of land and species preservation.

== Approach ==
Rainforests are important for biodiversity and carbon capture, but they are at high risk from deforestation, extraction, and climate change. 95% of global forest loss occurs in the tropics, primarily due to agriculture, ranching, logging, and mining.

Rainforest Trust supports the protection of the most threatened rainforests by working with partners to: seek official designations like national parks, wildlife reserves, and community forests; support Indigenous land tenure and management rights; and support private land purchases. The organization sustains long-term conservation by providing training and equipment to local partners for environmental monitoring and stewardship.^{2}

By 2025, Rainforest Trust projects helped protect more than 50 million acres and conserved habitats for nearly 3,000 threatened species. 99% of the rainforests protected remain standing, monitored through real-time satellite data on tree cover.

Rainforest Trust’s mission to protect natural lands and species aligns directly with 30 by 30, a worldwide initiative by governments to designate 30% of Earth's lands and oceans as protected areas by 2030. In 2021, Rainforest Trust was a founding member of Protecting Our Planet, a $5 billion collective pledge and the largest-ever private funding commitment for biodiversity, announced at the COP26 UN Climate Change Conference (2021 United Nations Climate Change Conference).

Rainforest Trust receives the highest rating from philanthropic watchdog Charity Navigator, which awarded the organization a 4-star rating and 100% score.

== Leadership ==
Byron Swift was the CEO of the organization from its founding in 1988 until 2012, when Dr. Paul Salaman became the CEO. In 2020, Dr. James C. Deutsch became the CEO. President Emeriti include leading conservation biologists Dr. E.O. Wilson and Dr. Thomas Lovejoy; renowned neotropical ornithologist Robert S. Ridgely; Dr. Eric Veach, environmental advocate and computer graphics pioneer; and philanthropist and advocate Sally F. Davidson.
