= Atlin (electoral district) =

Defunct provincial electoral district in British Columbia, Canada

Atlin was a provincial electoral district in British Columbia, Canada. It made its first appearance on the hustings in the 10th provincial general election in 1903 and last appeared in the 34th provincial general election in 1986, after which it was merged with the Skeena riding and was succeeded by Bulkley Valley-Stikine.

== Geography ==
Always one of the province's largest ridings by area, it was always among the smallest in population, and is often cited as an example of a lack of proper representation-by-population in the BC political system. From the perspective of riding residents, who are spread out in a handful of small settlements from the Nass River to the Yukon border, a riding incorporating larger population centres was unfair to them. Ultimately the pressure to redress lack of equality in voting-weight among BC ridings saw the Atlin riding being merged with Skeena riding.

=== First Nations ===
An important factor in the Atlin riding was the dominance of its First Nations population, including the whole of the Nisga'a Nation (Frank Calder and Larry Guno were both Nisga'a). Also in the riding in its entirety was the Tahltan Nation, centred on the isolated towns of Telegraph Creek and Dease Lake. The area of the town of Atlin is part of the Inland Tlingit Nation.

=== Towns and industry ===
A factor in the riding was the dominance of working men in its handful of industrial towns (principally mining).

The main towns in the riding were:

- Atlin
- Teslin
- Dease Lake
- Telegraph Creek
- Anyox (now a ghost town, formerly a large smelter town)
- Stewart

== Members of the Legislative Assembly ==
The most notable member of the Legislative Assembly from Atlin was Frank Calder. A Nisga'a, he originally ran for the CCF, and then the NDP, but in the 1975 election he switched sides to Social Credit, but went down to defeat under that party's banner in 1979 and retired from electoral politics.

== Electoral history ==
Due to its small electorate, battles over spoiled ballots were critical in Atlin's electoral history:

- The 1928 election saw a 567/542/32 three-way split in favour of Herbert Frederick Kergin of the BC Liberal Party, with 22 rejected ballots
- The 1945 election saw a 297/292 split in favour of William Duncan Smith of the Liberal-Conservative Coalition, with no rejected ballots
- The 1949 election saw a 376/370 split in favour of Frank Calder, then a candidate for the Co-operative Commonwealth Federation (CCF) - with 190 rejected ballots.
- The 1956 election saw a 450/360/131 split in favour of William James Asselstine of the Social Credit, with 59 rejected ballots.
- the 1979 election saw a 750/749 split in favour of Al Passarell of the New Democratic Party over Frank Calder, who had switched sides to Social Credit in the 1975 British Columbia general election — with 39 rejected ballots

Note: Winners of each election are in bold.

10th British Columbia election, 1903
Party	Candidate	Votes	%	±	Expenditures
Liberal	John Kirkland	202	46.12%	–	unknown
Conservative	**Henry Essen Young**	**236**	**53.88%**		unknown
Total valid votes		438	100.00%		
Total rejected ballots					
Turnout		%			

11th British Columbia election, 1907
Party	Candidate	Votes	%	±	Expenditures
Liberal	John Irving	46	37.10%	–	unknown
Conservative	**Henry Essen Young**	**78**	**62.90%**		unknown
Total valid votes		124	100.00%		
Total rejected ballots					
Turnout		%			

12th British Columbia election, 1909
Party	Candidate	Votes	%	±	Expenditures
Liberal	John Irving	65	37.79%	–	unknown
Conservative	**Henry Essen Young**	**107**	**62.21%**		unknown
Total valid votes		172	100.00%		
Total rejected ballots					
Turnout		%			

13th British Columbia election, 1912
Party	Candidate	Votes	%	±	Expenditures
Conservative	**Henry Essen Young (acclamation)**	**n/a**	%		unknown
Total valid votes		-	--.--%		
Total rejected ballots					
Turnout		%			

14th British Columbia election, 1916
Party	Candidate	Votes	%	±	Expenditures
Conservative	William X. McDonald	277	45.71%		unknown
Liberal	**Frank Harry Mobley**	**329**	**54.29%**		unknown
Total valid votes		606	100.00%		
Total rejected ballots					
Turnout		%			

1920 British Columbia general election
Party	Candidate	Votes	%
Liberal	Herbert Frederick Kergin	390	36.69
Federated Labour	George Bernard Casey	300	28.22
Conservative	William Cameron Ross	229	21.542
Independent	Harold Randolph King	86	8.09
Independent Labour	Patrick Daly	30	2.8
Independent	Oakley Beauport Bush	28	2.63
Total valid votes		1,063	100.00

16th British Columbia election, 1924
Party	Candidate	Votes	%	±	Expenditures
Provincial	Robert Armour	380	31.77%	–	unknown
Conservative	Edmund John Conway	353	29.52%		unknown
Liberal	**Herbert Frederick Kergin**	**463**	**38.71%**		unknown
Total valid votes		1,196	100.00%		
Total rejected ballots					
Turnout		%			

17th British Columbia election, 1928
Party	Candidate	Votes	%	±	Expenditures
Conservative	Thomas Wilbert Falconer	542	46.68%		unknown
Liberal	**Herbert Frederick Kergin**	**567**	**50.56%**		unknown
Independent	William Herbert Moult	32	2.76%		unknown
Total valid votes		1,161	100.00%		
Total rejected ballots		22			
Turnout		%			

18th British Columbia election, 1933
Party	Candidate	Votes	%	±	Expenditures
Liberal	**William James Asselstine**	**419**	**32.63%**		unknown
Independent Conservative	Thomas Wilbert Falconer	136	10.59%		
Independent	Herbert Frederick Kergin	267	20.79%		unknown
Total valid votes		1,284	100.00%		
Total rejected ballots		34			
Turnout		%			

19th British Columbia election, 1937
Party	Candidate	Votes	%	±	Expenditures
Liberal	**William James Asselstine**	**562**	**54.46%**		unknown
Co-operative Commonwealth	Charles H. Lake	263	25.53%		unknown
Conservative	Ernest Love	205	19.90%		unknown
Total valid votes		1,030	100.00%		
Total rejected ballots		31			
Turnout		%			

20th British Columbia election, 1941
Party	Candidate	Votes	%	±	Expenditures
Liberal	**William James Asselstine**	**454**	**54.83%**		unknown
Labour	John Scott	374	45.17%		unknown
Total valid votes		828	100.00%		
Total rejected ballots		24			
Turnout		%			

21st British Columbia election, 1945
Party	Candidate	Votes	%	±	Expenditures
Co-operative Commonwealth Fed.	Norman Cunningham	292	49.58%		
Coalition	**William Duncan Smith**	**297**	**50.42%**		
Total valid votes		589	100.00%		
Total rejected ballots		0			

22nd British Columbia election, 1949
Party	Candidate	Votes	%	±	Expenditures
**Co-operative Commonwealth Fed.**	**Frank Arthur Calder**	**376**	**50.40%**		
Coalition	William Duncan Smith	370	49.60%		
Total valid votes		746	100.00%		
Total rejected ballots		190			
Turnout		%			

23rd British Columbia election, 1952^{1}
Party	Candidate	Votes 1st count	%	Votes final count	%	±%	
**Co-operative Commonwealth Fed.**	**Frank Arthur Calder**	**595**	**56.61%**	**595**	**56.61%**		unknown
Progressive Conservative	Thomas Sutherland MacKay	164	15.60%	164	15.60%		unknown
Liberal	William Duncan Smith	292	27.78%	292	27.78%		unknown
Total valid votes		1,051	100.00%	1,051	%		
Total rejected ballots		44					
Turnout		%					
^{1} preferential ballot - only 1 count needed

24th British Columbia election, 1953 ^{2}
Party	Candidate	Votes 1st count	%	Votes final count	%	±%	
Social Credit	Frank Assu	108	11.54%	108	11.54%		
**Co-operative Commonwealth Fed.**	**Frank Arthur Calder**	**553**	**59.08%**	**553**	**59.08%**		unknown
Liberal	William Duncan Smith	275	29.38%	275	29.38%		unknown
Total valid votes		936	100.00%	936	%		
Total rejected ballots		125					
Total Registered Voters		5,933 (1952 list)					
Turnout		%					
Preferential ballot; only one count needed

25th British Columbia election, 1956
Party	Candidate	Votes	%	±	Expenditures
Social Credit	**William James Asselstine**	**454**	**48.04%**	–	unknown
Co-operative Commonwealth Fed.	Frank Arthur Calder	360	38.10%		unknown
Liberal	George Douglas Frizzell	131	13.86%	–	unknown
Total valid votes		945	100.00%		
Total rejected ballots		59			
Turnout		%			

26th British Columbia election, 1960
Party	Candidate	Votes	%	±	Expenditures
Social Credit	William James Asselstine	267	32.05%	–	unknown
Conservative	Charles Jewell Brown	122	14.65%		unknown
**Co-operative Commonwealth Fed.**	**Frank Arthur Calder**	**444**	**53.30%**		unknown
Total valid votes		833	100.00%		
Total rejected ballots		85			
Turnout		%			

27th British Columbia election, 1963
Party	Candidate	Votes	%	±	Expenditures
Social Credit	William James Asselstine	308	30.56%	–	unknown
New Democratic	**Frank Arthur Calder**	**549**	**54.46%**		unknown
Liberal	Cyril Felix Dopson	444	53.30%	–	unknown
Total valid votes		1,008	100.00%		
Total rejected ballots		19			
Turnout		%			

28th British Columbia election, 1966
Party	Candidate	Votes	%	±	Expenditures
New Democratic	**Frank Arthur Calder**	**572**	**59.71%**		unknown
Liberal	Robin Roy Datziel	125	13.05%	–	unknown
Social Credit	Kirkwood, Thomas James	271	27.24%	–	unknown
Total valid votes		958	100.00%		
Total rejected ballots		10			
Turnout		%			

29th British Columbia election, 1969
Party	Candidate	Votes	%	±	Expenditures
New Democratic	**Frank Arthur Calder**	**639**	**53.12%**		unknown
Social Credit	Peter John Curran	230	19.12%	–	unknown
Liberal	Basil Edward Studer	334	27.76%	–	unknown
Total valid votes		1,203	100.00%		
Total rejected ballots		13			
Turnout		%			

30th British Columbia election, 1972
Party	Candidate	Votes	%	±	Expenditures
Social Credit	John Norman Anderson	245	14.88%	–	unknown
New Democratic	**Frank Arthur Calder**	**675**	**40.98%**		unknown
Progressive Conservative	Glen Leslie Clayton	65	3.95%		unknown
Independent	Peter John Curran	242	14.69%		unknown
Liberal	Basil Edward Studer	242	14.69%	–	unknown
Total valid votes		1,467	100.00%		
Total rejected ballots		27			
Turnout		%			

31st British Columbia election, 1975
Party	Candidate	Votes	%	±	Expenditures
Social Credit	**Frank Arthur Calder**	**984**	**55.50%**	–	unknown
Liberal	Peter John Curran	292	16.47%	–	unknown
New Democratic	Gordon Steidl	497	28.03%		unknown
Total valid votes		1,773	100.00%		
Total rejected ballots		22			
Turnout		%			

32nd British Columbia election, 1979
Party	Candidate	Votes	%	±	Expenditures
Social Credit	Frank Arthur Calder	749	49.97%	–	unknown
New Democratic	**Al Passarell**	**750**	**50.03%**		unknown
Total valid votes		1,499	100.00%		
Total rejected ballots		39			
Turnout		%			

33rd British Columbia election, 1983
Party	Candidate	Votes	%	±	Expenditures
Social Credit	Robert Edmund Allen (Bobby) Ball	1,208	40.48%	–	unknown
Independent	Paul Danny Brohman	84	2.82%		unknown
Independent	Burgess A. Longson	105	3.52%		unknown
New Democratic	**Al Passarell**	**1,587**	**53.18%**		unknown
Total valid votes		2,984	70.76%		
Total rejected ballots		393			
Turnout		%			

34th British Columbia election, 1986
Party	Candidate	Votes	%	±	Expenditures
Social Credit	Andrew (Andy) Burton	858	37.29%	–	unknown
New Democratic	**Larry Guno**	**1,443**	**62.71%**		unknown
Total valid votes		2,301	100.00%		
Total rejected ballots		31			
Turnout		%			

== See also ==
- List of British Columbia provincial electoral districts
- Canadian provincial electoral districts
