= Henry Esson Young =

Canadian politician

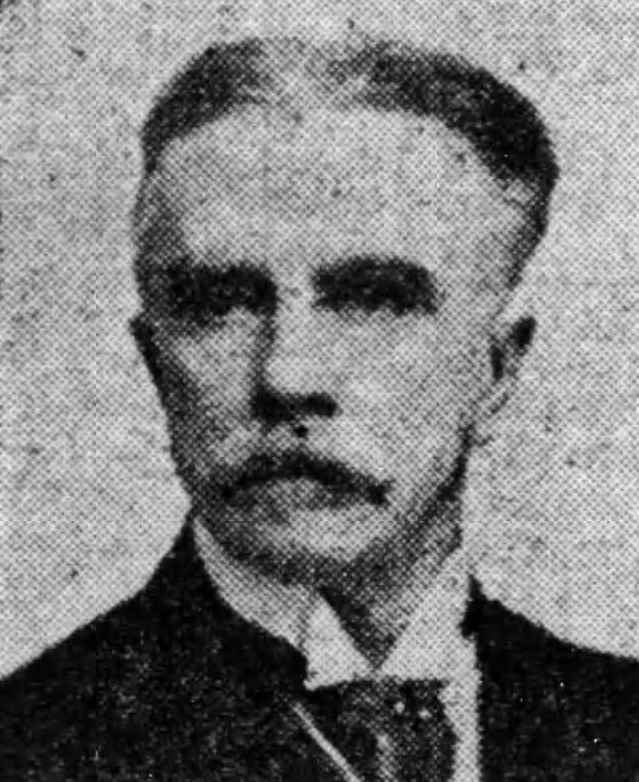

Member of the Legislative Assembly of British Columbia
- In office 1903–1915
- Constituency: Atlin

Personal details
- Born: February 24, 1862 English River, Canada East
- Died: October 24, 1939 (aged 77) Victoria, British Columbia
- Party: Conservative
- Spouse: Rosalind Watson (m. 1904)
- Education: Queen's University; McGill University; University of Toronto; University of Pennsylvania
- Occupation: Physician, politician

Henry Esson Young (February 24, 1862 – October 24, 1939) was a physician and political figure in British Columbia. Some sources list his birth year as 1867. He represented Atlin in the Legislative Assembly of British Columbia from 1903 to 1915 as a Conservative.

He was born in English River, Canada East in 1862, the son of Reverend Alexander Young and Ellen (née McBain), and was educated at Queen's University, McGill University, Toronto University and University of Pennsylvania. After receiving his medical degree he worked under William Osler in Montreal. He then continued his post-graduate studies in England. Young moved to Atlin, British Columbia, where he practised medicine from 1901 to 1903. In 1904, he married his second wife, Rosalind Watson. Between February 1907 and December 1915, Young served in the provincial cabinet as Minister of Education and Provincial Secretary. He helped establish the University of British Columbia in 1908. Young served as Secretary of the Provincial Board of Health from 1915 until his death in 1939 at Victoria at the age of 77.

The neighbourhood of Essondale was named in his honour. At one time, Riverview Hospital in Coquitlam was known as Essondale Hospital; Young played an important role in establishing the facility.
