= Nisga'a Tribal Council =

Former governing body of the Nisga'a people

The Nisga'a Tribal Council was the governing coalition of the band governments of the Nisga'a people. It was replaced by the Nisga'a Lisims Government as a result of the signing of the Nisga'a Treaty with Canada and British Columbia.

== See also ==
- Nisga'a
- Nisga'a Lisims Government
