= Eric Veach =

Canadian computer scientist

- Education: University of Waterloo (B. Math, 1990); Stanford University (PhD, 1997)
- Occupation: Computer scientist
- Known for: Work on Computer Graphics which won him two technical academy awards
- Relatives: Frank Harry Mobley (granduncle)

Eric Veach is a Canadian computer scientist known for his research on improvements to Monte Carlo sampling in Computer Graphics, which won him two technical academy awards.

== Education and career ==
Veach obtained a Bachelor of Mathematics degree in 1990 at the University of Waterloo. In 1997, he graduated with a PhD from Stanford University. His thesis is titled Robust Monte Carlo Methods for Light Transport Simulation, a highly cited paper in Computer Graphics.

After graduating from Stanford, Veach worked for Pixar from 1998 to 2000, collaborating with colleague Tom Lokovic to create realistic hair for animated movie Monsters, Inc.. They also published a paper titled Deep Shadow Maps, which won them an academy award in 2014. He joined Google in 2000, where he was the technical leader for AdWords and AdSense and contributed to route-planning algorithms in Google Maps. He is also the primary developer of Google's S2 geometry library for geohashing.

In 2008, the University of Waterloo awarded him a J. W. Graham Medal, an annual award granted to a distinguished alumnus who had studied computer science there.

Veach won a 2014 Academy Scientific and Engineering Award for "foundational research on efficient Monte Carlo path tracing for image synthesis", especially on multiple importance sampling, described in his 1997 thesis. He also won a 2014 Academy Award for Technical Achievement together with Thomas Lokovic for contributions to deep shadowing technologies. Veach told CTV News he hadn't done any work in computer graphics for 15 years, but was pleasantly surprised to see his old works gain recognition.

== Personal life ==
Veach is a strong believer in environmental causes and serves as the chair of the Rainforest Trust board.

Journalist Farhad Manjoo mentioned Veach and two of his non-American colleagues at Google in an article titled "Why Silicon Valley Wouldn't Work Without Immigrants". Manjoo's article attempted to explain why newly inaugurated President Donald Trump's attempts to squeeze off the flow of immigrants to the US was dangerous. He argued that America disproportionately benefits from allowing foreigners like Veach to work in the US.
