= Al Passarell =

Canadian politician (1950–1986)

Al Passarell MLA
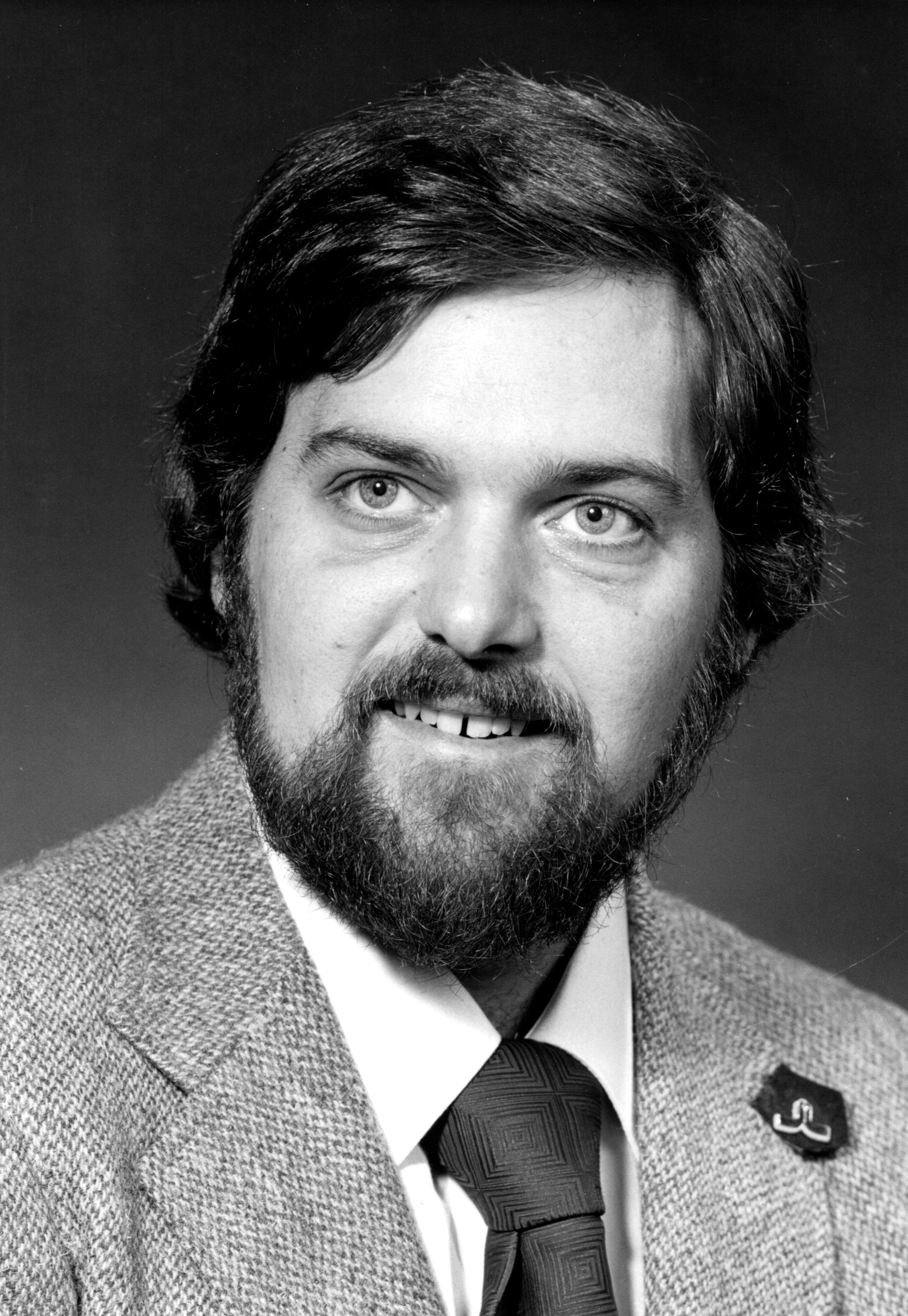

MLA for Atlin
- In office 1979–1986
- Preceded by: Frank Arthur Calder
- Succeeded by: Larry Guno

Personal details
- Born: April 22, 1950 Detroit, Michigan
- Died: September 27, 1986 (aged 36) Dease Lake, British Columbia
- Party: New Democrat, British Columbia Social Credit Party
- Spouse: Ruth Passarell
- Occupation: school teacher

Alan Lawrence Passarell (April 22, 1950 – September 29, 1986) was a Canadian politician who served as a Member of the Legislative Assembly of British Columbia representing the riding of Atlin from 1979 to 1986. He was in the New Democratic Party until October 1985, when he switched to the British Columbia Social Credit Party.

Passarell lived in a log cabin without a telephone. Before becoming a politician, he was a school principal. In 1979, he won his seat by one vote, and was subsequently known as "Landslide Al". As a MLA, he was known for advocating positions for Northern British Columbia. He garnered headlines for his tall tale about fighting a grizzly bear.

Passarell died when a plane he was on crashed into Dease Lake.
