= William James Asselstine =

Canadian politician (1891–1973)

William James Asselstine (July 1, 1891 – August 21, 1973) was an engineer, gold miner and political figure in British Columbia. He represented Atlin from 1933 to 1945 as a Liberal and from 1956 to 1960 as a Social Credit member in the Legislative Assembly of British Columbia.

He was born in Renfrew, Ontario in 1891, the son of Samuel Asselstine and Jessie Wilson, and was educated in Verona and Sydenham. In 1906, he married a Miss Ida Carr. He was a member of the Canadian Expeditionary Force during World War I. Asselstine served in the provincial cabinet as Minister of Mines, Minister of Trade and Industry and Minister of Labour. He ran unsuccessfully for reelection in 1960 and 1963 as a Social Credit member. He died August 21, 1973, aged 82.
