= New Democratic Party candidates in the 2000 Canadian federal election =

This is a list of New Democratic Party candidates in the 2000 federal election. The NDP ran candidates in 298 of the 301 ridings, 13 of whom were elected. Following the election, the NDP remained the fourth-largest party in the House of Commons of Canada.

== Alberta ==
=== Calgary ===
Riding	Candidate's Name	Notes	Residence	Occupation	Votes	%	Rank
Calgary Centre	Don LePan	CEO of Broadview Press (1985–present)	Calgary	Publisher / Author	1,604	2.80	4th
Calgary East	Kaie Jones	NDP candidate for Calgary East in the 1997 federal election	Calgary	Grocer	1,444	4.32	4th
Calgary Northeast	H. Ken Sahil		Calgary	Engineer	1,852	4.10	4th
Calgary—Nose Hill	Jon Adams		Calgary	Teacher	2,227	3.73	4th
Calgary Southeast	Giorgio Cattabeni		Calgary	Clerk	1,111	2.04	4th
Calgary Southwest	Jennifer Stewart		Calgary	Student	2,113	3.97	4th
Calgary West	Greg Klassen		Calgary	Student	2,350	3.82	4th

=== Edmonton ===
Riding	Candidate's Name	Notes	Residence	Occupation	Votes	%	Rank
Edmonton Centre-East	Ray Martin	Leader of the Alberta New Democratic Party (1984–1994); Member of the Legislative Assembly of Alberta for Edmonton-Norwood (1982–1993)	Edmonton	Teacher	7,304	17.44	3rd
Edmonton North	Laurie Lang		Edmonton	Nurse	3,216	7.47	3rd
Edmonton Southeast	Joginder Kandola		Edmonton	Lawyer	1,285	3.10	4th
Edmonton Southwest	Bernie Keeler	President of the Alberta Teachers' Association (1967–1968)	Edmonton	Teacher	2,746	5.12	4th
Edmonton—Strathcona	Hélène Narayana		Edmonton		8,256	14.78	3rd
Edmonton West	Richard D. Vanderberg	NDP candidate for Edmonton Southwest in the 1997 federal election ANDP candidate for Edmonton-McClung in the 1997 Alberta provincial election NDP candidate for Calgary West in the 1988 federal election	Edmonton	Professor at MacEwan University	2,895	5.83	4th
St. Albert	John Williams	NDP candidate for Lakeland in the 1997 federal election	Edmonton	Teacher	2,965	5.39	4th

=== Rural Alberta ===
Riding	Candidate's Name	Notes	Residence	Occupation	Votes	%	Rank
Athabasca	Alysia Erickson		Edmonton	Student	872	2.53	4th
Crowfoot	Jay Russell		Wheatland County		1,457	3.04	5th
Elk Island	Chris Harwood		Edmonton		3,316	6.31	4th
Lakeland	Raymond Stone		Innisfree	Farmer	2,069	4.61	4th
Lethbridge	Garth Hardy		Lethbridge	Student	2,648	5.75	4th
Macleod	Dwayne Good Striker	NDP candidate for Edmonton West in the 1997 federal election	Edmonton		2,945	6.70	4th
Medicine Hat	Luke Lacasse		Medicine Hat		2,153	5.14	4th
Peace River	Patricia Lawrence		Sexsmith		2,914	6.95	4th
Red Deer	Linda Roth		Bentley	Teacher	2,346	4.61	4th
Wetaskiwin	Cliff Reid	NDP candidate for Wetaskiwin in the 1997 federal election	Leduc	Small business owner	2,045	4.22	4th
Wild Rose	Anne Wilson	NDP candidate for Wild Rose in the 1997 federal election	Canmore	Gardener	2,320	4.06	4th
Yellowhead	J. Noel Lapierre	Member of Hinton Town Council (1978–1983)	Hinton	Millwright	1,910	4.71	4th

== British Columbia ==
=== British Columbia Interior ===
Riding	Candidate's Name	Notes	Residence	Occupation	Votes	%	Rank
Cariboo—Chilcotin	Raymond John Skelly		100 Mile House	Teacher	2,915	9.05	3rd
Kamloops, Thompson and Highland Valleys	Nelson Riis	Member of Parliament for Kamloops (1988–2000) and Kamloops—Shuswap (1980–1988); Member of Kamloops City Council (1978–1980)	Kamloops	Professor at Cariboo College	13,600	28.03	2nd
Kelowna	John O. Powell		Kelowna		3,572	6.28	4th
Kootenay—Boundary—Okanagan	Don Scarlett		Kaslo	Electrician	4,091	9.85	3rd
Kootenay—Columbia	Andrea Dunlop		Windermere	Teacher	3,297	8.71	3rd
Okanagan—Coquihalla	Ken Ellis		Merritt	Teacher	4,096	8.45	3rd
Okanagan—Shuswap	Wayne Alexander Fowler		Armstrong	Teacher	4,060	8.48	3rd
Prince George—Bulkley Valley	Mark Walsh		Victoria	Student	2,029	5.80	4th
Prince George—Peace River	Lenart Nelson		Prince George		1,597	4.66	4th
Skeena	Larry Guno	Member of the Legislative Assembly of British Columbia for Atlin (1986–1991)	Terrace	Lawyer	6,273	20.96	3rd

=== Fraser Valley/Lower Mainland ===
Riding	Candidate's Name	Notes	Residence	Occupation	Votes	%	Rank
Burnaby—Douglas	Svend Robinson	Member of Parliament for Burnaby—Douglas (1997–2004), Burnaby—Kingsway (1988–1997), and Burnaby (1979–1988)	Burnaby	Lawyer	17,018	37.39	1st
Delta—South Richmond	Ernie Fulton		Delta	Electrician	3,060	5.63	4th
Dewdney—Alouette	Malcolm James Crockett	NDP candidate for Dewdney—Alouette in the 1997 federal election	Maple Ridge	Social worker	5,535	11.47	4th
Fraser Valley	Rob Lees	NDP candidate for Fraser Valley in the 1997 federal election	Chilliwack	Psychologist	3,185	5.79	3rd
Langley—Abbotsford	Paul Latham	NDP candidate for Langley—Abbotsford in the 1997 federal election	Abbotsford		2,353	4.25	4th
New Westminster—Coquitlam—Burnaby	Lorrie Williams		New Westminster		7,076	15.03	3rd
North Vancouver	Sam Schechter		North Vancouver	Executive assistant	2,760	4.93	4th
Port Moody—Coquitlam—Port Coquitlam	Jamie Arden		Port Coquitlam	Civil servant	5,340	9.27	3rd
Richmond	Gail Paquette	BC NDP candidate for Richmond-Steveston in the 1996 British Columbia provincial election	Richmond	Communications worker	2,695	5.68	3rd
South Surrey—White Rock—Langley	Matt Todd		Surrey	Student	2,718	5.66	4th
Surrey Central	Dan Goy		Surrey	Executive assistant	3,211	5.56	4th
Surrey North	Art Hildebrant		Surrey		2,619	7.36	3rd
Vancouver Centre	Scott Robertson		Vancouver	Social worker	6,993	12.05	3rd
Vancouver East	Libby Davies	Member of Parliament for Vancouver East (1997–2015); Member of Vancouver City Council (1982–1993)	Vancouver	Human resources professional	16,818	42.28	1st
Vancouver Kingsway	Victor Wong	NDP candidate for Vancouver Kingsway in the 1997 federal election	Burnaby	Project manager	5,921	15.82	3rd
Vancouver Quadra	Loretta Woodcock		Vancouver		2,595	5.23	4th
Vancouver South—Burnaby	Herschel Hardin	NDP candidate for Vancouver South—Burnaby in the 1997 federal election	West Vancouver	Writer	3,848	9.27	3rd
West Vancouver—Sunshine Coast	Telis Savvaidis		Powell River	Small business owner	3,351	6.29	4th

=== Vancouver Island ===
Riding	Candidate's Name	Notes	Residence	Occupation	Votes	%	Rank
Esquimalt—Juan de Fuca	Carol E. Harris		Victoria	Professor	6,468	13.41	3rd
Nanaimo—Alberni	Bill Holdom	Member of Nanaimo City Council (1986–1996 & 1999–2011)	Nanaimo	Professor at Malaspina University-College	7,635	14.53	3rd
Nanaimo—Cowichan	Garth Mirau	NDP candidate for Nanaimo—Cowichan in the 1997 federal election	Nanaimo	Fisherman	8,599	16.96	3rd
Saanich—Gulf Islands	Pat O'Neill		Salt Spring Island		4,721	8.02	4th
Vancouver Island North	Alex Turner		Courtenay	Teacher	5,701	11.71	3rd
Victoria	David Turner	Mayor of Victoria (1991–1993)	Victoria	Professor at the University of Victoria	7,243	13.02	3rd

== Manitoba ==
Riding	Candidate's Name	Notes	Residence	Occupation	Votes	%	Rank
Brandon—Souris	Errol Black		Brandon	Professor	4,518	12.33	4th
Charleswood—St. James—Assiniboia	Dennis Kshyk	MB NDP candidate for Kirkfield Park in the 1999 Manitoba provincial election	Winnipeg	Workers' compensation professional	2,786	7.26	4th
Churchill	Bev Desjarlais	Member of Parliament for Churchill (1997–2006)	Thompson	Clerk	10,477	44.94	1st
Dauphin—Swan River	Wayne Kines		Roblin	Journalist	5,813	17.47	3rd
Portage—Lisgar	Diane Beresford	President of the Manitoba Teachers' Society (1997–1998); Manitoba NDP candidate for Carman in the 1999 Manitoba provincial election	Notre-Dame-de-Lourdes	Teacher	2,073	6.02	5th
Provencher	Peter Hiebert	Manitoba NDP candidate for Steinbach in the 1999 and the 1995 Manitoba provincial elections NDP candidate for Lisgar in the 1984 federal election	Springfield	Welder	1,980	4.89	4th
Selkirk—Interlake	Paul Pododworny	MB NDP candidate for Lakeside in the 1999 Manitoba provincial election	Winnipeg		8,113	19.91	3rd
St. Boniface	John Edmund Parry	Member of Parliament for Kenora—Rainy River (1984–1988); Former Mayor of Sioux Lookout	Winnipeg	Consultant	5,026	13.00	3rd
Winnipeg Centre	Pat Martin	Member of Parliament for Winnipeg Centre (1997–2015)	Winnipeg	Carpenter	11,263	41.26	1st
Winnipeg North Centre	Judy Wasylycia-Leis	Member of Parliament for Winnipeg North Centre (1997–2004); Member of the Legislative Assembly of Manitoba for St. Johns (1986–1993)	Winnipeg		14,356	58.39	1st
Winnipeg North—St. Paul	Roman Yereniuk	Winnipeg School Division trustee (1989–1995 & 1998–2006); NDP candidate for Winnipeg North—St. Paul in the 1997 federal election	Winnipeg	Professor at St. Andrew's College	7,931	21.13	3rd
Winnipeg South	Duane Nicol		Winnipeg	Healthcare director	4,224	10.04	3rd
Winnipeg South Centre	James Allum		Winnipeg	Professor at the University of Winnipeg	7,501	19.93	3rd
Winnipeg—Transcona	Bill Blaikie	Member of Parliament for Winnipeg—Transcona (1988–2004) and for Winnipeg—Birds Hill (1979–1988)	Winnipeg	United Church minister	15,680	47.85	1st

== New Brunswick ==
Riding	Candidate's Name	Notes	Residence	Occupation	Votes	%	Rank
Acadie—Bathurst	Yvon Godin	Member of Parliament for Acadie—Bathurst (1997–2015)	Bathurst	Union leader (United Steelworkers)	23,568	46.61	1st
Beauséjour—Petitcodiac	Inka Milewski		Miramichi	Marine biologist	3,217	7.06	4th
Fredericton	Michael Dunn		Fredericton		2,584	7.04	4th
Fundy—Royal	John Calder		Kingston	Teacher	2,628	6.97	4th
Madawaska—Restigouche	Claude J. Albert		Atholville		1,811	4.75	4th
Miramichi	Allan Goodfellow	NDP candidate for Miramichi in the 1997 federal election	Derby	Mill worker	2,453	7.40	4th
Moncton—Riverview—Dieppe	Hélène Lapointe		Moncton		3,139	6.95	4th
New Brunswick Southwest	Habib Kilisli		Saint Andrews	Chef	1,173	3.83	4th
Saint John	Rod Hill		Saint John	Professor	2,989	9.09	3rd
Tobique—Mactaquac	Carolyn Van Dine		Woodstock	Self-employed	1,216	3.75	4th

== Newfoundland and Labrador ==
Riding	Candidate's Name	Notes	Residence	Occupation	Votes	%	Rank
Bonavista—Trinity—Conception	Fraser March	NDP candidate for Bonavista—Trinity—Conception in the 1997 federal election	Blaketown	Self-employed	6,473	15.93	3rd
Burin—St. George's	David Sullivan	NDP candidate for Burin—St. George's in the 1997 federal election	Torbay	Teacher	924	3.01	5th
Gander—Grand Falls	Bill Broderick		St. Brendan's		2,876	9.97	3rd
Humber—St. Barbe—Baie Verte	Trevor Taylor		St. Anthony	Union official (Fish, Food and Allied Workers Union)	8,297	26.14	2nd
Labrador	Amanda Will	NL NDP candidate for Virginia Waters in the 1999 Newfoundland and Labrador provincial election	Portugal Cove South	Executive assistant	1,284	12.38	2nd
St. John's East	Carol Cantwell		St. John's	Principal	5,395	12.16	3rd
St. John's West	Dave Curtis		St. John's	Self-employedSt. John's	4,744	11.08	3rd

== Nova Scotia ==
Riding	Candidate's Name	Notes	Residence	Occupation	Votes	%	Rank
Bras d'Or—Cape Breton	Michelle Dockrill	Member of Parliament for Bras d'Or (1997–2000)		Receptionist	7,537	19.86	3rd
Cumberland—Colchester	James Arthur Harpell	NS NDP candidate for Colchester-Musquodoboit Valley in the 1999 Nova Scotia provincial election	Brookfield	Restaurant owner	4,629	11.99	4th
Dartmouth	Wendy Lill	Member of Parliament for Dartmouth (1997–2004)	Dartmouth	Writer	13,585	36.28	1st
Halifax	Alexa McDonough	Leader of the New Democratic Party (1995–2003); Member of Parliament for Halifax (1997–2008); Leader of the Nova Scotia New Democratic Party (1980–1994); Member of the Nova Scotia House of Assembly for Halifax Fairview (1993–1995) and Halifax Chebucto (1981–1993)	Halifax	Social worker	16,563	40.36	1st
Halifax West	Gordon Earle	Member of Parliament for Halifax West (1997–2000)	Halifax	Civil servant	14,016	29.99	2nd
Kings—Hants	Kaye Johnson		Kentville		7,244	16.57	3rd
Pictou—Antigonish—Guysborough	Wendy Panagopoulos	NS NDP candidate for Guysborough—Port Hawkesbury in the 1999 Nova Scotia provincial election	Guysborough		4,498	11.28	3rd
Sackville—Musquodoboit Valley—Eastern Shore	Peter Stoffer	Member of Parliament for Sackville—Musquodoboit Valley—Eastern Shore (1997–2004)	Windsor Junction	Airline employee	13,619	34.48	1st
South Shore	Bill Zimmerman		Wolfville	Professor	4,394	12.17	4th
Sydney—Victoria	Peter Mancini	Member of Parliament for Sydney—Victoria (1997–2000)	Margaree Harbour	Lawyer	14,216	36.53	2nd
West Nova	Phil Roberts		Annapolis Royal	Self-employed	3,976	11.23	4th

== Ontario ==
=== Central Ontario ===
Riding	Candidate's Name	Notes	Residence	Occupation	Votes	%	Rank
Barrie—Simcoe—Bradford	Keith Lindsay		Innisfil		2,385	4.38	4th
Dufferin—Peel—Wellington—Grey	Mitchel Healey		Orangeville	Self-employed	1,473	3.10	4th
Durham	Ken Ranney		Bowmanville	Physician	2,545	5.58	4th
Haliburton—Victoria—Brock	Rick Denyer	ONDP candidate for Haliburton—Victoria—Brock in the 1999 Ontario provincial election NDP candidate for Victoria—Haliburton in the 1997 federal election	Lindsay		2,409	4.89	4th
Northumberland	Ben Burd		Cobourg	Writer	2,141	4.89	4th
Peterborough	Herb Wiseman		Peterborough	Social worker	3,967	7.59	4th
Simcoe—Grey	Michael Kennedy		Loretto	Bus driver	1,646	3.32	4th
Simcoe North	Ann Billings	ONDP candidate for Simcoe North in the 1999 Ontario provincial election NDP candidate for Simcoe North in the 1997 federal election	Orillia		2,272	4.71	4th
York North	Ian Scott		Newmarket		1,696	3.48	4th

=== Eastern Ontario/Ottawa ===
Riding	Candidate's Name	Notes	Residence	Occupation	Votes	%	Rank
Glengarry—Prescott—Russell	Guy Belle-Isle		Hawkesbury		1,877	4.07	4th
Hastings—Frontenac—Lennox and Addington	Tom O'Neill		Greater Napanee	Correctional officer	2,200	5.05	4th
Kingston and the Islands	Gary Wilson	Member of the Legislative Assembly of Ontario for Kingston and the Islands (1990–1995)	Kingston	Librarian	4,951	9.67	4th
Lanark—Carleton	Theresa Kiefer		Ottawa	Teacher	1,946	3.07	4th
Leeds—Grenville	Martin Hanratty		Osgoode	Union official	990	2.10	4th
Nepean—Carleton	Craig Parsons	ONDP candidate for Nepean—Carleton in the 1999 Ontario provincial election	Ottawa	Restaurant manager	2,223	3.72	4th
Ottawa Centre	Heather-Jane Robertson		Gloucester	Author	13,516	23.81	2nd
Ottawa–Orléans	Maureen Prebinski		Orleans	Technician	2,169	4.15	4th
Ottawa South	Jeannie Page		Ottawa	Consultant	3,463	6.69	4th
Ottawa—Vanier	Joseph Zebrowski		Ottawa	Civil servant	4,194	8.71	4th
Ottawa West—Nepean	Kevin Kinsella		Ottawa	Paralegal	2,718	5.21	4th
Prince Edward—Hastings	Jason Gannon		Belleville		1,897	4.77	4th
Renfrew—Nipissing—Pembroke	Ole Hendrickson		Ottawa	Manager	1,607	3.44	4th
Stormont—Dundas—Charlottenburgh	Kimberley Fry		Cornwall	Teaching assistant	1,696	4.14	4th

=== Greater Toronto Area ===
Riding	Candidate's Name	Notes	Residence	Occupation	Votes	%	Rank
Beaches—East York	Mel Watkins	NDP candidate for Beaches—East York in the 1997 federal election	Toronto	Political economist / Professor at the University of Toronto	8,936	20.93	2nd
Bramalea—Gore—Malton—Springdale	Vishnu Roche	ONDP candidate for Bramalea—Gore—Malton—Springdale in the 1999 Ontario provincial election NDP candidate for Mississauga Centre in the 1997 federal election	Mississauga	Occupational health and safety professional	1,864	4.85	4th
Brampton Centre	Sue Slean		Brampton		1,795	4.95	4th
Brampton West—Mississauga	Matt Harsant		Mississauga	Fundraiser	1,567	3.35	4th
Burlington	Larry McMahon		Burlington		1,722	3.63	4th
Davenport	Jordan Berger	Husband of Marit Stiles	Toronto	Manager	3,457	13.56	2nd
Don Valley East	Ron Casey-Nestor		Toronto		2,249	5.78	4th
Don Valley West	Ali Naqvi		Toronto	Businessman	2,024	4.42	4th
Eglinton—Lawrence	Simon Rowland		Toronto	Businessman	2,663	6.42	4th
Etobicoke Centre	Karen Dolan	NDP candidate for Whitby—Ajax in the 1997 federal election	Toronto	Union official (Service Employees International Union)	2,124	4.59	4th
Etobicoke—Lakeshore	Richard Joseph Banigan		Toronto	Publisher	2,835	6.53	4th
Etobicoke North	Ana Maria Sapp		Toronto	Secretary	2,210	6.87	3rd
Halton	Brenda Dolling		Burlington	Teacher	2,633	4.42	3rd
Markham	Janice Hagan	ONDP candidate for Markham in the 1999 Ontario provincial elections	Markham	Teacher	1,129	2.34	4th
Mississauga Centre	Gail McCabe	ONDP candidate for Mississauga Centre in the 1999 Ontario provincial election	Mississauga	Sociologist	1,404	3.69	4th
Mississauga East	Henry Beer		Mississauga	Teacher	1,451	4.22	4th
Mississauga South	Ken Cole	ONDP candidate for Mississauga South in the 1999 Ontario provincial election	Mississauga		1,636	4.10	4th
Mississauga West	Cynthia Kazadi		Mississauga	Dental assistant	1,532	3.10	4th
Oak Ridges	Joseph Thevarkunnel		Richmond Hill	Teacher	1,623	2.92	4th
Oakville	Willie Lambert	NDP candidate for Oakville in the 1997 federal election	Toronto	Bus driver	1,335	2.76	4th
Oshawa	Bruce Rogers	NDP candidate for Parkdale in the 1968 federal election	Blackstock	Broadcast journalist	4,203	11.15	4th
Parkdale—High Park	Paul Schmidt	ONDP candidate for Brampton Centre in the 1999 Ontario provincial election NDP candidate for Parkdale—High Park in the 1997 federal election	Toronto	Principal	7,947	18.99	2nd
Pickering—Ajax—Uxbridge	Ralph Chatoor		Toronto		1,523	3.03	4th
Scarborough—Agincourt	Michael Laxer	Son of James Laxer; Grandson of Robert Laxer	Toronto	Small business owner	1,499	3.94	4th
Scarborough Centre	Ali Mallah		Toronto	Social worker	3,171	7.94	3rd
Scarborough East	Denise Lake		Toronto	Administrator	1,884	4.69	4th
Scarborough—Rouge River	Paulette Senior	ONDP candidate for Scarborough—Rouge River in the 1999 Ontario provincial election	Toronto	Manager	1,793	4.94	4th
Scarborough Southwest	Dan Harris		East York	Student	3,638	10.17	4th
St. Paul's	Guy Hunter		Toronto	Lawyer	4,451	9.48	4th
Thornhill	Nathan Rotman		Toronto	Manager	1,653	3.93	4th
Toronto Centre—Rosedale	David Berlin	Editor of the Literary Review of Canada	Toronto	Writer	5,300	11.19	3rd
Toronto—Danforth	Paula Turtle		Toronto	Lawyer	10,830	27.65	2nd
Trinity—Spadina	Michael Valpy		Toronto	Journalist	16,001	37.99	2nd
Vaughan—King—Aurora	Octavia Beckles		Woodbridge	Bank manager	1,938	3.41	4th
Whitby—Ajax	Vic Perroni		Whitby	Credit union manager	1,523	4.84	4th
Willowdale	Yvonne Bobb		Toronto	Civil servant	2,404	5.45	4th
York Centre	Maurice Coulter		Downsview		2,109	6.05	4th
York South—Weston	Tom Parkin		Toronto		1,288	3.71	3rd
York West	Julia McCrea		Toronto	Vice-principal	2,365	9.25	3rd

=== Hamilton/Niagara ===
Riding	Candidate's Name	Notes	Residence	Occupation	Votes	%	Rank
Ancaster—Dundas—Flamborough—Aldershot	Gordon Guyatt		Dundas	Physician / Professor at McMaster University	3,756	7.76	4th
Erie—Lincoln	Jody Di Bartolomeo		Port Colborne	Occupational safety and health professional	2,423	6.00	4th
Hamilton East	Jim Stevenson		Stoney Creek	Steelworker	4,111	13.22	3rd
Hamilton Mountain	James Stephenson		Hamilton	Manager	4,387	9.91	4th
Hamilton West	Catherine Hudson		Hamilton	Teacher	5,300	13.13	3rd
Niagara Centre	Mike Grimaldi		Welland	Advisor	7,029	14.86	3rd
Niagara Falls	Ed Booker		St. Catharines		2,356	6.04	4th
St. Catharines	John Bacher		St. Catharines	Author	2,356	6.16	4th
Stoney Creek	Mark Davies		Hamilton	Social services worker	3,083	6.52	4th

=== Northern Ontario ===
Riding	Candidate's Name	Notes	Residence	Occupation	Votes	%	Rank
Algoma—Manitoulin	Grant Buck		Elliot Lake	Teacher	4,326	13.95	3rd
Kenora—Rainy River	Susan Barclay		Sioux Lookout	Anglican priest	6,868	21.54	3rd
Nickel Belt	Sandy Bass		Lively	Teacher	7,304	21.16	2nd
Nipissing	Wendy Young	ONDP candidate for Nipissing in the 1999 Ontario provincial election	North Bay	Professor	2,572	7.77	4th
Parry Sound—Muskoka	Joanne Bury		Gravenhurst		1,665	4.42	4th
Sault Ste. Marie	Bud Wildman	Member of the Legislative Assembly of Ontario for Algoma (1975–1999)	Echo Bay	Teacher	9,202	24.77	2nd
Sudbury	Paul Chislett	President of Communications, Energy and Paperworkers Union of Canada Local 37; ONDP candidate for Sudbury in the 1999 Ontario provincial election National Party candidate for Sudbury in the 1993 federal election	Sudbury	Telecommunications worker	4,368	12.60	3rd
Thunder Bay—Atikokan	Rick Baker		Thunder Bay	Papermill worker	6,023	19.45	3rd
Thunder Bay—Superior North	John Rafferty		Thunder Bay	Teacher	6,169	19.48	3rd
Timiskaming—Cochrane	Ambrose Raftis		Charlton	Consultant	2,461	7.91	4th
Timmins—James Bay	Len Wood	Member of the Legislative Assembly of Ontario for Cochrane North (1990–1999)	Kapuskasing	Mechanic	9,385	31.15	2nd

=== Southwestern Ontario ===
Riding	Candidate's Name	Notes	Residence	Occupation	Votes	%	Rank
Brant	Dee Chisholm		Brantford		3,126	7.33	4th
Bruce—Grey—Owen Sound	Karen Gventer		Owen Sound	Consultant	2,166	4.83	4th
Cambridge	Pam Wolf		Cambridge	Teacher	4,111	8.65	4th
Chatham-Kent—Essex	Susan MacKay		LaSalle	Nurse	2,209	5.47	4th
Elgin—Middlesex—London	Tim McCallum		Dutton/Dunwich	Factory worker	2,319	5.53	4th
Essex	Marion Overholt		Windsor	Lawyer	6,431	13.89	3rd
Guelph—Wellington	Edward Pickersgill		Guelph		5,685	10.36	4th
Haldimand—Norfolk—Brant	Norm Walpole		Waterford	Principal	2,124	4.77	4th
Huron—Bruce	Christine Kemp		Clinton	Communications professional	2,669	6.18	4th
Kitchener Centre	Paul Royston		Kitchener	Student	3,058	6.87	4th
Kitchener–Waterloo	Richard Walsh-Bowers	ONDP candidate for Waterloo—Wellington in the 1999 Ontario provincial election	Wallenstein	Professor at Wilfrid Laurier University	4,394	8.15	4th
Lambton—Kent—Middlesex	Joyce Jolliffe		Strathroy	Labourer	1,871	4.34	4th
London—Fanshawe	Andrew Sadler		London	Teaching assistant	4,107	11.44	4th
London North Centre	Colleen Redmond	NDP candidate for London North Centre in the 1997 federal election	London		3,936	8.89	4th
London West	George Goodlet		London		3,596	7.46	4th
Oxford	Shawn Rouse		Woodstock		2,254	5.28	4th
Perth—Middlesex	Sam Dinicol		Stratford	Student	2,800	6.65	4th
Sarnia—Lambton	Glenn Sonier		Corunna	Union official (Communications, Energy and Paperworkers Union of Canada)	2,735	7.21	4th
Waterloo—Wellington	Allan Douglas Strong		New Hamburg	Social worker	1,845	4.11	4th
Windsor—St. Clair	Joe Comartin		Windsor	Lawyer	17,001	40.84	1st
Windsor West	John McGinlay		Windsor		6,080	15.90	3rd

== Prince Edward Island ==
Riding	Candidate's Name	Notes	Residence	Occupation	Votes	%	Rank
Cardigan	Deborah Kelly Hawkes		Montague		465	2.62	4th
Egmont	Nancy Wallace		O'Leary	Administrator	1,139	6.18	3rd
Hillsborough	Dody Crane	Leader of the New Democratic Party of Prince Edward Island (1989–1991)	Charlottetown	Lawyer	4,328	21.86	3rd
Malpeque	Ken Bingham		New Glasgow		782	4.24	4th

== Quebec ==
=== Central Quebec ===
Riding	Candidate's Name	Notes	Residence	Occupation	Votes	%	Rank
Bas-Richelieu—Nicolet—Bécancour	Raymond Dorion		Bécancour	Self-employed	421	0.95	6th
Berthier—Montcalm	Jean-Pierre De Billy	NDP candidate for Berthier—Montcalm in the 1997 federal election	Saint-Calixte		823	1.48	6th
Champlain	Philip Toone		Montreal		672	1.49	5th
Joliette	François Rivest		Saint-Charles-Borromée	Student	1,085	2.40	5th
Lotbinière—L'Érable	Dominique Vaillancourt	NDP candidate for Lotbinière in the 1997 federal election	Montreal	Translator	538	1.60	5th
Portneuf	None				–	–	–
Repentigny	Pierre Péclet		Lachenaie		831	1.43	6th
Saint-Maurice	Raymond Chase		Montreal	Photographer	359	0.83	5th
Trois-Rivières	David Horlock		Montreal	Student	512	1.07	6th

=== Eastern Townships/Southern Quebec ===
Riding	Candidate's Name	Notes	Residence	Occupation	Votes	%	Rank
Beauce	Pierre Malano		Montreal	Antique dealer	436	0.94	6th
Beauharnois—Salaberry	Elizabeth Clark	NDP candidate for Rimouski—Mitis in the 1997 federal election	Montreal	Administrator	703	1.42	5th
Brome—Missisquoi	Jeff Itcush	NDP candidate for Saint-Laurent—Cartierville in the 1997 federal election	Montreal	Teacher	480	1.12	5th
Châteauguay	Robert Lindblad		Ville-Émard	Investigator	622	1.12	6th
Compton—Stanstead	Christine Moore	NDP candidate for Compton—Stanstead in the 1997 federal election			580	1.52	5th
Drummond	Julie Philion		Montreal	Administrator	423	1.01	5th
Frontenac—Mégantic	Olivier Chalifoux		Lac-Mégantic		427	1.15	6th
Richmond—Arthabaska	Vincent Bernier		Montreal	Graphic designer	319	0.64	6th
Saint-Hyacinthe—Bagot	Rachel Dicaire		Montreal	Administrator	499	1.07	5th
Saint-Jean	Julien Patenaude	NDP candidate for Saint-Jean in the 1997 federal election	Saint-Jean-sur-Richelieu		698	1.46	6th
Shefford	Elizabeth Morey		Montreal		380	0.84	6th
Sherbrooke	Craig Wright		Montreal		677	1.34	5th

=== Greater Montreal ===
Riding	Candidate's Name	Notes	Residence	Occupation	Votes	%	Rank
Ahuntsic	Steve Moran	NDP candidate for Ahuntsic in the 1997 federal election	Montreal	Executive assistant	997	1.88	6th
Anjou—Rivière-des-Prairies	Bruce Whelan		Montreal	Student	624	1.28	6th
Bourassa	Richard Gendron		Montreal	Anthropologist	736	1.80	5th
Brossard—La Prairie	Clémence Provencher		Montreal		852	1.67	5th
Chambly	Darren O'Toole	NDP candidate for Chambly in the 1997 federal election	Montreal	Student	769	1.47	6th
Hochelaga—Maisonneuve	Milan Mirich	Party of Democratic Socialism candidate for Laurier-Dorion in the 1998 Quebec provincial election NDP candidate for Hochelaga—Maisonneuve in the 1997 federal election NDPQ candidate for Laurier-Dorion in the 1994 Quebec provincial election and for Maisonneuve in the 1985 provincial election	Montreal	Restaurant owner	767	1.78	6th
Lac-Saint-Louis	Erin Sikora		Montreal	Sales professional	1,464	2.50	5th
LaSalle—Émard	David Bernans		Montreal	Researcher	837	1.72	5th
Laurier—Sainte-Marie	Richard Chartier		Laval	Executive assistant	2,111	4.75	5th
Laval Centre	Jean-Yves Dion	NDP candidate for Laval Centre in the 1997 federal election	Laval	Clerk	832	1.52	6th
Laval East	Sujata Dey		Montreal	Communications professional	573	0.99	7th
Laval West	Christian Patenaude		Montreal	Student	764	1.23	6th
Longueuil	Timothy Spurr		Montreal	Student	655	1.64	6th
Mercier	Nicholas Vikander		Montreal	Student	480	1.03	7th
Mount Royal	Maria Pia Chávez		Montreal	Social worker	1,034	2.54	5th
Notre-Dame-de-Grâce—Lachine	Bruce Toombs		Montreal	Professor	2,208	4.73	4th
Outremont	Peter Graefe	NDP candidate for Laval East in the 1997 federal election	Montreal	Student	2,199	5.58	4th
Papineau—Saint-Denis	Hans Marotte		Montreal	Lawyer	1,983	4.48	4th
Pierrefonds—Dollard	Adam Hodgins		Montreal	Administrator	1,109	2.05	6th
Rivière-des-Mille-Îles	Stephane Thinel		Sainte-Thérèse	Machinist	739	1.38	6th
Rosemont—La Petite-Patrie	Noémi Lo Pinto		Montreal	Journalist	1,417	2.99	6th
Saint-Bruno—Saint-Hubert	Marie Henretta	NDP candidate for Saint-Bruno—Saint-Hubert in the 1997 federal election	Mont-Saint-Hilaire	Teacher	1,029	2.04	6th
Saint-Lambert	None				–	–	–
Saint-Laurent—Cartierville	Piper Elizabeth Huggins		Montreal		1,070	2.40	5th
Saint-Léonard—Saint-Michel	Sara Mayo	NDP candidate for Frontenac—Mégantic in the 1997 federal election	Montreal	Geographer	528	1.14	6th
Terrebonne—Blainville	Normand Beaudet		Blainville		1,111	1.99	6th
Vaudreuil—Soulanges	Shaun G. Lynch		Saint-Lazare	Consultant	904	1.77	5th
Verchères—Les Patriotes	Charles Bussières		Montreal	Musician	1,074	1.96	6th
Verdun—Saint-Henri—Saint-Paul—Pointe Saint-Charles	Matthew McLauchlin		Montreal	Translator	1,003	2.46	5th
Westmount—Ville-Marie	Willy Blomme		Montreal	Student	1,990	5.19	4th

=== Northern Quebec ===
Riding	Candidate's Name	Notes	Residence	Occupation	Votes	%	Rank
Abitibi—Baie-James—Nunavik	Daniel Fredrick		Montreal	Administrator	534	1.47	5th
Chicoutimi—Le Fjord	Alain Ranger		Montreal	Waiter	698	1.67	5th
Jonquière	Michel Deraiche		Montreal	Executive assistant	1,139	3.52	4th
Lac-Saint-Jean—Saguenay	Linda Proulx		Montreal	Receptionist	417	1.29	6th
Manicouagan	Normand Caplette	NDP candidate for Repentigny in the 1997 federal election	Montreal	Student	386	1.77	5th
Roberval	Alain Giguère	NDP candidate for Roberval in the 1997 and 1993 federal elections and for Verdun—Saint-Paul in the 1984 federal election NDPQ candidate for Saint-Henri in the 1985 Quebec provincial election	Montreal	Lawyer	437	1.42	5th
Témiscamingue	Anik-Maude Morin	NDP candidate for Témiscamingue in the 1997 federal election	Montreal	Massage therapist	493	1.31	5th

=== Quebec City/Gaspe/Eastern Quebec ===
Riding	Candidate's Name	Notes	Residence	Occupation	Votes	%	Rank
Beauport—Montmorency—Côte-de-Beaupré—Île-d'Orléans	Eric Hébert	NDP candidate for Saint-Maurice in the 1997 federal election	Montreal	Administrator	869	1.69	6th
Bellechasse—Etchemins—Montmagny—L'Islet	None				–	–	–
Bonaventure—Gaspé—Îles-de-la-Madeleine—Pabok	Fred Kraenzel		Gaspé		613	1.70	4th
Charlesbourg—Jacques-Cartier	Françoise Dicaire		Montreal	Administrator	1,000	1.75	6th
Charlevoix	Joss Duhaime		Montreal	Student	484	1.45	5th
Kamouraska—Rivière-du-Loup—Témiscouata—Les Basques	Elaine Côté	NDP candidate for Kamouraska—Rivière-du-Loup—Témiscouata—Les Basques in the 1997 federal election	Montreal	Administrator	836	2.15	5th
Lévis-et-Chutes-de-la-Chaudière	France Michaud	NDP candidate for Lévis in the 1997 federal election	Montreal	Real estate agent	1,411	2.24	5th
Louis-Hébert	Karl Adomeit	NDP candidate for Louis-Hébert in the 1997 federal election	Quebec City	Researcher	1,200	2.08	5th
Matapédia—Matane	Karine Paquet-Gauthier		Rimouski	Student	935	2.97	4th
Quebec	Jean-Marie Fiset	NDP candidate for Québec in the 1997 federal election and for Portneuf in the 1988 federal election NDPQ candidate for Montmorency in the 1994 Quebec provincial election and for Portneuf in the 1993 Portneuf provincial by-election	Quebec City	Hospital employee	1,714	3.25	5th
Quebec East	Majella Desmeules	NDP candidate for Portneuf in the 1997 federal election	Quebec City	Political scientist	1,192	2.11	5th
Rimouski—Neigette-et-La-Mitis	René Lemieux		Pointe-au-Père	Student	525	1.58	6th

=== Western Quebec/Laurentides/Outaouais ===
Riding	Candidate's Name	Notes	Residence	Occupation	Votes	%	Rank
Argenteuil—Papineau—Mirabel	Didier Charles	NDP candidate for Argenteuil—Papineau in the 1997 federal election	Ripon	Student	550	1.09	7th
Gatineau	Carl Hétu		Gatineau	Instructor	1,763	3.49	5th
Hull—Aylmer	Peter Piening	NDP candidate for Hull—Aylmer in the 1997 federal election	Hull	Translator	1,521	3.49	5th
Laurentides	Brendan Naef		Mont-Tremblant	Researcher	720	1.18	6th
Pontiac—Gatineau—Labelle	Melissa Hunter		Ottawa		840	1.85	5th

== Saskatchewan ==
Riding	Candidate's Name	Notes	Residence	Occupation	Votes	%	Rank
Battlefords—Lloydminster	Elgin Wayne Wyatt		North Battleford	Teacher	5,107	17.39	2nd
Blackstrap	Noreen Johns		Allan	Farmer	9,551	26.36	2nd
Churchill River	Ray Funk	Member of Parliament for Prince Albert—Churchill River (1988–1993)	Spruce Home	Researcher	5,141	21.81	3rd
Cypress Hills—Grasslands	Keith Murch		Lancer	Farmer	5,101	16.91	2nd
Palliser	Dick Proctor	Member of Parliament for Palliser (1997–2004)	Regina	Consultant	12,136	38.16	1st
Prince Albert	Dennis J. Nowoselsky		Prince Albert		6,676	20.53	3rd
Regina—Lumsden—Lake Centre	John Solomon	Member of Parliament for Regina—Lumsden—Lake Centre (1997–2000) and Regina—Lumsden (1993–1997); Member of the Legislative Assembly of Saskatchewan for Regina North West (1986–1993 & 1979–1982)	Regina	Small business owner	12,424	42.40	2nd
Regina—Qu'Appelle	Lorne Nystrom	Member of Parliament for Regina—Qu'Appelle (1997–2004); Member of Parliament for Yorkton—Melville (1968–1993)	Regina	Consultant	11,731	41.30	1st
Saskatoon—Humboldt	Armand Roy		St. Louis	Farmer	9,420	26.43	2nd
Saskatoon—Rosetown—Biggar	Dennis Gruending	Member of Parliament for Saskatoon—Rosetown—Biggar (1999–2000)	Saskatoon	Journalist	11,109	41.41	2nd
Saskatoon—Wanuskewin	Hugh Walker		Saskatoon	Agricultural economist	8,022	24.23	2nd
Souris—Moose Mountain	Tom Cameron		Carievale	Farmer	4,755	15.61	2nd
Wascana	Garth Ormiston		Regina	Electrician	7,446	21.53	3rd
Yorkton—Melville	Peter Champagne		Melville	Train conductor	5,007	15.78	3rd

== The Territories ==
Riding	Candidate's Name	Notes	Residence	Occupation	Votes	%	Rank
Nunavut	Palluq Susan Enuaraq		Iqaluit		1,410	18.27	2nd
Western Arctic	Dennis Bevington	Mayor of Fort Smith (1988–1997)	Fort Smith	Small business owner	3,430	26.71	2nd
Yukon	Louise Hardy	Member of Parliament for Yukon (1997–2000)	Whitehorse	Social worker	4,223	31.95	2nd
