= Laxer =

Laxer is a surname. Notable people with the surname include:

- James Laxer, Canadian political economist, professor and author
- Michael Laxer, Canadian shopkeeper and political activist
- Robert Laxer, Canadian psychologist, professor, author, and political activist

== See also ==
- Lacrosse player
