= 1971 New Democratic Party leadership election =

Party election in Canada

- April 21–24, 1971
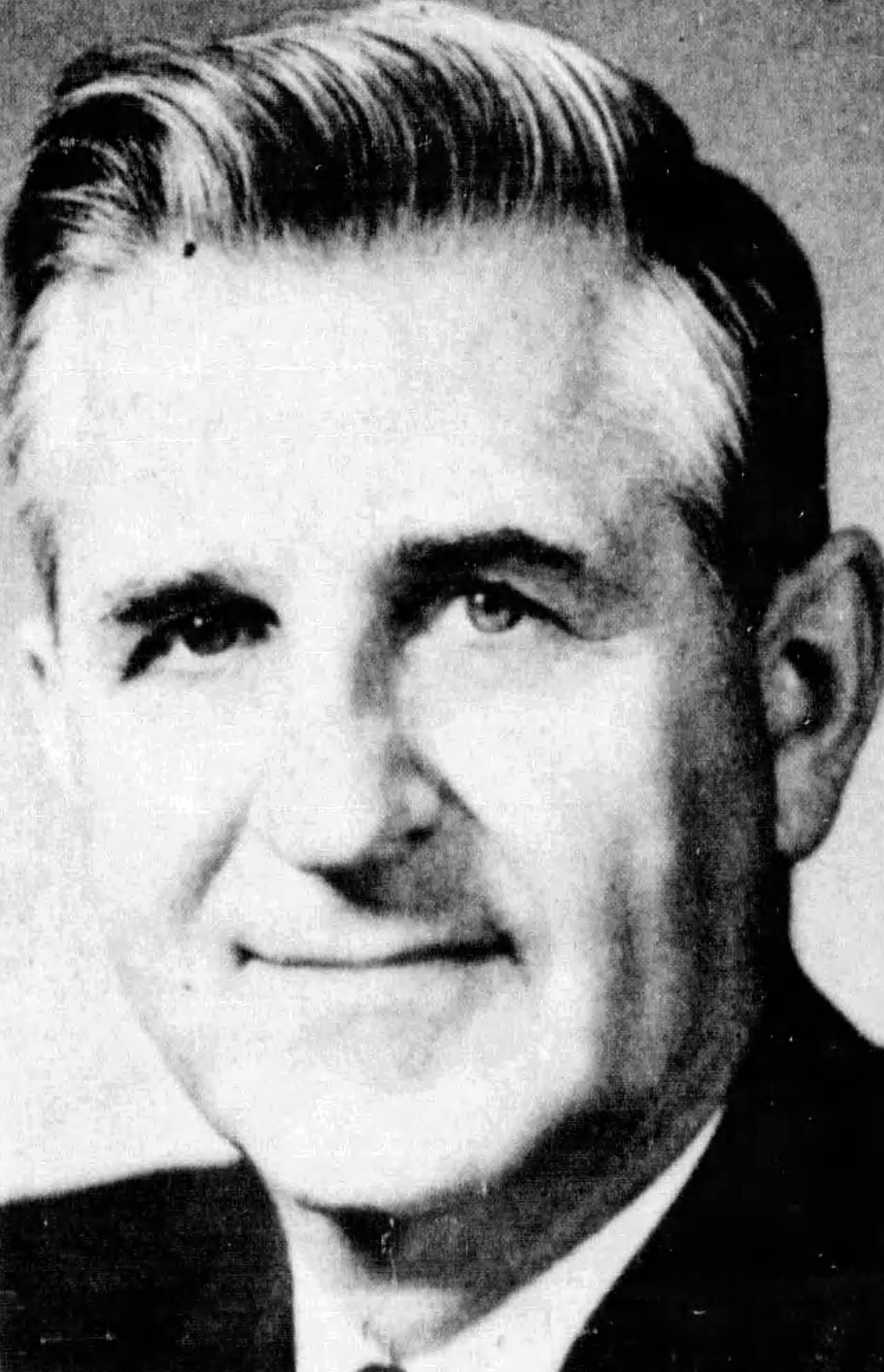

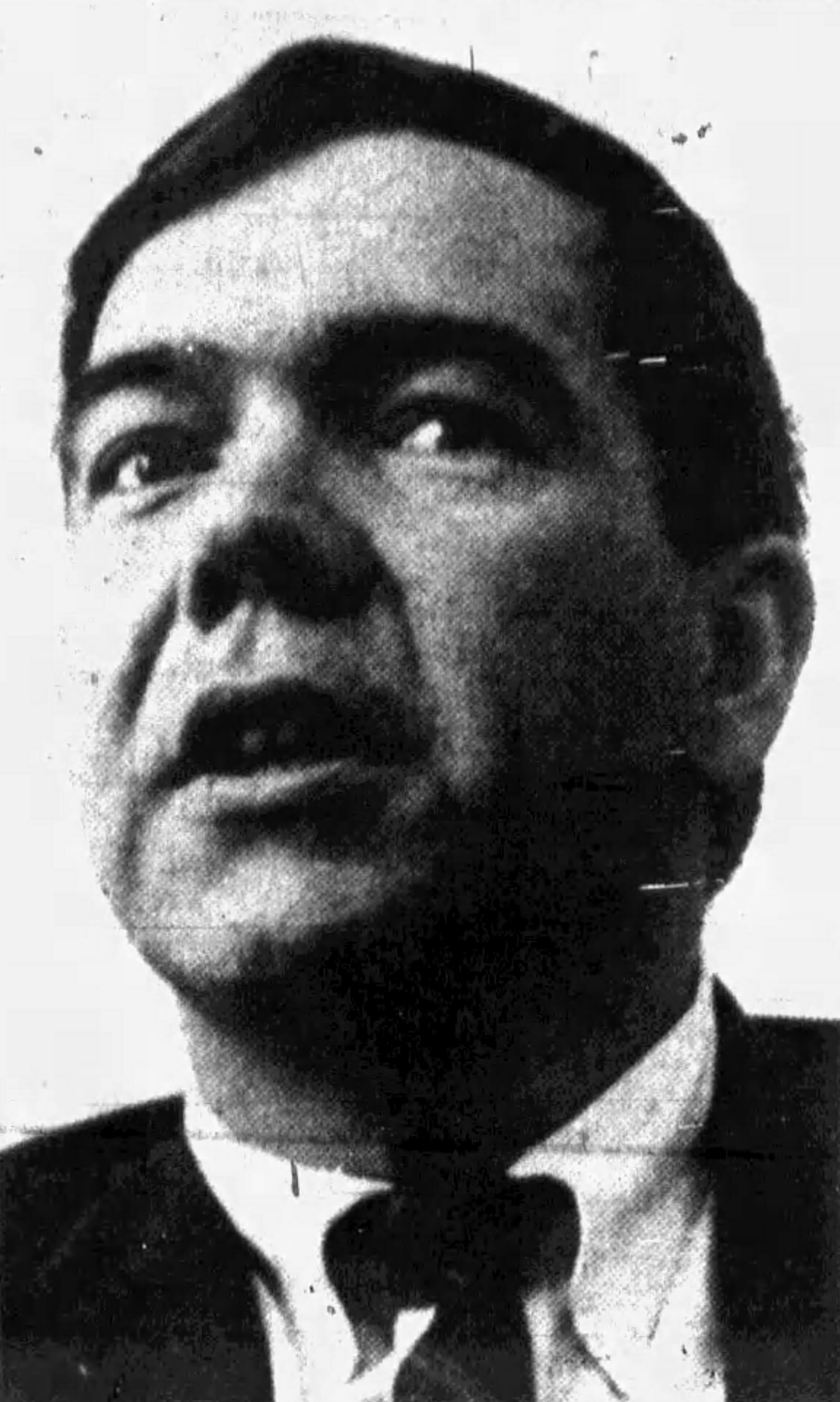

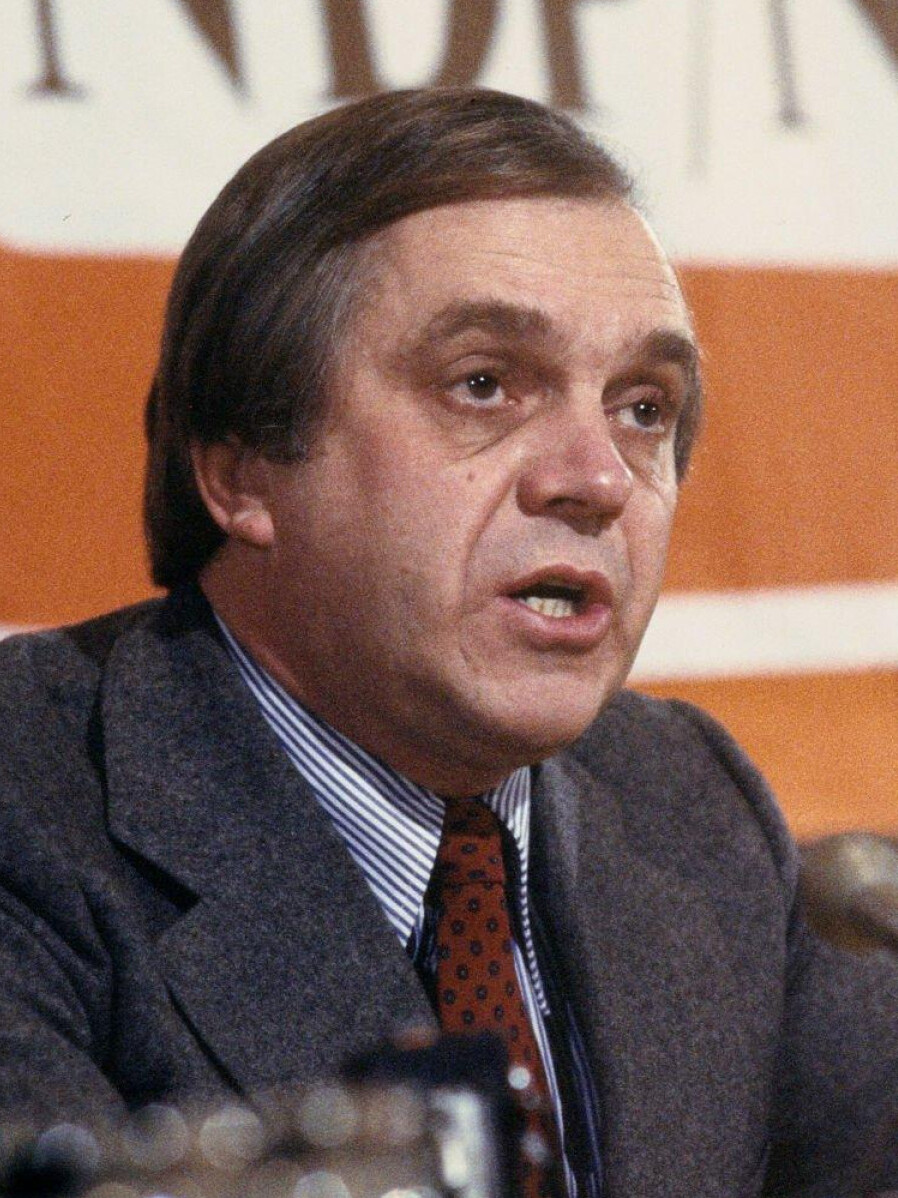
		JL
Candidate	David Lewis	James Laxer
Fourth ballot delegate count	1,046 (63.1%)	612 (36.9%)
First ballot delegate count	661 (38.9%)	378 (22.3%)
Candidate	John Paul Harney	Ed Broadbent
Fourth ballot delegate count	Eliminated	Eliminated
First ballot delegate count	299 (17.6%)	236 (13.9%)
Leader before election
Tommy Douglas
Elected leader
David Lewis

1971 New Democratic Party leadership election
- Date: April 21–24, 1971
- Convention: Ottawa, Ontario
- Resigning leader: Tommy Douglas
- Won by: David Lewis
- Ballots: 4
- Candidates: 5
- Spending limit: $10,500

From April 21 to April 24, 1971, the New Democratic Party held a leadership convention to choose a new federal leader. The convention was held while the Waffle faction was at the zenith of its popularity and power. David Lewis was elected as the party leader, and Donald C. MacDonald, the former Ontario NDP leader, was elected as the party's president. The major non-leadership issues were what stance would the party take in terms of Quebec sovereignty and whether policy initiatives calling for the nationalization of the oil, gas, and mining industries would pass.

== The Waffle–Unity Group floor battle ==
The Waffle was a group of mostly young, university students and intellectuals. It was formed in 1969 and was led at the convention by University of Toronto economist Mel Watkins, an NDP vice-president, and James Laxer, a candidate to replace Tommy Douglas as federal leader. The Unity Group – also known as "NDP NOW", from the title of a pamphlet released earlier in the year that espoused its philosophy – was a committee of party establishment officials and organizers set up to oppose the Waffle at the convention by presenting more moderate views at the convention floor microphones. It was formed in 1970, after the well-organized Waffle had effectively taken over much of the floor debate at the Winnipeg Convention in October 1969. The group was headed by Desmond Morton, a University of Toronto professor who was involved with organizing the party in Ontario, and Marion Bryden, the director of research for the Ontario NDP. Lynn Williams, of the United Steelworkers, was the main link between the Unity Group and organized labour. He helped co-ordinate the Canadian Labour Congress' (CLC) actions during the convention. The big issues over which the groups fought were those of Quebec's right to self-determination, and large scale nationalization of the natural resources/energy sector. The Waffle was at the forefront for advocating these ideas, while the Unity Group put up the defence against these proposals The Unity Group won these debates, and the Waffle's motions on these issues were defeated or heavily modified.

== Gender equity motion ==
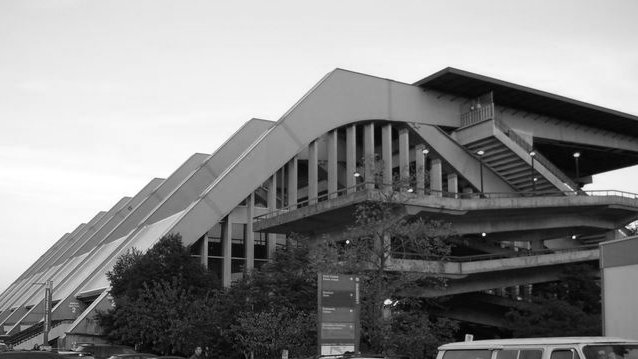
The Ottawa Civic Centre where the convention was held

The first test for the Waffle, on the convention floor, occurred on opening day, Wednesday, April 21. That afternoon, the constitution committee tabled a motion to ensure at least 12 of the approximately 100 members of the ruling Federal Council were women. The Waffle put their full support behind it, when Krista Maeots, leadership candidate James Laxer's wife, put forward the resolution that 12 of the 24 council members elected at the convention be women. She was met by surprising resistance from fellow women, but had the support of leadership candidate John Harney. It needed a two-thirds majority to pass, according to the party's constitution, but many delegates thought it was tokenism, and voted down the resolution two to one.

== Natural resources nationalization debate ==
On Friday, April 23, the most complex and thorny issues were debated. The first contentious issue on the agenda dealt with natural resources industries, such as the oil, gas, and mines, as it became the centre of a major showdown between the Waffle and the labour movement forces. The Waffle faction wanted total nationalization and public ownership of resource industries. The party establishment, and Labour, being more moderate, wanted only to expand public and co-operative ownership. The hour-long debate, quickly transcended into raucous name-calling and physical pushing and shoving at the microphone stands. Sidney Green, Manitoba’s Minister of Mines and Resources in the NDP provincial government, spoke in favour of the moderate resolutions committee motion. He was countered on the convention floor by university professor Peter Usher, a Waffle member from Ottawa, who moved to refer the committee’s motion back for redrafting to push for nationalization of all resource industries. After much heated debate, his motion was defeated in a standing-count vote by a three to one margin. The standing vote was needed because Waffle members challenged two previous voting attempts. Once defeated, the Unity Group, and its labour supporters, pressed for the adoption of the original eight-point resolution, which then passed easily with a five to one plurality. With the Waffle’s amendment defeated, it seemed unlikely that they could pass other motions that called for the nationalization of other economic sectors like manufacturing, financial, and transportation.

== The Quebec issue ==
No other issue at the convention caused more worry for the NDP than what its policy should be with regards to Quebec self-determination. The Waffle's position called for the recognition of Quebecers' right to secede from the rest of Canada, without intervention from the other provinces and the federal government. The Unity Group, and its allies, urged the convention not to take a stance which could be construed by Canadian voters as assisting Quebec separation. In an effort to prevent the whole Quebec issue even reaching the floor, the Unity Group tried to reach a compromise with the Waffle and the NDP's Quebec wing the day before the convention started. In essence, compromise would have been a "commitment to Canadian union while saying that the constitutional arrangements between Ottawa and the provinces must be completely renegotiated." It went on to further state that "The unity of this country cannot be based on force. ... If one of our provinces were to choose to separate, freely and democratically, it would be madness to attempt to restrain it by force." A compromise could not be reached as the small Quebec contingent – and the Waffle members in attendance at the resolutions committee – refused to vote to accept the new resolution, forcing the Quebec issue on to the convention floor on Friday, April 23.

The next day, while giving his final leader's report, T. C. "Tommy" Douglas launched the party establishment's opening salvo against the Waffle and their Quebec resolution. He told the almost 2000 convention attendees that he rejected the principle that Quebec has the right to self-determination through unilateral separation from Canada. He further rejected the notion that non-Quebecers could not partake in that province's internal debates and stated that he would "do everything I can to better the conditions of those people in Quebec who have been betrayed by successive governments." He reiterated the intent of the compromise motion by stating that if "the overwhelming majority of the people of Quebec want out of Confederation, it will be time enough to call in the lawyers." To further support Douglas' call for dialogue between English and French-speaking Canadians, towards an equal partnership based on common goals, Ontario NDP leader Stephen Lewis (David Lewis's son) announced his section's support for national unity.

The Quebec wing, led by Raymond Laliberté, a former head of Quebec's activist teachers' union, Centrale des syndicats du Québec (CEQ), was making noises that they might secede from the party if it adopted the federalist resolution. The official resolution that the Waffle and the Quebec wing refused to vote on the previous day was: "The unity of our country cannot be based on force. However, the business of the NDP is to work for a united Canada, on a basis that will do full justice to our people." To counter this, Richard Comber, the Waffle's Quebec leader, and Laliberté proposed a resolution from the floor to form a new alliance between the two Canadian founding nations. Their resolution demanded: "A recognition to Quebeckers of their absolute right to self-determination, meaning their right to collectively determine the degree of political sovereignty which they desire."

On Friday, the debate and vote on the Quebec issue lasted about an hour and a half. The Resolutions Committee's motion was tabled by leadership contender, David Lewis. He led the charge against the Waffle, speaking from the floor, and surrounded by approximately 600 supporters, stated: "You would be doing an immense disservice to the party and this great country if this convention binds itself to any resolution that questions the desire of the people to live in one united Canada." Another leadership hopeful, Ed Broadbent, tried to bridge the two polarized factions, by attempting to introduce a compromise amendment to Lewis' motion that said: "There should be no questioning of the fundamental right of Quebeckers to leave Confederation if the decision is democratically arrived by the people of Quebec." His amendment garnered little support, and was rejected outright by a wide majority. In the end, the vast majority of the 1,700 convention delegates supported the Lewis motion, with a show of hands. The motion backed a one-Canada stand, and really gave the party's establishment a free-hand on how to prepare a more detailed position for the up-coming federal election, since the motion also made the party's establishment-controlled Federal Council responsible for producing that policy. After the Quebec wing's defeat on the Quebec motion, Laliberté refused to state whether they would leave the party, only suggesting that it would be dealt with at their June provincial convention.

== Party officer elections ==
NDP Now and the Waffle fought for control of the party's bureaucracy, by trying to get as many people elected as party officers of the Federal Executive and Council. The major battles were for the party's executive positions, especially the President and Vice-President positions. NDP Now, and its trade union backers, nominated the Ontario NDP's former leader, Donald C. MacDonald as its candidate for party President. The Waffle candidate was Susan Gudmundson, from Saskatoon, Saskatchewan. Both MacDonald and Gudmundson were vying to succeed Allan Blakeney, who was stepping down as president because he recently was elected as the leader of the Saskatchewan NDP. MacDonald won 885 to 565, as expected, but Gudmundson received a surprisingly high level of support, due in part, to leadership candidate Ed Broadbent's supporters and the relative strength of the Waffle's supporters.

Gudmundson then ran for one of the seven Vice-President positions, as did fellow Waffler Mel Watkins. She managed to get elected, but Watkins failed to keep his seat on the executive, and had to run for a general council seat instead. David Lewis' campaign manager, McGill University professor Charles Taylor easily won re-election as a Vice-President.

The whole Federal Council, including the executive, had 124 members, on which the Waffle held 20 positions going into the elections. After April 23, they held only Gudmundson and Watkins' seats. On April 25, Laxer and Watkins tried to get on the executive, as there were still two vacant seats. They were overwhelmingly rebuffed in their attempts by the pro-establishment council.

== Leadership contenders ==
=== David Lewis ===
David Lewis was seen as the front runner by the media. He had worked for either the NDP and its forerunner, the Co-operative Commonwealth Federation, for almost 36 years. He was the National Secretary from 1936 until 1950, when he moved from Ottawa to Toronto to set up a labour law practice. He served as the National President of the CCF during its final years, and was one of the main organizers behind bringing labour and democratic socialists together to form the NDP in 1961. He had been the Member of Parliament for the federal electoral district of York South, since 1962 (with the exception of a two-year period between 1963 and 1965). The two times that T. C. Douglas did not win a seat to parliament, Lewis took over as house leader. The second time, in 1968, essentially left Lewis as the de facto leader. His years of service and control of most of the federal party's apparatus made him the "establishment" candidate, and the one to beat at the convention. During the leadership campaign, he did not travel around the country, as the other candidates had to, since he did most of his electioneering in the fall of 1970, and declared his intentions formally in December 1970, as a direct result of this work.

=== Ed Broadbent ===
Ed Broadbent was a newly elected Member of Parliament, for the Oshawa–Whitby electoral district, and was the first candidate to declare candidacy for the leadership when he did so in June 1970. He had been one of the founders of the Waffle, but backed away from them before the 1969 convention. He ran partially to bridge the gulf between the Waffle and the Establishment in the party. When Lewis and Frank Howard attacked the Waffle, Broadbent warned that they were setting up the convention to be divided along Waffle/Establishment lines, which is what happened. Before getting into politics, Broadbent was a professor at York University, teaching political theory. He was educated at the University of Toronto and the London School of Economics. His performance on the Quebec issue the day before the leadership vote cost him much of his support as his amendments were rejected outright on the convention floor.

=== John Harney ===
John Harney was born in Quebec and was fluently bilingual. Entering the race in November 1970, he turned forty years old during the campaign, and like the other candidates, was essentially a generation younger than David Lewis. Like Broadbent, he was a university professor, first at the University of Guelph, and later at York University, teaching English literature. He was the Provincial Secretary for the Ontario New Democratic Party from 1966 to 1970. In that time, he was also the campaign manager for that party's breakthrough campaign in the 1967 general election. However, he had a major disadvantage compared to some of the other candidates: at the time of the leadership campaign, he did not hold elected office, and had been defeated in four previous attempts to get elected to the House of Commons. The Quebec issue, and much of the fall-out from weeks of debating it before the convention, pulled Harney away from the issues that he was trying to get debated, notably regulating financial institutions to use their wealth to promote programs that had social benefits for all, and following the Ontario NDP's plan for nationalizing resource industries.

=== Frank Howard ===
Of all of Lewis' challengers, Frank Howard was the oldest at 45, still considerably younger than Lewis' 61 years, and the only one not from Ontario. He entered the leadership campaign in January 1971, attacking the Waffle for what he perceived to be their political naiveté. At the time, he had served in the Commons for 14 years, one of the last CCF MPs left from the 1957 federal election, representing the Skeena electoral district. He was known for his caustic, no-nonsense approach to politics, and was frequently in trouble with the Speaker of the House of Commons. He also had a criminal record for armed robbery, committed when he was 18. This naturally led him to espousing penal reform as one of his main platform items. His other platform plank included support for native-Canadian issues, or in the parlance of the time, Indian Affairs. He did not spend much time campaigning before the convention, and even went on a two-week parliamentary trip to Australia and New Zealand in March. His strategy was to win delegate support at the convention in the days leading up to the Saturday vote.

=== James (Jim) Laxer ===
James Laxer was the youngest candidate, at 29 years old. He was the Waffle's candidate for leader, and he espoused their ultra-nationalistic left-wing views. He came from a family that had been keen supporters of the Communist Party of Canada, until 1956, when Soviet Premier Nikita Khrushchev made public Josef Stalin's reign of terror. In the mid-1960s, he was the president of Canadian University Press, and was a lecturer at Queen's University during the campaign. He was married to Krista Maeots, who ran unsuccessfully for the NDP's presidency at the 1969 policy convention. She was also a leading figure in the Waffle movement. He did not hold elected office, but because all the candidates were debating the Waffle's issues he was effectively Lewis' main challenger.

== Declined ==
- Doug Fisher, former MP for Port Arthur
- Allan O'Brien, mayor of Halifax, Nova Scotia
- Charles Taylor, philosopher at McGill University

== Leadership vote ==
On Saturday, April 24, at the Ottawa Civic Centre, David Lewis was elected the party's new leader after four ballots. This was the first time in CCF/NDP history that the leadership wasn't won on the first ballot. Unlike the recent Progressive Conservatives and Liberal conventions, where there were problems with computerized voting machines, the NDP decided to stay with the more traditional paper ballot book and manual vote tabulation system. The party organizers divided the approximately 1,700 delegates into 20 polls, similar to a federal electoral district vote, with returning officers that carried the ballot boxes to the voters. The balloting took less than an hour for each round. The first ballots results were announced within an hour of the 2:00 p.m. starting time. The second round vote results were released by 3:30 p.m., the third round by 4:15 p.m., and the final fourth ballot by 4:40 p.m. The recent Ontario Progressive Conservative party leadership election took about ten hours, due to its use of an embryonic electronic balloting system that did not work as advertised.

Delegate support by ballot
Candidate	1st ballot		2nd ballot		3rd ballot		4th ballot	
Name	Votes cast	%	Votes cast	%	Votes cast	%	Votes cast	%
David Lewis	661	38.9%	715	42.5%	742	44.1%	1046	63.1%
James Laxer	378	22.3%	407	24.1%	508	30.2%	612	36.9%
John Paul Harney	299	17.6%	347	20.5%	431	25.6%		
Ed Broadbent	236	13.9%	223	13.1%				
Frank Howard	124	7.3%						
Total	1,698	100.0%	1,692	100.0%	1,681	100.0%	1,658	100.0%

== Aftermath ==
The media attention that the Waffle, and its candidate, James Laxer, received, before and during the vote, partially explains the closest federal NDP leadership election up to that time. Lewis' perceived heavy-handed tactics in dealing with the Waffle at this and previous conventions had made him enough enemies to make the leadership campaign interesting. As well, Lewis was involved in most of the internal conflicts within the CCF/NDP during the previous 36 years, so the many members that felt his wrath as the party disciplinarian during this period, plotted their revenge against him. At his first press conference after winning the leadership, Lewis stated that he was not beholden to the Waffle, as they were soundly defeated on the floor, and he made no promises to them. He also took on the party's Quebec wing, stating that they could continue to theorize about possible self-determination resolutions, but come election time, they must pledge themselves to the party's newly confirmed federalist policy. He did not purge the Waffle from the NDP, instead leaving it to his son Stephen to do in June 1972, when the party's Ontario wing resolved to disband the Waffle, or kick its members out of the party if they did not comply with the disbanding order.

In the 1972 federal election campaign, the NDP finally made a breakthrough, winning 31 seats in the House of Commons, including one for John Harney, and holding the balance of power. However, within two years, the party faced a setback when it won only 16 seats in the 1974 federal election. Lewis, Howard, and Harney lost their seats and ended their federal careers as active politicians. Lewis resigned, finally informing the public that he had been fighting cancer for the past two years. Broadbent, became the leader in the House of Commons until a new leader was elected. In the end, the real winner of 1971 convention was Ed Broadbent. Although he was unsuccessful for his run at the leadership in 1971, it was a prelude to his winning the leadership at the next convention, and without the internecine divisiveness that the Waffle introduced at this convention.
