= 1972 Canadian federal election =

- October 30, 1972

264 seats in the House of Commons 133 seats needed for a majority
- Opinion polls
- Turnout: 76.7% (▲1.0 pp)
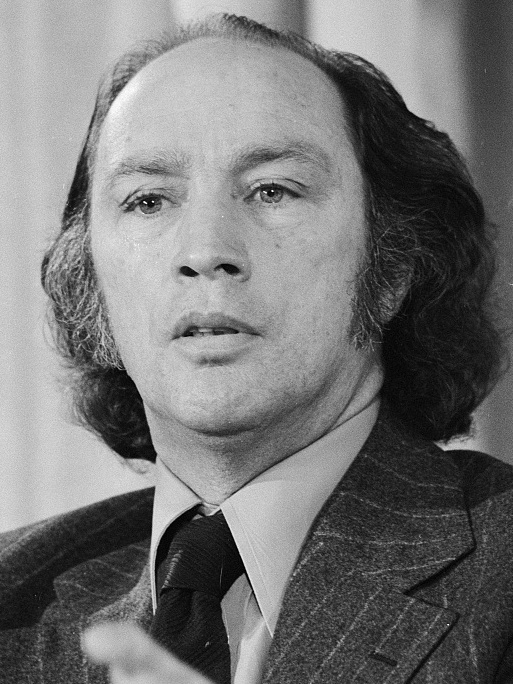

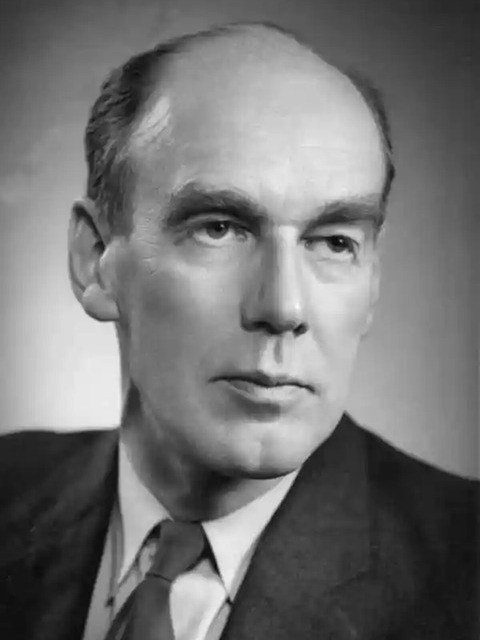

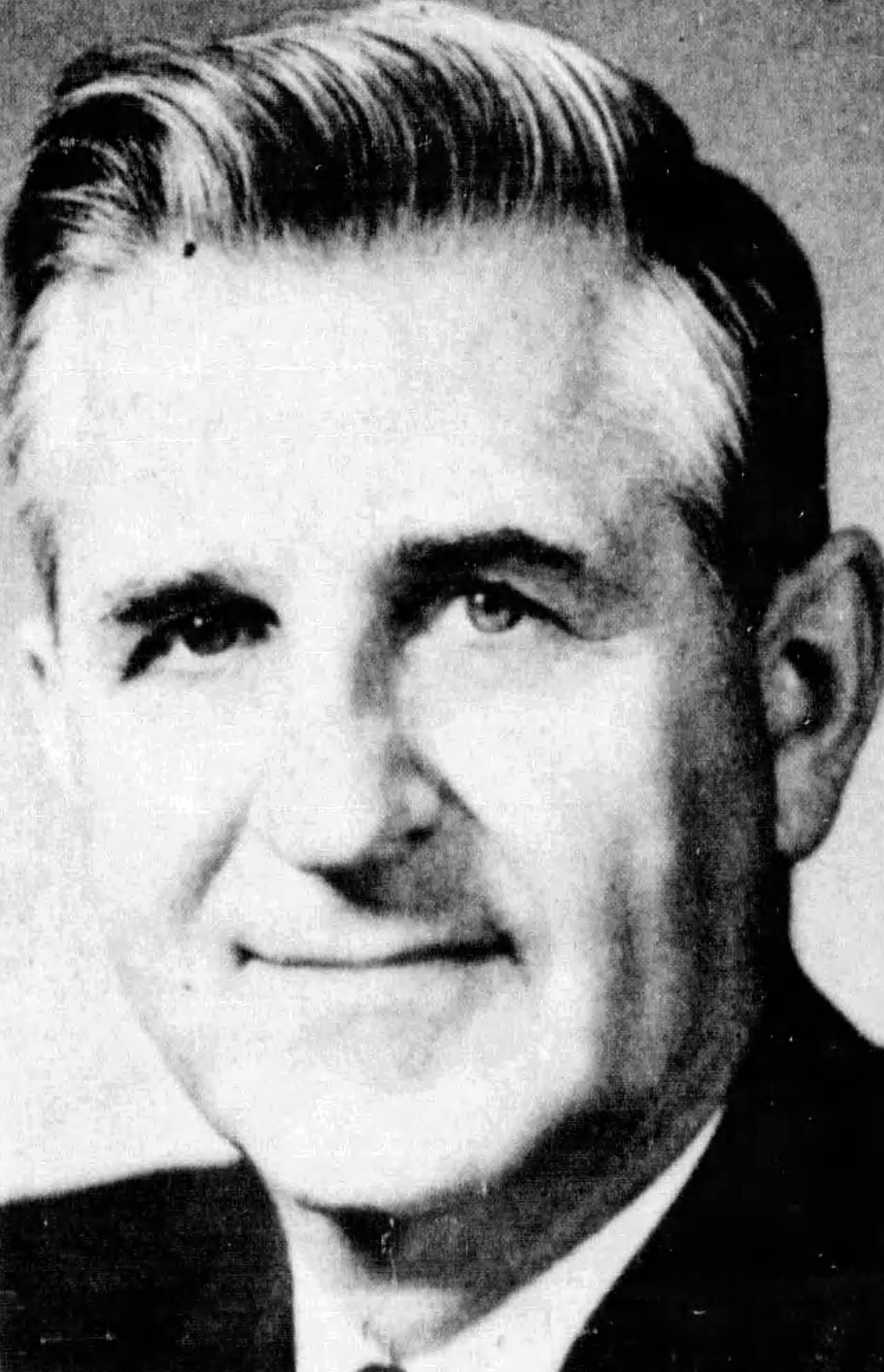

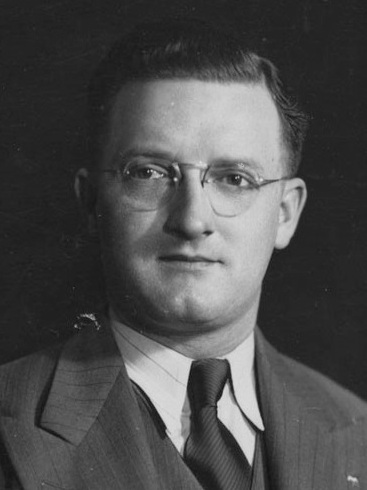
	First party	Second party
Leader	Pierre Trudeau	Robert Stanfield
Party	Liberal	Progressive Conservative
Leader since	April 6, 1968	September 9, 1967
Leader's seat	Mount Royal	Halifax
Last election	155 seats, 45.49%	72 seats, 31.36%
Seats before	147	73
Seats won	109	107
Seat change	▼38	▲34
Popular vote	3,717,804	3,388,980
Percentage	38.42%	35.02%
Swing	▼7.07 pp	▲3.59 pp
	Third party	Fourth party
Leader	David Lewis	Réal Caouette
Party	New Democratic	Social Credit
Leader since	April 24, 1971	October 9, 1971
Leader's seat	York South	Témiscamingue
Last election	22 seats, 16.96%	14 seats, 5.28%^{1}
Seats before	25	15
Seats won	31	15
Seat change	▲6	0
Popular vote	1,725,719	730,759
Percentage	17.83%	7.55%
Swing	▲0.87 pp	▲2.27 pp
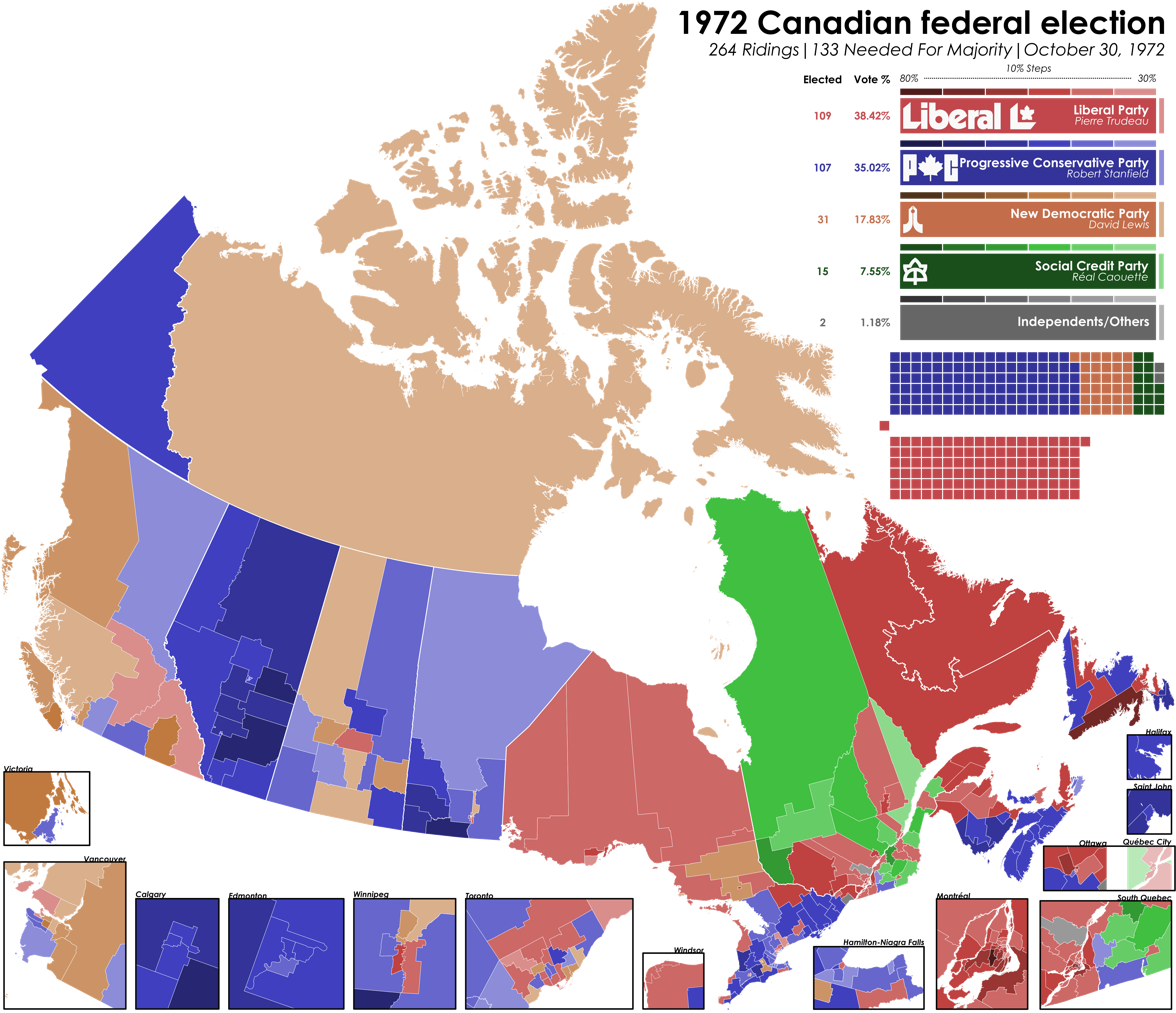

- The Canadian parliament after the 1972 election
Prime Minister before election
Pierre Trudeau
Liberal
Prime Minister after election
Pierre Trudeau
Liberal

The 1972 Canadian federal election was held on October 30, 1972, to elect members of the House of Commons of Canada of the 29th Parliament of Canada. It resulted in a slim victory for the governing Liberal Party led by Prime Minister Pierre Trudeau, which won 109 seats, compared to 107 seats for the opposition Progressive Conservatives led by Robert Stanfield, making this the closest election in Canadian history in terms of seat count. Trudeau's Liberals experienced a decline in support as a result of rising unemployment.

A further 48 seats were won by other parties and independents. On election night, the results appeared to give 109 seats to the Tories, but once the counting had finished the next day, the final results gave the Liberals a minority government and left the New Democratic Party led by David Lewis holding the balance of power.

This was the first national election held in Canada after the voting age was lowered from 21 to 18 in 1970. This was also the last election until 1997 in which more than three parties won enough seats to earn official party status in the House of Commons.

== Overview ==
The election was the second fought between Liberal leader, Prime Minister Pierre Trudeau, and Progressive Conservative leader Robert Stanfield. The Liberals entered the election campaign with a 10-point lead over the Progressive Conservatives, but the spirit of Trudeaumania had worn off, and a slumping economy and rising unemployment hurt his party. Stanfield's Tories tried to capitalize on the public's perception that the Liberals were mismanaging the economy with the slogan, "A Progressive Conservative government will do better."

The Liberals campaigned on the slogan, "The Land is Strong", and television ads illustrating Canada's scenery. The slogan quickly became much derided, and the party had developed few real issues to campaign on. As a result, their entire campaign was viewed as being one of the worst managed in recent decades.

The New Democratic Party, led by David Lewis, had been struggling in the polls for much of the previous year, following an acrimonious leadership contest in which Lewis had been elected as leader over hard-left candidate James Laxer, and subsequent internecine conflicts between the party establishment and the left-wing group The Waffle. In the lead-up to the election, however, the federal party received a morale boost when the British Columbia New Democratic Party, under the leadership of Dave Barrett, unseated the long-standing provincial Social Credit government of W. A. C. Bennett in a major political upset. Additionally, Lewis' reputation as a moderate helped win over Liberal voters who were dissatisfied with Trudeau's government.

=== Party platforms ===
Liberal Party:

- increase bilingualism in the Canadian civil service;
- re-introduce a bill controlling foreign take-overs of Canadian businesses;
- specialized programs to reduce unemployment;
- a program to expand and create new parks across Canada, including Toronto's "Harbourfront" and Mont-Sainte-Anne near Quebec City;
- make-work programs to create jobs;
- reduce abuse of Unemployment Insurance; and
- incentives to reduce pollution.

Progressive Conservative Party:

- increase the discipline in government spending, and increase the power of the Auditor General of Canada to fight waste and inefficiency in government;
- ban strikes in essential services;
- introduce price and wage controls if necessary to control inflation;
- require foreign-owned companies operating in Canada to have a majority of Canadians on their boards of directors;
- introduce an incentive to encourage Canadians to invest in small businesses;
- develop a national economic strategy in co-operation with the provincial governments;
- expand re-training opportunities for unemployed workers;
- adjust tariffs to encourage secondary processing in Canada of Canada's natural resources;
- eliminate the 11% sales tax on building materials;
- eliminate 3% increase in personal income tax rates scheduled for January 1, 1973, and reduce rates by 4% on July 1, 1973;
- adjust old age security payments regularly to reflect changes in the cost of living;
- index tax brackets to inflation so that taxes do not rise as the cost of living rises;
- provide assistance to set up residential land banks to reduce the cost of housing.

New Democratic Party:

- eliminate 3% increase in personal income tax rates scheduled for January 1, 1973, and reduce rates by 8% for ordinary Canadians;
- introduce controls on prices and rents, but not on wages;
- create a $430 million program to fund public works during winter months to reduce unemployment;
- increase old age security payments, but eliminate them for wealthy senior citizens;
- legislate greater autonomy for Canadian trade unions that are branches of international unions;
- tough tax laws for corporations;
- eliminate "corporate welfare", i.e., grants and subsidies for corporations, and use this money to build housing and transportation infrastructure, and fund municipal services to create jobs.

Social Credit Party:

- reform the monetary system in line with social credit theories;
- increase old age security payments to $200 per month beginning at age 60, and to $150 per month for spouses of seniors regardless of age.

== National results ==
The voter turn-out was 76.7%.

One independent candidate was elected: Roch La Salle was re-elected in the Quebec riding of Joliette. La Salle had left the PC caucus to protest the party's failure to recognize what he considered Quebec's right to self-determination, and was the only candidate to win the support of the separatist Parti Québécois. He returned to the PC caucus in 1974.

One candidate with no affiliation was elected: Lucien Lamoureux, in the Ontario riding of Stormont—Dundas. Lamoureux, originally elected as a Liberal, had been serving as Speaker of the House of Commons. He ran without affiliation in order to preserve his impartiality as Speaker. He retired after this Parliament, and did not run again in 1974.

The Liberals won a minority government, with the New Democratic Party holding the balance of power. Requiring NDP support to continue, the Trudeau government would move left politically, including the creation of Petro-Canada.

This was the first of two elections in which Réal Caouette led the national Social Credit Party of Canada. Caouette, who had contested the previous two elections as leader of the breakaway Quebec-based Ralliement créditiste, had successfully taken over the leadership of the original western-based party and overseen the reintegration of the two factions. He successfully held on to the seats he had previously won under the RC banner, but these were the only ridings Social Credit managed to win as it continued to lose support outside Quebec.

Party	Party leader	# of candidates	Seats				Popular vote		
Party	Party leader	# of candidates	1968	Dissol.	Elected	% Change	#	%	Change
Liberal	Pierre Trudeau	263	155	147	109	-29.7%	3,717,804	38.42%	-7.07pp
Progressive Conservative	Robert Stanfield	264	72	73	107	+48.6%	3,388,980	35.02%	+3.59pp
New Democratic Party	David Lewis	252	22	25	31	+40.9%	1,725,719	17.83%	+0.87pp
Social Credit^{1}	Real Caouette	164	14	15	15	+7.1%	730,759	7.55%	+2.27pp
Independent^{2}		53	1	2	1	-	56,685	0.59%	+0.14pp
No affiliation^{3}		26			1		23,938	0.25%	
Unknown		93			-		32,013	0.33%	
Rhinoceros^{4}	Cornelius I	1	-	-	-	-	1,565	0.02%	+0.02pp
Vacant				4					
Total		1,117	264	264	264	-0.4%	9,677,463	100%	
Sources: Elections Canada;History of Federal Ridings since 1867; Toronto Star, October 30, 1972

Notes:

"% change" refers to change from previous election

^{1} Indicates increase from total Social Credit + Ralliement creditiste seats/vote in 1968.

^{2} Roch LaSalle, who was elected in 1968 as a Progressive Conservative, won re-election as an independent.

^{3} Lucien Lamoureux who was elected as a Liberal but served as Speaker of the House, won re-election with no party affiliation.

^{4} The Rhinoceros Party ran a total of 12 candidates, but because it was not recognized by Elections Canada as a registered party, its candidates were listed as independents.

== Vote and seat summaries ==
Ternary plots - shift of electoral support (1968-1972)
1968

1972
Electoral districts identified by colours of winning parties

Popular vote
Liberal	38.42%
PC	35.02%
NDP	17.83%
Social Credit	7.55%
Others	1.18%

Seat totals
Liberal	41.28%
PC	40.53%
NDP	11.74%
Social Credit	5.68%
Independent	0.75%

== Results by province ==
Party name		BC	AB	SK	MB	ON	QC	NB	NS	PE	NL	NT	YK	Total
Liberal	Seats:	4	-	1	2	36	56	5	1	1	3	-	-	109
Liberal	Popular Vote:	28.9	25.0	25.3	30.9	38.2	48.9	43.1	33.9	40.5	44.8	29.3	32.2	38.4
Progressive Conservative	Seats:	8	19	7	8	40	2	5	10	3	4	-	1	107
Progressive Conservative	Vote:	33.0	57.6	36.9	41.6	39.1	17.4	46.8	53.4	51.9	49.0	30.9	53.0	35.0
New Democratic Party	Seats:	11	-	5	3	11	-	-	-	-	-	1	-	31
New Democratic Party	Vote:	35.0	12.6	35.9	26.3	21.5	6.8	6.3	12.3	7.5	4.7	39.8	11.6	17.8
Social Credit	Seats:	-	-	-	-	-	15	-	-	-	-			15
Social Credit	Vote:	2.6	4.5	1.8	0.7	0.4	24.3	3.2	0.3	0.1	0.2			7.6
Independent	Seats:	-	-	-	-	-	1	-			-		-	1
Independent	Vote:	0.2	xx	xx	0.1	0.2	1.7	0.3			0.4		3.1	0.6
No affiliation	Seats:	-	-	-	-	1	-		-					1
No affiliation	Vote:	xx	0.1	xx	xx	0.5	0.2		xx					0.2
Total seats:		23	19	13	13	88	74	10	11	4	7	1	1	264
Parties that won no seats:
Unknown	Vote:	0.1	0.2	0.1	0.3	0.1	0.7	0.4	0.1		0.9			0.3
Rhinoceros	Vote:						0.1							xx

xx - less than 0.05% of the popular vote

== See also ==
- 29th Canadian Parliament
- List of Canadian federal general elections
- List of political parties in Canada
- Progressive Conservative Party of Canada candidates in the 1972 Canadian federal election
- Social Credit Party of Canada candidates, 1972 Canadian federal election
