= Socialist Party of Ontario =

The Socialist Party of Ontario is the name of two minor political parties in provincial history that advocated socialism. The first iteration of the party, which existed from 1903 to 1925, was initially affiliated with the Canadian Socialist League and, after 1905, with the Socialist Party of Canada. The second iteration existed from 2011 to 2016 and was created by disaffected members of the New Democratic Party.

== Socialist Party (1903) ==
The first Socialist Party of Ontario was founded in 1903 at a convention attended by about 50 Ontario members of the Canadian Socialist League who constituted themselves as the Socialist Party of Ontario. The SPO was somewhat more radical than its Manitoba counterpart, with its programme accepting ameliorative reform measures in general terms as "democratic and therefore socialist" while foregoing the construction of a simplistic list of such measures desired. Instead, the SPO set for itself 'the object of conquering the power of governments and using them for the purpose of transforming the present system of private distribution into the collective ownership of all the people'. The CSL proved to be short-lived, with its members joining the Socialist Party of Canada early in 1905.

=== Election results ===
The party ran in Ontario provincial elections from 1902 until 1919. The Socialist Party of Canada dissolved in 1925. One candidate ran as a Socialist in the 1934 election, buy may have either been self-declared or aligned with the Socialist Party of Canada (WSM), a separate group that formed in 1931:

Election results
Election year	No. of overall votes	% of overall total	No. of candidates run	No. of seats won	Presence
1902	1,993	0.46%	9	0 / 98	Extra-parliamentary
1905	1,273	0.29%	7	0 / 98	Extra-parliamentary
1908	3,129	0.69%	13	0 / 106	Extra-parliamentary
1911	3,206	0.87%	7	0 / 106	Extra-parliamentary
1914	4,532	0.91%	12	0 / 111	Extra-parliamentary
1919	637	0.05%	3	0 / 111	Extra-parliamentary
1934	81	0.01%	1	0 / 90	Extra-parliamentary

== Socialist Party (2011) ==
Socialist Party of Ontario
- Unregistered provincial party
- Chairperson: Michael Laxer
- Spokesperson: Natalie Lochwin, Jan Maxwell
- Founded: 2011
- Dissolved: 2016
- Split from: Ontario New Democratic Party
- Ideology: Democratic socialism
- Political position: Left-wing
- Colours: Yellow, Red

Website
- http://socialistpartyofontario.blogspot.ca

The Socialist Party of Ontario (SPO) was a socialist political party in the Canadian province of Ontario from 2011 until 2016. The SPO was founded in 2011 by political activists, trade unionists, community leaders, feminists and socialists, many of whom were former members of the Ontario New Democratic Party (NDP) who sought to challenge the NDP's perceived shift to the centre of the political spectrum. Modeled after Québec solidaire and the United Left Alliance in Ireland, the party adopted the name of the historic Socialist Party of Canada, though maintained no connections to the former entity. The party fielded five candidates in the October 2011 Ontario general election and two candidates in the 2014 Ontario general election. Following the 2014 vote, the party became inactive and, in 2016, was de-registered by Elections Ontario.

=== History ===
On 28 May 2011, the Socialist Party of Ontario was formed at a founding convention in Toronto. Its constitution and preliminary policy platform were voted on and passed, maintaining a socialist preamble in its constitution that was inspired by the Regina Manifesto of the defunct Co-operative Commonwealth Federation. The Party had a collective leadership, with no single member functioning as the traditional "party leader". In place of a leader, the party operated with two spokespeople, one male and one female, and, at its founding, elected Jan Maxwell and Michael Laxer to these positions. Laxer was named chair of the party executive to fulfill Elections Ontario's requirements to designate a "Leader" and a "President". The party registered with Elections Ontario on September 13, 2011.

The SPO nominated five candidates in the 2011 provincial election Its first candidate, Dr. Ken Ranney, was nominated by the party to run in Peterborough on 31 August 2011. Subsequently, the party nominated candidates in Etobicoke–Lakeshore, Leeds–Grenville, St. Paul's, and Trinity–Spadina.

For the 2014 election, the SPO nominated two candidates, Andrea Quiano in Peterborough and Natalie Lochwin in Etobicoke—Lakeshore. For the election, the party nominated Lochwin to serve as spokesperson. The party's share of the popular vote decreased and, overall, the SPO placed 19th out of the 21 parties and independents running in the election.

Immediately following the 2014 provincial election, the party fell into a state of disarray and no longer updated its website. By late 2016, the SPO was de-registered by Elections Ontario. The party's name was re-reserved with Elections Ontario in May 2016, but the reservation was voided following a year of inactivity by the party's activists. No effort was to resurrect the party for the 2018 provincial election.

=== Election results ===
Election year	# of overall votes	% of overall total	# of candidates run	# of seats won	+/–	Government
2011	519	0.01	5	0 / 107	New Party	Extra-parliamentary
2014	368	0.01	2	0 / 107	0	Extra-parliamentary
