= Statement of Principles (NDP) =

1983 Canadian political manifesto

The New Democratic Party's Statement of Principles was adopted in 1983 in Regina, Saskatchewan, Canada, at the 12th Federal NDP Convention. It replaced the Winnipeg Declaration, which had in turn replaced the original Regina Manifesto of 1933 of the Co-operative Commonwealth Federation (CCF) (the predecessor to the NDP).

The preamble reads as follows:

The New Democratic Party believes that the pursuit of peace and democratic socialism are the two imperatives of a more secure and just modern world.

We believe that as peace must prevail over war, so must cooperation and mutual responsibility prevail over private gain and competition as the guiding principles of social and economic life. We seek a compassionate and caring society, servicing the needs of all.

The New Democratic Party is proud to be part of that great worldwide movement of democratic socialist parties which have always striven to replace oppression and privilege with democracy and equality.

== See also ==
- 1933 Regina Manifesto
- 1956 Winnipeg Declaration
- 1969 Manifesto for an Independent Socialist Canada
