= Opinion polling for the 1972 Canadian federal election =

This article is about polls leading up to the 1972 Canadian federal election.

== During the 28th Parliament of Canada ==
Evolution of voting intentions at national level
Polling firm	Last day of survey	Source	LPC	PC	NDP	Other	ME	Sample
Election 1972	October 30, 1972		38.42	35.02	17.83	8.74		
Complan Research Associates	October 16, 1972		46	31	23	—	—	—
Market Opinion Research	October 14, 1972		35	28-29	20	—	—	1,500
Peter Regenstreif	October 1972		45	30	19	6	—	—
Gallup	September 19, 1972		44	31	21	4	4.0	722
Oliver Quayle	September 1972		42	33	21	4	—	800
Gallup	August 1972		42	32	15	11	—	—
Gallup	June 1972		39	35	17	9	—	—
Gallup	May 1972		39	35	19	7	—	—
Gallup	February 1972		40	30	22	8	—	—
Gallup	December 1971		37	33	21	9	—	—
Gallup	October 1971		38	32	23	7	—	—
Gallup	August 1971		42	24	24	10	—	—
Gallup	June 1971		44	26	24	6	—	—
Gallup	May 1971		42	28	23	7	—	—
Gallup	February 1971		51	24	17	8	—	—
Gallup	December 1970		59	22	13	6	—	—
Gallup	October 1970		42	31	20	7	—	—
Gallup	August 1970		47	27	19	7	—	—
Gallup	June 1970		47	26	20	7	—	—
Gallup	April 1970		40	28	22	10	—	—
Gallup	February 1970		43	27	19	11	—	—
Gallup	November 1969		42	28	20	10	—	—
Gallup	October 1969		40	29	24	9	—	—
Gallup	August 1969		39	29	24	8	—	—
Gallup	June 1969		41	30	22	7	—	—
Gallup	April 1969		47	28	18	7	—	—
Gallup	February 1969		51	27	15	7	—	—
Gallup	November 1968		52	27	14	7	—	—
Gallup	September 1968		46	32	16	8	—	—
Election 1968	June 25, 1968		45.37	31.43	16.96	6.24		
