= Progressive Conservative Party of Canada candidates in the 1972 Canadian federal election =

The Progressive Conservative Party of Canada fielded a full slate of candidates in the 1972 federal election, and won 107 of 264 seats to remain as the Official Opposition in the House of Commons of Canada. Many of the party's candidates have their own biography pages; information about others may be found here.

== Ontario ==
=== Nickel Belt: Bernie White ===
Bernie White was an assessor. He received 3,817 votes (12.52%), finishing third against New Democratic Party candidate John Rodriguez.
