= Robert Laxer =

Canadian psychologist, professor, author, and political activist

- Born: Menachem Mendel Laxer; September 10, 1915; Montreal, Quebec
- Died: October 24, 1998 (aged 83); Toronto, Ontario
- Resting place: Toronto Necropolis
- Other name: Robert Owen
- Education: McGill University; University of Toronto
- Occupations: Psychologist, professor, political activist
- Political party: New Democratic Party
- Other political affiliations: Communist Party of Canada; Labor-Progressive Party
- Spouse: Edna May Quentin (Quirmbach)
- Children: James Laxer, Gordon Laxer, Linda Laxer
- Relatives: Michael Laxer (grandchild)

Military service
- Allegiance: Canada
- Branch/service: Canadian Army
- Years of service: 1941-1947
- Battles/wars: World War 2

Robert Mendel Laxer (September 10, 1915 – October 24, 1998) was a Canadian psychologist, professor, author, and political activist.

== Life and career ==
Laxer was born in Montreal, Quebec, in 1915 to Rabbi Getzel Laxer (1878-1942), who worked as a shohet and emigrated to Canada in 1900 from Bukovina in the Austro-Hungarian Empire, and Freda Laxer (née Simak, 1880-1956). Robert Laxer graduated from McGill University with a Bachelor of Arts degree in 1936 and a Master of Arts degree in 1939.

Laxer joined the Communist Party of Canada during the Great Depression. In 1940, he married Edna May Quentin, a social worker and daughter of a Methodist minister.

He worked as a freelance journalist until 1941 when he joined the Canadian Army and served during the Second World War. Upon returning to Canada in 1947, he became a paid organizer for the Communist Party's successor, the Labor-Progressive Party. Following the Twentieth Party Congress of the Communist Party of the Soviet Union, the accusations by Nikita Khrushchev of crimes by Joseph Stalin, and the 1956 Soviet invasion of Hungary, Laxer joined many other disillusioned Communists in resigning from the party.

He returned to school and ultimately obtained a doctorate in clinical and learning psychology from the University of Toronto. From 1960 to 1964, he was a lecturer in the University of Toronto's department of psychology and a clinical psychologist at Toronto General Hospital.

He then taught at York University, and later became an associate professor at the Ontario Institute for Studies in Education and became a full professor in 1968.

In 1969, he joined his son, James Laxer, and Mel Watkins to form the Waffle, a socialist group within the New Democratic Party. Through the 1970s, he wrote numerous articles and books advocating Canadian economic independence from the United States and, in particular, Canadian ownership of the oil industry. He was appointed by Pierre Trudeau to the board of directors of Petro-Canada which had been created as a state-owned crown corporation, in part, due to Laxer's arguments.

In the 1980s, Laxer was active in the Council of Canadians, the peace movement, and as an opponent of the Canada–United States Free Trade Agreement.

Laxer had two sons, James and Gordon, both of whom were political economists and writers, and a daughter, Linda, a social worker and therapist. James' son Michael Laxer also became a political activist.
