= Social Credit Party of Canada candidates in the 1972 Canadian federal election =

The Social Credit Party of Canada fielded 164 candidates in the 1972 federal election, and won 15 seats to remain as the fourth-largest party in the House of Commons of Canada. Some of the party's candidates have their own biography pages; information about others may be found here.

== Ontario ==
=== Nickel Belt: Donat Breault ===
Donat Breault was a miner. He received 534 votes (1.75%), finishing in fourth place against New Democratic Party candidate John Rodriguez. During the 1990s, a man named Donat Breault published two short works entitled Culottes courtes et pieds nus (1992) and La Beauté de ma retraite (1998) through the Centre Franco-Ontarien de ressources en alphabétisation. It is assumed that this is the same person.
