= Regina Manifesto =

1933 Canadian socialist manifesto

The Regina Manifesto was the programme of the Co-operative Commonwealth Federation (CCF) and was adopted at the first national convention of the CCF held in Regina, Saskatchewan, in 1933. The primary goal of the Regina Manifesto was to eradicate the system of capitalism and replace it with a planned socialist economy. The CCF was a Canadian democratic socialist party founded in 1932 by farmers, workers, and socialist groups against the backdrop of the Great Depression.

The manifesto was largely written by members of the League for Social Reconstruction, particularly Frank Underhill and F. R. Scott, and called for "a planned and socialized economy in which our natural resources and principal means of production and distribution are owned, controlled and operated by the people." Specifically it called for the nationalization of transportation, communications, electrical power and other services. It called for a planned economy and a national banking system that would be "removed from the control of private profit-seeking interests." It advocated the ability to organize in trade unions and called for a National Labour Code "to secure for the worker maximum income and leisure, insurance covering illness, accident, old age, and unemployment". The Regina Manifesto proposed social service programs such as publicly funded health care, supported peace, promoted co-operative enterprises, and vowed that "No C.C.F. Government will rest content until it has eradicated capitalism and put into operation the full programme of socialized planning which will lead to the establishment in Canada of the Cooperative Commonwealth." Such restructuring of society has not been achieved, leading some to ascribe utopian aspects to the Manifesto.

The Regina Manifesto remained the CCF's official programme until 1956 when, in the face of the strong anti-communist sentiment of the Cold War, it was replaced by the more moderate Winnipeg Declaration which substituted Keynesian economics for socialist remedies.

== See also ==
- Winnipeg Declaration (1956)
- Manifesto for an Independent Socialist Canada (1969)
- Statement of Principles (NDP) (1983)
