= Michael Laxer =

Canadian political activist (born 1970)

- Born: 1970 (age 55–56); Toronto, Ontario, Canada
- Occupations: Activist; businessperson
- Political party: Socialist Party of Ontario (2011—2016); New Democratic Party (before 2011)
- Relatives: James Laxer (father); Robert Laxer (grandfather)

Michael Laxer (born 1970) is a Canadian political activist and the former chairperson of the Socialist Party of Ontario.

== Background ==
Laxer lives in the Toronto neighbourhood of Long Branch, in Etobicoke, where he and his wife own and operate a used book store, the only independent used bookstore in south Etobicoke until it closed its bricks and mortar operation at the end of 2015, becoming an online bookstore. He is the son of writer, political scientist, professor, and former NDP leadership candidate James Laxer and grandson of Robert Laxer.

== Politics ==
He was a candidate for the New Democratic Party (NDP) in the 2000 federal election in the riding of Scarborough—Agincourt, and for the Ontario NDP during the 2003 provincial election in Scarborough Centre. Laxer was also an unsuccessful candidate for Toronto City Council in Ward 6 (Etobicoke-Lakeshore) in the 2010 municipal election.

In 2008, he criticized the $15,000 entrance fee for the Ontario NDP leadership election as being too high saying, "What you get by doing that is you manifestly limit the number of people who are outside the party establishment, and who have available big backers of one kind or another."

Laxer subsequently began the Ginger Project calling for the Ontario NDP (ONDP) to issue a comprehensive manifesto of policies and build support for their ideas rather than put all their resources into winning marginal ridings. In an open letter to ONDP leader Andrea Horwath, Laxer wrote:

Many party members had reservations relating to the "push to win" strategy that prioritized certain ridings for party resources at the expense of others. We feel that this strategy should be abandoned, as it has failed to produce any tangible results during an election. The NDP should instead adopt a policy that ensures each riding association has the ability to reach every household in their riding at least once during an election campaign. We should force the other parties to have to engage us seriously in every riding in the province.

He and the Ginger Project left the NDP in 2011 due to its cancellation of a policy convention and what they viewed as the silencing of left-wingers telling the Toronto Star, "I was surprised that they would not have a policy convention prior to an election." Laxer was one of two official spokespersons of the Socialist Party of Ontario from 2011 to 2012 and was the party's chairperson.

In 2010 and 2014 Laxer ran for City Councillor in Toronto's Ward 6 Etobicoke—Lakeshore receiving 717 votes in his first effort and 305 in his second.

Laxer is a social activist who opposes men's rights groups because he believes men's rights movement is a vocal opponent of feminism. In 2015, he told the Toronto Star he had been encouraging people to fight the Canadian Association for Equality's inclusion at the LGBT Pride parade, because he believed allowing men’s rights groups to walk would "legitimize them and mainstream misogyny".

== Election results ==
2014 Toronto election, Ward 6
Candidate	Votes	%
Mark Grimes	11337	43.96
Russ Ford	8791	34.08
Tony Vella	2718	10.54
Miroslaw Jankielewicz	1114	4.32
Sean O'Callaghan	501	1.94
Peggy Moulder	398	1.54
Michael Laxer	305	1.18
Everett Sheppard	221	0.86
Ruthmary James	169	0.66
Robert Sysak	90	0.35
John Letonja	84	0.33
Dave Searle	64	0.25
Total	25,792	100.00

2010 Toronto election, Ward 6
Candidate	Votes	%
Mark Grimes	12,228	60.4
Jem Cain	5,847	28.9
Michael Laxer	717	3.5
Wendell Brereton	605	3.0
Cecilia Luu	466	2.3
David Searle	375	1.9
Total	20,238	100%
