= Manifesto for an Independent Socialist Canada =

The Manifesto for an Independent Socialist Canada was a document drafted by a leftist faction of Canada's New Democratic Party, known as the Waffle, in 1969. When that group briefly left the NDP between 1972 and 1974, it became their party's main programmatic statement.

== Manifesto positions ==
The Manifesto for an Independent Socialist Canada is also known as the Waffle Manifesto. It outlined the Waffle's deep resentment of the "American Empire" and the organization's commitment to furthering the socialist cause in Canada within the template of a successful democracy. The manifesto also included the Waffle movement's feeling toward Quebec sovereignty.

The Manifesto helped contribute to a debate on American control of the Canadian economy and particularly the extent of US ownership of Canadian business and resources and the emergence in Canada of a branch plant economy. The Liberal government of Prime Minister Pierre Trudeau instituted attempts to assert domestic economic control such as the creation of Petro-Canada, meant to assert Canadian control of the energy sector, and the Foreign Investment Review Agency, intended to review and limit foreign ownership and particularly American takeovers of Canadian companies. These measures were introduced in part due to pressure by the NDP, particularly during the minority government that followed the 1972 election. The NDP, in turn, had urged these measures in part due to pressure by the Waffle within the party.

== History ==
After 1974, when the Waffle's party, Movement for an Independent Socialist Canada, disbanded, the Manifesto for an Independent Socialist Canada became a historical document. The name of the NDP's Socialist Caucus's Manifesto for a Socialist Canada is an echo of the earlier document's influence.

== See also ==
- Regina Manifesto (1933)
- Winnipeg Declaration (1956)
