= Winnipeg Declaration =

Manifesto of the Co-operative Commonwealth Federation

The Winnipeg Declaration, sometimes referred to as the Winnipeg Manifesto, was the programme adopted by the Co-operative Commonwealth Federation (CCF) in Canada to replace the Regina Manifesto. Its full name is the "1956 Winnipeg Declaration of Principles of the Co-operative Commonwealth Federation," and it was adopted at the party's national convention held that year in Winnipeg, Manitoba.

== Evolution of party ==
The declaration reflected the evolution of the party from socialism to a more moderate form of social democracy and democratic socialism since its founding during the Great Depression. It also reflected the increased pragmatism that had coloured the party since it took power in the province of Saskatchewan. The anticommunist mood of the Cold War also caused the CCF to seek to moderate its stance. The CCF federal vice-president and future New Democratic Party leader, David Lewis, was instrumental in drafting the document and having it approved.

== From nationalization to mixed economy ==
The Regina Manifesto called for a socialist economy in which major sectors of the economy would be nationalized and placed under public control, but the Winnipeg Declaration called for a mixed economy in which "there will be an important role for public, private and co-operative enterprise working together in the people's interest" and also moderated earlier demands for a planned economy. The Regina Manifesto declared that the CCF would not rest until capitalism was "eradicated," but the Winnipeg Declaration affirmed, "The CCF will not rest content until every person in this land and in all other lands is able to enjoy equality and freedom, a sense of human dignity, and an opportunity to live a rich and meaningful life as a citizen of a free and peaceful world."

== Statement of principles ==
The Winnipeg Declaration remained the basic statement of party principles of the CCF and its successor, the New Democratic Party, until 1983 when it was replaced by the Statement of Principles.
