= Mel Watkins =

Canadian political economist (1932–2020)

- Born: Melville Henry Watkins; May 15, 1932; McKellar, Ontario, Canada
- Died: April 2, 2020 (aged 87); Ottawa, Ontario
- Known for: Cofounding the Waffle, Watkins Report
- Political party: New Democratic Party
- Spouse: Kelly Crichton

Academic background
- Influences: Walter L. Gordon, Harold Innis; Kari Polanyi Levitt; Hyman Minsky; John Maynard Keynes

Academic work
- Discipline: Economics; political science
- Sub-discipline: Political economy
- School or tradition: Canadian nationalism; socialism
- Institutions: University College, Toronto
- Influenced: James Laxer, Peter Gzowski

Melville Henry Watkins (May 15, 1932 – April 2, 2020) was a Canadian political economist and activist and professor emeritus of economics and political science at the University of Toronto. He was a founder and co-leader with James Laxer of the Waffle, a left-wing political formation within the New Democratic Party that advocated an "independent socialist Canada" and Canadian nationalism. He was appointed a Member of the Order of Canada in 2019.

== Life and career ==
Watkins was born on May 15, 1932, on a farm near McKellar, Ontario; one of six children born to Wilmot and Sadie Watkins. At the age of 16, he and his twin brother, Murray, enrolled at the University of Toronto where among his lecturers was Harold Innis, whose staples thesis became a lifelong influence on his thinking. He pursued graduate work as a classical economist at the Massachusetts Institute of Technology. He became a professor of economics at the University of Toronto in 1958 and, in 1963, published an academic article, "A Staple Theory of Economic Growth", which revised and updated Innis's staples thesis and was influential in the growing Canadian economic nationalist movement and also brought him to the attention of Canadian finance minister Walter L. Gordon.

Watkins' political activity followed his work heading up the federal government's Task Force on Foreign Ownership and the Structure of Canadian Investment, which investigated the impact of growing American control of the Canadian economy. Striking this task force of economists had been urged upon the Pearson government by former Liberal finance minister Walter Gordon. The "Watkins Report", as it was widely known, was issued in 1968 and recommended strict regulation of foreign investment in Canada, particularly foreign ownership of Canadian businesses and resources. Its findings led to the establishment of the Canada Development Corporation to help facilitate greater Canadian ownership as well as the Foreign Investment Review Agency to regulate foreign ownership.

Watkins' concern for Canadian economic sovereignty led him to join others in 1969 to found the Waffle, which issued a Manifesto for an Independent Socialist Canada calling for increased public ownership of the economy as a means of securing Canadian independence from the United States, as well as establishing social and economic equity. The group was essentially expelled from the New Democratic Party (NDP) in 1972 and while Watkins supported the group's attempt to form a new left-wing political party, the Movement for an Independent Socialist Canada, his interest and involvement waned, particularly when he left to spend time in the far north to investigate the living conditions of the Dene people. After the collapse of the Waffle in 1974, Watkins spent most of his time teaching and writing.

In the early 1970s, Watkins was hired by the Dene Nation (then known as the Indian Brotherhood of the Northwest Territories) as the economic adviser for their delegation to the Mackenzie Valley Pipeline Inquiry.

In the 1980s and 1990s, Watkins was active in opposition to the Canada–United States Free Trade Agreement and then to the North American Free Trade Agreement describing them as "charters of rights for corporations."

He eventually rejoined the NDP, and ran as its candidate in Beaches—East York in the 1997 and 2000 federal elections. He placed second on both occasions behind Liberal Maria Minna.

Watkins supported the New Politics Initiative, which was formed in 2001 to attempt to convince the NDP to join with social movements to found a new left-wing party. He retired from academia and moved to Constance Bay in eastern Ontario, where he continued to write a column for This Magazine and pieces for other publications. He was also a board member of and regular contributor to the online newsmagazine Straight Goods. He also served as president of Science for Peace, and was a member of Pugwash Canada.

== Bibliography ==
- Madness & Ruin: Politics and the Economy in the Neoconservative Age (1992). ISBN 0-921284-64-0
- Canada Under Free Trade (1993). ISBN 1-55028-377-4
- Dene Nation: The Colony Within (1977). ISBN 0-8020-6315-2

== Electoral record ==
2000 Canadian federal election: Beaches—East York
Party	Candidate	Votes	%	±%	Expenditures
Liberal	Maria Minna	22,515	52.74	+4.81	$61,974
New Democratic	Mel Watkins	8,936	20.93	−2.61	$54,232
Progressive Conservative	Wayne Clutterbuck	5,766	13.51	+1.20	$13,989
Alliance	Abu Alam	3,838	8.99	−5.35	$9,047
Marijuana	Bruce Watson	682	1.60		none listed
Green	James Mendel	599	1.40	+0.11	$102
Canadian Action	Randall Whitcomb	128	0.30		none listed
Natural Law	Donalda Fredeen	88	0.21	-0.37	none listed
Communist	Ann Nicholson	82	0.19		$202
Marxist–Leninist	Steve Rutchinski	53	0.12		$8
Total valid votes		42,687	99.58		
Total rejected ballots		179	0.42	-0.23	
Turnout		42,866	56.94	-10.39	
Electors on the lists		75,284			
Liberal hold		Swing		+3.71	
Note: Canadian Alliance vote is compared to the Reform vote in 1997 election. Sources: Official Results, Elections Canada and Financial Returns, Elections Canada.

1997 Canadian federal election: Beaches—East York
Party	Candidate	Votes	%	±%
Liberal	Maria Minna	21,844	47.93	+5.79
New Democratic	Mel Watkins	10,730	23.55	+7.34
Reform	Gary Miller	6,534	14.34	-2.12
Progressive Conservative	Jack Simpson	5,611	12.31	+0.13
Green	John Scheer	589	1.20	
Natural Law	Donalda Fredeen	264	0.58	
Total valid votes		45,572	99.35	
Total rejected ballots		296	0.65	
Turnout		45,868	67.33	
Eligible voters		68,127		
Liberal notional hold		Swing		-0.77
