= James Laxer =

Canadian political economist, historian, public intellectual and political activist

- Born: James Robert Laxer; 22 December 1941; Montreal, Quebec, Canada
- Died: 23 February 2018 (aged 76); Paris, France
- Resting place: Toronto Necropolis
- Known for: Co-founding the Waffle
- Spouses: Diane Taylor (m. 1965; div. 1969); Krista Maeots (m. 1969; died 1978); Sandy Price (m. 1979)
- Children: Michael; Kate; Emily; Jonathan
- Parents: Edna May Quentin (Quirmbach); Robert Laxer

Academic background
- Education: University of Toronto; Queen's University
- Influences: Robert Laxer; George Grant

Academic work
- Discipline: Political science
- Sub-discipline: Political economy
- School or tradition: Democratic socialism; post-Keynesianism
- Institutions: York University
- Main interests: Canadian economic nationalism; American imperialism; Canada–US relations; globalization
- Notable works: Reckoning: The Political Economy of Canada (1986)

James Robert Laxer (22 December 1941 – 23 February 2018), also known as Jim Laxer, was a Canadian political economist, historian, public intellectual, and political activist who served as a professor at York University. Best known as co-founder of the Waffle, on whose behalf he ran for the leadership of the New Democratic Party in 1971, he was the author of more than two dozen books, mostly on Canadian political economy and history.

== Early life and family ==
Laxer was born in Montreal, Quebec, on 22 December 1941 and was the son of Edna May Quentin, a social worker, and Robert Laxer, a psychologist, professor, author, and political activist. His father was Jewish and his mother was from a Protestant family. Her father, Reverend A.P. Quentin, a missionary to China for 30 years, had changed the family name from Quirmbach around the time of World War I.

Both of Laxer's parents were members of the Communist Party of Canada and its public face, the Labor-Progressive Party, with Robert Laxer being a national organizer for the party. The Laxers left the party, along with many other members, following Khrushchev's Secret Speech revealing Joseph Stalin's crimes, and the 1956 Soviet invasion of Hungary. James Laxer wrote about his experiences growing up during this period in his memoir Red Diaper Baby: A Boyhood in the Age of McCarthyism. His father came to serve as a significant influence on his political worldview.

His paternal grandfather was a rabbi and his maternal grandfather was a minister and Christian missionary to China, where Laxer's mother was born. His brother, Gordon Laxer, became a political economist, author, and founder of the Parkland Institute.

He received a Bachelor of Arts degree from the University of Toronto and Master of Arts (following approval of his thesis French-Canadian Newspapers and Imperial Defence, 1899–1914 in 1967) and Doctor of Philosophy degrees from Queen's University. He was an active student journalist both at The Varsity at the University of Toronto and later at the Queen's Journal and was elected president of Canadian University Press in 1965.

Laxer married three times. He married Diane Taylor in 1965, from whom he was divorced in 1969. He married Krista Maeots in 1969. They had two children: Michael and Katherine (known as "Kate"). She was a producer at CBC Radio for This Country in the Morning with Peter Gzowski, and then created and was executive producer of CBC Radio's Morningside program with Don Harron. She committed suicide by drowning at Niagara Falls in 1978. Laxer and Maeots were separated at the time of her death in 1978. Laxer married Sandra Price in 1979. They had two children: Emily and Jonathan.

== Political career ==
In 1969, Laxer, along with his father Robert Laxer, Mel Watkins, and others, founded the Waffle, a left-wing group influenced by the New Left, the anti–Vietnam War movement, and Canadian economic nationalism, that tried to influence the direction of the New Democratic Party (NDP). Laxer was a principal author of their Manifesto for an Independent Socialist Canada in 1969 alongside Ed Broadbent and Gerald Caplan. The manifesto was debated at the 1969 federal NDP convention and was rejected by the delegates in favour of a more moderate declaration.

In 1971, Laxer ran for the leadership of the federal NDP and shocked the convention by winning one-third of the vote on the fourth and final ballot against party stalwart David Lewis. The Waffle was ultimately forced out of the NDP and briefly became a political party under the name Movement for an Independent Socialist Canada. Laxer and other Wafflers unsuccessfully ran for Parliament in 1974. This electoral failure led to the Waffle's demise, and Laxer concentrated on his work at York University, where he was a professor of political science for 47 years, and in broadcasting.

In 1981, he was hired as director of research for the federal NDP, but left in controversy in 1983 when he published a report critiquing the party's economic policy as being "out of date".

== Academic, writer, and broadcaster ==
Laxer hosted The Real Story, a nightly half-hour current affairs program on TVOntario in the early 1980s. He also variously wrote a column and op-ed pieces for the Toronto Star from the 1980s until shortly before his death, as well as op-ed pieces for The Globe and Mail. He also played "Talleyrand", a mock political insider, on CBC Radio's Morningside in the 1980s.

Laxer co-wrote and presented the five-part National Film Board documentary series Reckoning: The Political Economy of Canada in 1986, which examined Canada's economic and political relationships with the United States and Canada's place in the changing global economy. Laxer and his co-writer won a Gemini Award in 1988 for Best Writing in an Information/Documentary Program or Series for episode one of Reckoning titled "In Bed with an Elephant". The Canadian Broadcasting Corporation refused to air the series due to its critical view of free trade with the United States, which was being negotiated at the time, and it aired instead on TVOntario and other educational channels in Canada as well as a number of PBS stations in the United States.

A democratic socialist, Laxer believed that Canadian economic nationalism was a progressive force against the United States and American imperialism. He wrote extensively about the influence of American multinational corporations in the Canadian economy, particularly in the oil and gas industry, and his agitation helped lead to the creation of Petro-Canada. The creation of the Foreign Investment Review Agency, and the Canadian Development Corporation in the 1970s is also attributed in part to the work of Laxer, Watkins, and the Waffle. In the 1980s he strongly opposed the adoption of the Canada–US Free Trade Agreement, though he still believed that free trade agreements were capable of being used to the advantage of the political left through the entrenchment of social charters.

Laxer died suddenly and unexpectedly in Paris of heart-related problems on 23 February 2018 while in Europe researching a book on Canada's role in the Second World War.

== Selected works ==
- James Laxer (1970). The Energy Poker Game: The Politics of the Continental Resources Deal. New Press. ISBN 9780887700316.
- James Laxer (1974). Canada's Energy Crisis. James Lorimer & Company. ISBN 9780888620873.
- James Laxer and Anne Martin (1976). The Big Tough Expensive Job : Imperial Oil and the Canadian Economy. Press Porcépic. ISBN 9780888781222.
- James Laxer and Robert Laxer (1977). The Liberal Idea of Canada: Pierre Trudeau and the Question of Canada's Survival. James Lorimer & Company. ISBN 0888621248.
- James Laxer (1981). Canada's Economic Strategy. McClelland & Stewart. ISBN 9780771049866.
- James Laxer (1983). Oil and Gas: Ottawa, the Provinces and the Petroleum Industry. James Lorimer & Company. ISBN 9780888625410.
- James Laxer (1984). Rethinking the Economy: The Laxer Report on Canadian Economic Problems and Policies. NC Press. ISBN 092005336X.
- James Laxer (1986). Leap of Faith: Free Trade and the Future of Canada. Hurtig. ISBN 9780888302977.
- James Laxer (1987). Decline of the Super Powers: Winners and Losers in Today's Global Economy. Paragon House. ISBN 9781557781420.
- James Laxer (1991). Inventing Europe: The Rise of a New World Power. Lester. ISBN 9781895555004.
- James Laxer (1993). False God: How the Globalization Myth has Impoverished Canada. Lester Pub. ISBN 978-1-895555-09-7.
- James Laxer (1996). In Search of a New Left: Canadian Politics After the Neoconservative Assault. Viking. ISBN 978-0-670-85901-6.
- James Laxer (1998). The Undeclared War: Class Conflict in the Age of Cyber Capitalism. Viking. ISBN 9780670876600.
- James Laxer (2000). Stalking the Elephant: My Discovery of America. Viking. ISBN 9780670886418.
- James Laxer (2003). The Border: Canada, the U.S. and Dispatches from the 49th Parallel. Doubleday Canada. ISBN 9780385659819.
- James Laxer (2005). Red Diaper Baby: A Boyhood in the Age of McCarthyism. Douglas & McIntyre. ISBN 978-1-55365-150-5.
- James Laxer (2006). Empire. Groundwood Books Canada. ISBN 9781554980154.
- James Laxer (2006). The Acadians: In Search of a Homeland. Doubleday Canada. ISBN 9780385672894.
- James Laxer (2008). Mission of Folly: Canada and Afghanistan. Between the Lines Books. ISBN 978-1-897071-37-3.
- James Laxer (2008). The Perils of Empire: America and Its Imperial Predecessors. Viking Canada. ISBN 9780670063611.
- James Laxer (2009). Beyond the Bubble: Imagining a New Canadian Economy. Between the Lines Books. ISBN 978-1-897071-55-7.
- James Laxer (2012). Tecumseh & Brock: The War of 1812. House of Anansi Press. ISBN 978-0-88784-261-0.
- James Laxer (2013). A House Divided: Watching America's Descent into Civil Conflict. House of Anansi Press. ISBN 9781770894242.
- James Laxer (2013). Travels Through the Golden State: A California Diary. House of Anansi Press. ISBN 9781770894235.
- James Laxer (2017). Staking Claims to a Continent: John A. Macdonald, Abraham Lincoln, Jefferson Davis, and the Making of North America. House of Anansi Press. ISBN 9781487002312.

== See also ==
- Canadian Dimension
