= The Waffle =

Wing of Canada's New Democratic Party

The Waffle Movement for an Independent Socialist Canada
- Leader: Mel Watkins and James Laxer
- Founded: 1969
- Dissolved: 1974
- Split from: New Democratic Party of Canada (1972)
- Newspaper: Waffle News
- Ideology: Democratic socialism Quebec sovereigntism Left-wing nationalism

The Waffle (officially known as the Movement for an Independent Socialist Canada after 1972) was a wing of Canada's New Democratic Party (NDP) in the late 1960s and early 1970s. It later transformed into an independent political party, with little electoral success before it permanently disbanded in the mid-1970s. It was generally a New Left youth movement and espoused solidarity with the Quebec sovereignty movement.

== Formation ==
The group formed in 1969. Its leaders were university professors Mel Watkins and James Laxer. It issued a Manifesto for an Independent Socialist Canada and, with support in the NDP caucus and membership, worked to push the party leftward. The Waffle supported the nationalization of Canadian industries to take them out of the hands of American interests. The group was endorsed by the New Democratic Youth. The Waffle manifesto stated, "A socialist society must be one in which there is democratic control of all institutions, which have a major effect on men's lives and where there is equal opportunity for creative non-exploitative self-development. It is now time to go beyond the welfare state." According to the manifesto, "The New Democratic Party must provide leadership in the struggle to extend working men's influence into every area of industrial decision-making.... By bringing men together primarily as buyers and sellers of each other, by enshrining profitability and material gain in place of humanity and spiritual growth, capitalism has always been inherently alienating. Today, sheer size combined with modern technology further exaggerates man's sense of insignificance and impotence. A socialist transformation of society will return to man his sense of humanity, to replace his sense of being a commodity. But a socialist democracy implies man's control of his immediate environment as well, and in any strategy for building socialism, community democracy is as vital as the struggle for electoral success."

=== Name origin ===
The name was meant ironically; one story, quoted in historian Desmond Morton's book The New Democrats, has the name originating during the drafting of the group's manifesto when, at one point, Ed Broadbent said "that if they had to choose between waffling to the left and waffling to the right, they waffle to the left." "The Waffle Manifesto" was the published headline of Jean Howarth's editorial piece in The Globe and Mail on September 6, 1969. Howarth heard about the waffle line from Hugh Winsor, who also worked at The Globe and Mail, and was also a co-signer of the manifesto. When Laxer and other members of the group read the headline, they adopted it.

Another possible origin for the name comes from a film-clip excerpt from a CBC documentary on the NDP, taken during a meeting of the group some months prior to the October 1969 NDP Winnipeg convention. According to the film excerpt, the Waffle term appears to have originated with Jim Laxer when he stated, "in terms of the proposed manifesto, that if it doesn't talk about nationalization of key industries, it becomes a 'waffle document.'" The term "waffle" was picked up by subsequent speakers in the discussion.

== 1971 Ottawa leadership convention ==
The 1971 NDP leadership convention was a battleground between the party establishment and the Waffle. Around 2,000 people of the NDP's 90,000 membership, were members of the Waffle in 1971. The Waffle tried to get as many of their supporters onto the party's governing bodies, but were rebuked by the large bloc of rank-and-file union voters at the convention. Carol Gudmundson — of the Saskatoon, Saskatchewan Waffle — ran unsuccessfully for the party presidency. She was up against former Ontario NDP leader Donald C. MacDonald and lost to him during the April 23rd vote. University of Toronto professor Mel Watkins lost his vice-president position, but managed to get elected to the party's federal council. The campaign for leader of the NDP pitted David Lewis against James Laxer. Through the strong support of the labour unions, Lewis succeeded in defeating Laxer on the fourth round of voting on April 24. Laxer won approximately 37 percent of the final ballot vote, and established that the Waffle had some strength in the party and were no longer a small fringe group.

== Decline in Ontario ==
During the leadership convention, the Waffle was described in the press as a "party within a party." One of the last hurrahs for the Waffle came during the October 1971 Ontario provincial election. The Waffle's Ontario chairman, Steve Penner, was Ontario NDP candidate for MPP from the Dovercourt riding. Despite the public infighting between Penner and Ontario NDP leader Stephen Lewis (son of national NDP leader David Lewis), Penner lost by only 55 votes. The Waffle considered this a success, because in the 1967 election, the NDP candidate lost by over 1,400 votes.

Lewis remained hostile; in 1972, he described the Waffle as "an encumbrance around my neck". Then at the NDP's Provincial Council on 24 June, Lewis obtained a resolution ordering the Waffle to disband or else leave the NDP. Debate on the motion lasted for three hours, with labour leaders leading the charge to expel the Waffle. Finally, the council approved the anti-Waffle motion 217 to 86, thereby ending months of public feuding.

== Independent party ==
Some members of the Waffle remained New Democrats, a noteable one of these being James Dewhirst; however, Laxer and Watkins accepted Lewis's ultimatum and quit the NDP in 1972. They continued the Waffle under the name the Movement for an Independent Socialist Canada, but it was still commonly referred to as the Waffle. The group existed until the Canadian federal election in 1974, when it unsuccessfully ran candidates for Parliament in the federal election. Laxer ran in the York West electoral district in Toronto, placing fourth in a field of seven with 673 votes and only 1.26 percent of the popular vote.

== Legacy ==
The dispute over the Waffle led to the disbanding of the Ontario NDP's youth wing in 1972, which was not revived until 1988. The federal NDP also disbanded the New Brunswick NDP for a period in late 1971 after a local Waffle group gained control of it.

Many of its leaders eventually came back into the party and held important positions within it, which also shaped many of the NDP's policies in the 1980s through to the early 21st century.

== Ideology ==
The Waffle supported democratic socialism and Canadian economic and military independence from the United States. It drafted its Manifesto for an Independent Socialist Canada in 1969.

=== Economic policy ===
The Waffle supported public ownership of key industries to replace U.S. private ownership of parts of the Canadian economy.

=== Foreign policy ===
The group called for Canada to leave NATO.

== See also ==
- New Politics Initiative
- Leap Manifesto
- National Party of Canada (1979)
- Militant tendency, a similar group within the UK Labour Party

== References and notes ==
=== References ===
- Avakumovic, Ivan (1978). Socialism in Canada : a study of the CCF-NDP in federal and provincial politics. Toronto: McClelland and Stewart. ISBN 077100978X.
- Morton, Desmond (1986). The New Democrats: 1961-1986 (3 ed.). Toronto: Copp Clark Pitman Ltd. ISBN 0-7730-4618-6.
- Smith, Cameron (1989). Unfinished Journey: The Lewis Family. Toronto: Summerhill Press. ISBN 0-929091-04-3.
