= Charles Edwin Thompson =

Canadian politician

27th Mayor of Vancouver
- In office 1949–1950
- Preceded by: George Clark Miller
- Succeeded by: Frederick Hume

Personal details
- Born: 11 September 1890 Grey County, Ontario
- Died: 19 April 1966 (aged 75)

Charles Edwin Thompson (11 September 1890 – 19 April 1966) was a Canadian politician. He served one term as the 27th mayor of Vancouver, British Columbia.

Born in Grey County, Ontario, Thompson worked as a teacher, rancher, and an automotive dealer. In 1945 he became a Vancouver alderman and from 1949 to 1950 he served as mayor. He promoted the construction of city infrastructure such as streets and bridges. A prevailing theme during Thompson's term of office was a widespread belief that communism posed a threat to citizens.

Thompson was a devoted Freemason since 1924, initiated with the Latonia Lodge No. 125 in Saskatchewan and affiliated with the Melrose Lodge No. 67 in Vancouver.
