= Vancouver Canucks =

National Hockey League team in Vancouver, British Columbia

- 2026–27 Vancouver Canucks season
- Conference: Western
- Division: Pacific
- Founded: 1945 (PCHL); 1970 (as NHL expansion team)
- History: Vancouver Canucks; 1945–1952 (PCHL); Vancouver Canucks; 1952–1970 (WHL); Vancouver Canucks; 1970–present (NHL)
- Home arena: Rogers Arena
- City: Vancouver, British Columbia
- Team colours: Blue, green, white
- Media: Sportsnet Pacific; Sportsnet One; CKKS-FM
- Owner(s): Canucks Sports & Entertainment (Francesco Aquilini, chairman)
- General manager: Ryan Johnson
- Head coach: Manny Malhotra
- Captain: Vacant
- Minor league affiliates: Abbotsford Canucks (AHL); Kalamazoo Wings (ECHL)
- Stanley Cups: 0
- Conference championships: 3 (1981–82, 1993–94, 2010–11)
- Presidents' Trophies: 2 (2010–11, 2011–12)
- Division championships: 11 (1974–75, 1991–92, 1992–93, 2003–04, 2006–07, 2008–09, 2009–10, 2010–11, 2011–12, 2012–13, 2023–24)
- Official website: nhl.com/canucks

The Vancouver Canucks are a professional ice hockey team based in Vancouver. The Canucks compete in the National Hockey League (NHL) as a member of the Pacific Division in the Western Conference. The team plays its home games at Rogers Arena. Manny Malhotra is the head coach, Ryan Johnson is the general manager, and Daniel and Henrik Sedin serve as the co-presidents of hockey operations.

The Canucks joined the league in 1970 as an expansion team along with the Buffalo Sabres. The team has advanced to the Stanley Cup Final three times, losing to the New York Islanders in 1982, the New York Rangers in 1994 and the Boston Bruins in 2011. They have won the Presidents' Trophy in back-to-back seasons as the team with the league's best regular season record in both the 2010–11 and 2011–12 seasons. The Canucks have won three division titles as a member of the Smythe Division from 1974 to 1993, seven titles as a member of the Northwest Division from 1998 to 2013, and one title as a member of the Pacific Division in 2024. The Canucks, along with the Sabres, are the two oldest teams in the NHL to have never won the Stanley Cup.

The Canucks have retired six players' jerseys in their history—Pavel Bure (10), Stan Smyl (12), Trevor Linden (16), Markus Näslund (19), Daniel Sedin (22) and Henrik Sedin (33); all but Bure and Daniel Sedin have served as team captain, and all but Näslund were on one of the three Stanley Cup Final rosters. Smyl has the distinction of being the only Canuck to have his jersey number retired at their original arena, the Pacific Coliseum.

== History ==
=== Background and establishment ===
The first professional ice hockey team based in Vancouver was the Vancouver Millionaires, formed by Frank and Lester Patrick. Established in 1911, the Millionaires were one of three teams in the new Pacific Coast Hockey Association. To accommodate the Millionaires, the Patrick brothers directed the building of the Denman Arena, which was known at the time as the world's largest artificial ice rink. The arena was later destroyed in a fire in 1936. The Millionaires played for the Stanley Cup five times, winning over the Ottawa Senators in 1915 on home ice. It marked the first time the Stanley Cup was won by a West Coast team in the trophy's history. Absorbed by the Western Canada Hockey League in 1924, the team continued operations until folding at the end of the 1925–26 WHL season.

From 1926 to 1970, Vancouver was home to only minor league teams. Most notably the present-day Canucks' minor league predecessor (also known as the Vancouver Canucks) played from 1945 to 1970 in the Pacific Coast Hockey League and the Western Hockey League.

==== NHL application ====
With the intention of attracting an NHL franchise, Vancouver began the construction of a new modern arena, the Pacific Coliseum, in 1966 (with the arena opening in January 1968). The WHL's Canucks were playing in a small arena at the time, the Vancouver Forum, situated on the same Pacific National Exhibition grounds as the Coliseum. Meanwhile, a Vancouver group led by WHL Canucks owner and former Vancouver mayor Fred Hume made a bid to be one of the six teams due to join the league in 1967, but the NHL rejected their application. Bid leader Cyrus McLean called the denial a "cooked-up deal", referring to several biases that factored against them. Speculation long abounded afterwards that the bid was hindered by Toronto Maple Leafs president Stafford Smythe; after a failed Vancouver-based business deal, he was quoted as saying that the city would not get an NHL franchise in his lifetime. Additionally, the Leafs, along with the Montreal Canadiens, purportedly did not wish to split Canadian Broadcasting Corporation (CBC) hockey revenues three ways rather than two.

Less than a year later, one of the 1967 expansion teams, the Oakland Seals were in financial difficulty and having trouble drawing fans. An apparent deal was in place to move the team to Vancouver, but the NHL did not want to see one of their franchises from the expansion of 1967 move so quickly and vetoed the deal. In exchange for avoiding a lawsuit, the NHL promised Vancouver would get a team in the next expansion round. Another group, headed by Minnesota entrepreneur Tom Scallen, made a new presentation and was awarded an expansion franchise for the price of $6 million (three times the cost in 1967). The new ownership group purchased the WHL Canucks, and brought the team into the league with the Buffalo Sabres as expansion teams for the 1970–71 season.

In preparation for joining the NHL, the WHL Canucks had brought in players with prior NHL experience. Six of these players (John Arbour, George Gardner, Len Lunde, Marc Reaume, Ted Taylor and Murray Hall) would remain with the club for its inaugural NHL season. The rest of the roster was built through an expansion draft.

=== Early years (1970–1982) ===
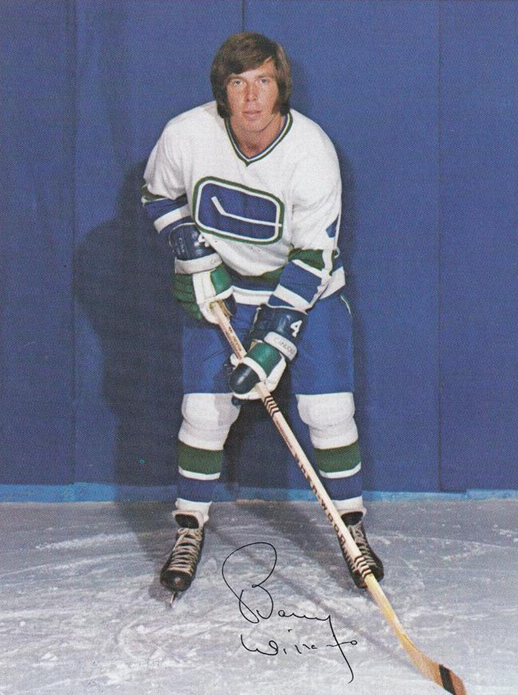
Barry Wilkins (pictured in 1972) scored the first goal in Canucks history.

To fill the Canucks' roster for their inaugural season, the league held an expansion draft in the preceding summer. A draft lottery was held on June 9, 1970, determining who between the Canucks and Sabres would get the first selection in the expansion draft, as well as the 1970 NHL amateur draft; the Sabres won both spins. With his first selection in the expansion draft, Canucks general manager Bud Poile chose defenceman Gary Doak. Among the other players chosen by Vancouver were centre Orland Kurtenbach, who was named the Canucks' first captain, as well as defenceman Pat Quinn, who later became the team's general manager and coach in the 1990s. Two days later, on June 11, 1970, the Canucks made defenceman Dale Tallon their first-ever Amateur Draft selection. Tallon played three seasons with the club before being traded away to the Chicago Black Hawks. By comparison, the Sabres chose centre Gilbert Perreault with the first overall selection they won from the lottery; Perreault went on to become a nine-time All-Star and member of the Hockey Hall of Fame.

With the Canucks' roster set, the team played its inaugural game against the Los Angeles Kings on October 9, 1970. They lost the contest 3–1; defenceman Barry Wilkins scored the Canucks' lone goal in the game and first in franchise history, a backhander against goaltender Denis DeJordy. Two days later, the squad recorded the first win in franchise history, a 5–3 victory over the Toronto Maple Leafs.

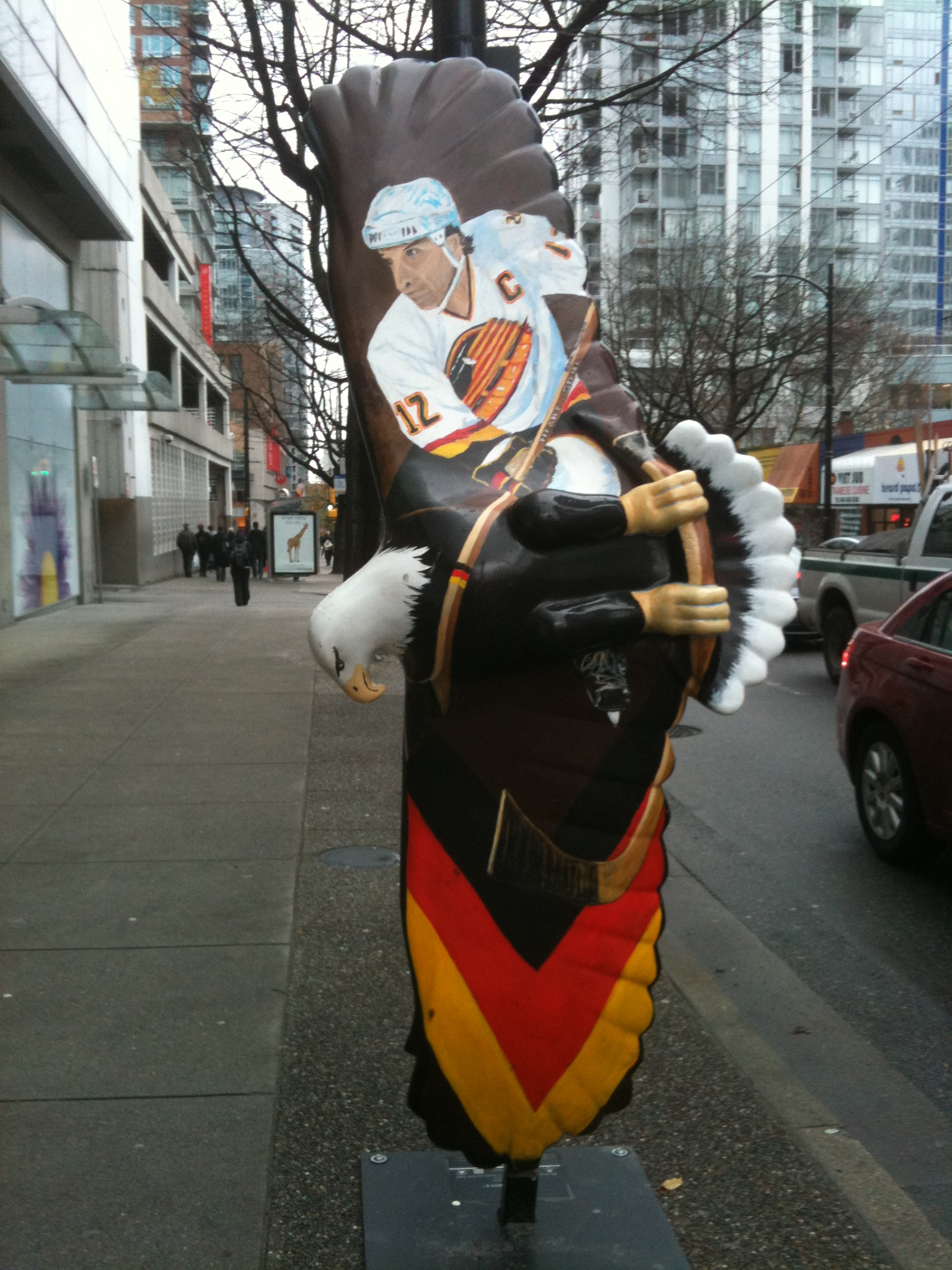
Eagle sculpture featuring Stan Smyl, who was captain for eight seasons

The Canucks struggled in their early years, failing to make the playoffs in their first four seasons. Placed in the competitive East Division, Poile assembled a core of players during this period led by Kurtenbach that included defencemen Tallon and Jocelyn Guevremont, as well as wingers André Boudrias and Dennis Ververgaert. Boudrias emerged as the team's leading point-scorer in four of their first five seasons.

Prior to the 1974–75 season, Scallen and his ownership group from Minnesota sold the team to local media mogul Frank Griffiths for $9 million. Also in the summer of 1974, the Canucks were re-aligned within the league and placed in the new Smythe Division. They responded with their first winning record (38 wins, 32 losses and 10 ties), backstopped by goaltender Gary "Suitcase" Smith finishing first in the Division with 86 points. Making their debut in the Stanley Cup playoffs, the Canucks lost the opening series of the 1975 playoffs in five games to the Montreal Canadiens. Head coach and general manager Phil Maloney (the third general manager in team history after Poile and Hal Laycoe) recalled the importance of a successful season for the Canucks in that year specifically, as the rival league World Hockey Association (WHA) had established another major professional team in the city, the Vancouver Blazers. Competing for the same hockey market, the Canucks emerged over the Blazers as the latter relocated to Calgary, Alberta, the following season. The Canucks posted a second consecutive winning record and made the playoffs in 1975–76, but lost to the New York Islanders in a two-game preliminary series. It would be another 16 years until the team would have another winning record though they made the playoffs nine times in that span.

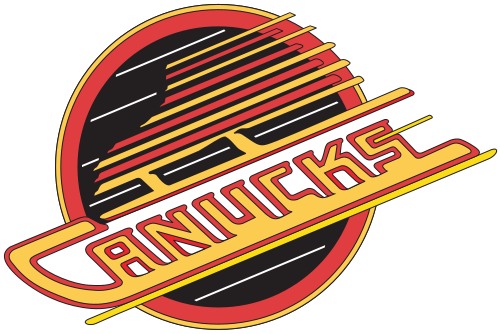
The "Flying Skate" was introduced in 1978. It was created by Beyl & Boyd, a talent agency based in San Francisco.

Kurtenbach retired and assumed a coaching position with Vancouver. His departure as a player marked the beginning of a seven-year period in which the Canucks had four different captains—Boudrias, Chris Oddleifson, Don Lever and Kevin McCarthy. Following the 1976–77 season, Maloney was replaced as general manager by Jake Milford, who acquired such players as Stan Smyl, Thomas Gradin, Darcy Rota, Ivan Boldirev and Richard Brodeur, a core that would lead the team throughout the 1980s.

==== 1982 Stanley Cup run ====
The Canucks made their first significant playoff impact in the 1982 playoffs. In their previous five playoff appearances, the team had failed to win a single series. Though the Canucks finished three games under a .500 win percentage in the 1981–82 regular season, they began gaining momentum by finishing the campaign on a nine-game unbeaten streak. Meanwhile, Smyl emerged as the club's leader, replacing McCarthy as the captain after the latter was sidelined with an injury late in the season (he would retain that position for a team-record eight years). Continuing their success in the playoffs, the Canucks made the Stanley Cup Final with a combined 11–2 record in series against the Calgary Flames, Los Angeles Kings, and Chicago Black Hawks. Despite having a losing regular season record, Vancouver had a home-ice advantage in the first series, having finished second in the Smythe Division to the Edmonton Oilers. The Canucks also had a home-ice advantage during the second-round series against the Kings, who upset the Oilers in the first round.

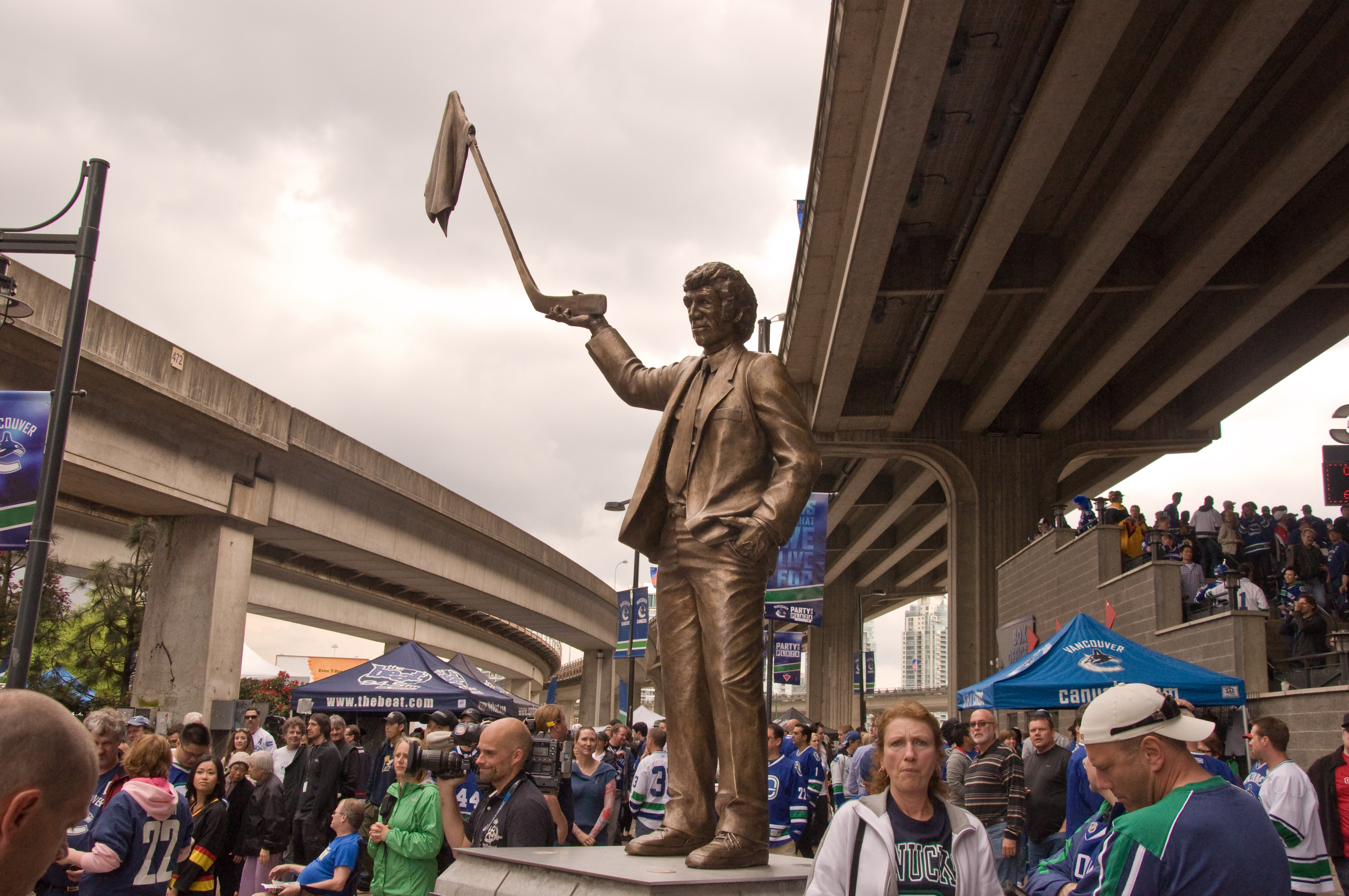
A statue of coach Roger Neilson outside of Rogers Arena, commemorating the 1982 Stanley Cup run

Late in game 2 of the conference finals in Chicago, Vancouver's interim head coach Roger Neilson, frustrated with what he felt was the poor officiating in the game, placed a white towel on the end of a hockey stick and held it up in a gesture mocking surrender (waving the white flag). The players on the Canucks' bench followed suit. When the series shifted to Vancouver for the next two games, the team's fans cheered them on by waving white towels above their heads. The habit stuck, becoming an original Canuck fan tradition now seen across the league and in other sports, known as "Towel Power." The Canucks proceeded to win the series in five games, making it to the Stanley Cup Final for the first time in their history.

Entering the Stanley Cup Final against the New York Islanders, the Canucks were the first team from Western Canada to play for the Stanley Cup in 56 years, when the Victoria Cougars reached the 1926 Stanley Cup Final. It also marked the first-ever coast-to-coast Stanley Cup Final. Competing against the Islanders—the Stanley Cup champions of the previous two years, who had finished with 41 points more than Vancouver in the regular season standings—Vancouver took the first game to overtime. In the final minute of the extra period, Canucks defenceman and fan favourite Harold Snepsts gave the puck away with an errant pass from behind his net, leading to a Mike Bossy goal. Like the first game, the Canucks held a 3–2 lead after the first two periods in the second game, but were not able to keep their lead, and lost 6–4. The Canucks were unable to complete their Cinderella run and were swept, losing their next two games by 3–0 and 3–1 scores. The 1982 playoffs proved to be the last year in which Vancouver won a playoff series until 1992.

=== Decline (1982–1987) ===
After their improbable Stanley Cup run, the Canucks slipped back into mediocrity for the rest of the 1980s, making the playoffs only four times for the rest of the decade. Notable players that joined the Canucks' core following the 1982 playoffs included offensively skilled forwards Patrik Sundström and Tony Tanti. Beginning in 1983–84, the Canucks' scoring title was held by either Sundström or Tanti for four of the next five seasons, the only season in which neither won the team scoring title was in 1985–86, when it was won by Petri Skriko. For most of the second half of the 1980s, the Canucks competed with the Los Angeles Kings for the final playoff spot in the Smythe Division. In the years in which they qualified for the playoffs, the team was eliminated in the first round by either the Edmonton Oilers (in 1986) or the Calgary Flames (in 1983, 1984 and the Flames' championship season in 1989, which was decided in game 7), both division rivals.

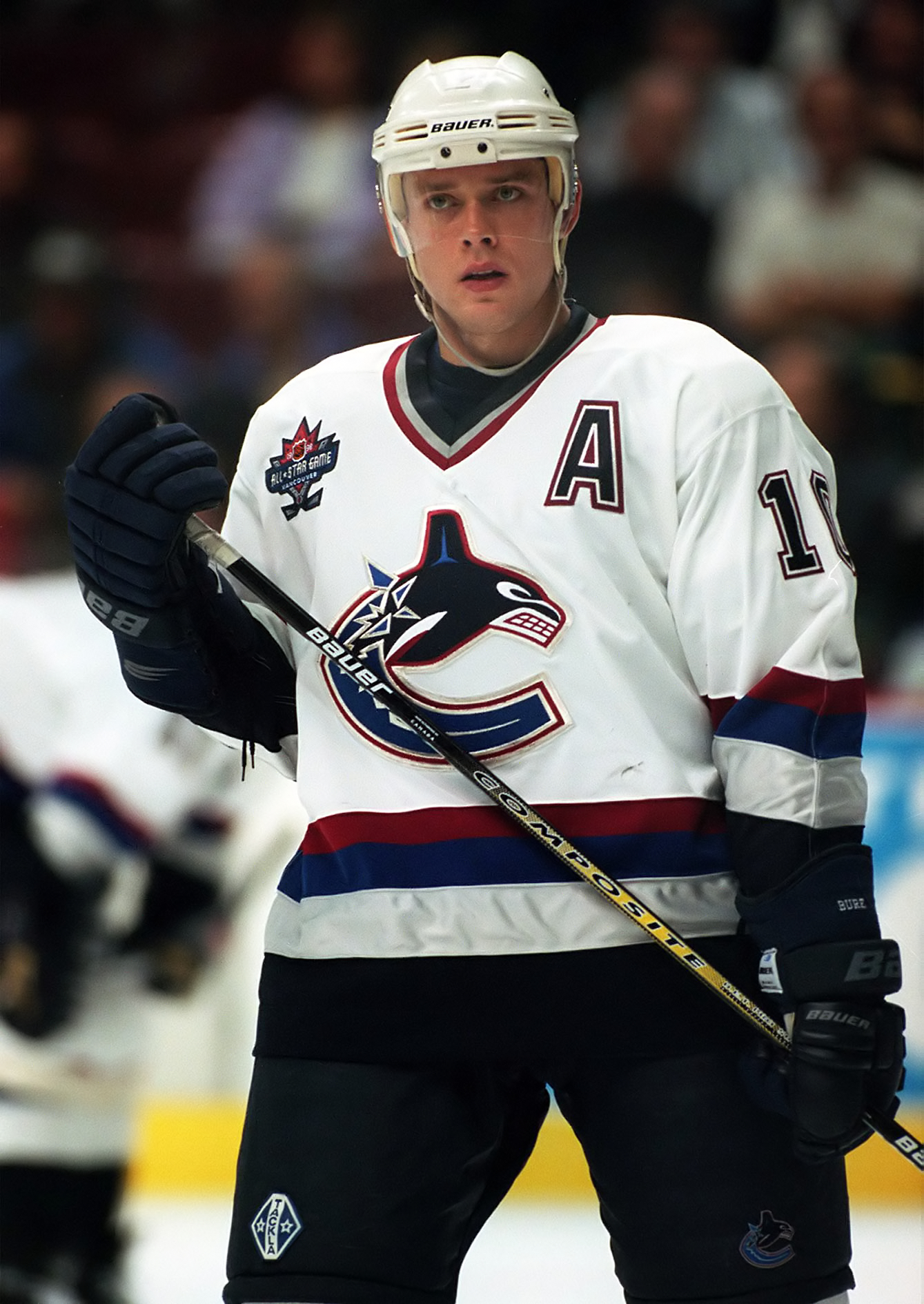
Pavel Bure, became the first Canuck to win the Calder Memorial Trophy in 1992 and is the only sixty-goal scorer in team history. He is regarded as the team's first superstar.

Following Milford's tenure as general manager from 1977 to 1982, the position was held by Harry Neale for three years, then Jack Gordon for two. The latter was responsible for trading away power forward Cam Neely to the Boston Bruins in 1986. In addition to Neely, the Canucks gave up their 1987 first-round draft pick, with which the Bruins chose Glen Wesley, and in return acquired centre Barry Pederson. While Pederson collected back-to-back 70-point seasons with the Canucks in his first two seasons after the trade, he was traded away to the Pittsburgh Penguins in 1989 as his performance quickly declined. Neely went on to have a Hall of Fame career with the Bruins, recording three 50-goal seasons, and Wesley had a solid 20-year career.

=== Pat Quinn era (1987–1998) ===
After the installation of former Canucks defenceman Pat Quinn as general manager in the summer of 1987, the team underwent an immediate rebuilding process, trading away core veterans for younger prospects and players. Among the more key transactions was a deal with the New Jersey Devils, in which Sundström was traded away in exchange for winger Greg Adams and goaltender Kirk McLean. In addition to Quinn's trades, the team improved through the draft route with two selections, in particular. With the second overall selection in the 1988 NHL entry draft, the Canucks chose winger Trevor Linden from the Western Hockey League (WHL). The following year, the team made a controversial selection by choosing Russian winger Pavel Bure 113th overall. Bure was believed by most teams to be ineligible for selection that year. Consequently, his draft by the Canucks took a year to be verified by the league as team management went about procuring documents to prove his eligibility.

As the decade turned, a shift in the Canucks' leadership occurred as Stan Smyl resigned his captaincy prior to the 1990–91 season due to a reduced on-ice role with the team. In his place, the Canucks implemented a rotating captaincy of Linden, Dan Quinn and Doug Lidster; of the three, Linden retained the captaincy thereafter, becoming the youngest permanent captain in team history at 21 years of age. At the end of the season, Smyl retired as the team's all-time leader in games played, goals, assists and points. Led by Linden and in large part to Quinn's dealings, the Canucks rose to prominence in the early 1990s. This increased success came roughly around the time the Oilers and Flames began to sink in the standings. As a result, Vancouver won their first division title in 17 years with 42 wins, 26 losses and 12 ties during the 1991–92 season (it was also the team's first winning season since the 1975–76 season). During the campaign, the Canucks honoured Smyl, who had remained on the team as an assistant coach, by making him the first player in team history to have his jersey (number 12) retired. In the 1992 playoffs, the Canucks won their first series since 1982 before being eliminated by the Oilers in the second round. Quinn and Bure became the first Canucks recipients of major NHL awards in the off-season, being awarded the Jack Adams Award as the best coach (Quinn assumed a dual coaching and general managerial role starting that year) and the top rookie in the league, respectively. The following year, the Canucks repeated as regular season division champions, while Bure emerged as arguably the team's first superstar with his first of back-to-back 60-goal seasons, totals which remain the highest recorded in Canucks history. As the team struggled to score in the second half of the 1993–94 season, Bure recorded 49 goals in the club's final 51 games and contributed to 46.45% of his team's goals in the final 47 games of the season to carry the Canucks into the 1994 postseason. Jim Matheson of the Edmonton Journal called Bure "the NHL's best forward the last 40 games, scoring almost a goal a game."

==== 1994 Stanley Cup run ====
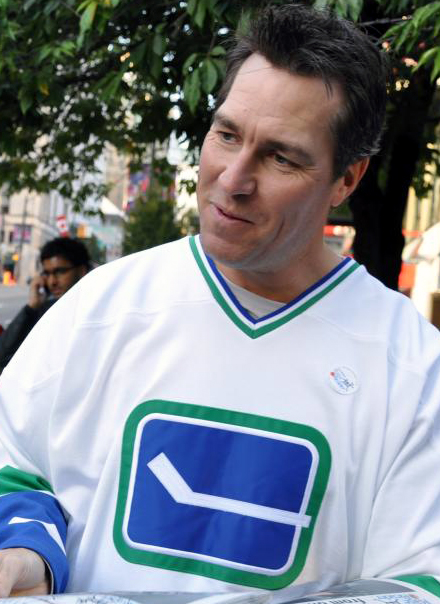
Kirk McLean was a key member of the Canucks' 1994 Stanley Cup run.

In the 1993–94 season, the Canucks made their second trip to the Stanley Cup Final, entering the 1994 playoffs as the seventh seed in the renamed Western Conference. Despite underachieving in the regular season (their points total decreased by 16 from the previous year, although they finished second in the newly renamed Pacific Division), the Canucks played well in the playoffs and embarked on another unexpected run.

Opening the playoffs with a close first-round series against the Calgary Flames, Vancouver rallied from a three-games-to-one deficit to win the series in seven contests. Games 5 through 7 were all won in overtime with goals from Geoff Courtnall, Trevor Linden, and Pavel Bure, respectively. The deciding seventh game featured two of the most recognizable and celebrated plays in Canucks history. With the game tied 3–3 in the first overtime, goaltender Kirk McLean made what became known thereafter as "The Save", sliding across the crease feet-first and stacking his pads on the goal line to stop Robert Reichel on a one-timer pass from Theoren Fleury. The following period, Pavel Bure received a breakaway pass from defenceman Jeff Brown before deking Calgary goaltender Mike Vernon to score and win the series. Fifteen years later, Bure's goal and McLean's save were ranked first and second in a Vancouver Sun article listing the "40 most memorable moments in team history."

Following their victory over the Flames, the Canucks then upset both the Dallas Stars and Toronto Maple Leafs (both in five games) en route to the franchise's second Stanley Cup Final appearance. Forward Greg Adams sent the Canucks into the Stanley Cup Final with a double-overtime goal against Maple Leafs goaltender Felix Potvin in game 5. Staging the second coast-to-coast Final in league history, the Canucks were matched against the Presidents' Trophy-winning New York Rangers. Vancouver achieved victory in game 1 by a score of 3–2 in overtime, largely due to a 52-save performance by goaltender McLean. After losing the next 3 games, the Canucks won the next two to force a seventh game at Madison Square Garden on June 14, 1994. Despite a two-goal effort (one on a shorthanded breakaway) from Linden (who was playing with cracked ribs), Vancouver lost the game by a 3–2 score. The Canucks' efforts to tie the game included a post hit by forward Nathan LaFayette with just over a minute remaining in regulation. The loss was followed by a riot in Downtown Vancouver, which resulted in property damage, injuries and arrests. Two days after the riots, the team held a rally at BC Place attended by 45,000 fans, who congratulated the team for their effort.

With a young core that included Linden, Bure and McLean still in their 20s after the 1994 playoffs, the Canucks appeared poised to remain contenders in the league. However, the team failed to record a winning season in the six years following their Stanley Cup Final appearance. Prior to the lockout-shortened 1994–95 season, Quinn stepped down as head coach to focus on his managerial duties and was replaced by Rick Ley; Vancouver finished with a .500 record that year. Their elimination from the 1995 Stanley Cup playoffs in game 4 of the second round marked the Canucks' last game played at the Pacific Coliseum, as the team moved into the new General Motors Place (since renamed Rogers Arena), a new $160 million arena situated in Downtown Vancouver, the following season.

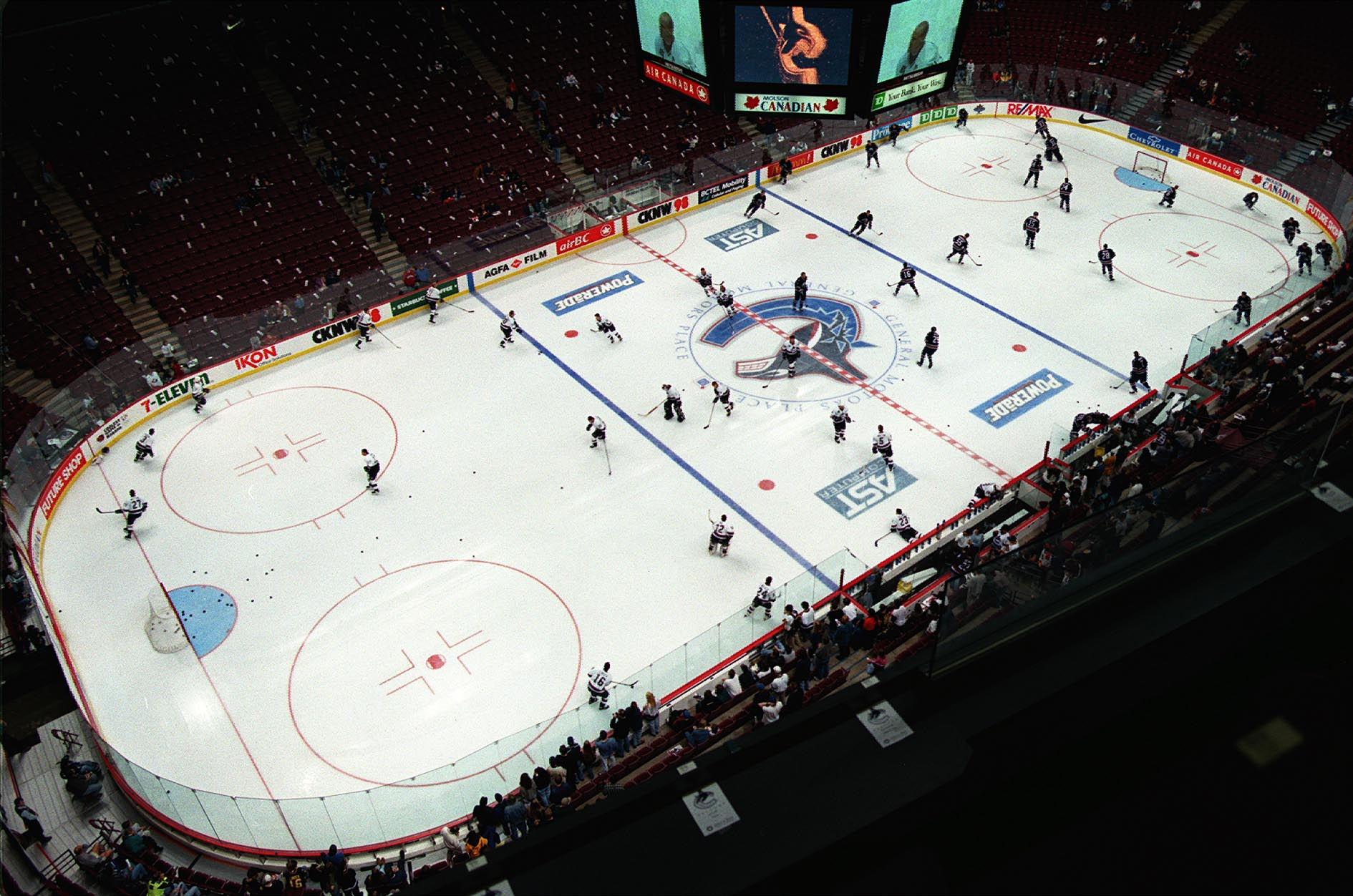
The Vancouver Canucks and the Edmonton Oilers warm up before a match at General Motors Place in October 1997.

The Canucks made another significant move in the off-season by acquiring high-scoring Russian forward Alexander Mogilny from the Buffalo Sabres, reuniting Bure with his former CSKA Moscow and national team linemate. While Mogilny became the second player in team history to record 50 goals and 100 points in a season, chiefly playing with centre Cliff Ronning, the expected chemistry between Mogilny and Bure never materialized, with the latter suffering a season-ending knee injury early in the campaign. Vancouver finished 1995–96 two games below .500 and were defeated in the first round of the playoffs by the Colorado Avalanche. The season also marked the arrival of another future Canucks superstar, as Markus Näslund was acquired from the Pittsburgh Penguins in exchange for Alek Stojanov. The deal is regarded as one of the most lopsided trades in NHL history, as Stojanov soon became a minor-leaguer, while Näslund became the team's all-time leading goal- and point-scorer years later. Despite a late season swoon, Ley was fired and replaced by Quinn down the stretch. The team limped into the playoffs, losing to the Colorado Avalanche in the first round.

In the 1996 off-season, Quinn hired Tom Renney whose tenure as the team's head coach lasted less than two seasons. Despite strong performances from Mogilny and team-leading point-scorer Martin Gelinas in Bure and Linden's absence (both of whom were injured for long periods of time during the season), the Canucks missed the playoffs for the first of four consecutive seasons that year. Making another high-profile acquisition on July 27, 1997, the Canucks signed free agent Mark Messier to a three-year deal. They had come close to signing Wayne Gretzky the previous summer, but were reportedly spurned away when they refused to continue negotiations and gave Gretzky an ultimatum to sign.

==== Keenan and Messier (1997–1998) ====
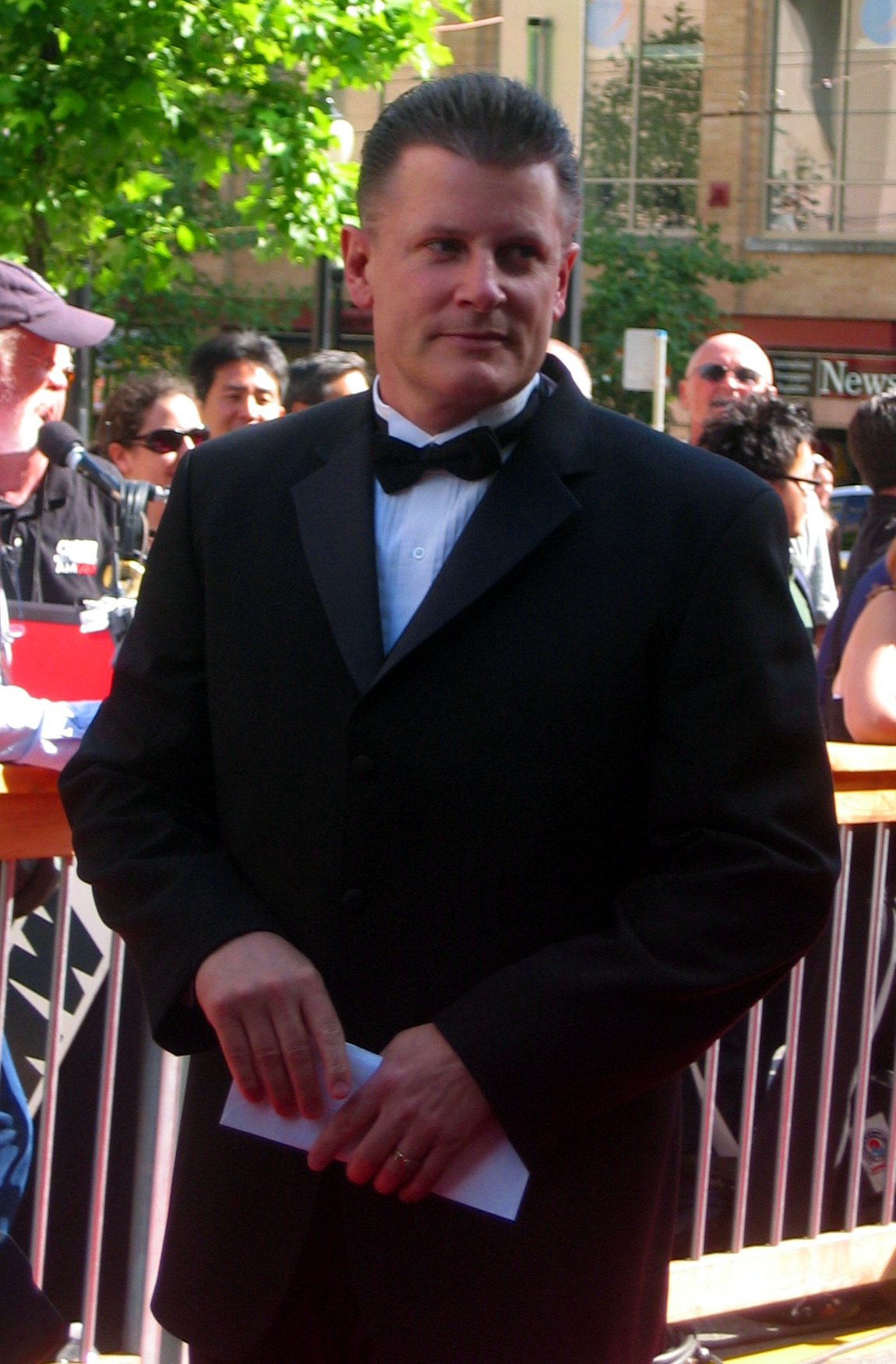
Marc Crawford became the Canucks' head coach in 1998–99. Crawford also played for the team in the 1980s.

Heading into the 1997–98 season, Linden resigned his captaincy for Messier, who had developed a strong reputation as a leader, having captained the New York Rangers over the Canucks in 1994 (he also captained the Oilers to a Stanley Cup in 1990). Linden later recalled regretting the decision, feeling that Messier generated hostility and tension in the dressing room.

The Canucks began the campaign overseas in a two-game series against the Mighty Ducks of Anaheim in Tokyo, Japan. It marked the first time in NHL history that a regular season game was held outside of North America—an effort from the league to attract attention to the sport in anticipation of the 1998 Winter Olympics, which were held in Nagano, Japan. As the team's performance continued to worsen, starting the 1997–98 season with three wins in the first 16 games, Quinn was fired as general manager after ten years with the team. Soon thereafter, Renney was fired and replaced as coach by Mike Keenan, reuniting him with Messier, another central figure from the Rangers' 1994 team. Keenan's hiring reportedly exacerbated tensions between groups of Canucks players and his negative relationship with Linden was given ample media attention. Two months into his tenure with the team, his role was expanded and he was made de facto general manager. With control of player personnel, Keenan overhauled the roster, making ten trades within two months, most notably dealing Linden to the New York Islanders. Although the trade was unpopular with fans, the Canucks received winger Todd Bertuzzi in return, who would later become an integral part of the team's return to success in the next decade. Defenceman Bryan McCabe was also part of the deal, who would eventually be involved in a key transaction in the 1999 NHL entry draft.

=== Brian Burke era (1998–2004) ===
==== West Coast Express years and the early years of the Sedins (1998–2006) ====
After the Canucks finished the 1997–98 season last in the Western Conference, former NHL vice president Brian Burke was named general manager in the summer. Suffering their worst season since 1977–78 the subsequent year, Keenan was fired midway through and replaced with Marc Crawford (who had won the Stanley Cup with the Colorado Avalanche in 1996). Meanwhile, Pavel Bure, unhappy in Vancouver, had withheld himself from the team and requested a trade at the beginning of the campaign. By January 1999, he was dealt to the Florida Panthers in a seven-player trade, which saw eventual five-time NHL All-Star Ed Jovanovski heading west. The trade also involved two draft picks. Finishing last in the Western Conference for a second straight year, Vancouver possessed the third overall pick in the 1999 NHL entry draft. Set on drafting highly touted Swedish forwards Daniel and Henrik Sedin, Burke orchestrated several transactions to move up to the second and third overall picks, with which he chose both players.

The Canucks began to show improvement in the 1999–2000 season, finishing four points out of a playoff spot. During the campaign, Mogilny was traded to the New Jersey Devils for forwards Denis Pederson and Brendan Morrison. With Bure gone and Messier in the last year of his contract, several previously under-achieving players began developing into key contributors for the team, most notably Markus Näslund and Todd Bertuzzi. In the off-season, Messier left the team and returned to the Rangers; during the team's September 2000 training camp, held in Sweden, Näslund was selected to replace Messier as captain, a position he held for seven seasons. As part of the team's stay in Sweden, they played exhibition games against Swedish and Finnish teams as part of the NHL Challenge.

Under the leadership of general manager Brian Burke and head coach Marc Crawford, the Canucks once again became a playoff team. After qualifying for the postseason in 2001 and 2002 as the eighth and final seed in the Western Conference (losing to the eventual Stanley Cup winners Colorado Avalanche and Detroit Red Wings, respectively), the Canucks became regular contenders for the Northwest Division title.

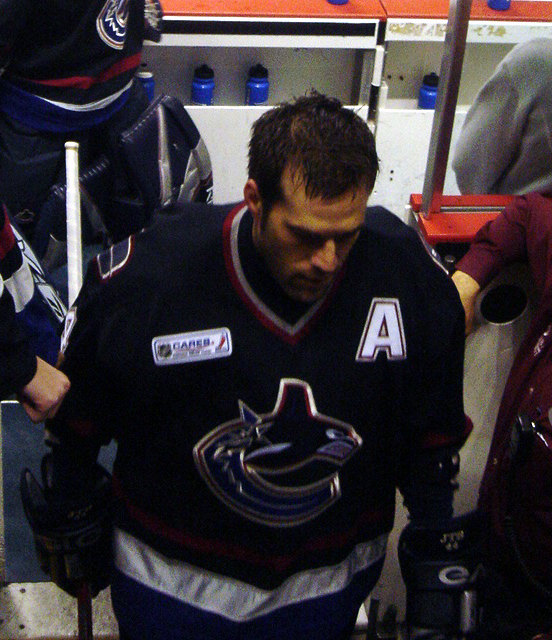
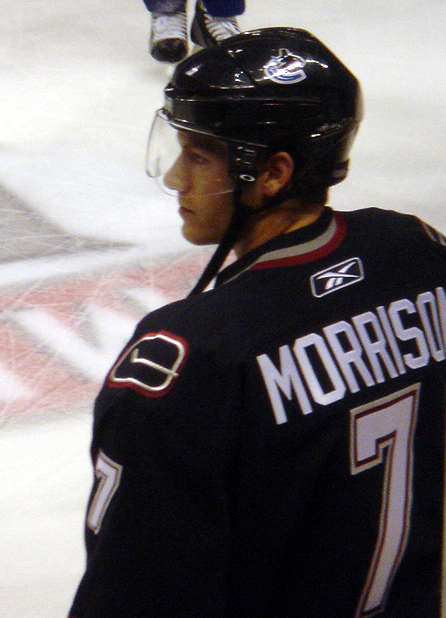
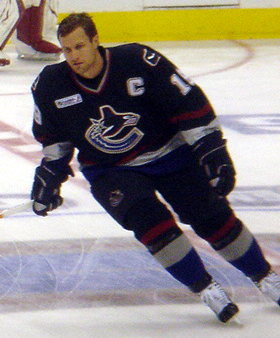
Todd Bertuzzi, Brendan Morrison, and Markus Näslund during the Canucks 2005–06 season opener. The three players formed the West Coast Express, a hockey line that played from 2002 to 2006.

Coinciding with the team's success in the early 2000s was the rise of power forward Todd Bertuzzi and captain Markus Näslund into high-scoring wingers and NHL All-Stars. Joined by centre Brendan Morrison during the 2001–02 season, the trio were nicknamed the "West Coast Express" (after the Vancouver rail service of the same name) among Canucks fans and media. Over the next three years, Näslund ranked in the top five among league scorers and was a Lester B. Pearson Award winner and Hart Memorial Trophy finalist in 2003. Bertuzzi was also a top-five scorer in the league in 2001–02 and 2002–03. During this span, Burke made a trade with the Washington Capitals to facilitate the return of Trevor Linden. The ex-captain returned to a markedly different Canucks team with a young core consisting of the aforementioned trio, defencemen Ed Jovanovski and Mattias Öhlund, as well as goaltender Dan Cloutier.

In 2002–03, the Canucks set a franchise record with a 10-game win streak but lost the division title to the Colorado Avalanche on the last day of the regular season. Individually, Näslund was surpassed the same night by Avalanche forwards Peter Forsberg and Milan Hejduk for the Art Ross Trophy and Maurice "Rocket" Richard Trophy, respectively. Entering the 2003 playoffs with the fourth seed in the Western Conference, the Canucks won their first playoff series in eight years, defeating the St. Louis Blues in seven games before losing to the Minnesota Wild in the second round. In both series, they were 3–1 comebacks; the Canucks rallied to beat the Blues, but lost their own 3–1 lead to the Wild, who had also come back from a 3–1 deficit in the first round, against the Avalanche.

Amidst a run for the team's first Northwest Division title the following season, the Canucks received significant media attention for their involvement in a violent on-ice attack during a game against the Avalanche. On March 8, 2004, Bertuzzi grabbed Avalanche forward Steve Moore from behind and punched him in the head. As Moore fell to the ice, Bertuzzi landed on top of him; Moore suffered three fractured neck vertebrae, facial cuts and a concussion. The incident was in retaliation of a hit that Moore landed on Näslund during a previous game between the two teams. For his actions, Bertuzzi was suspended by the NHL and International Ice Hockey Federation (IIHF) through to the start of the 2005–06 season. He also faced legal action in British Columbia court, while Moore filed lawsuits against him and the Canucks organization in Colorado and Ontario courts.

The Canucks went on to win their first Northwest Division title that season, but lost in the first round of the 2004 playoffs to the Calgary Flames. After their elimination, Burke's contract as general manager was not renewed and he was replaced by assistant general manager and director of hockey operations Dave Nonis. At 37 years old, he became the youngest general manager in team history. Due to the NHL lockout, the 2004–05 season was not played. Several Canucks players went overseas to Europe to play professionally, including Näslund and the Sedin twins, who all returned to their former Swedish team, Modo Hockey.

=== Dave Nonis era (2004–2008) ===
Upon the resolution of the labour dispute between NHL players and owners, new gameplay rules were set in place for the 2005–06 season that were intended to benefit skilled players and generate more goal-scoring. As the Canucks' basis of success in previous seasons was built on playing a fast-paced, high-scoring style of play, expectations for the team were high going into the season. (Note: For example: decreased tolerance for impeding a player as he is skating, four-foot increase length-wise in the offensive zones, abolishment of the two-line pass rule (i.e. passing the puck from the defending zone to the opposing side of centre) and a decrease in goaltending equipment size.) However, the team failed to qualify for the playoffs, completing the regular season ninth place in the conference. The first line of Näslund, Bertuzzi and Morrison suffered offensively, as all three players recorded decreased points totals. Head coach Marc Crawford later recalled the campaign as a turning point for the team's offensive leadership as the Sedin twins began their rise to stardom, matching the top line's production. Crawford was fired in the off-season and replaced with Alain Vigneault, who had been coach of the team's American Hockey League (AHL) affiliate, the Manitoba Moose. Three days after Vigneault's hiring, Nonis dealt Bertuzzi to the Florida Panthers, ending the "West Coast Express" era. In return, the Canucks received All-Star goaltender Roberto Luongo as part of a six-player trade. With the acquisition of Luongo, Cloutier was traded away to the Los Angeles Kings.

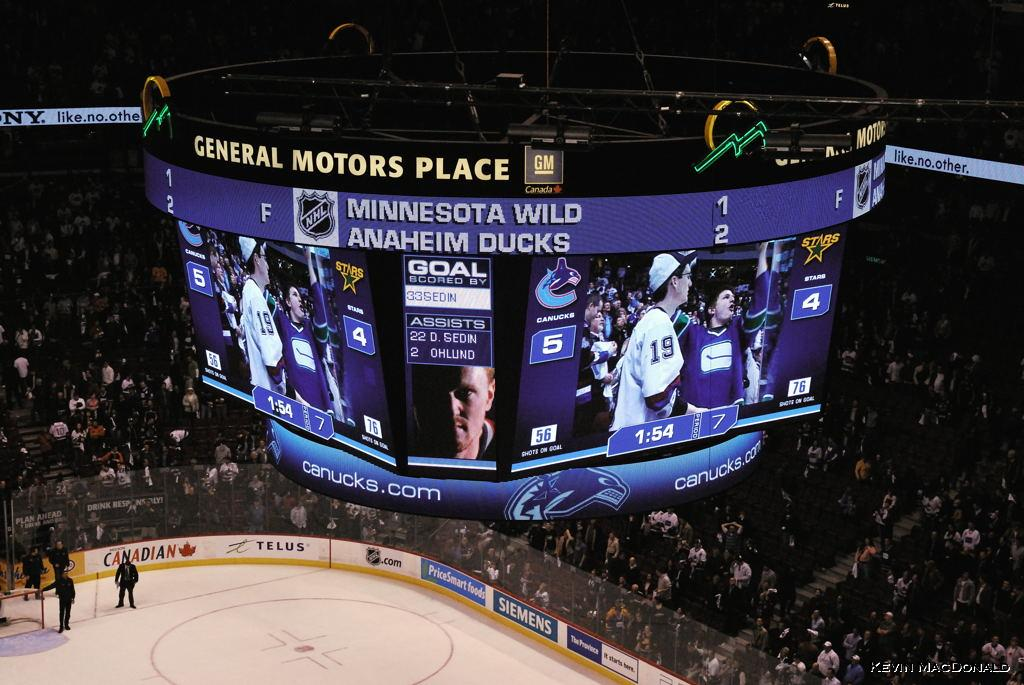
Scoreboard after game one of the 2007 conference quarterfinals between the Canucks and the Dallas Stars. Ending at the 138-minute mark, it was the longest game in the club's history.

With widespread changes to team personnel in 2006–07, the Canucks won the Northwest Division title for the second time in three seasons. In his first season with the Canucks, Luongo was nominated for the Hart Memorial and Vezina Trophies. He also tied Bernie Parent for the second-most wins in a single-season by an NHL goaltender, with 47. The Canucks opened the 2007 playoffs with a quadruple-overtime win against the Dallas Stars. Ending at the 138-minute mark, the game was the longest in club history and the sixth-longest in NHL history. The Canucks also set a league record for shots against in one game, allowing 76. Vancouver won the series in seven games despite a lack of goal-scoring; Stars goaltender Marty Turco recorded three shutouts in the series and equalled the league record for most shutouts in a playoff series. Advancing to the second round, the team was defeated in five games by the Anaheim Ducks, who went on to win the Stanley Cup that year. Following the playoffs, head coach Vigneault received the Jack Adams Award.

Suffering numerous injuries to players in the 2007–08 season, the Canucks struggled and finished three points out of a playoff spot. The final game of the season, a 7–1 loss to the Calgary Flames, marked Trevor Linden's last NHL game, as the former Canucks' all-time leading scorer retired. Having missed the playoffs for the second time in three years, the team underwent numerous personnel changes in the off-season.

=== Mike Gillis era (2008–2014) ===
==== Return to the playoffs (2008–2010) ====
After Nonis was fired and replaced with former player agent Mike Gillis in April 2008, longtime Canucks captain Markus Näslund, as well as Brendan Morrison, were let go via free agency. Also in the off-season, on May 29, 2008, the Canucks lost defensive prospect Luc Bourdon to a fatal motorcycle crash near his hometown of Shippagan, New Brunswick.

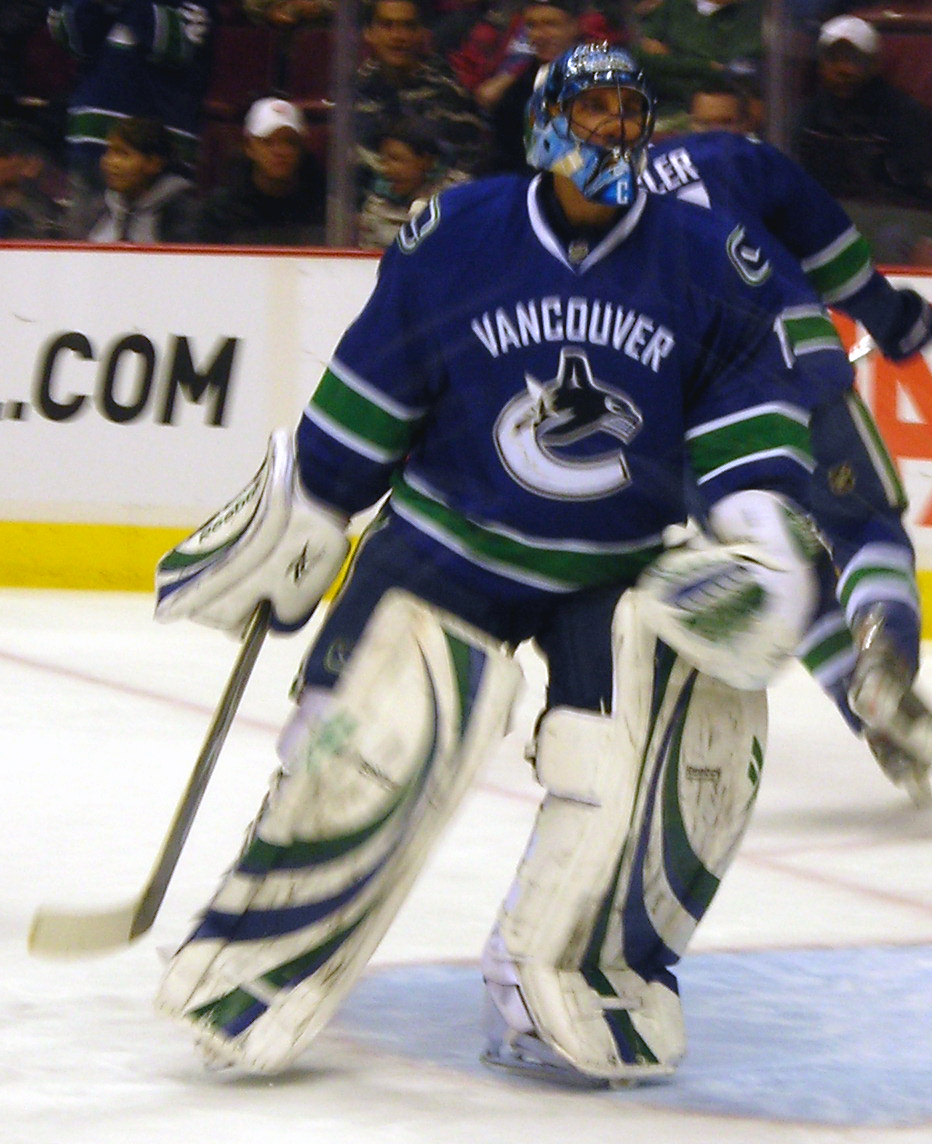
Roberto Luongo during the 2008–09 season, with a C visible on his goaltender mask denoting his captaincy. He was named captain of the Canucks in September 2008.

With Näslund's departure, Gillis announced on September 30, 2008, that Roberto Luongo had been named team captain, marking the first time since Bill Durnan of the Montreal Canadiens in 1947–48 that a goaltender had been named the captain of an NHL team. During the ensuing season, the Canucks retired their second jersey number in team history, hanging Linden's number 16 beside Smyl's number 12 in a pre-game ceremony on December 17, 2008. Later that month, the Canucks acquired unrestricted free agent Mats Sundin. The arrival of the former Toronto Maple Leafs captain and 500-goal scorer in the NHL came with high expectations. However, Sundin scored below his usual pace and retired in the subsequent off-season. The team finished the regular season with another Northwest Division title and the third seed in the Western Conference. In the 2009 playoffs, the Canucks swept their first round series against the sixth-seeded St. Louis Blues (the first four-game sweep in franchise history), but were defeated in six games by the fourth-seeded Chicago Blackhawks in the second round.

In the 2009–10 season, the Canucks faced the longest road trip in NHL history, playing 14 games over six weeks, from January 27 to March 13, 2010. The schedule was a result of Vancouver hosting the 2010 Winter Olympics, which shut down the NHL for two weeks, facilitating General Motors Place's use for ice hockey during the games. It marked the first time that an NHL market hosted an Olympics since the league allowed its players to compete in the games, beginning with the 1998 Games in Nagano. Among the several Canucks players named to their respective national teams, centre Ryan Kesler of the United States and goaltender Roberto Luongo of Canada played against each other in the gold medal game; Luongo and Team Canada emerged with the win.

As the NHL season resumed, Henrik Sedin went on to become the first Canucks player to win the Art Ross and Hart Memorial Trophies as the league's leading scorer and most valuable player, respectively. He achieved the feat with a franchise-record 112 points, surpassing Pavel Bure's mark of 110 set in 1991–92. Vancouver won the Northwest Division title and finished third in the Western Conference for the second-straight year. They opened the playoffs by defeating the sixth-place Los Angeles Kings in six games, but were once again eliminated by Chicago in six games, who went on to win the Stanley Cup that year, the following round in six games.

==== Third Stanley Cup Final run and back-to-back Presidents' Trophies (2010–2012) ====
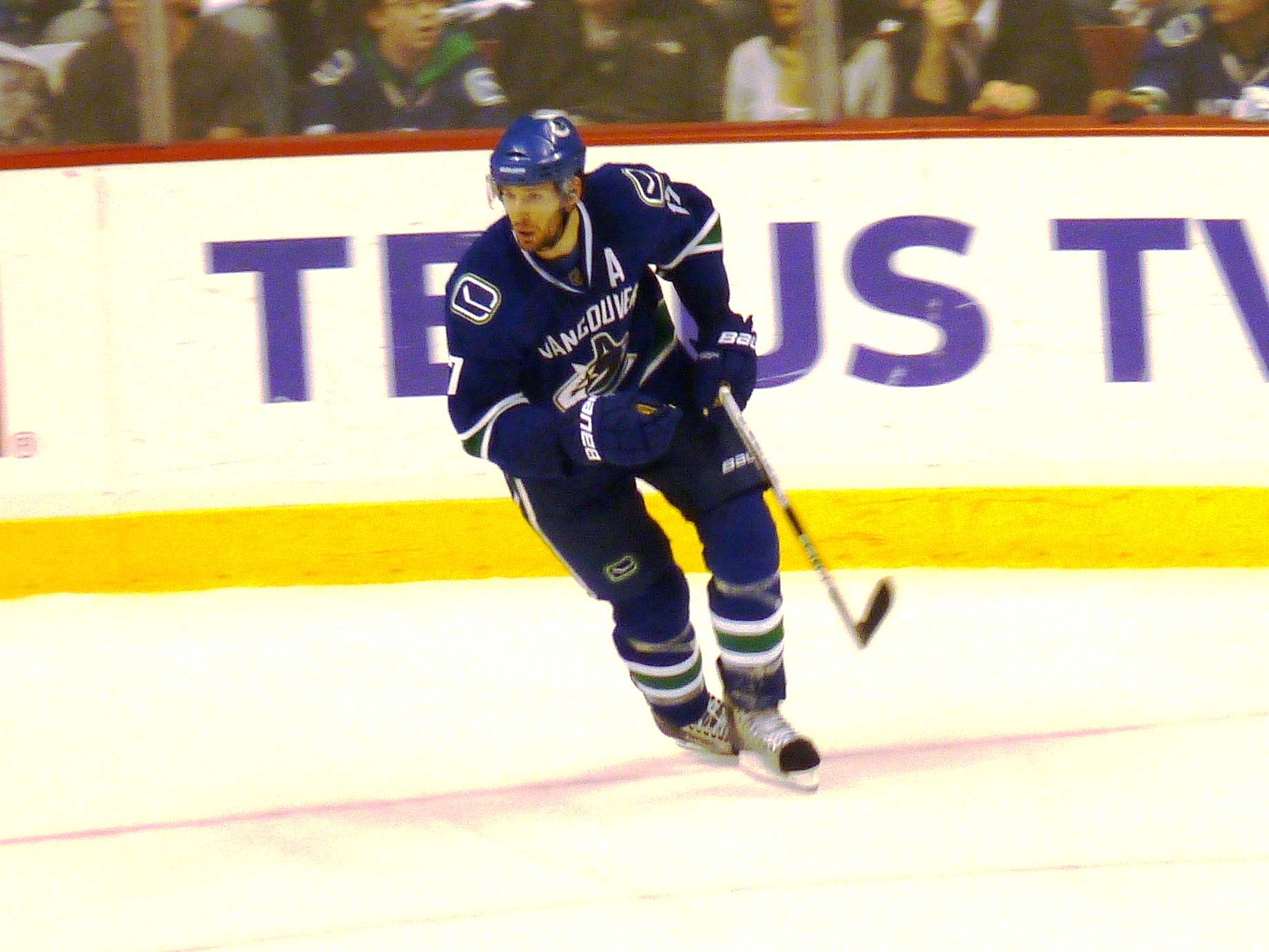
Ryan Kesler with the Canucks during the 2010 conference quarterfinals. Kesler spent the first 10 seasons of his NHL career with the team.

The 2010–11 season began on October 9, 2010, with a pre-game ceremony to commemorate the team's 40-year anniversary. Henrik Sedin was named in the ceremony as the team's new captain, replacing Roberto Luongo, who had relinquished his captaincy in the off-season. The Canucks played the Los Angeles Kings, their first opponent in their inaugural season in 1970; both teams wore their original uniforms used in the Canucks' inaugural game. Throughout the season, the Canucks continued to celebrate their 40th anniversary with the creation of the "Ring of Honour", a permanent in-arena display commemorating their most significant players from past years. Four players were inducted during the campaign—Orland Kurtenbach, Kirk McLean, Thomas Gradin and Harold Snepsts. In December 2010, the Canucks also honoured Markus Näslund by retiring his number 19 jersey. Näslund had retired two years after leaving the Canucks in 2008. The team finished the season first overall in the league for the first time, winning the Presidents' Trophy. Finishing with 54 wins and 117 points, the Canucks broke the previous team records in both categories by significant margins. Individually, numerous players had career years. Daniel Sedin won the Art Ross Trophy as the league's top scorer with 104 points, marking the first time in NHL history that two brothers won the award in back-to-back years. Meanwhile, Ryan Kesler tied Daniel Sedin for the team goal-scoring lead, with 41 goals. In goal, Roberto Luongo and backup Cory Schneider captured the William M. Jennings Trophy for allowing the fewest goals against.

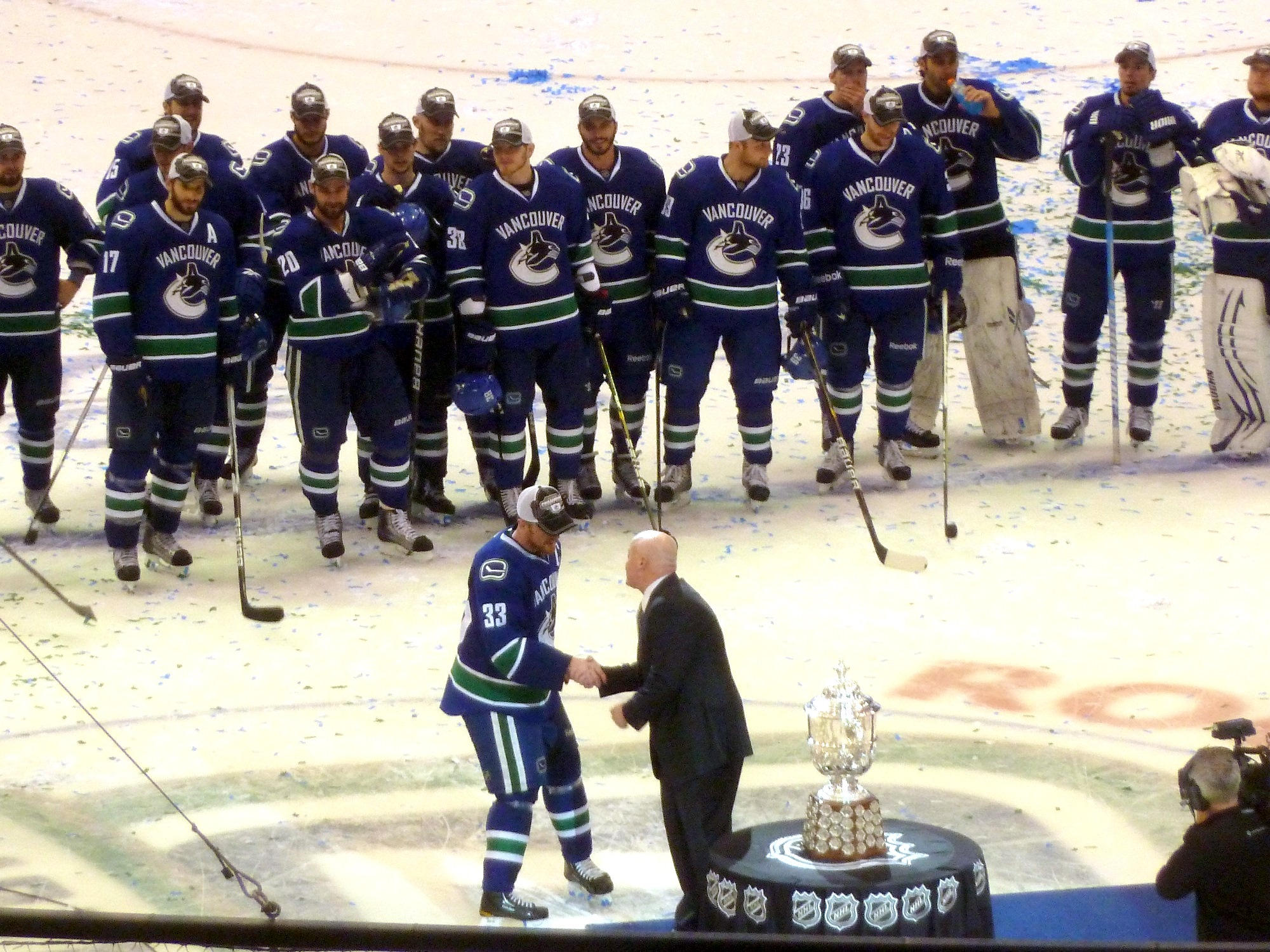
Henrik Sedin accepts the Clarence S. Campbell Bowl on behalf of the Canucks as the 2011 Western Conference champions.

Entering the opening round of the 2011 Stanley Cup playoffs, the Canucks played the defending Stanley Cup champions and eighth-seeded Chicago Blackhawks, who had eliminated Vancouver in the previous two years in six games in the second round. While Vancouver initially took a 3–0 lead in the series, Chicago came back to win three straight games 7–2, 5–0 and 4–3, respectively to force a seventh game in the series. Forced into overtime in game seven, winger Alexandre Burrows scored his second goal of the game in overtime on Blackhawks goaltender Corey Crawford following a failed clearing attempt by Chicago defenceman Chris Campoli to win the game 2–1 and the series 4–3. The Canucks played the fifth-seeded Nashville Predators in the second round, defeating the Predators in six games to clinch a spot in the conference finals for the first time since 1994. Facing the second-seeded San Jose Sharks in the conference finals, Vancouver won in five games against the second-seeded Sharks with Kevin Bieksa scoring the winning goal in overtime against Sharks' goaltender Antti Niemi. Advancing to the Stanley Cup Final for the first time since 1994, the Canucks won the first two games of the series on home ice against the third-seeded Boston Bruins 1–0 and 3–2, respectively, with Boston winning the next two in Boston 8–1 and 4–0, respectively. Vancouver won game 5 at home 1–0, giving them a 3–2 series lead and a chance to capture the Stanley Cup in game 6 in Boston. The Bruins, however, won game 6 in Boston 5–2 to force a game 7 and then the deciding game 7 in Vancouver 4–0 to win the Stanley Cup for the first time since 1972. After the game, riots and looting broke out in downtown Vancouver, repeating the events of 17 years earlier.

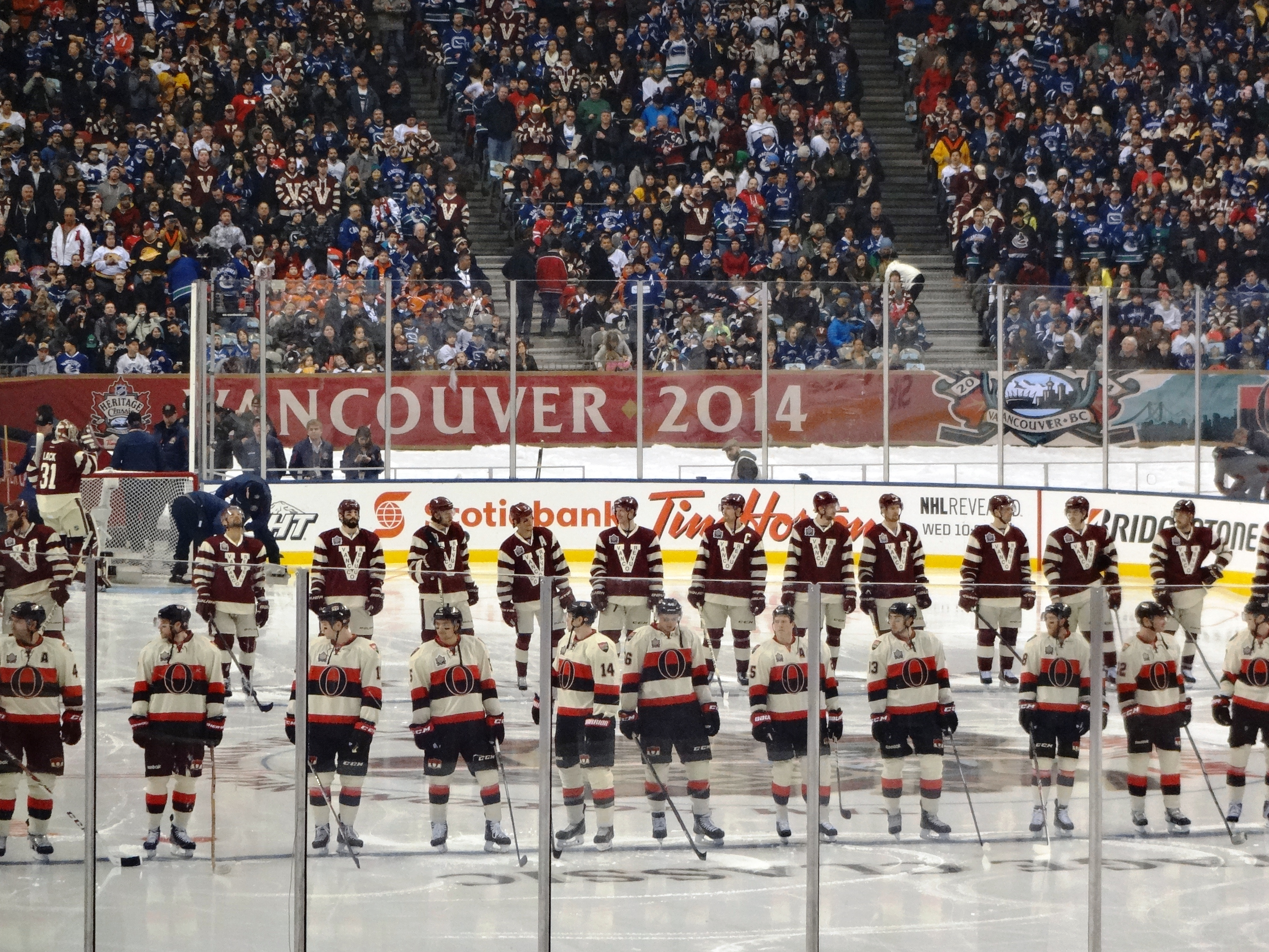
The Canucks and Ottawa Senators played in the 2014 Heritage Classic at BC Place in Vancouver.

During the season-opening game on October 6, 2011 against the Pittsburgh Penguins, a ceremony was held to honour Rick Rypien, who died by suicide during the 2011 off-season. For the rest of the season, the players wore decals on their helmets saying "37 RYP." The Canucks were strong contenders for much of the 2011–12 season, and clinched Presidents' Trophy, for the second consecutive year and second time in franchise history altogether. Despite projections for another Stanley Cup run at the outset of the 2012 playoffs, the Canucks were eliminated in five games by the eighth-seeded and eventual Cup champion Los Angeles Kings.

==== End of the Gillis era (2012–2014) ====
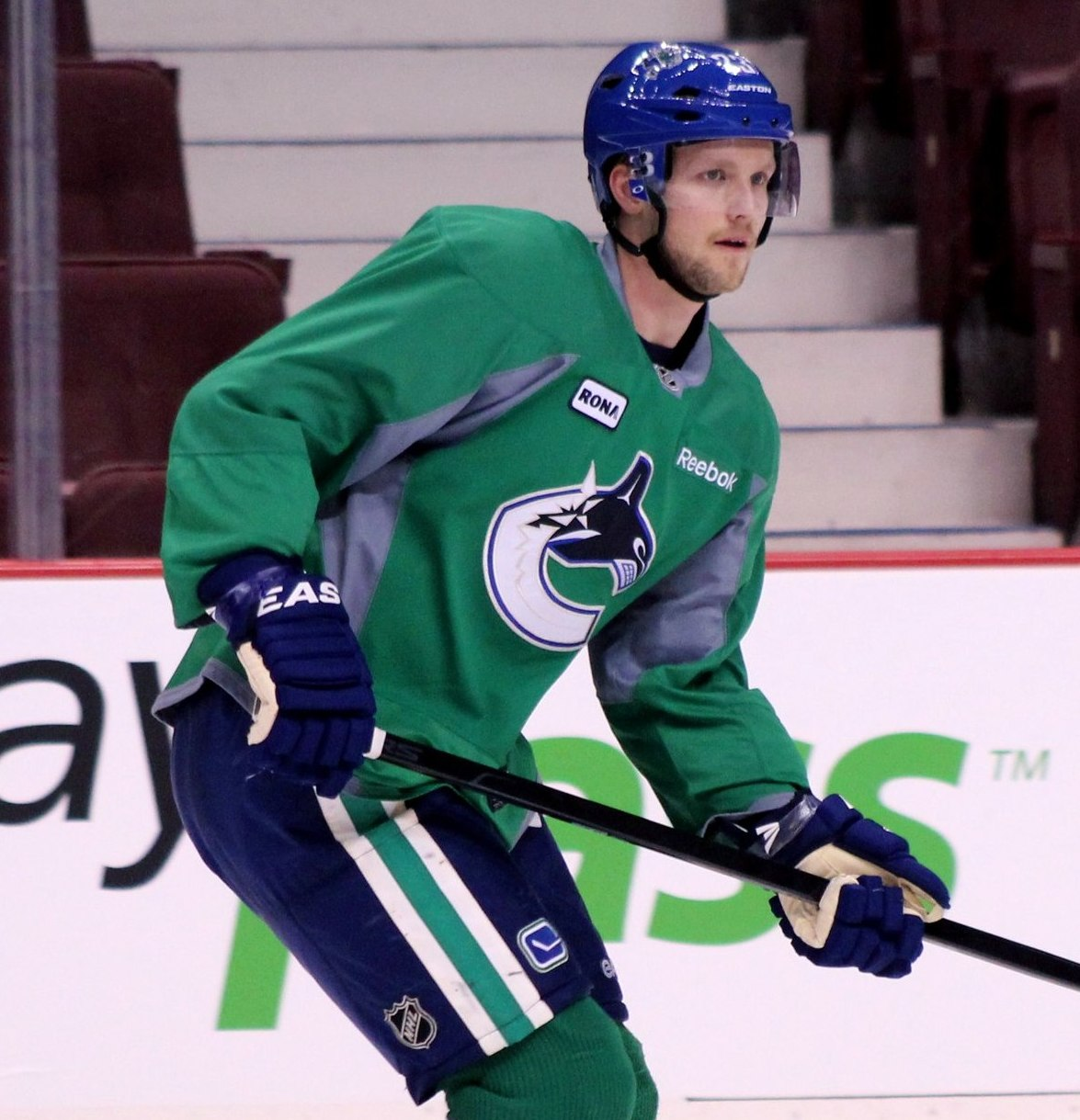
Vancouver Canucks defenceman Alex Edler during a practice on March 9, 2012.

The league's collective bargaining agreement (CBA) expired. Unable to agree on a new CBA, the NHL enacted a lockout on September 15, 2012. The lockout continued on for 119 days, which resulted a 48-game shortened season. The Canucks wore Vancouver Millionaires replica jerseys on March 16, 2013, to celebrate the 100-year anniversary of the Millionaires.

Vancouver finished the year winning their fifth consecutive Northwest Division title and the third seed in the West, but were swept in the first round of the 2013 playoffs by the sixth-seeded San Jose Sharks. Vigneault and his coaching staff were fired at the end of the season, and replaced by John Tortorella.

The Canucks participated in their first outdoor NHL game on March 2, 2014, a match against the Ottawa Senators at BC Place. The event was titled the 2014 Heritage Classic. Luongo was traded back to the Florida Panthers late in the season, while the team failed to make the playoffs for the first time in six years. This saw Gillis fired and Linden named president of hockey operations; Tortorella was also relieved as coach after his one season.

=== Jim Benning era (2014–2021) ===
==== Later years of the Sedins (2014–2018) ====
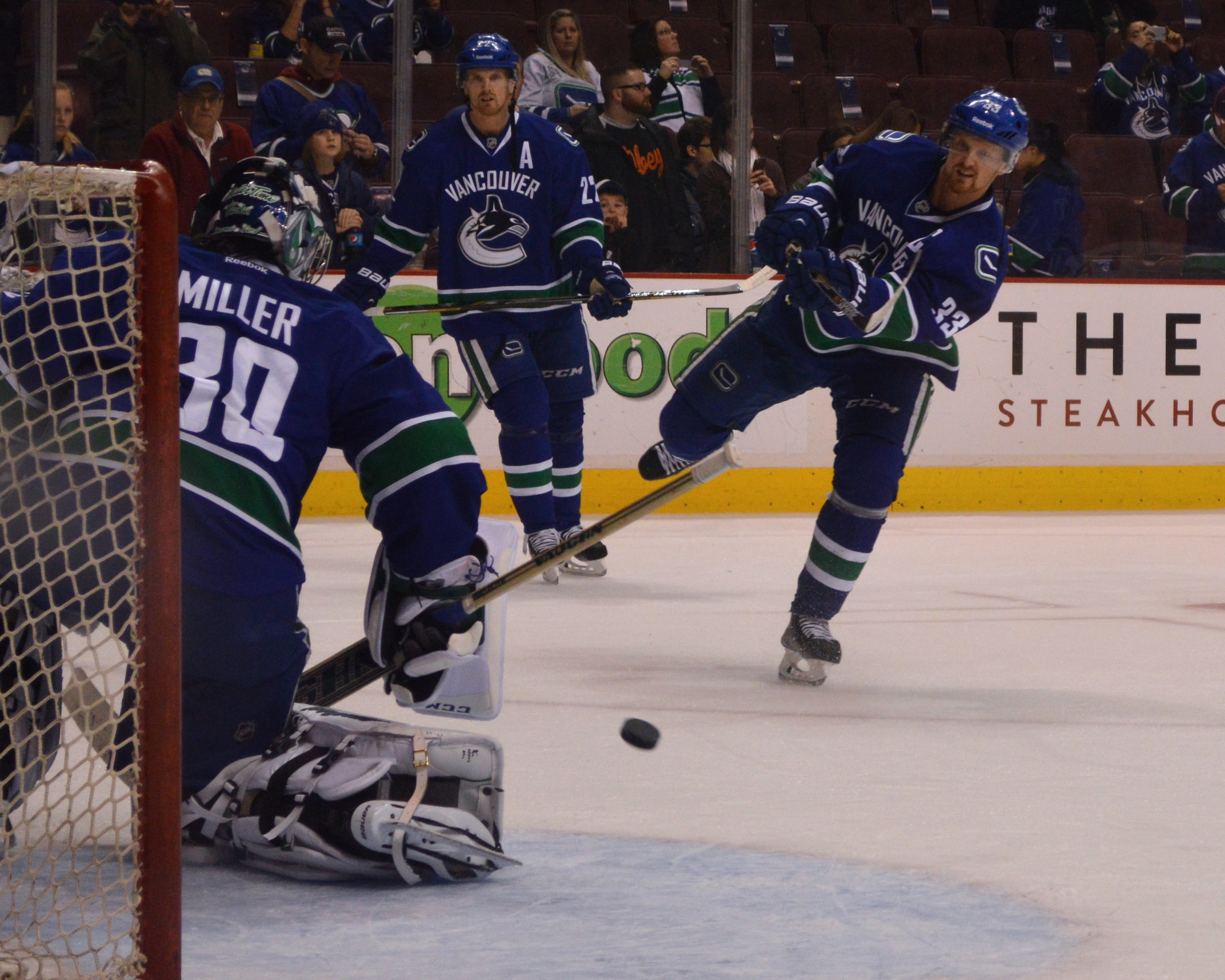
Ryan Miller with Henrik and Daniel Sedin warming up prior to a game in the 2014–15 season. Miller was acquired as a free agent in July 2014.

On May 21, 2014, Jim Benning was announced as general manager, having previously served as assistant general manager of the 2010–11 Boston Bruins championship team that had beaten the Canucks three years prior. On June 23, Willie Desjardins was named the 18th head coach of the Canucks. The team underwent a series of changes under the new management – veteran forward Ryan Kesler was traded to the Anaheim Ducks, veteran defenceman Jason Garrison was traded to the Tampa Bay Lightning and veteran forward David Booth was let go in free agency, while Ryan Miller and Radim Vrbata were signed as free agents. This season saw the team honour former general manager and head coach Pat Quinn, following his death, by renaming a city street after him (Pat Quinn Way) as well as having his family participate in a pregame ceremonial puck drop. The Canucks finished second in the Pacific Division in the 2014–15 season, reaching the 100-point plateau for the ninth time in franchise history. They faced the Calgary Flames in the first round of the 2015 playoffs, losing in six games.

As the team fared poorly throughout the 2016–17 season, more veteran players were traded – Alex Burrows and Jannik Hansen were dealt in an effort to rebuild. On March 25, 2017, the Canucks' 2015 first-round pick Brock Boeser made his NHL debut in his home state of Minnesota. Desjardins and his coaching staff, with the exception of assistant coach Doug Jarvis, were let go at the end of the season, replaced by Travis Green who coached their AHL affiliate in Utica. They also added Nolan Baumgartner, Newell Brown, and Manny Malhotra as assistant coaches.

The 2017–18 season was another poor year for the Canucks, but rookie Boeser was a bright spot for the team. Despite an injury late in the season, Boeser's 29 goals and 55 points in 62 games were enough to place him second in Calder Memorial Trophy voting for rookie of the year. Longtime Canucks Daniel and Henrik Sedin played their final game on April 7, 2018, against the Edmonton Oilers. On June 5, 2018, longtime Canucks' public address announcer John Ashbridge died, having worked in his capacity with the franchise since 1987. During the off-season, Linden stepped down as president of hockey operations.

==== Rebuilding (2018–2021) ====
The 2018–19 season saw the debut of the Canucks' 2017 first-round draft pick, Elias Pettersson. Pettersson broke the Canucks' record for points by a rookie, set by Ivan Hlinka (1981–82) and matched by Pavel Bure (1991–92), and finished with 66 points to lead all NHL rookies, winning the Calder Trophy.

The franchise celebrated its 50th season in the NHL, the 2019–20 season, with a ceremony at the home opener on October 9, 2019. Bo Horvat was named the 14th captain in team history, following a one-year hiatus without a captain with the retirement of long-time captain Henrik Sedin. The 2019–20 season also saw the rookie campaign of Quinn Hughes, who finished the regular season with 8 goals and 45 assists for 53 points in 68 games, finishing as runner-up in Calder Memorial Trophy votes. The Canucks became the first team to have a top two Calder Trophy finalist three years in a row since the Toronto Maple Leafs, who did so when the league only had six teams from 1957 to 1959. On February 12, 2020, Daniel and Henrik Sedin's numbers 22 and 33 were retired before a game against the Chicago Blackhawks. On March 12, 2020, the Canucks and the NHL's season was suspended due to the onset of the COVID-19 pandemic. When the league resumed play, the Canucks won their first postseason series in nine years in the 2020 qualifying round by defeating the Minnesota Wild. They then beat the defending Stanley Cup champions St. Louis Blues in six games in the first round before being eliminated by the Vegas Golden Knights in seven games in the second round.

General manager Jim Benning, head coach Travis Green, assistant coach Nolan Baumgartner, and assistant general manager John Weisbrod were fired on December 5, 2021, after an 8–15–2 start to the 2021–22 season. On the same day, Bruce Boudreau was named the 20th head coach of the Canucks.

=== Jim Rutherford era (2021–2026) ===
==== Patrik Allvin (2022–2026) ====
On December 9, 2021, Jim Rutherford was named president of hockey operations and interim general manager. He hired Patrik Allvin as general manager on January 26, 2022. On January 22, 2023, after weeks of speculation, the Canucks fired head coach Bruce Boudreau and hired Rick Tocchet as the franchise's 21st head coach. As the news broke that Boudreau would be fired while he was still coaching, the Canucks organization faced widespread criticism by fans and journalists mainly directed towards owner Francesco Aquilini, Rutherford and Allvin, for their public mishandling of the coaching switch. Following Horvat's trade to the New York Islanders in exchange for Anthony Beauvillier and Aatu Raty, Quinn Hughes was named the 15th captain in franchise history during the 2023 off-season, making him the youngest captain in the NHL and first American captain of the Canucks.

The 2023–24 season was the first season with Hughes as captain and the first full season with Tocchet as head coach. With low expectations from fans and media at the start of the season, the team started 9–2–1 in their first twelve regular season games, and finished third in the Western Conference en route to winning their first-ever Pacific Division title (and their first franchise division title since 2013). The Canucks qualified for the playoffs for the first time since the expanded playoffs in 2020 and played their first playoff games in Vancouver since 2015. The Canucks defeated their first round opponent, the wild card Nashville Predators in six games, but lost their second round series in seven games to the Edmonton Oilers. Following the season, Tocchet was announced as the winner of the Jack Adams Award and Hughes won the James Norris Memorial Trophy; Allvin was voted as a finalist for the Jim Gregory General Manager of the Year Award.

The Canucks failed to build on the growth shown in the 2023–24 season, and missed the playoffs in the 2024–25 season by just six points. Entering the season without starting goaltender Thatcher Demko due to a knee injury suffered during the 2024 playoffs, the Canucks initially started the season 11–6–3 through the first 20 games but slipped in and out of a playoff spot as the season progressed. The team as a whole struggled to perform consistently due to significant regression from their star players, poor goaltending, injuries, and off-ice issues between players. Star forward Elias Pettersson, who had come off a disappointing playoff run in which he only recorded six points in 13 games, finished the season with just 45 points in 64 games after recording 89 points the season prior. Pettersson also became a focal point in a purported locker room rift with other star forward J. T. Miller, which forced the Canucks to trade Miller on January 31, 2025.

Prior to the start of the 2025–26 season, the Canucks made the controversial decision to acquire forward Evander Kane from the Edmonton Oilers. Kane, who did not play any games in the 2024–25 regular season for the Oilers, became infamous for his well-documented character issues on and off the ice during his previous stints with the Winnipeg Jets and San Jose Sharks. The 33-year-old Kane was viewed as a player who could add physicality and a scoring option in the Canucks' top-6, despite Kane producing only modest point totals and never having scored more than 24 goals while regularly playing on the Oilers' top line with Connor McDavid and Leon Draisaitl.

The team went 9–9–2 through the first 20 games of the season, good enough for a .500 points percentage. However, the Canucks were unable to hold onto a playoff spot beyond the first month of the season. Continued regression from their star players, poor goaltending, and significant injury troubles continued to affect the Canucks' ability to produce consistent efforts on the ice, in addition to a severe regression in their special teams play. Injuries quickly decimated Vancouver's roster, with the team losing eight players who were on the season-opening roster to injuries just 11 games into the season.

By December 4, 2025, the Canucks had fallen to last place in league standings. On December 12, the Canucks traded captain Quinn Hughes to the Minnesota Wild in exchange for Marco Rossi, Liam Öhgren, Zeev Buium and a 2026 first-round draft pick. Following the trade, Vancouver briefly embarked on a four-game winning streak before recording an 11-game winless streak, which included an eight-game losing streak. Without Hughes, the Canucks were forced to enter a rebuild and began trading away veteran players for future assets. On January 19, 2026, the Canucks traded pending free agent Kiefer Sherwood to the San Jose Sharks. At the trade deadline, veterans Conor Garland and Tyler Myers along with mid-season injury replacement acquisitions Lukas Reichel and David Kämpf were also traded.

On April 2, 2026, after a loss to the Minnesota Wild, the Canucks would clinch last place overall in league standings for the first time in 54 years. By the season's end, they had matched the 1998–99 Canucks for the worst points percentage and the least points gained in an 82-game season, both of which stand as the third worst overall in franchise history. The Canucks also finished with the worst home record by any team in the league since the 1995-96 Ottawa Senators.

On April 17, the Canucks fired general manager Patrik Allvin after finishing last in the league. On May 5, the day of the NHL draft lottery, the Canucks lost both lottery picks and dropped from first to third overall in the draft despite holding the best odds to secure the first overall pick. That same day, Jim Rutherford announced that he would be stepping down as president of hockey operations after the 2026 draft, and that he would move into an adviser role.

=== Sedin era (2026–present) ===
==== Ryan Johnson (2026–present) ====
On May 14, 2026, Henrik and Daniel Sedin were promoted from their roles in player development to become co-presidents of hockey operations, and Ryan Johnson was simultaneously promoted to general manager, having previously served in the same role with Vancouver's AHL affiliate, the Abbotsford Canucks. On May 19, the Canucks fired head coach Adam Foote, along with assistant coaches Scott Young, Kevin Dean and Brett McLean. On June 1, the team named Manny Malhotra, who at the time was the head coach of Vancouver's AHL affiliate, the 23rd head coach in franchise history.

== Team information ==
=== Home arenas ===
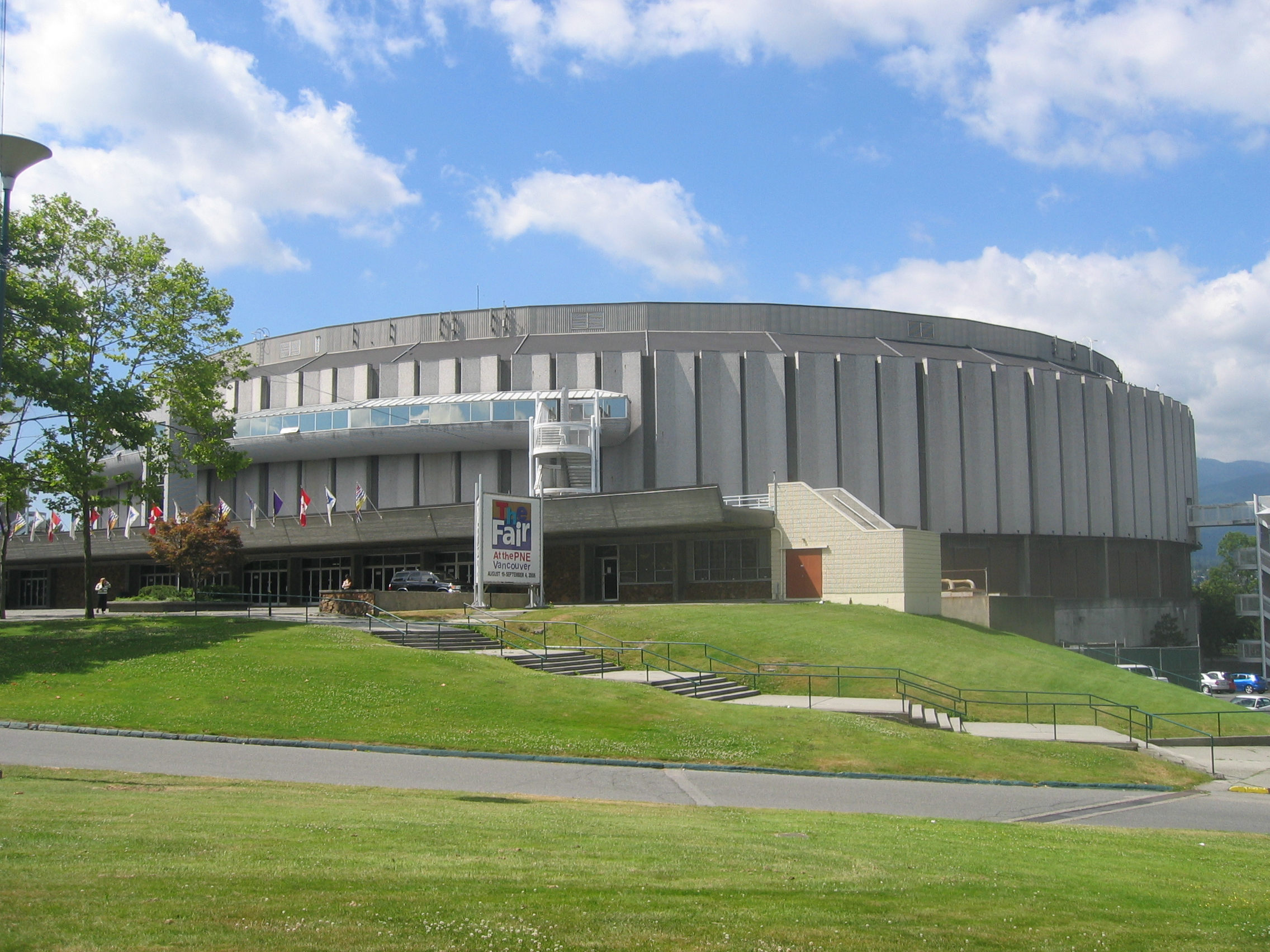
Pacific Coliseum, home of the Canucks from 1970 to 1995

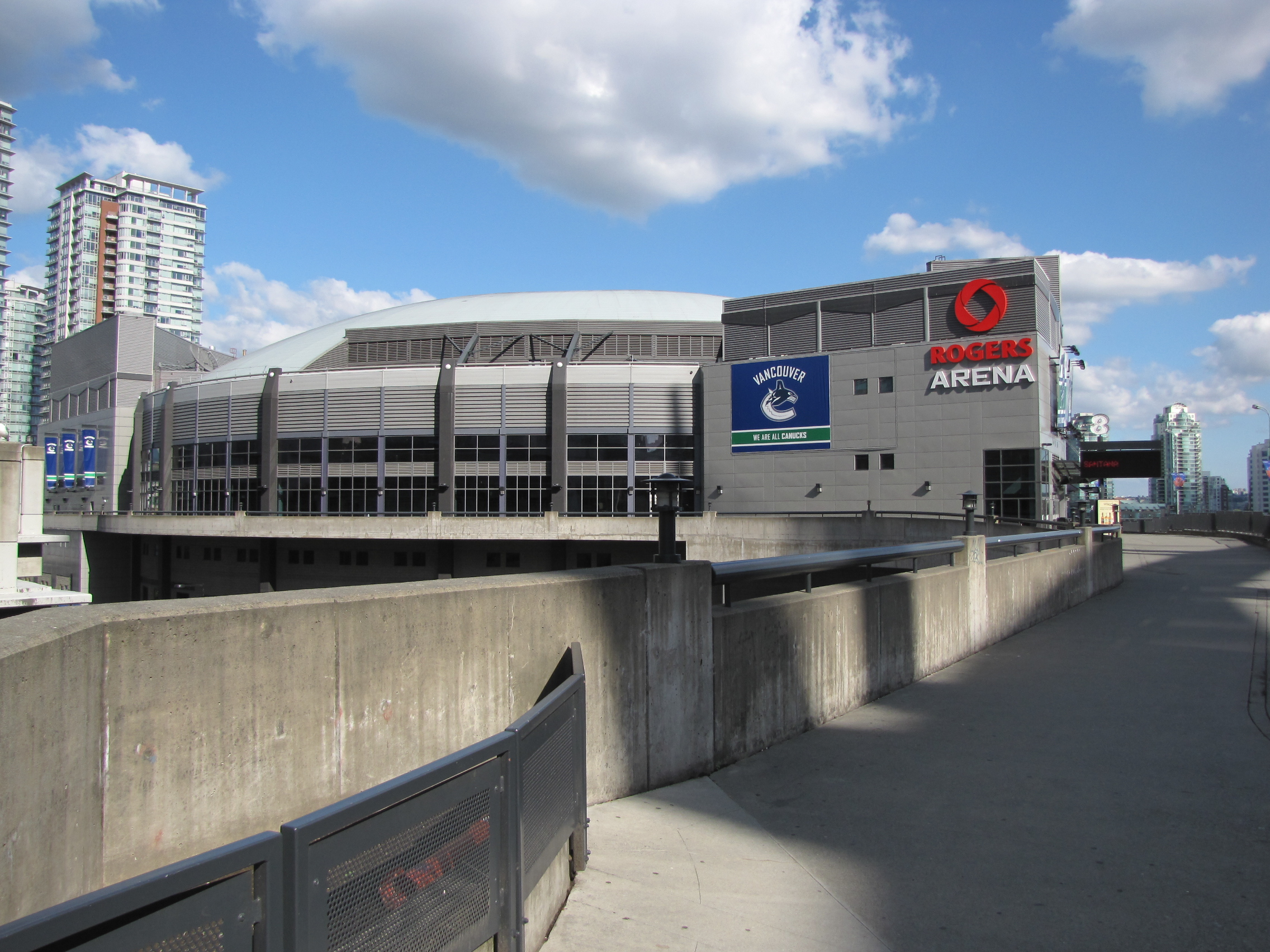
Rogers Arena, current home of the Canucks

The Canucks play their home games at Rogers Arena in downtown Vancouver. The venue opened in 1995 as General Motors Place, and seats up to 18,890 for Canucks games. Rogers Arena was also the main venue for ice hockey games during the 2010 Winter Olympics, where it was temporarily named Canada Hockey Place. The arena is owned and operated by Canucks Sports & Entertainment. Before moving to Rogers Arena, the Canucks played their home games at Pacific Coliseum in Hastings Park for 25 years. The arena holds 16,281 for ice hockey games, though capacity at its opening was 15,713. During the 2010 Winter Olympics, it was the venue for figure skating and short-track speed skating. The Pacific Coliseum was also the home of the Western Hockey League (WHL)'s Vancouver Giants from 2001 to 2016.

=== Logos and jerseys ===
The "Stick-in-Rink", 1970–1978; alternate logo, 2003–2007

The team has gone through four primary logos and six major uniform designs over the years, with numerous minor changes to each, in addition to several alternate logos and jerseys.

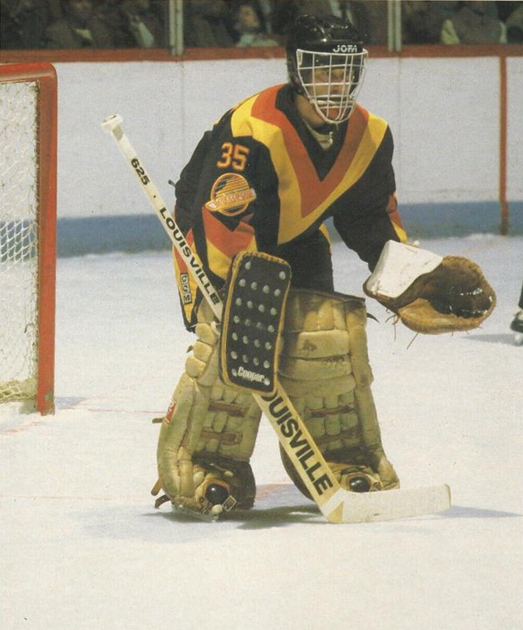
From 1978 to 1985, the Canucks went with a "Flying V" theme (as depicted on goaltender Richard Brodeur) before moving the team's emblem to the front of the jersey

The team's first NHL jerseys, worn from the inaugural season of 1970–71 (modified for the 1972–73 season) until the end of the 1977–78 season, featured a hockey stick in the shape of a shallow "V" superimposed on a blue rink-shaped rectangle forming the letter "C", designed by North Vancouver artist Joe Borovich. During this era, the Canucks wore blue and white jerseys with green stripes, though for the first two seasons, a white "V" adorned the sleeve stripes. A modified version of this logo is still in use, as a shoulder patch on the team's current jerseys and as the primary logo of their alternate jerseys.

In 1978, aiming for a more aggressive image, the organization asked San Francisco-based design agency Beyl & Boyd to design new uniforms. These consisted of a huge, yellow, red-orange and black striped "V" coming down from the shoulders (suggesting "victory", according to its designers). Hockey writer Stephen Cole described it as looking like "a punch in the eye". The colour of the home jerseys changed from white to yellow with the logo and uniform change. The "Flying V" theme, which included several slight modifications over the years, was abandoned in 1985, to feature the team's emblem on the front rather than the "V" (the emblem had previously been worn only on the sleeves; the V's would appear on the shoulders from 1985 to 1989). The logo consisted of the word "Canucks" in a diagonal slant as part the blade of a skate and was designed by San Francisco graphic artist Mike Bull. The logo, with its laser-like design, was sometimes referred to as the "Star Wars" logo, the "waffle iron", the "plate of spaghetti", and most commonly as the "Flying Skate."

The yellow home jerseys were scrapped in 1989 in favour of more conventional white ones, and the triangular shoulder stripes which adorned the post-"V" jerseys were discarded as well. The new incarnation was worn from 1989 to 1992, when a subtle change was made, which went largely unnoticed for the rest of the jersey's lifespan. The orange was changed to red, and the deep "gold" colour was changed to a much brighter yellow, reportedly because jersey-maker CCM no longer produced the required hues. In 1996, an alternate jersey was introduced, retaining the "Flying Skate" logo, but using a salmon colour graduating to black near the bottom. In 1997 the Canucks unveiled a new logo, in which a Haida-style orca breaking out of a patch of ice forms a stylized "C." The logo has been much-maligned, accused of being a blatant reference to their parent company, Orca Bay (now Canucks Sports and Entertainment). At the time, general manager Pat Quinn discussed wanting to have a West Coast colour scheme, and overall West Coast themes in the logo; the colour scheme included blue, red and silver. Beginning in 2001, an alternate jersey was utilized, with contrasting shoulder patches and a blue-to-maroon graduated colour in the body. In 2006, these gradient-coloured alternate jerseys were officially replaced with the popular, royal blue "Stick-in-Rink" uniforms from the 1970s.

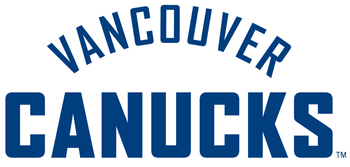
Canucks Wordmark Logo; 2007–present

Little more than halfway through the 2006–07 season, the Canucks announced that they would be changing their jerseys once again. The new uniform was unveiled prior to training camp, on August 29, 2007. It featured the same orca design present on their previous jerseys, but the colour scheme was changed to their "retro" colours of royal blue and kelly green. Additionally, the word "Vancouver" was added to the chest area above the orca. The actual jerseys themselves were changed to the Rbk Edge design, along with all other teams in the NHL. The Vancouver Sun described the new look as "decidedly unpopular."

"The Stick-in-Rink", modified; alternate logo, 2007–2019

On November 14, 2008, prior to their Sport Celebrities Festival, the Canucks released their new RBK Edge Third Jersey. While staying with the colours of Vancouver, and combining the old with the new, the jersey looks very similar to their home jersey. The modernized "Stick-in-Rink" logo unveiled the previous year on the shoulder of the main jerseys is used as the main crest. On the shoulder, a "V" with the head of Johnny Canuck on top is used. This is the first time in team history since joining the NHL that Johnny Canuck has appeared on a Vancouver uniform. Sports Illustrated rated it 13th overall out of the 19 third jerseys released for the 2008 season.

On opening night October 9, 2010, the Canucks revealed jerseys they would wear for select games during their 40th-anniversary season. They look exactly like the jerseys the team wore in their early years, only with the addition of Reebok manufacturing the jerseys. The jerseys sport a '40th Anniversary' patch on the upper-right chest commemorating their 40th season. Just like the early years, they also bear no player names, only numbers, with permission from the NHL.

On August 13, 2015, the Canucks announced that they would be wearing their 1990s Flying Skate jerseys for a February 13, 2016, game against the Toronto Maple Leafs to honour the 20th Anniversary of Rogers Arena. They attempted to do this in the previous season to honour Pat Quinn, but were unsuccessful. The 1990s jerseys were used again for select games in the 2019–20 season (the design was chosen via an online fan vote over two other throwback jerseys) to coincide with the team's 50th anniversary.

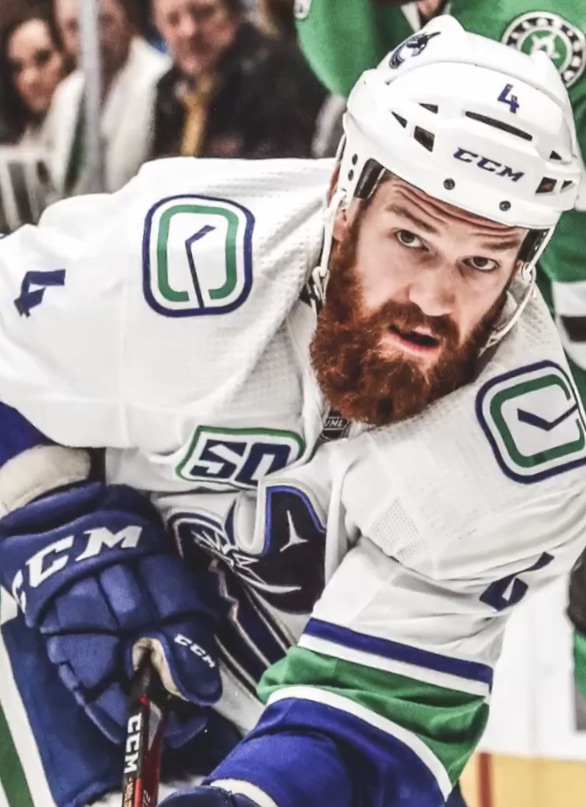
Jordie Benn wearing the Canucks current uniform, featuring a 50th anniversary patch.

On June 14, 2019, the Canucks updated their primary uniforms. The "Vancouver" script was removed while the modern "stick-in-rink" logo was modified with white as the main colour. A new "Heritage" uniform was also released, featuring design elements inspired from their inaugural season uniforms.

For the 2020–21 season, the NHL introduced "Reverse Retro" alternate uniforms. The Canucks' design used was similar to the alternates they wore from 2001 to 2006, but with green replacing maroon. A second "Reverse Retro" design was released in the 2022–23 season, featuring the "Johnny Canuck" logo in front with a blue base and green and beige stripes. The design harkened back to the Canucks uniforms worn during the 1960s.

On January 18, 2023, the Canucks debuted a new version of the black Flying Skate jerseys as their alternate uniform. The design featured a modernized version of the Flying Skate logo minus the white elements, and features thick red and yellow stripes with subtle "V" patterns in homage to the infamous "Flying V" uniforms of 1978–1985. The silhouette of the North Shore Mountains in black and yellow was added on the inside collar. The current Canucks jersey lettering is used in lieu of standard block lettering of the 1990s Flying Skate uniforms. The uniform was first worn on the night the Canucks honoured former player Gino Odjick, who died January 15.

=== Mascot ===
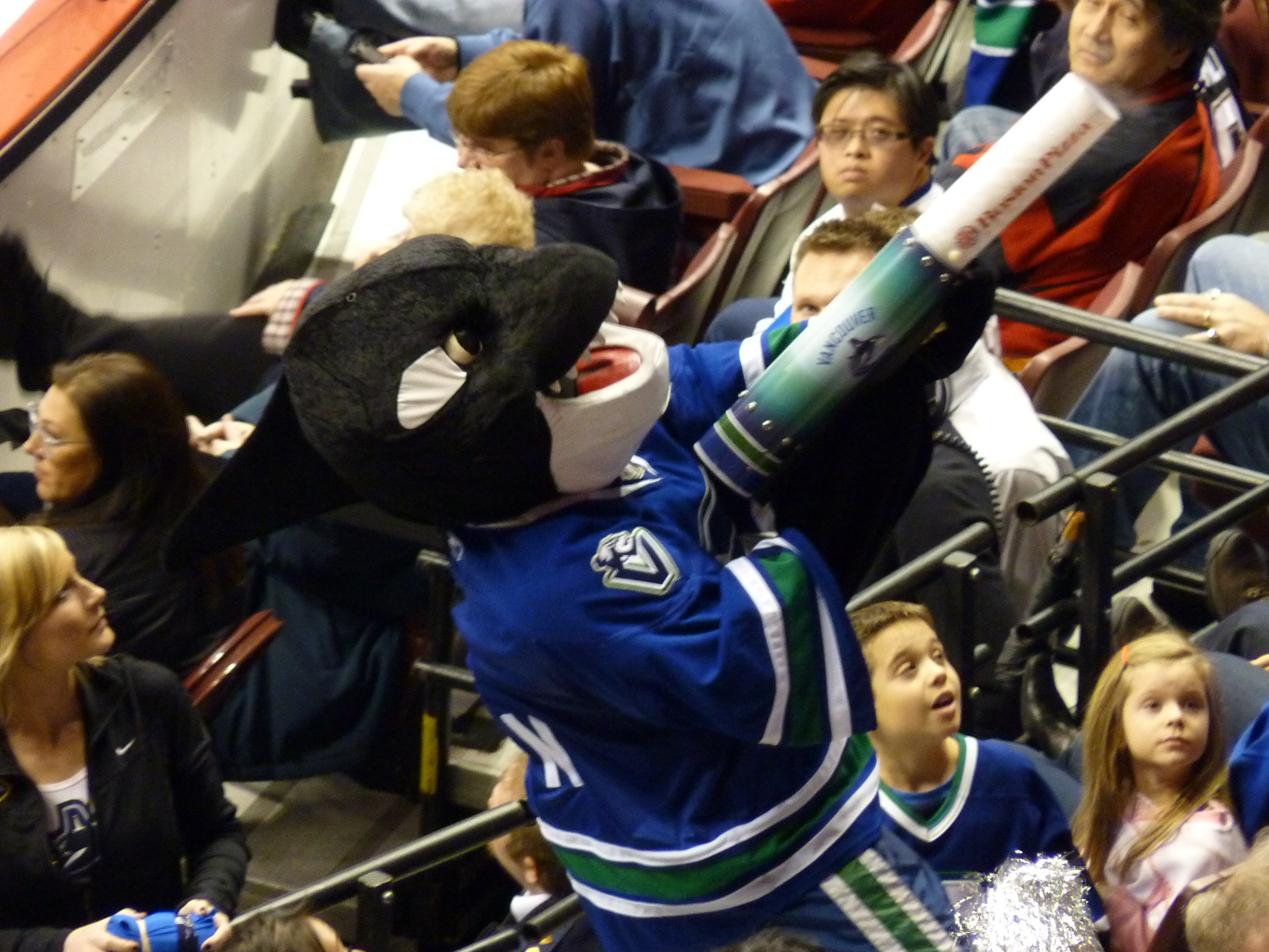
Fin, the official mascot of the Vancouver Canucks, in 2009

The Vancouver Canucks' mascot is an anthropomorphic killer whale (orca) named Fin the Orca. He is often seen banging a First Nations drum or skating around during intermissions firing t-shirts out of a compressed air cannon. On occasion, "smoke" also comes out of the blowhole on his head. Fin is known for his "chomping" where he bites the heads of fans.

Two fans of the Canucks became unofficial mascots of the team at the end of the 2009–10 season, donning zentai-style, skin-tight green bodysuits in slightly different shades of green as The Green Men, and have been known to accompany the team on road games, as they did in the 2011 Stanley Cup Final to the TD Garden against the Boston Bruins. On September 5, 2012, as an acknowledgement of their rising popularity, ESPN inducted The Green Men into the "Hall of Fans", a semi-satirical take on a Hall of Fame. In November 2014, the Green Men announced that 2014–15 would be their final season. After an eight-season absence, the Green Men made two surprise appearances during the 2023–24 season, on February 24, 2024, during a game against the Bruins, and on May 8, 2024, during the Canucks' first game of the conference semifinals against the Edmonton Oilers in the 2024 Stanley Cup playoffs.

=== Media ===
The Vancouver Canucks broadcast area in red

After a relationship with CKNW stretching since the Canucks joined the NHL in 1970, the Canucks entered into a new radio broadcast deal in 2006 with CKST—an AM sports/talk station. John Shorthouse continues to call the play-by-play, as he has since 1999, though with his role on the Canucks' television broadcasts becoming more prominent in recent years. As of 2023, Shorthouse now works the Canucks' TV broadcasts on a full-time basis alongside analysts Dave Tomlinson (primary) and Ray Ferraro (select games). Brendan Batchelor and Randip Janda call Canucks games on radio. The games aired on 14 stations across British Columbia. On March 9, 2017, it was announced that Rogers Media had acquired radio rights to the Canucks under a 5-year deal to begin in the 2017–18 season. On April 25, 2017, Rogers announced that it would acquire CISL from Newcap Radio and convert it to a sports radio format to serve as team flagship. On September 9, 2026, Rogers announced that Vancouver Canucks games would move to CKKS-FM starting in the 2026–27 season, following the shutdown of CISL in July 2026.

Sportsnet and Rogers hold a monopoly on all television broadcasts of the Canucks; regional games are aired by Sportsnet Pacific, and occasionally on the overflow channel Sportsnet Canucks. Sportsnet had held the television rights to the team since 1998. Since 2014, Sportsnet also held the NHL national TV rights in Canada, allowing Canucks broadcasts to be televised nationally on a number of occasions.

=== Ownership ===
The initial owners were Tom Scallen's Medicor group. In 1972, hints of impropriety were circulating about Scallen. He was charged with stock fraud and spent the last two years of his Canuck ownership in prison. In 1974, Scallen and Medicor sold the team to media executive Frank Griffiths. From 1988 to 1997, the Vancouver Canucks were owned by local businessman and philanthropist Arthur Griffiths, who had inherited ownership from his father, Frank. However, he was forced to sell his majority interest in the Canucks after overextending his resources trying to build a new arena, General Motors Place (now known as Rogers Arena). As a result, he sold his majority share to an American billionaire, John McCaw Jr.

On November 17, 2004, the Aquilini Investment Group, headed by Francesco Aquilini, purchased a 50% share in Orca Bay Sports and Entertainment (the owners of both the Canucks franchise and Rogers Arena) from John McCaw Jr. Prior to the sale, Aquilini and two business partners, Tom Gaglardi and Ryan Beedie, had negotiated with Orca Bay for several months without concluding an agreement. In January 2005, Gaglardi and Beedie filed a lawsuit against Aquilini and Orca Bay, alleging that Aquilini and Orca Bay had acted in bad faith in concluding a deal using information obtained from their joint offer.

On November 8, 2006, Aquilini, along with his brothers Roberto and Paolo, purchased the remaining 50% of the Vancouver Canucks and Rogers Arena from McCaw.

In May 2007, Gaglardi and Beedie's civil lawsuit over Aquilini's purchase reached the Supreme Court of British Columbia. The court ruled for Aquilini, on January 10, 2008. The court held that there was no legal partnership between Aquilini, Beedie, and Gaglardi, and that McCaw was free to sell the team to anyone he wished.

On January 29, 2008, the company responsible for operating the Vancouver Canucks and Rogers Arena, changed its name from Orca Bay Sports and Entertainment to Canucks Sports & Entertainment.

== Minor league affiliates ==
=== Top affiliates ===
- 1970–1972 – Rochester Americans (AHL)
- 1972–1975 – Seattle Totems (WHL, CHL)
- 1975–1978 – Tulsa Oilers (CHL)
- 1978–1982 – Dallas Black Hawks (CHL)
- 1982–1988 – Fredericton Express (AHL)
- 1988–1992 – Milwaukee Admirals (IHL)
- 1992–1994 – Hamilton Canucks (AHL)
- 1994–2000 – Syracuse Crunch (AHL)
- 2000–2001 – Kansas City Blades (IHL)
- 2001–2011 – Manitoba Moose (AHL)
- 2011–2013 – Chicago Wolves (AHL)
- 2013–2021 – Utica Comets (AHL)
- 2021–present – Abbotsford Canucks (AHL)

=== Secondary affiliates ===
- 1987–1988 – Flint Spirits (IHL)
- 1991–1992 – Columbus Chill (ECHL)
- 2002–2006 – Columbia Inferno (ECHL)
- 2006–2011 – Victoria Salmon Kings (ECHL)
- 2011–2015 – Kalamazoo Wings (ECHL)
- 2016–2017 – Alaska Aces (ECHL)
- 2017–2021, 2023–present – Kalamazoo Wings (ECHL)

== Season-by-season record ==
This is a partial list of the last five seasons completed by the Canucks. For the full season-by-season history, see List of Vancouver Canucks seasons.

Note: GP = Games played, W = Wins, L = Losses, T = Ties, OTL = Overtime Losses, Pts = Points, GF = Goals for, GA = Goals against

Season	GP	W	L	OTL	Pts	GF	GA	Finish	Playoffs
2021–22	82	40	30	12	92	249	236	5th, Pacific	Did not qualify
2022–23	82	38	37	7	83	276	298	6th, Pacific	Did not qualify
2023–24	82	50	23	9	109	279	223	1st, Pacific	Lost in second round, 3–4 (Oilers)
2024–25	82	38	30	14	90	236	253	5th, Pacific	Did not qualify
2025–26	82	25	49	8	58	216	316	8th, Pacific	Did not qualify

== Players and personnel ==
=== Current roster ===
Updated October 30, 2026

No.	Nat	Player	Pos	S/G	Age	Acquired	Birthplace
13	(Canada)	Arshdeep Bains	LW	L	25	2022	Surrey, British Columbia
6	(United States)	Brock Boeser (A)	RW	R	29	2015	Burnsville, Minnesota
55	(Canada)	Guillaume Brisebois	D	L	29	2015	Longueuil, Quebec
8	(United States)	Zeev Buium (A)	D	L	20	2025	Laguna Niguel, California
77	(Czech Republic)	Filip Chytil	C	L	27	2025	Kroměříž, Czech Republic
47	(United States)	Paul Cotter	C	L	26	2026	Canton, Michigan
74	(Canada)	Jake DeBrusk	RW	L	30	2024	Edmonton, Alberta
35	(United States)	Thatcher Demko	G	L	30	2014	San Diego, California
7	(Canada)	Brendan Gallagher	RW	R	34	2026	Edmonton, Alberta
17	(Czech Republic)	Filip Hronek (A)	D	R	29	2023	Hradec Králové, Czech Republic
94	(Sweden)	Linus Karlsson (A)	C	R	26	2019	Eksjö, Sweden
32	(Finland)	Kevin Lankinen	G	L	31	2024	Helsinki, Finland
88	(Sweden)	Jonathan Lekkerimäki	RW	R	22	2022	Huddinge, Sweden
90	(United States)	Victor Mancini	D	R	24	2025	Hancock, Michigan
31	(Finland)	Leevi Meriläinen	G	L	24	2026	Oulunsalo, Finland
18	(United States)	Drew O'Connor (A)	LW	L	28	2025	Chatham, New Jersey
92	(Sweden)	Liam Öhgren	LW	L	22	2025	Stockholm, Sweden
4	(Canada)	Jamie Oleksiak	D	L	33	2026	Toronto, Ontario
25	(Sweden)	Elias Pettersson	D	L	22	2022	Västerås, Sweden
40	(Sweden)	Elias Pettersson (A)	C	L	27	2017	Sundsvall, Sweden
62	(Canada)	Jacob Quillan	C	L	24	2026	Dartmouth, Nova Scotia
23	(Austria)	Marco Rossi	C	L	25	2025	Feldkirch, Austria
63	(United States)	Max Sasson	C	L	26	2023	Birmingham, Michigan
2	(Canada)	Luke Schenn	D	R	37	2026	Saskatoon, Saskatchewan
5	(Sweden)	Tom Willander	D	R	21	2023	Stockholm, Sweden

=== Retired numbers ===
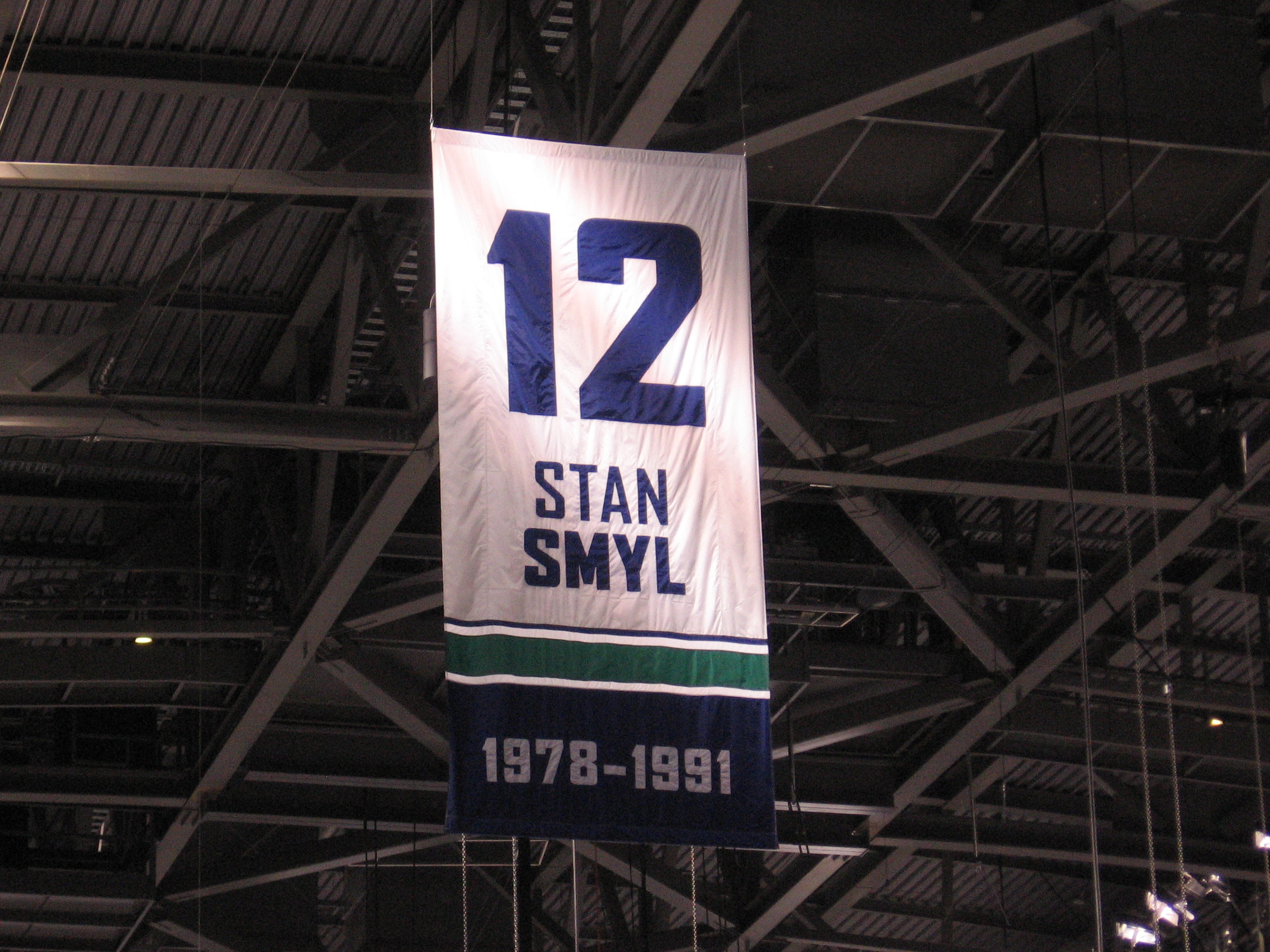
A banner with Stan Smyl's retired number 12

Vancouver Canucks retired numbers
No.	Player	Position	Career	No. retirement
10	Pavel Bure	RW	1991–1998	November 2, 2013
12	Stan Smyl	RW	1978–1991	November 3, 1991
16	Trevor Linden	C/RW	1988–1998; 2001–2008	December 17, 2008
19	Markus Näslund	LW	1996–2008	December 11, 2010
22	Daniel Sedin	LW	2000–2018	February 12, 2020
33	Henrik Sedin	C	2000–2018	February 12, 2020

Notes

- Bure wore number 10 for five of his seven seasons in Vancouver. He wore number 96 during the 1995–96 and 1996–97 seasons before returning to number 10 during the 1997–98 season.
- The NHL retired Wayne Gretzky's #99 for all its member teams at the 2000 NHL All-Star Game.

==== Numbers taken out of circulation ====
- 11 – Wayne Maki, LW, 1970–1973, taken out of circulation following his death from brain cancer on May 1, 1974. Chris Oddleifson (C, 1974–1976) and Mark Messier (C, 1997–2000) are the only Canucks players to have worn it since.
- 28 – Luc Bourdon, D, 2006–2008, taken out of circulation following his death in a motorcycle crash on May 29, 2008. Ian Cole (D, 2023–24) initially chose to wear the number after being acquired by the team, but ultimately switched to #82 before his first game as a Canuck, out of respect for Bourdon and to pay tribute to his memory.
- 37 – Rick Rypien, C, 2005–2011, taken out of circulation following his death from suicide on August 15, 2011.

=== Hall of Famers ===
Several former players and builders from the Canucks have been inducted into the Hockey Hall of Fame. Nine former players have been inducted, and six builders (executives, general managers, head coaches, and owners).

Players

- Pavel Bure
- Igor Larionov
- Roberto Luongo
- Mark Messier
- Alexander Mogilny
- Cam Neely
- Daniel Sedin
- Henrik Sedin
- Mats Sundin

Builders

- Frank Griffiths
- Jake Milford
- Roger Neilson
- Bud Poile
- Pat Quinn
- Jim Rutherford

=== Ring of Honour inductees ===
The Vancouver Canucks Ring of Honour is a collection of permanent in-arena displays, that commemorates individuals that made an impact with the franchise. Inductees to the Ring of Honour include:

- Orland Kurtenbach, C, 1970–1974, inducted on October 26, 2010.
- Kirk McLean, G, 1987–1998, inducted on November 24, 2010.
- Thomas Gradin, C, 1978–1986, inducted on January 24, 2011.
- Harold Snepsts, D, 1974–1984; 1988–1990, inducted on March 14, 2011.
- Pat Quinn, D, 1970–1972; president and general manager, 1987–1997; head coach, 1991–1994; 1996, inducted on April 13, 2014.
- Mattias Öhlund, D, 1997–2009, inducted on December 16, 2016.
- Alex Burrows, RW, 2005–2017, inducted on December 3, 2019.
- Roberto Luongo, G, 2006–2014, inducted on December 14, 2023.

=== Team captains ===
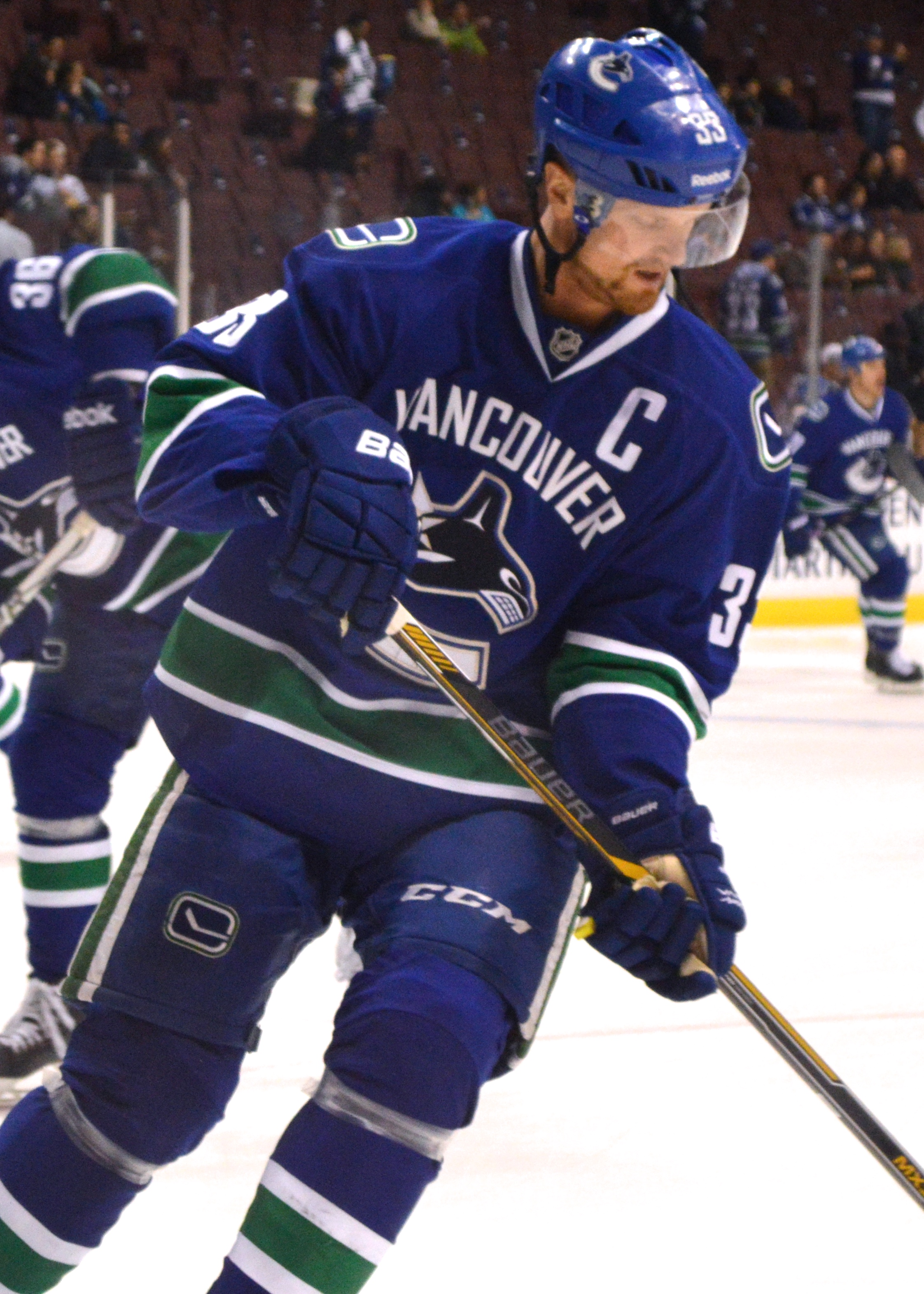
Henrik Sedin was named the Canucks' team captain in 2010. Sedin remained as team captain until his retirement in 2018.

There have been 15 Canucks players who have served as the captain. The franchise's first captain was Orland Kurtenbach, who captained the team until his retirement in 1974. The longest-tenured Canucks captains have been Stan Smyl and Henrik Sedin, who each served as captain for eight seasons; each were also the only captains to have spent their entire NHL career with the Canucks. Swedish winger Markus Naslund, who captained for seven seasons, was the first non-Canadian to have captained the Canucks.

Though goaltenders are not permitted to act as captains during games, Roberto Luongo served as the captain from 2008 to 2010, but because of the NHL rule against goaltender captains, the league did not allow Luongo to serve as on-ice captain. In his place, the three alternate captains were responsible for dealing with officials during games. They also handled ceremonial face-offs. Luongo was not permitted to wear the "C" on his jersey. Instead, he incorporated it into the artwork on the front of one of his masks, which he occasionally wore for the early months of the 2008–09 season.

- Orland Kurtenbach, 1970–1974
- André Boudrias, 1975–1976
- Chris Oddleifson, 1976–1977
- Don Lever, 1977–1979
- Kevin McCarthy, 1979–1982
- Stan Smyl, 1982–1990
- Dan Quinn, Doug Lidster and Trevor Linden, 1990–1991 (tri-captains)
- Trevor Linden, 1991–1997
- Mark Messier, 1997–2000
- Markus Näslund, 2000–2008
- Roberto Luongo, 2008–2010
- Henrik Sedin, 2010–2018
- Bo Horvat, 2019–2023
- Quinn Hughes, 2023–2025

=== Draft picks ===
The Canucks selected Dale Tallon, a defenceman from the Toronto Marlboros with their first pick, second overall in the 1970 NHL amateur draft. In 1978, they drafted Stan Smyl from the New Westminster Bruins. Ten years later, the Canucks also drafted Trevor Linden from the Medicine Hat Tigers in 1988. The Canucks have had 13 top-five draft picks in franchise history, but have never had the first overall pick. The Canucks are one of the two franchises in the NHL to have drafted two twin brothers in the same year. They drafted Daniel Sedin second overall and Henrik Sedin third overall in 1999. Three players from British Columbia have been selected by the Canucks in the first round of an NHL entry draft: Cam Neely in 1983, Jake Virtanen in 2014, and Caleb Malhotra in 2026.

=== Head coaches ===
There have been 23 head coaches for the Canucks. The franchise's first head coach was Hal Laycoe, who coached the Canucks for two seasons. Alain Vigneault coached the most games of any Canucks head coach with 540 games, and has the most points all-time with the Canucks with 683, from the 2006–07 season through the 2012–13 season. He is followed by Marc Crawford, who has 586 points all-time with the Canucks. Vigneault also has the most points in a season of any Canucks coach, with 117 in the 2010–11 season. Roger Neilson and Pat Quinn are the only Hockey Hall of Fame inductees to coach the Canucks. Quinn, Vigneault, and Rick Tocchet are the only three Canucks head coaches to win a Jack Adams Award with the team. Bill LaForge, who coached at the beginning of the 1984–85 season, has the fewest points with the Canucks, with 10. Harry Neale served the most terms as head coach of the Canucks with three while Pat Quinn served two. The current head coach, Manny Malhotra, was hired on June 1, 2026.

== Awards and trophies ==
=== NHL ===
Clarence S. Campbell Bowl

- 1981–82, 1993–94, 2010–11

Presidents' Trophy

- 2010–11, 2011–12

Calder Memorial Trophy

- Pavel Bure: 1991–92
- Elias Pettersson: 2018–19

Jack Adams Award

- Pat Quinn: 1991–92
- Alain Vigneault: 2006–07
- Rick Tocchet: 2023–24

James Norris Memorial Trophy

- Quinn Hughes: 2023–24

Budweiser NHL Man of the Year Award

- Ryan Walter: 1991–92

King Clancy Memorial Trophy

- Trevor Linden: 1996–97
- Henrik Sedin: 2015–16
- Daniel Sedin and Henrik Sedin: 2017–18

Lester B. Pearson Award / Ted Lindsay Award

- Markus Naslund: 2002–03
- Daniel Sedin: 2010–11

NHL Plus/Minus Award

- Marek Malik: 2003–04 (shared with Martin St. Louis of the Tampa Bay Lightning)

NHL Foundation Player Award

- Trevor Linden: 2007–08 (shared with Vincent Lecavalier of the Tampa Bay Lightning)

Scotiabank Fan Fav Award

- Roberto Luongo: 2008–09

Art Ross Trophy

- Henrik Sedin: 2009–10
- Daniel Sedin: 2010–11

Hart Memorial Trophy

- Henrik Sedin: 2009–10

William M. Jennings Trophy

- Roberto Luongo and Cory Schneider: 2010–11

Frank J. Selke Trophy

- Ryan Kesler: 2010–11

NHL General Manager of the Year Award

- Mike Gillis: 2010–11

=== All-Star ===
First All-Star team

- Pavel Bure: 1993–94
- Markus Näslund: 2001–02, 2002–03, 2003–04
- Todd Bertuzzi: 2002–03
- Henrik Sedin: 2009–10, 2010–11
- Daniel Sedin: 2010–11
- Quinn Hughes: 2023–24

Second All-Star team

- Kirk McLean: 1991–92
- Alexander Mogilny: 1995–96
- Roberto Luongo: 2006–07
- Daniel Sedin: 2009–10
- Thatcher Demko: 2023–24
- Quinn Hughes: 2024–25

NHL All-Rookie Team

- Jim Sandlak: 1986–87
- Trevor Linden: 1988–89
- Corey Hirsch: 1995–96
- Mattias Öhlund: 1997–98
- Brock Boeser: 2017–18
- Elias Pettersson: 2018–19
- Quinn Hughes: 2019–20

== Franchise records ==
=== Scoring leaders ===
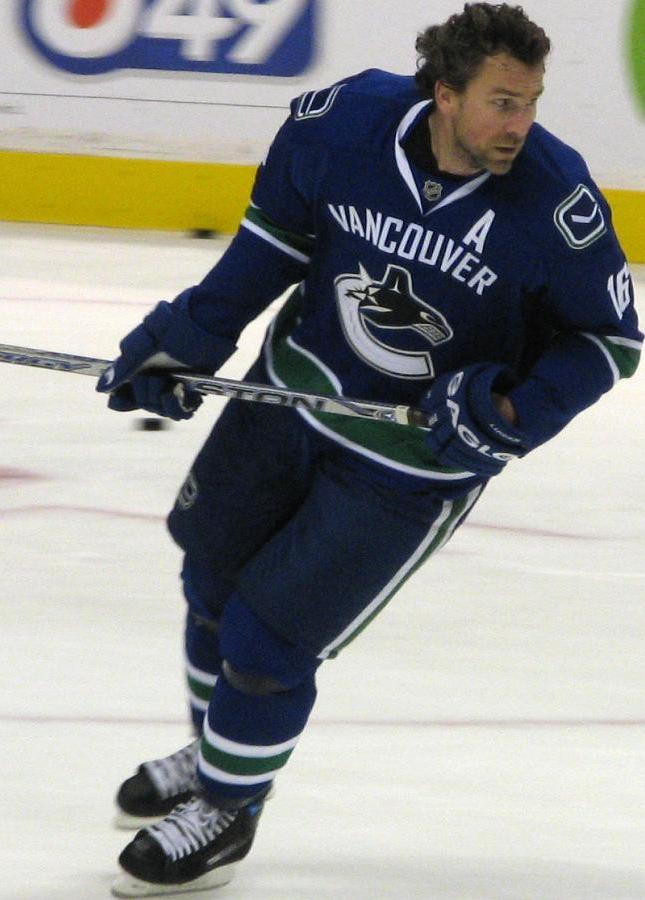
Recording 733 points with the Canucks, Trevor Linden holds the fourth-highest all-time points total in the franchise.

These are the top-ten point-scorers in franchise history. Figures are updated after each completed NHL regular season.

- * – current Canucks player

Note: Pos = Position; GP = Games played; G = Goals; A = Assists; Pts = Points; P/G = Points per game

Points
Player	Pos	GP	G	A	Pts	P/G
Henrik Sedin	C	1,330	240	830	1,070	.80
Daniel Sedin	LW	1,306	393	648	1,041	.80
Markus Näslund	LW	884	346	410	756	.86
Trevor Linden	C	1,140	318	415	733	.64
Stan Smyl	RW	896	262	411	673	.75
Thomas Gradin	C	613	197	353	550	.90
Elias Pettersson*	C	545	200	308	508	.93
Brock Boeser*	RW	629	226	256	482	.77
Pavel Bure	RW	428	254	224	478	1.12
Tony Tanti	RW	531	250	220	470	.89

Goals
Player	Pos	G
Daniel Sedin	LW	393
Markus Näslund	LW	346
Trevor Linden	C	318
Stan Smyl	RW	262
Pavel Bure	RW	254
Tony Tanti	RW	250
Henrik Sedin	C	240
Brock Boeser*	RW	226
Bo Horvat	C	201
Elias Pettersson*	C	200

Assists
Player	Pos	A
Henrik Sedin	C	830
Daniel Sedin	LW	648
Trevor Linden	C	415
Stan Smyl	RW	411
Markus Näslund	LW	410
Quinn Hughes	D	371
Thomas Gradin	C	353
Alexander Edler	D	310
Elias Pettersson*	C	308
Dennis Kearns	D	290

=== Goaltending leaders ===
These are the top-ten goaltenders in franchise history by wins. Figures are updated after each completed NHL regular season.

- * – current Canucks player

Note: GP = Games played; W = Wins; L = Losses; T/O = Ties/Overtime losses; GA = Goal against; GAA = Goals against average; SA = Shots against; SV% = Save percentage; SO = Shutouts

Goaltenders
Player	GP	W	L	T/O	GA	GAA	SA	SV%	SO
Roberto Luongo	448	252	137	50	1,030	2.36	12,693	.919	38
Kirk McLean	516	211	228	62	1,637	3.28	14,424	.887	20
Thatcher Demko*	262	134	99	21	713	2.81	7,851	.909	10
Richard Brodeur	377	126	173	62	1,389	3.88	10,848	.872	6
Dan Cloutier	208	109	68	24	485	2.42	5,153	.906	14
Jacob Markström	229	99	93	27	597	2.73	6,850	.913	5
Gary Smith	188	72	81	23	572	3.33	5,242	.891	11
Ryan Miller	150	64	68	16	394	2.69	4,569	.914	10
Cory Schneider	98	55	26	8	197	2.20	2,715	.927	9
Glen Hanlon	136	43	66	21	461	3.57	3,838	.880	5

=== Individual records ===
As of the 2025–26 season

Skaters

- Most games played in a career – Henrik Sedin, 1,330 (2000–2018)
- Most goals in a career – Daniel Sedin, 393 (2000–2018)
- Most assists in a career – Henrik Sedin, 830 (2000–2018)
- Most points in a career – Henrik Sedin, 1,070 (2000–2018)
- Most penalty minutes in a career – Gino Odjick, 2,127 (1990–1998)
- Most goals in a season – Pavel Bure, 60 (1992–93 and 1993–94)
- Most assists in a season – Henrik Sedin, 83 (2009–10)
- Most points in a season – Henrik Sedin, 112 (2009–10)
- Highest plus/minus in a season – Christian Ehrhoff, 36 (2009–10); Daniel Sedin, 36 (2009–10)
- Most penalty minutes in a season – Donald Brashear, 372 (1997–98)
- Most points in a season, defenceman – Quinn Hughes, 92 (2023–24)
- Most points in a season, rookie – Elias Pettersson, 66 (2018–19)
- Fastest goal recorded by a Canuck – Alex Burrows, 6 seconds (2012–13)

Goaltenders

- Most games played in a career, goaltender – Kirk McLean, 516 (1987–1997)
- Most wins in a career – Roberto Luongo, 252 (2006–2014)
- Most shutouts in a career – Roberto Luongo, 38 (2006–2014)
- Most wins in a season – Roberto Luongo, 47 (2006–07)
- Most shutouts in a season – Roberto Luongo, 9 (2008–09)
- Lowest GAA in a season (min. 30 GP) – Cory Schneider, 1.96 (2011–12)
- Best SV% in a season (min. 30 GP) – Cory Schneider, .937 (2011–12)
