= Thomas Alsbury =

Thomas Alsbury may refer to:

- Thomas Alsbury (Texas settler) (born 1773), Early Texas settler from Old Three Hundred
- A. Thomas Alsbury (1904–1990), Canadian politician
