= Frederick Hume =

Canadian politician

Fred Hume
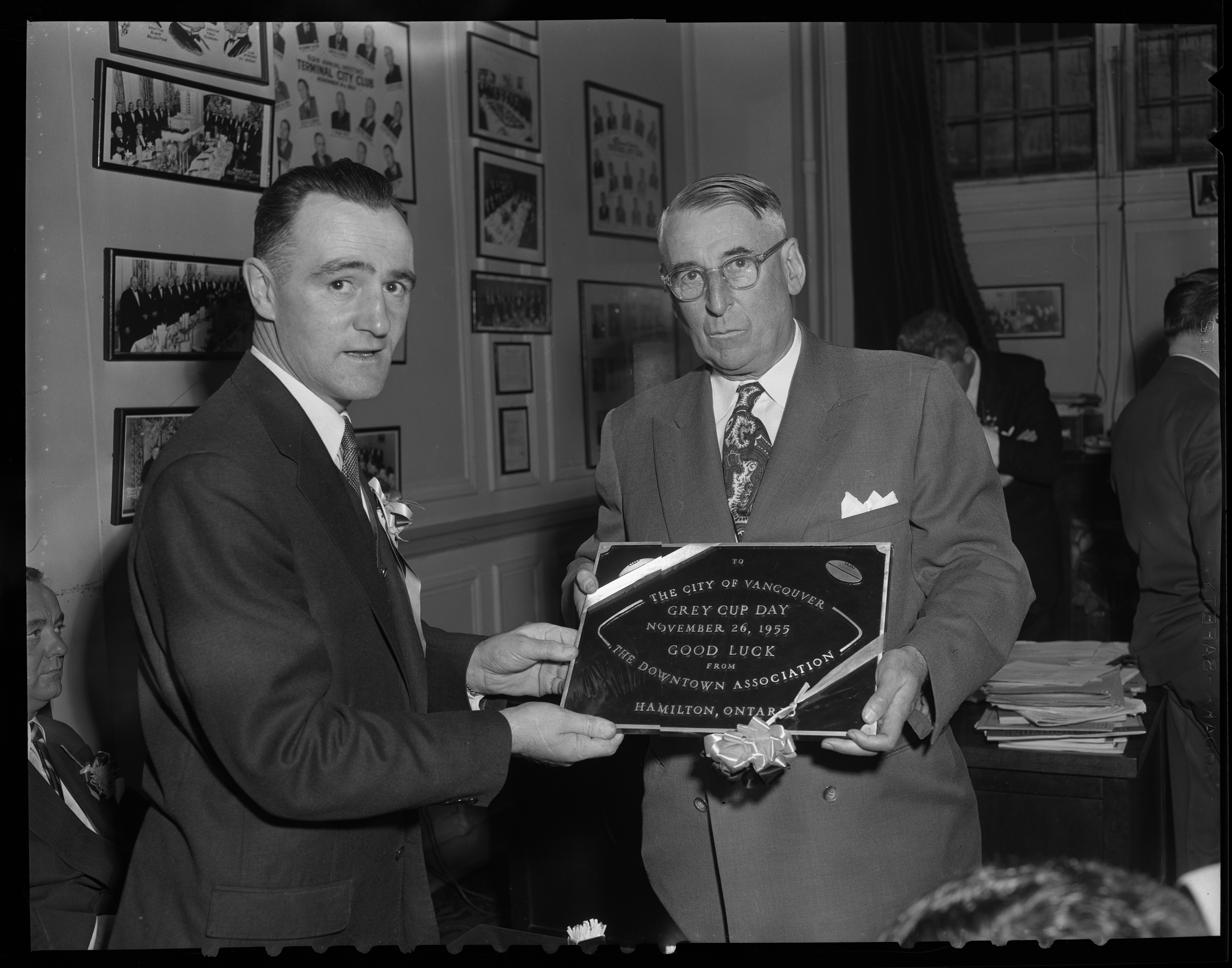
- Hume (right) accepting a plaque for the 1955 Grey Cup.

28th Mayor of Vancouver
- In office 1951–1958
- Preceded by: Charles E. Thompson
- Succeeded by: Albert T. Alsbury

26th Mayor of New Westminster
- In office 1933–1942
- Preceded by: Wells Gray
- Succeeded by: William Mott

Personal details
- Born: May 2, 1892 New Westminster, British Columbia
- Died: February 17, 1967 (aged 74)
- Known for: Owner of Vancouver Canucks; Hockey Hall of Fame, 1962

Frederick John "Fred" Hume (2 May 1892 – 17 February 1967) was the 28th mayor of Vancouver, British Columbia, from 1951 to 1958. He was born in New Westminster, British Columbia, where he served as the mayor from 1933 to 1942. Although he was living in West Vancouver, he won election as Vancouver's mayor.

Hume owned the WHL Vancouver Canucks, and was an active supporter of the NHL expansion to Vancouver. He was inducted to the Hockey Hall of Fame in the "Builders" category in 1962.

The Canucks award for the team's unsung hero is named the Fred J. Hume Award in honour of Hume and his efforts to bring the NHL to Vancouver. The WHL also named the award for the league's most gentlemanly player after Hume.

Hume was inducted into the Canadian Lacrosse Hall of Fame as a builder in 1965, the first year of inductees.

Hume's home in West Vancouver was known for its Christmas-light display, which was taken over and expanded by current owner, Jim Pattison.
