= BCIT School of Business and Media =

Business school in British Columbia, Canada

BCIT School of Business + Media
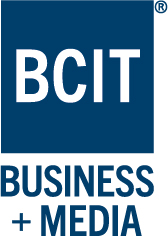
- Motto: Real Experience. Real Results.
- Type: Public, Business school
- Established: 1965
- Dean: Kenton Low
- Faculty: 150 (full-time)
- Students: 2,500 (full-time) 10,100 (part-time)
- Location: Burnaby and Vancouver, British Columbia, Canada; 49.2509°N 123.0005°W (Burnaby campus)
- Colours: Blue Yellow
- Website: bcit.ca/business-media/

The BCIT School of Business + Media is a business school within the British Columbia Institute of Technology (BCIT). In 1965, the School of Business was founded and has campuses located in Burnaby and downtown Vancouver, British Columbia, Canada. Programs are accredited by the Accreditation Council for Business Schools and Programs.

== History ==
- 1965 - BCIT is founded
- 1986 - The Peter Thomson Centre for Venture Development is created
- 1997 - The Downtown Vancouver campus opens
- 2001 - Bell Canada Enterprises (BCE) donates $1.5 million to create the BCE New Media Centre of Excellence
- 2014 - Centre of Excellence in Analytics is created
- 2021 - BCIT and Vancouver International Airport's research lab opens

== Programs ==
The BCIT School of Business + Media offers over 130 credentials that can be completed full-time, part-time, or online. Certificates ladder into diplomas, which ladder into degrees.

=== Diplomas ===
The School of Business + Media has over 20 diploma programs that cover a wide range of business and media specializations. Some of the specializations include accounting, media communications, business administration, digital arts, marketing, and project management. Diplomas are completed in two years full-time or course-by-course on a part-time basis.

=== Bachelor degrees ===
BCIT offers Bachelor of Business Administration and Bachelor of Accounting degrees. Students must complete a BCIT diploma program to enroll into a degree program. Students can complete a bachelor's degree within three years by completing a two-year diploma program and one additional year of business studies. Degree students can complete an international student exchange for a term or year.

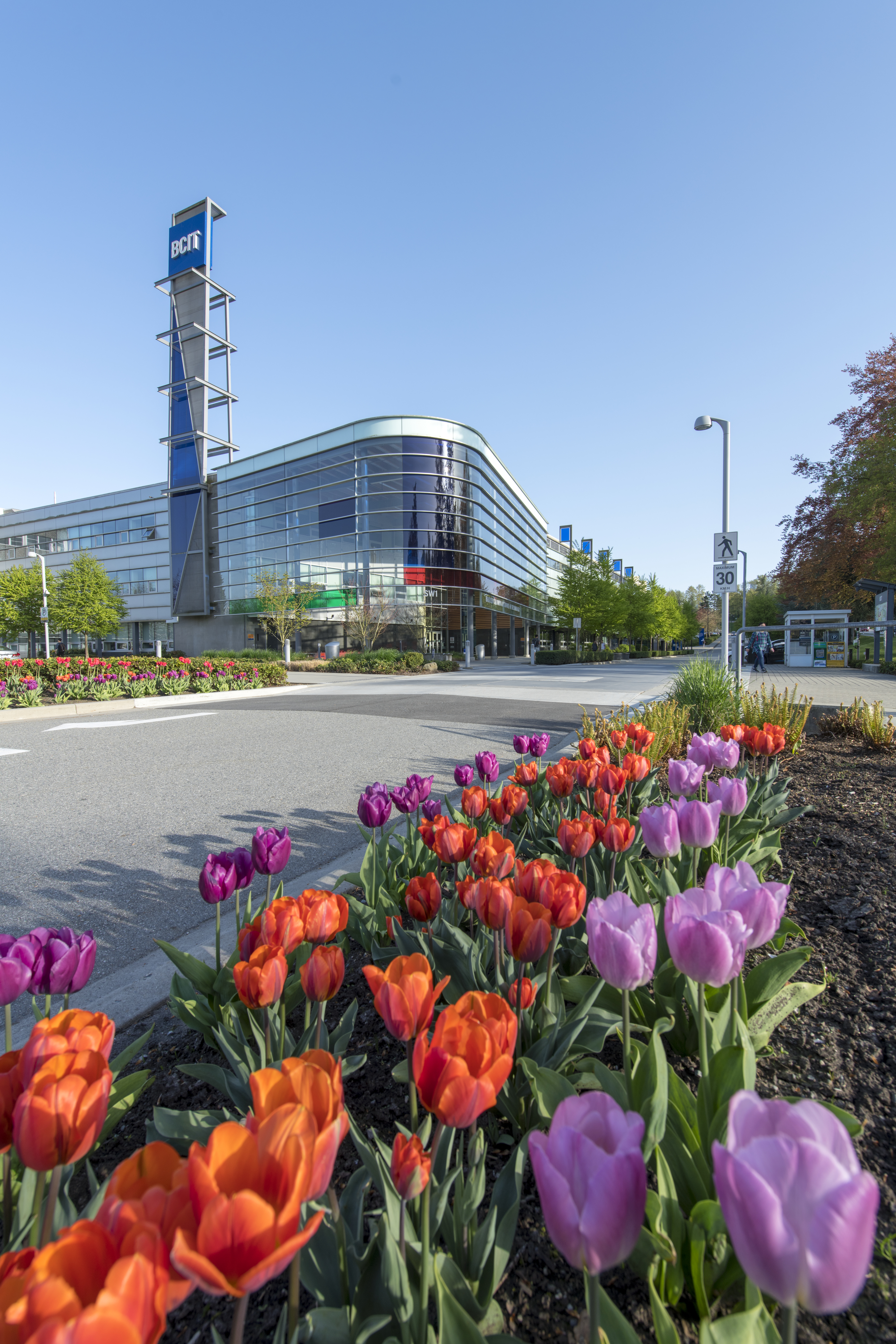
Burnaby campus

=== Graduate certificates ===
BCIT offers three graduate certificate programs: Business Administration (full-time), Business Analytics (part-time) and Global Leadership (full-time).

== Campuses ==
=== Burnaby ===
The Burnaby campus offers the majority of academic programing. Bachelor's degrees, two year full-time diplomas, and part-time certificates are taught at the campus. The main campus is located at 3700 Willingdon Avenue, Burnaby.

=== Downtown Vancouver ===
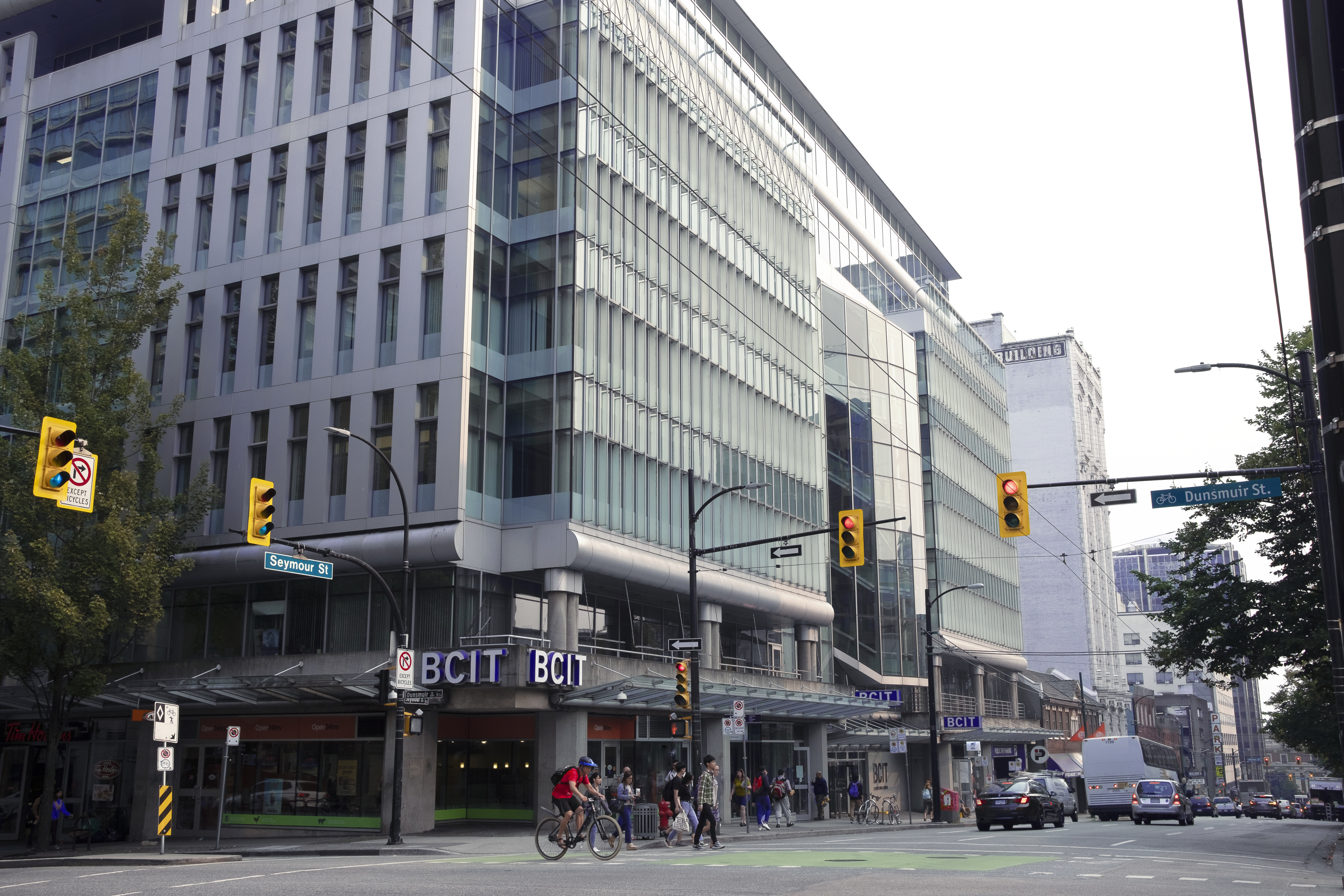
Downtown Vancouver campus

The Downtown Vancouver campus offers part-time business courses. The BCIT Downtown Vancouver Campus is located at 555 Seymour Street, Vancouver.

== Learning model ==
The BCIT School of Business + Media applied business education model prepares graduates for a business career. Students learn in a set of 25–30 other students during the year. Unlike universities, students are automatically enrolled in all of the courses required for that program once accepted into their program. Students maintain a heavy course load consisting of six to eight courses each semester. BCIT semesters are slightly longer than other local universities with the academic year ending in May and graduating in late June.

=== Business consulting projects ===
Business Consulting Projects are 10–16 weeks in duration and provide students the opportunity to work in a consulting role for a real business. A Business Consulting Project is different from traditional co-op or internship programs, as students fill an outside consulting role for an organization.

=== Internships and practicums ===
During the final semester in the diploma programs, students participate in an internship or practicum. An internship program can help students apply their classroom knowledge in a work environment.

=== Advanced Placement and prior learning ===
BCIT provides course credit and advanced placement into diploma and degree programs. In 2014, the BCIT School of Business + Media provided course credit to McDonald's managers who completed courses through McDonald's own corporate training program. In 2015, the Royal Canadian Legion, donated $830,000 to the School of Business to fund the BCIT Legion Military Skills Conversion Program. This program helps Canadian veterans and reservists convert their military skills and knowledge into a business credential.

== Student clubs ==
Students within the BCIT School of Business + Media operate a number of student clubs that compete in regional and international case competitions. The clubs organize industry networking events, guest speakers, and charitable endeavours. The following student clubs are a part of the BCIT School of Business:

- APICS
- BCIT Human Resources Association
- BCIT Financial Management Association (FMA)
- BCIT Finance Association
- BCIT Marketing Association (BCITMA) - Student chapter of the American Marketing Association
- BCIT JDC West
- BITMAN
- Enactus BCIT
- International Business Management
- Meeting Professionals International (MPI)
- Toastmasters International

== International programs ==
The BCIT School of Business + Media has international partnerships with over 20 business schools. It also organizes international field schools to Europe during the summer. BCIT students can spend a semester or year abroad by participating in an international student exchange. Dual degree programs are available for students to earn both a BCIT bachelor's degree and an international bachelor's degree simultaneously. International partnerships exist with the following schools:

- Aarhus University, Institute of Technology (Denmark)
- Artevelde University of Applied Sciences (Belgium)
- Bremen University of Applied Sciences (Germany)
- Ca' Foscari University of Venice (Italy)
- Coventry University (England)
- Fondazione CUOA (Italy)
- Griffith University (Australia)
- Helsinki Metropolia University of Applied Sciences (Finland)
- Inholland University of Applied Sciences (The Netherlands)
- International Christian University (Japan)
- International University of Languages and Media Milan (Italy)
- Kookmin University (South Korea)
- Leonard De Vinci Pole Universitaire (France)
- Linköping University (Sweden)
- Munich University of Applied Sciences (Germany)
- Ternopil National Economic University (Ukraine)
- Toulouse Business School (France)
- Toulouse Business School – Barcelona Campus (Spain)
- University of Applied Sciences and Arts Northwestern Switzerland (Switzerland)
- University of Applied Sciences Berlin (Germany)
- University of Applied Sciences of Vienna (Austria)
- University of Applied Sciences Upper Austria (Austria)
- University for Development (Chile)
- Del Rosario University (Colombia)
- University of Bologna (Italy)
- University of Gloucestershire (England)
- University of Northampton (England)

== Notable alumni ==
- Colin Basran, Mayor of Kelowna
- TC Carling, VP, Hockey Administration, Entertainment & Content, Canucks Sports & Entertainment
- Arthur Griffiths, CEO, Griffiths Sports Ltd.
- Jill Krop, News Director and Station Manager, Global BC
- Mike Killeen, News Anchor, CTV
- Samantha Legge, President, Canada Wide Media
- Gloria Macarenko, New Anchor, CBC
- Clint Mahlman, COO, London Drugs
- Wynne Powell, CEO (retired), London Drugs
- John Shorthouse, Broadcaster, Sportsnet
- Tamara Taggart, News Anchor, CTV
