= Frank Griffiths =

Canadian media executive (1916–1994)

Frank A. Griffiths
- Born: December 17, 1916; Burnaby, British Columbia, Canada
- Died: April 7, 1994 (aged 77); North Vancouver, British Columbia, Canada
- Occupation: media owner
- Known for: Vancouver Canucks owner
- Children: 4; incl. Arthur

Frank A. Griffiths (December 17, 1916 – April 7, 1994) was a Canadian media executive through his company, Western International Communications (WIC).

Griffiths was born on December 17, 1916, in Burnaby, British Columbia. He began in business working for his father's accounting firm from 1939 to 1974. Griffith was married to Emily, had two sons and two daughters.

In 1956, along with Walter Stewart Owen, Griffiths acquired New Westminster radio station CKNW and later established the Western Broadcasting Company Ltd. (forerunner of WIC) as the station's parent company. He expanded to own a number of other radio stations as well as CBC Television and CTV affiliate stations. By 1994, WIC was Canada's largest publicly traded broadcast company, owning eight television stations and 11 radio stations.

Griffith's holding company, Northwest Sports, purchased the Vancouver Canucks in 1974. He saw the team have 15 seasons with a losing record, but reached the 1982 Stanley Cup Finals. Griffiths was vice-chairman of the National Hockey League from 1979 to 1987, and served on the audit committee of the board of governors, to solidify finances of the league's teams. The Canucks set team records in the 1992–93 NHL season, with 46 wins, 101 points, and 346 goals scored. In 1988, he gave majority control of the Canucks to his son, Arthur Griffiths, and was inducted into the builder category of the Hockey Hall of Fame in 1992.

In 1993, the Canucks began construction of their downtown arena, and Griffiths sought an NBA expansion franchise for Vancouver. He died in North Vancouver on April 7, 1994. He previously had cancer, diabetes, heart problems, and pneumonia. He was posthumously inducted into the Canadian Business Hall of Fame in 1994, having died the day before the ceremony. After Griffiths' death, the Canucks for the remainder of the season and playoffs wore a patch with the words "2Pts FG" meaning "2 points for Frank Griffiths" (2 points being earned by an NHL team for winning a game)—Griffiths' signature phrase he used instead of "win". In late April 1994, Northwest Sports was granted an National Basketball Association expansion franchise, with became the Vancouver Grizzlies, led by his son Arthur.

Preceded by Thomas Scallen	Owner of Vancouver Canucks; 1974–1988	Succeeded by Arthur Griffiths
