= Harbanse Singh Doman =

Canadian forester and businessman (1932–2007)

Doman Industries

Personal details
- Born: August 18, 1932 Paldi, Hoshiarpur district, Punjab, India
- Died: July 24, 2007 (aged 74) Duncan, British Columbia
- Spouse: Harjinder "Helen" Kaur Doman née Lashman

Harbanse Singh Doman (August 18, 1932 – July 26, 2007), commonly known as Herb Doman, was a Canadian forester, forestry industrialist, and the chairman of Doman Industries.

== Early years ==
From shipping, Doman progressed to sawmilling when his customers wanted more wood than his suppliers could provide. "I built the company up for my father, for his family and for the family name," Doman says of his father. The senior Doman, had worked in the industry, logging the big timber of the Cowichan Valley and at one point (1905) leased a mill to cut timber for the Canadian Pacific Railway.

In 1953, Herb along with his younger brothers, Ted Doman and Gordon Doman, founded Doman Lumber Company, and 1955 incorporated as Doman's Lumber & Transport Ltd..

Doman's first mill was the humble, Nanoose Forest Products.

== Later years ==
In 1980 Doman Industries formed Western Forest Products as a joint venture with two other BC forest companies. In the 1990s there were severe financial problems, culminating in the Doman Scandal. In 2004 Western Forest Products acquired the assets of Doman Industries.

When Doman purchased timber tenures and sawmills from Pacific Forest Products in 1997, he over-extended himself. Twice in the past he successfully rode market cycles and he trusted that markets would pick up as they had before, boosting revenues to cover the debt incurred by the purchase. But in 1998, the Japanese market, which he was counting on, crashed in the Asian meltdown.

== Personal life ==
Herb had two brothers, Ted and Gordon Doman, and a sister, Mahinder. Herb had four children with wife Harjinder "Helen" Kaur Doman (née Lashman) -- daughters Darcia, Sherry, Verinda, and son, Jaspaul (Rick).

The youngest, Rick Doman (born November 1962) is now the president and CEO of EACOM Timber Ltd. Rick works and lives in Montreal QC, the headquarters of EACOM since its acquisition of the forest division of Domtar in 2010.

Rick ran Doman Industries until its acquisition in 2004. He was handling the company's international sales in 2001 when he was asked to take over as chief executive from his father who had suffered a severe stroke.

Nephew, Amar Doman (son of Ted Doman) runs one of B.C.'s largest private companies, Futura Corporation, as well as CanWel, one of Canada's largest building materials companies. On August 18, 2021, Amar was introduced as the owner of the BC Lions of the CFL.

== Controversies ==
In 1996, former B.C. Premier, Bill Bennett was convicted under B.C. securities laws of insider trading involving the sale of shares in Doman Industries, two years after he stepped down as premier. This was known as the Doman Scandal. A British Columbia Securities Commission panel imposed trading sanctions against Herb and ordered him along with brothers Bill and Russell Bennett, to pay the commission $1 million to cover the costs of an insider trading case that spanned 11 years.

In 2008, Herb's will was contested by Deborah Lynn Peri, who claimed to be the daughter of Herb and Helen Doman. DNA tests showed she was not Herb's daughter but was that of his wife, Helen. Peri's claim was thus denied by the courts.

== Legacy ==
Doman is known for his loyalty to his community, his friends and his family. For example, despite being advised to move the company's head office to Vancouver, Doman stayed in Duncan, building a three-storey office building—turning it into the economic hub of the Cowichan Valley. "Everybody said you couldn't have a head office in Duncan but of course I had to prove differently. We built here. People get here."—Herb Doman

"My father's contribution to coastal British Columbia (B.C.), and particularly Vancouver Island, was that he created over four thousand jobs for people and their families, and built the business from scratch from the age of twelve."—Rick Doman

"By and large, I always had a good relationship with Herb Doman. He was an excellent lumberman, and probably the most efficient producer on the coast. I considered Herb a friend of mine, and I am very sorry to hear of his passing."—Jack Munro, former president of the International Woodworkers of America, the most powerful of the B.C.'s resource unions

"Kind of an icon in the forest industry that either doesn't exist or is rare in B.C. now, where it is a family business. We've seen such a shift in the forest industry to large corporations, large companies, many of them owned outside B.C." --Carole James, former Leader of the Opposition in British Columbia, and former leader of the British Columbia New Democratic Party (NDP)

"This is the passing of a key figure in the history and building of the forest industry on the Coast. Very few people have accomplished and contributed the way Herb Doman has in his lifetime."—Reynold Hert, president and CEO of Western Forest Products Inc.
