= Arthur Griffiths (businessman) =

Canadian businessman

Arthur R. Griffiths
- Born: 1957 (age 68–69)
- Known for: Vancouver Canucks, Vancouver Grizzlies owner
- Children: 5

Arthur R. Griffiths (born 1957) is a Canadian businessperson, philanthropist, and former candidate for political office. He is former owner of the Vancouver Canucks, Vancouver Grizzlies, and General Motors Place. He chaired the Vancouver/Whistler 2010 Bid Society which helped to bring the 2010 Winter Olympics to the region. Griffiths ran unsuccessfully as the BC Liberal candidate for a 2008 provincial byelection in the Vancouver-Burrard riding. In June 2016, Griffiths was inducted to the British Columbia Sports Hall of Fame and is the recipient of the W.A.C. Bennett Award, which is given "to an individual who has made a significant, unique and lasting contribution to sport in the Province of British Columbia."

== Professional sports ==
Griffiths is the son of Emily and Frank Griffiths. The Griffiths family, including Arthur, were inducted into the British Columbia Hockey Hall of Fame in 1995 under the builder category. The induction noted "In addition to his duties as owner of the team, Arthur Griffiths was also actively involved at the league level as a member of the NHL's Marketing / Public Relations Committee."

The younger Griffiths inherited his father's ownership stake in the Vancouver Canucks in 1988. It was Griffiths who led the initiative to build GM Place. The original arena of the Canucks, the Pacific Coliseum, was owned by the Pacific National Exhibition. The old coliseum became unsuitable for the growing team, and as result Griffiths financed the building of GM Place in 1995.

Griffiths sold the Vancouver Canucks in 1997.

Griffiths was also responsible for the formation of the NBA's Vancouver Grizzlies, who began play in 1995. The Grizzlies were sold and eventually moved to Memphis, Tennessee in 2001.

== 2010 Winter Olympics ==
In 1998, Griffiths was invited to chair the not-for-profit Vancouver/Whistler 2010 Bid Society. In December 1998, the Bid Society obtained the Canadian Olympic Committee's endorsement of Vancouver's bid to host the 2010 Games, so that the bid could be presented before the International Olympic Committee (IOC). In 2002, the Vancouver/Whistler 2010 Bid Society was replaced by Vancouver 2010 Bid Corporation.

On July 2, 2003, the International Olympic Committee announced that it had awarded the 2010 Winter Olympics to Vancouver/Whistler, beating competing bids from Salzburg, Austria, and Pyeongchang, South Korea. The successful bid represented the first Winter Olympic Games to be awarded to Canada since Calgary won its bid for the 1988 Winter Olympics.

== Business career ==
Griffiths began working in the front office of the Vancouver Canucks in 1981 at the age of 23 when the NHL franchise was controlled by his father, Frank Griffiths, Sr. He assumed full control of the team in 1988 and his father died in 1994, months before the team's run to the Stanley Cup Final. In 1995, the Vancouver Grizzlies joined the NBA as an expansion team under Griffiths' ownership. On November 12, 1996, Griffiths sold his remaining interest in Orca Bay Sports and Entertainment, the entity that owned the Canucks and Grizzlies, to his Seattle business partner, billionaire John McCaw.

Griffiths oversaw hospitality for Russian sportswear brand Bosco at the 2012 Summer Olympics in London and the 2014 Winter Olympics in Sochi.

On February 26, 2019, Griffiths joined the Board of Directors and was appointed Chief Executive Officer of Vancouver-based cannabis company, World Farms Corp.

== Canuck Place ==
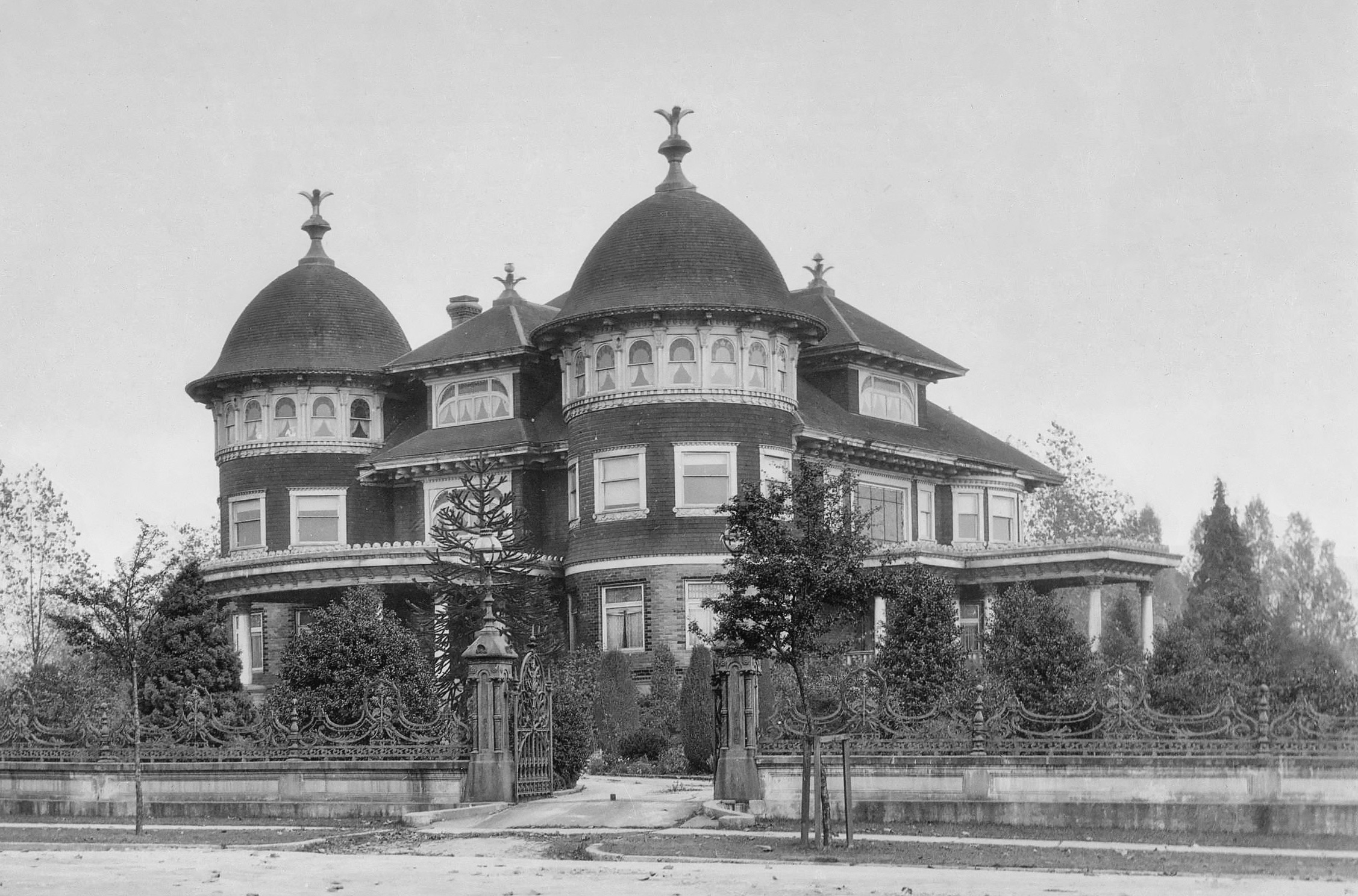
Canuck Place in 1925 - at the time the headquarters of the Ku Klux Klan in Canada

In 1991 Griffiths was the owner of the Vancouver Canucks and controlled its community service arm, the Canuck Foundation. In that year he met Brenda Eng and George Jarvis, who had the idea and passion to create a children's hospice in the lower mainland. With the support of the Canuck Foundation, and other prominent organizations, Canuck Place opened its doors in 1995 in Glen Brae, a historic mansion that previously served as the Imperial Palace of the Kanadian Knights of the Ku Klux Klan.

From Canuck Place's official website, "Canuck Place is the first free-standing hospice for children in North America and its model of care has been used for many hospices..." "The goal of this specialized care, known as pediatric palliative care, is to enhance the comfort and quality of life for both the child and their family. It is achieved through the combination of active and compassionate therapies. Palliative care strives to support children and families by assisting them in fulfilling their physical, psychological, social and spiritual goals while remaining sensitive to personal, cultural and religious values, beliefs and practices."

== BC Liberal Candidate for Vancouver-Burrard ==
On May 20, 2008, Griffiths announced plans to run for the BC Liberal nomination for the newly created Vancouver-West End provincial riding. However, due to Lorne Mayencourt's subsequent resignation as MLA of the defunct Vancouver-Burrard riding to run in the 2008 Canadian federal election, Griffiths ran in the ensuing by-election under the old boundaries, and was defeated by NDP candidate Spencer Chandra Herbert. Griffiths did not contest the Vancouver-West End riding. In the 2009 election, the BC Liberal candidate was Laura McDiarmid.

== Education ==
Griffiths graduated from BCIT in 1980.

== Personal life ==
He is married and currently living in Vancouver.

Sporting positions
Preceded by Frank Griffiths	Vancouver Canucks owner 1988–1997	Succeeded by John McCaw Jr.
New creation	Vancouver Grizzlies owner 1995–2000	Succeeded by Michael Heisley
