= Bill Bennett =

Canadian politician (1932–2015)

The Honourable Bill Bennett PC OBC
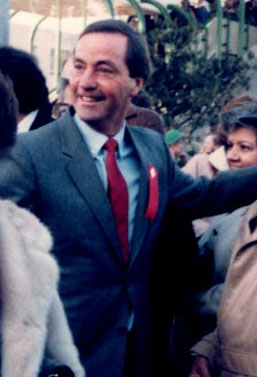
- Bennett in 1985

27th Premier of British Columbia
- In office December 22, 1975 – August 6, 1986
- Monarch: Elizabeth II
- Lieutenant Governor: Walter S. Owen; Henry P. Bell-Irving; Robert G. Rogers
- Deputy: Grace McCarthy
- Preceded by: Dave Barrett
- Succeeded by: Bill Vander Zalm

Leader of the Opposition in British Columbia
- In office November 24, 1973 – December 22, 1975
- Preceded by: Frank Richter Jr.
- Succeeded by: William King

Leader of the British Columbia Social Credit Party
- In office November 24, 1973 – July 30, 1986
- Preceded by: W. A. C. Bennett
- Succeeded by: Bill Vander Zalm

Member of the British Columbia Legislative Assembly for Okanagan South South Okanagan (1973–1979)
- In office September 7, 1973 – October 22, 1986
- Preceded by: W. A. C. Bennett
- Succeeded by: Clifford Jack Serwa; Larry Chalmers

Personal details
- Born: William Richards Bennett; April 14, 1932 Kelowna, British Columbia, Canada
- Died: December 3, 2015 (aged 83) Kelowna, British Columbia, Canada
- Party: Social Credit
- Children: 4
- Parent: W. A. C. Bennett (father)

William Richards Bennett, PC OBC (April 14, 1932 – December 3, 2015) was a Canadian politician who served as the 27th premier of British Columbia from 1975 to 1986. He was leader of the Social Credit Party from 1973 to 1986 and represented the electoral district of Okanagan South (formerly South Okanagan) in the Legislative Assembly from 1973 to 1986.

== Early life ==
Bennett was the son of Annie Elizabeth May (Richards) and former premier W. A. C. Bennett. His father was also named William but was usually called "W. A. C." in the media or "Cece" by his friends. To distinguish the son from his father, he was usually called "Bill."

== Political career ==
=== In opposition (1973–1975) ===
Following his father’s resignation from the legislature, Bennett was elected on September 7, 1973, in a by-election to fill the vacant seat of South Okanagan as the Social Credit candidate.

Bennett was elected leader of the Social Credit Party in November 1973 at a convention in Whistler, British Columbia. He immediately set about building a professional political organization modelled closely on Bill Davis’s Ontario “Big Blue Machine,” drawing on staff lent by the Ontario Progressive Conservatives. Dubbed the “Baby Blue Machine,” the new structure helped Bennett forge a broader coalition of Liberals, social conservatives, and the corporate sector—marking a clear departure from his father’s more populist base of support.

=== Premier of British Columbia (1975–1986) ===
Bennett became premier of the province following the 1975 provincial election, in which the Social Credit Party defeated the New Democratic Party government of Premier David Barrett. The party was re-elected with a reduced majority in the 1979 election and won a larger majority in the 1983 election. His cabinet included figures such as Pat McGeer, Grace McCarthy, Bill Vander Zalm, Garde Gardom, Rafe Mair, and Jim Nielsen. Bennett remained in office until August 6, 1986.

In 1978, Bennett played a key role in establishing the BC Winter Games and BC Summer Games. An award named in his honour was presented by him in 2008 in his hometown of Kelowna, host of that year’s BC Summer Games.

Bennett’s government invested heavily in major projects associated with Expo 86 in Vancouver, including BC Place, the SkyTrain rapid transit system, and the Vancouver Trade and Convention Centre. It also constructed the Coquihalla Highway at a cost of hundreds of millions of dollars, with the non-union Kerkhoff Construction Company as the main contractor. The government distributed free shares in the British Columbia Resources Investment Corporation (BCRIC) to British Columbians and spent more than $1 billion on the Northeast coal project to stimulate employment.

== Controversies ==
In 1996, Bill Bennett was convicted under BC securities laws of insider trading involving the sale of shares in Doman Securities, a Duncan, BC company, ten years after he stepped down as premier. That was known as the Doman Scandal. A British Columbia Securities Commission panel imposed trading sanctions against Russell James Bennett and Harbanse Singh Doman and ordered them along with Bill Bennett to pay the commission $1 million to cover the costs of an insider trading case that spanned 11 years.

British Columbia Resources Investment Corporation (BCRIC or "Brick") (Social Credit Party), a holding company formed under the government of William R. Bennett, was a public boondoggle involving publicly distributed and soon-worthless shares of a former Crown Corporation. Shares briefly rallied and then dropped and settled at less than one dollar.

Bennett's tenure also included megaprojects such as the Coquihalla Highway, which cost approximately $848 million.

== Retirement ==
Though still reviled by the left, Bennett remains generally highly respected among conservatives in BC, who view his rule as a "golden era" compared to the governments of Social Credit premier Bill Vander Zalm and the New Democratic Party premiers who succeeded him. In his later years, Bennett advised past BC premier Gordon Campbell, who openly stated his desire to emulate the policies associated with Bennett's government.

OBC ribbon

In 2007, Bennett was appointed to the Order of British Columbia, BC's highest award for achievement. The new replacement bridge across Okanagan Lake in Kelowna is named after him.

== Illness and death ==
Bennett was diagnosed with Alzheimer's disease around 2007 and, in his later years, lived in a long-term care facility. He died on December 3, 2015, at the age of 83.
