= Joseph Allen Harris =

Canadian politician who discovered Promethium (1900–1972)

Member of the Legislative Assembly of British Columbia
- In office 1933–1937
- Preceded by: James William Jones
- Succeeded by: Cecil Robert Bull
- Constituency: South Okanagan

Personal details
- Born: July 8, 1900 Long Preston, West Riding of Yorkshire
- Died: February 6, 1972 (aged 71) Richmond, British Columbia
- Party: British Columbia Liberal Party
- Spouse: Yvonne Cornelius
- Education: University of British Columbia; University of Illinois at Urbana–Champaign; Paris-Sorbonne University
- Occupation: Research Chemist

Joseph Allen Harris (July 8, 1900 – February 6, 1972) was a Canadian politician. He served in the Legislative Assembly of British Columbia from 1933 to 1937 from the electoral district of South Okanagan, a member of the Liberal party. He did not seek a second term in the Legislature in the 1937 provincial election. A research chemist, he was a discoverer of Promethium (element 61).
