= British Columbia Resources Investment Corporation =

Holding company

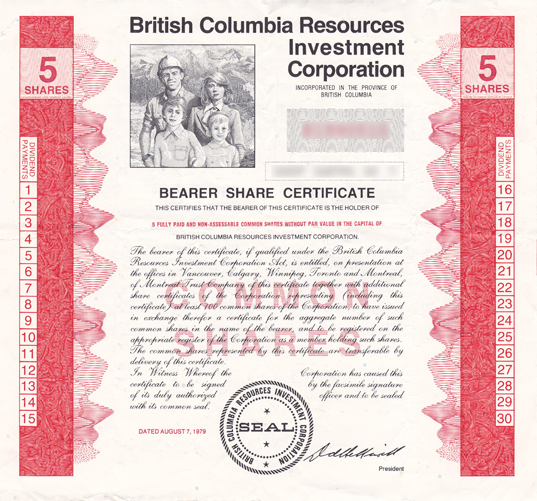
- BC Resource Investment Corporation - Bearer Share Certificate - 5 Shares

The British Columbia Resources Investment Corporation, or BCRIC (pronounced "brick"), was a holding company formed under the government of William R. Bennett. The company took over ownership of various sawmills and mines that had been bought and bailed out by the government. The name was eventually changed to Westar Group Ltd.

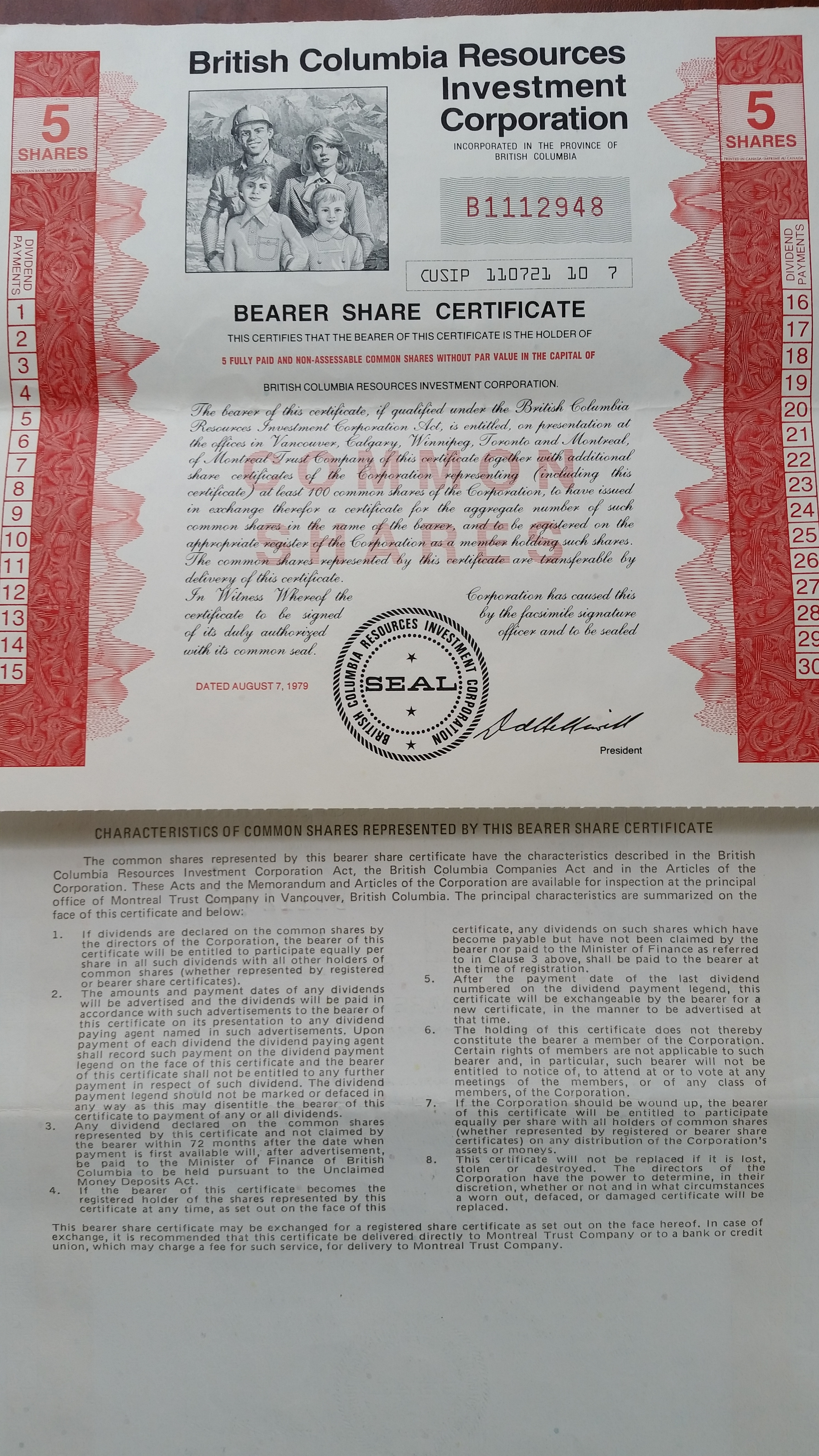
British Columbia Resources Investment Corporation Share certificate both sides

The most famous aspect of the company were the five free bearer shares, dated August 7, 1979, which were distributed to all British Columbians, to promote investment in the province, and earn back a profit to the buyer. British Columbians and investors were encouraged to buy more. The company expanded and bought numerous mining and logging installations.

Because of significant investment in a North Sea oil play by a subsidiary, Westar Petroleum, and bad timing in a mining investment by another subsidiary, Westar Mining, the company ran into financial trouble. Investors saw their thousands of dollars dwindle to pennies.

In 1995, the shares were consolidated at a ratio of 125 to 1. At the time, five bearer shares were worth 0.8% of a post-consolidation share. In June 1997, the consolidated shares were subject to a compulsory buy-out at $70 each ($0.56 per bearer share) as part of a privatization transaction by the Jim Pattison Group. However, the buyout had a 10-year limit, which expired on June 30, 2007, and so outstanding share certificates no longer have any value.
