= Francesco Aquilini =

Canadian businessman and sports owner

- Born: Francesco Aquilini; 1960 (age 65–66); Vancouver, British Columbia, Canada
- Education: Simon Fraser University (BBA)
- Occupations: Chairman, Canucks Sports & Entertainment
- Spouse: Taliah Aquilini (m. 1994; div. 2013)
- Children: 4

Francesco Aquilini (born 1960) is a Canadian businessman, investor, and is the current chairman and owner of the Vancouver Canucks. He is a managing director of Vancouver-based Aquilini Investment Group, the parent company of several diverse subsidiaries. The company is best known for its ownership of the Vancouver Canucks and Rogers Arena, where Aquilini sits as Chairman and NHL Governor. Aquilini is also chairman of Canadian digital media company Enthusiast Gaming.

== Early life and family business ==
Francesco Aquilini was born and raised in Vancouver, British Columbia. Aquilini attended Templeton Secondary School. He went on to graduate from Simon Fraser University with a degree in Business Administration. He later earned an MBA from UCLA Anderson School of Management.

His father, Luigi Aquilini, emigrated in 1953 from Travagliato, Brescia, Italy, to Vancouver. He started Aquilini Investment Group in the 1960s and is still active in the company operations and decision making. Having come to Canada from Italy in the mid-1950s, Luigi started his own construction company, working in East Vancouver during the 1960s and 1970s. In the 1980s, he bought and sold older buildings in Vancouver, Ontario and Quebec. He then began buying land to build new condominium towers. Francesco and his two brothers, Roberto and Paolo, began working in the company during the 1980s and are now all managing directors.

In May 2019, it was found that the Aquilini family had underpaid 174 migrant workers at their berry farm in Pitt Meadows. The office of the Director of Employment Standards ordered the Aquilinis to repay $133,632.56 in back wages, vacation pay and interest to temporary foreign workers brought in from Guatemala to work at its Golden Eagle Blueberry Farm in the summer of 2018.

== Aquilini Investment Group ==
Aquilini, along with his brothers and father, oversees several subsidiaries:

=== Vancouver Canucks and Rogers Arena ===
The Canucks are a professional ice hockey team based in Vancouver. On November 17, 2004, Aquilini purchased a 50% share in Orca Bay Sports and Entertainment (the owners of both the Canucks franchise and Rogers Arena) from John McCaw, Jr. On November 8, 2006, Aquilini purchased the remaining 50% of the Vancouver Canucks and Rogers Arena. In May 2007, Gaglardi and Beedie's civil lawsuit over Aquilini's purchase reached the Supreme Court of British Columbia. The court ruled for Aquilini, on January 10, 2008. The court held that there was no legal partnership between Aquilini, Beedie, and Gaglardi, and that McCaw was free to sell the team to anyone he wished. Aquilini and Gaglardi knew each other from the many joint family events they had attended over the years. Their fathers (Luigi and Bob) were longtime friends and commercial allies. Both families are still majority partners in the proposed Garibaldi At Squamish resort north of Vancouver.

=== Aquilini Developments ===
Aquilini Developments owns and develops real estate. The company is primarily focused on Vancouver and the Lower Mainland, but has holdings across Canada, in the US, and Italy. Recent residential and mixed use developments in Greater Vancouver include Tsawwassen Shores in Delta, Seymour Village in North Vancouver, and the Willingdon Lands redevelopment in Burnaby. The company has also built two residential towers around Rogers Arena. Other recent acquisitions include an acre of land in downtown Moncton, NB and a golf course redevelopment and commercial land in Chilliwack, BC.

Aquilini Developments, in partnership with the Gaglardi family, is the proponent of the proposed $3.5B Garibaldi at Squamish resort.

=== Aquilini Properties ===
Aquilini Properties owns and manages hotels and other income-producing properties across Canada. Aquilini Properties owns five office towers across Canada and has half ownership of Halifax-based Pacrim Hospitality Services, which owns and manages 30 hotels across Canada. These include the Embassy Suites hotel in Montreal, the Holiday Inn Express in East Vancouver, The division also owns all 48 Pizza Hut locations in BC.

The company previously owned one of the largest rental complexes in Canada, the West Edmonton village.

=== Golden Eagle Group ===
Golden Eagle Group operates a variety of recreational and agricultural businesses within 5,000 acres (2,000 ha) of prime agricultural land. This is the single largest land holding in the Greater Vancouver Area. This includes two 18-hole golf courses, a western town movie set, real estate, and a 400-acre (160 ha) hardwood tree nursery. The Group also owns and manages one of the world's larger blueberry and cranberry growing and processing operations.

=== Aquilini Renewable Energy ===
Aquilini Renewable Energy, led by John Negrin, is looking for opportunities in green energy, including waste-to-power and wind power. The division earned community and media attention for a proposal in 2008 and 2009 to build a petroleum waste reduction and recycling plant near Christina Lake, a lake that is popular with summer vacationers.

== Personal life and philanthropy ==
In his early 20s, Aquilini married Dusty Martel, then a local radio personality at CFMI. They had one child but were soon divorced. In 1994, he married Taliah Aquilini and the couple had four children together. They divorced in 2013.

Aquilini is the Chair and primary sponsor of the Italian Gardens (Il Giardino Italiano) in Hastings Park. His company has given significant support to the BC Children's Hospital. Francesco is also a regular participant and contributor to the East End Boys Club, which provides mentorship for at-risk young men in BC.

The Aquilini Investment Group also supports land conservation and wildlife habitat protection, including contributing to the purchase of the Codd Wetlands in Pitt Meadows to protect the area. Additionally, a 104-hectare (260-acre) site adjacent to Blaney Bog Regional Park was renamed the Aquilini Land Conservancy to recognize their significant financial contribution that helped permanently protect the area.

Under the Canucks brand, Aquilini has hosted many charity groups at Canucks games and supports a number of charitable organizations, including: the Canucks for Kids Fund, to support childhood health and wellness, with specific programs aimed at issues like childhood diabetes; the Canucks Autism Network (CAN), which provides adaptive sports, recreational, social and arts programs for children, teens and young adults living with autism in British Columbia; and the Canuck Place Children's Hospice, which provides care for sick children in BC.

=== Allegations of child abuse ===
On September 27, 2022, four of Aquilini's children testified in sworn affidavits before the British Columbia Supreme Court that they had been physically and psychologically abused by their father. Aquilini denied the allegations.

The National Hockey League subsequently released a statement saying: "Clearly, the parties have been involved in a most contentious divorce. Mr. Aquilini has advised us that he categorically denies the allegations. We plan to continue to monitor the situation and, if necessary, will respond as we learn more as events unfold."

=== NHL Governor profile ===
Francesco Aquilini has developed a reputation as the most meddlesome owner in professional sports. In Bleacher Report's list of "The 7 Most Meddlesome Owners in Sports Since 2000," an NHL executive described him as "impulsive, unrealistic … always ranting. Then he'd be apologetic," pointing to a pattern of interference in hockey operations that created organizational instability.

In The Athletic's 2025 NHL Owner Rankings, Aquilini was ranked 31st out of 32 NHL owners, second worst in the league behind only Buffalo's Terry Pegula. Canucks fans rated ownership 30th in franchise stability and 31st in treatment of the fan base, with survey responses criticizing his refusal to permit a proper rebuild under Jim Benning and his tendency to micromanage team decisions.

== See also ==
- Canucks Sports & Entertainment
- Vancouver Canucks

Sporting positions
Preceded by John McCaw Jr.	Vancouver Canucks owner 2004–present Served alongside: John McCaw Jr. (2004–2006)	Incumbent
