= Cecil Robert Bull =

Canadian politician (1890–1978)

Member of the Legislative Assembly of British Columbia
- In office 1937–1941
- Preceded by: Joseph Allen Harris
- Succeeded by: W. A. C. Bennett
- Constituency: South Okanagan

Personal details
- Born: October 25, 1890 British India
- Died: July 15, 1978 (aged 87) Kelowna, British Columbia
- Party: British Columbia Liberal Party
- Spouse: Frances Joyce Harvey
- Children: 1
- Occupation: fruit grower

Cecil Robert Bull (October 25, 1890 – June 15, 1978) was a Canadian politician. He served in the Legislative Assembly of British Columbia from 1937 to 1941 from the electoral district of South Okanagan, a member of the Liberal party. He was an unsuccessful candidate for reelection in the 1941, 1952, and 1956 provincial elections.
