= W. A. C. Bennett =

Canadian businessman and politician

The Honourable W. A. C. Bennett PC OC
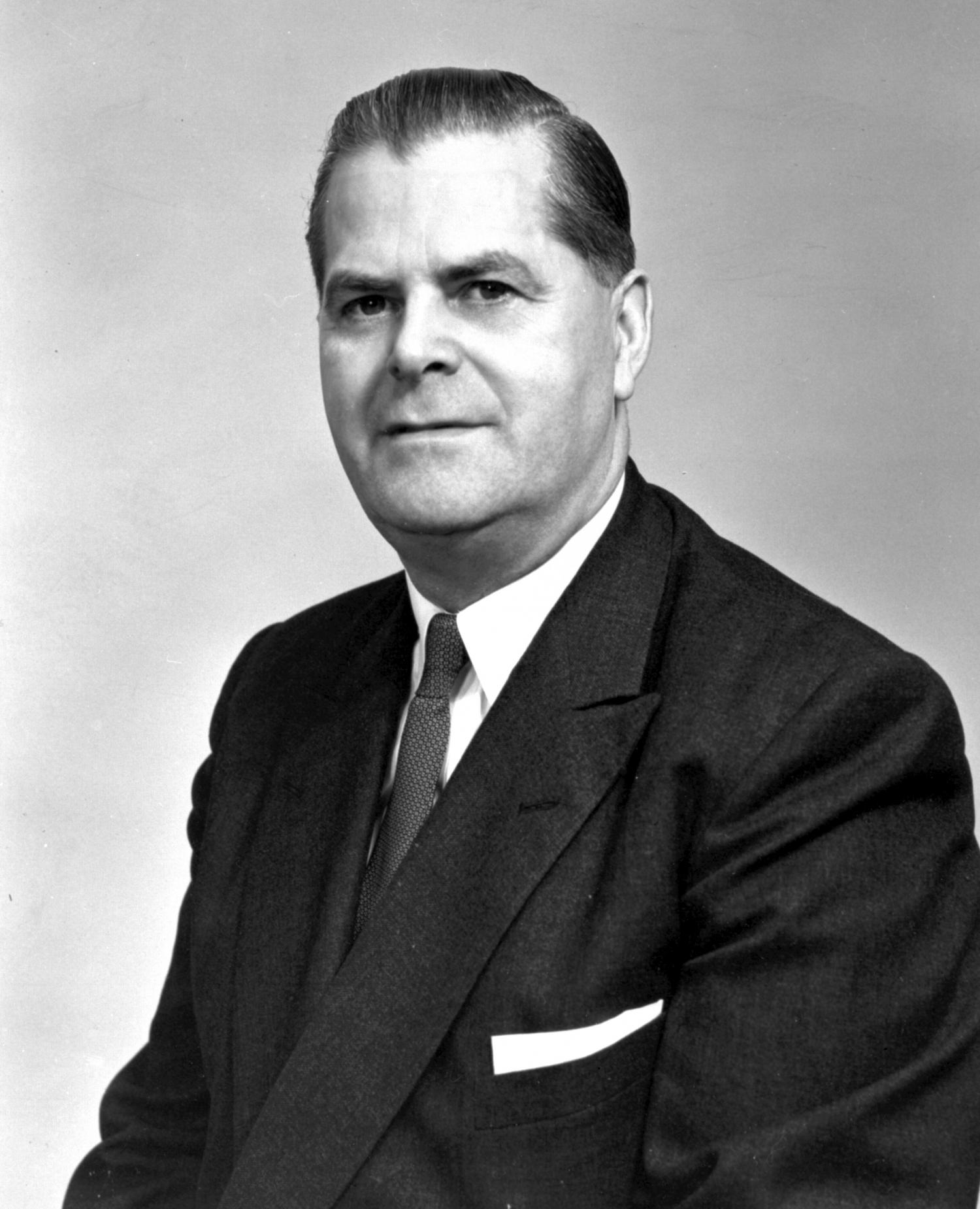
- Bennett in 1956

25th Premier of British Columbia
- In office August 1, 1952 – September 15, 1972
- Monarch: Elizabeth II
- Lieutenant Governor: Clarence Wallace; Frank Mackenzie Ross; George Pearkes; John Robert Nicholson
- Preceded by: Byron Ingemar Johnson
- Succeeded by: Dave Barrett

Member of the British Columbia Legislative Assembly for South Okanagan
- In office October 21, 1941 – May 17, 1948
- Preceded by: Cecil Robert Bull
- Succeeded by: Robert Denis Browne-Clayton
- In office June 15, 1949 – June 5, 1973
- Preceded by: Robert Denis Browne-Clayton
- Succeeded by: Bill Bennett

Personal details
- Born: William Andrew Cecil Bennett; September 6, 1900 Hastings, New Brunswick, Canada
- Died: February 23, 1979 (aged 78) Kelowna, British Columbia, Canada
- Party: BC Conservative (1937–1951); Social Credit (1951–1978)
- Spouse: Annie Elizabeth May Richards (m. 1927)
- Children: 3, including Bill

William Andrew Cecil Bennett PC OC (September 6, 1900 – February 23, 1979) was a Canadian politician who served as the 25th premier of British Columbia from 1952 to 1972. With just over 20 years in office, Bennett remains the longest-serving premier in British Columbia history. He was a member of the Social Credit Party (Socreds).

Notable achievements by the Bennett government included the adoption of BC's first provincial flag, the establishment of the second Bank of British Columbia, and the creation of BC Hydro and BC Ferries. Bennett led the Socreds to a total of seven consecutive election victories. Though he led the party to defeat in the 1972 election, his son Bill Bennett led it to victory in the 1975 election and served as premier until 1986.

== Early and family life ==
William Andrew Cecil Bennett was born on September 6, 1900, in Hastings, New Brunswick, Canada, one of five children of Andrew Havelock Bennett and Mary Emma Burns. His father was a third cousin of Richard Bedford Bennett, eleventh Prime Minister of Canada.

Bennett left formal school in grade nine, during the First World War, to take a job in a hardware store. As an adult, he pursued correspondence courses to improve his knowledge and job potential. He joined the Air Force, but the war ended before he saw active duty. At the age of 18, he and his family moved to Edmonton, Alberta, and then to Westlock, Alberta, where Bennett's father operated a hardware store.

In 1927 Bennett married Annie Elizabeth May Richards. In 1930 they moved to Victoria, and then Kelowna with their two children, Anita and R.J. A third child, William, was born in 1932. In Kelowna, Bennett joined such fraternal organizations as the local Gyro Club, Masonic Lodge, and the Kelowna Club, and was active with his family in the United Church of Canada.

He was usually referred to as W. A. C. Bennett, although some referred to him either affectionately or mockingly as "Wacky" Bennett. To his close friends, he was known as "Cece".

== Early business career ==
Bennett opened a hardware store in 1927, in partnership with another man, and married May Bennett soon afterwards. Bennett was able to sell his interest just before the 1929 Stock Market crash. He decided to leave the tough Alberta economic conditions and moved with his family to the Okanagan Valley, in the interior of British Columbia, settling in Kelowna. There he opened his own hardware store, known as Bennett's Hardware. A successful merchant, he served as president of the Kelowna Board of Trade from 1937 to 1939.

In 1932 Bennett, Giuseppe Guezzi, and Pasquale "Cap" Capozzi established a wine-making company to produce wine from the vast surplus of Okanagan apples that were going to waste during the Depression. Three years later Bennett and Capozzi, both teetotalers, concluded that there was no market for their apple wines. They switched to making wines from California grapes. In 1936 they established Calona Wines, the name a phonetic spelling of Kelowna. Bennett departed the company in 1940 to enter politics.

== Enters politics ==
Bennett joined the British Columbia Conservative Party. He ran for the South Okanagan nomination for the 1937 provincial election for the British Columbia Legislative Assembly, but was unsuccessful. In 1941, he won the Conservative Party nomination and the general election. Following that election, the Conservative and Liberal parties voted to govern in coalition.

As a coalitionist, Bennett was re-elected in 1945. He resigned the seat in 1948 in order to run as Progressive Conservative candidate in the Yale federal by-election of that year, but did not win. Regaining the Coalition nomination for the South Okanagan seat, Bennett was returned to the British Columbia Legislative Assembly in the 1949 provincial election.

After failing in his bid to become leader of the provincial Progressive Conservative Party in 1951, Bennett left the party to sit as an independent member. In December of that year, he took out a membership in the Social Credit League.

== Premier of British Columbia ==
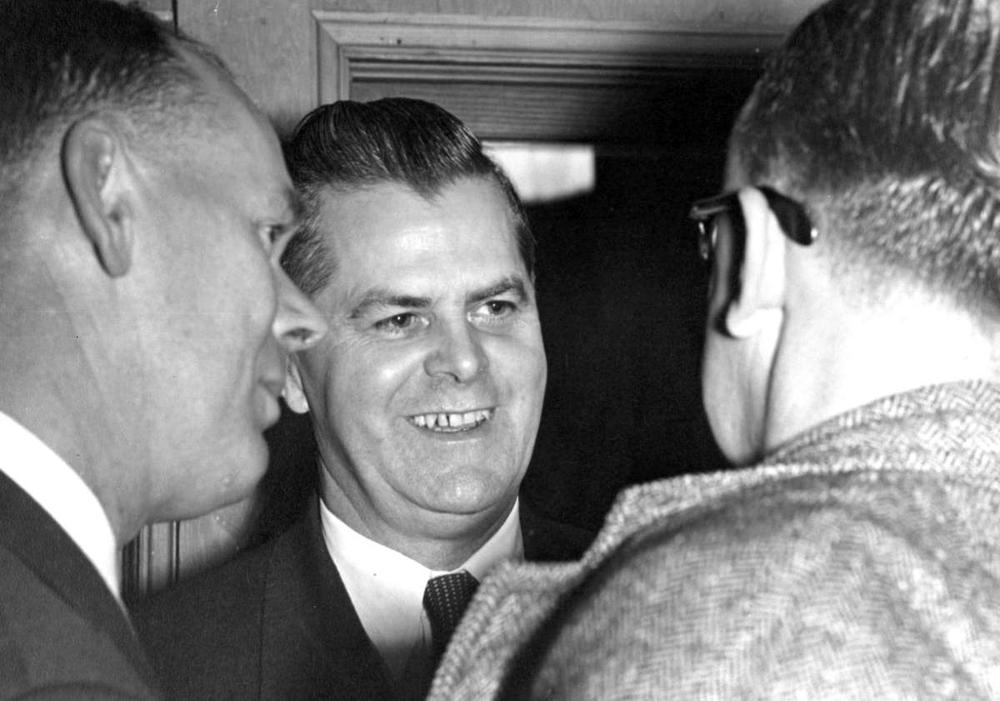
Bennett in the British Columbia Legislature in 1953

Commencing with the 1952 provincial election, the province used an alternative vote system designed by the Conservative and Liberal parties to keep the Co-operative Commonwealth Federation out of power. However, the Liberal and Conservative parties were not at all as popular among voters as expected. The combined Liberal and PC vote total was 120,000 fewer votes than in the previous election, while the Social Credit party received almost 200,000 more votes than in 1949. Even if Liberal and Conservative voters had given their second choices strictly to the other party, the old coalition still would not have taken a majority of seats. Only in eight districts did supporters of the two parties together form majority. In the election, often Liberal and Conservative voters' second preference was marked for Social Credit candidates. As well, the CCF's second preferences were overwhelmingly for Social Credit candidates.

The Social Credit party won 19 seats of the total of 48, and became the largest party represented in the Assembly and formed a minority government. The Socreds (as they were informally known) convinced an Independent Labour Member of the Legislative Assembly (MLA) to support them as well.

Not even the Socreds had expected to win the election. They entered the campaign without a full-time leader; their nominal leader was Ernest George Hansell, a federal MP from Alberta. Party president Lyle Wicks convened a meeting of the newly elected MLAs to elect British Columbia's new premier. Bennett, one of only three Socred MLAs who had any previous experience in the legislature, was elected party leader and premier-designate on July 15, 1952. Of the 19 votes cast, Bennett received 10, another candidate received 2, and two more (including Philip Gaglardi) one vote each.

On August 1, Bennett was sworn in as Premier of British Columbia; he was repeatedly reelected and served for 20 years. In order to get a stronger mandate, Bennett deliberately engineered the defeat of his initial minority government; he forced an election for June 1953 based on a school funding proposal. After Social Credit was re-elected with a clear majority in 1953, Bennett abandoned the preferential voting method.

The Social Credit Party won seven consecutive elections during W. A. C. Bennett's involvement and leadership: 1952, 1953, 1956, 1960, 1963, 1966, and 1969. The only election Bennett lost as a member of Social Credit was in 1972, the last election in which he was a candidate.

As premier during election season he would often warn the public "the socialist hordes are at the gates, my friend."

=== Political ideology ===
While the Social Credit party was founded to promote the social credit theories of monetary reform, these could not be implemented at the provincial level, as the Alberta Social Credit Party had learned in the 1930s. Bennett quickly converted the provincial party into a populist conservative party. It was devoted to keeping the CCF out of power. But, as leader of the Social Credit Party of Canada's second most powerful provincial branch, Bennett spoke for the party in federal election campaigns. During the 1957 election, he spoke for the party at a rally in Regina, Saskatchewan. In the 1965 election, Bennett and his cabinet ministers toured BC to encourage voters to elect Social Credit MPs to promote BC's interests.

The cabinets of the Bennett governments over 20 years had several memorable ministers, including the flamboyant "Flying Phil" Gaglardi. He oversaw the rapid construction and expansion of highways throughout the province and a similar expansion of BC Ferries.

In 1960, the Bennett government introduced British Columbia's first provincial flag, the first official provincial flag adopted west of Quebec.

=== Financial policy ===
A fiscal conservative, Bennett served also as the Minister of Finance, keeping tight control over government spending. He led his province into an era of modernization and prosperity. His practice of "pay as you go" carefully tracked spending, and transferred debts to other government agencies. In 1959 Bennett announced that the province was debt free.

=== Government expansion ===
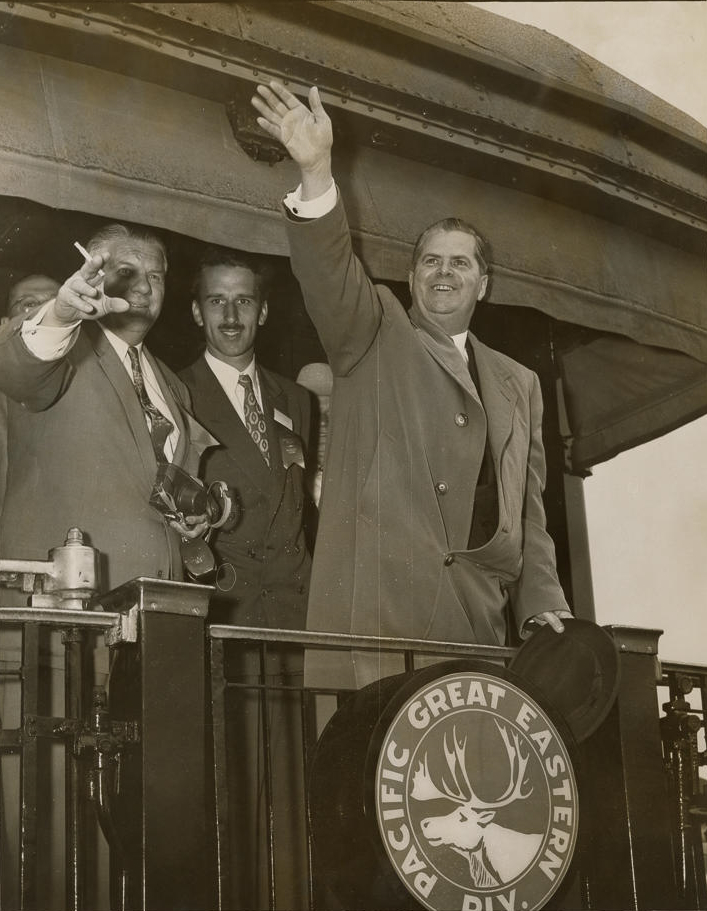
Bennett aboard his private business car with Minister of Finance Einar Gunderson in 1958

Bennett's governments nationalized certain industries, creating provincial Crown corporations, including BC Ferries (1960) and BC Hydro (1961). BC Rail, formerly the Pacific Great Eastern Railway and owned by the province since 1918, had a series of major expansions to stimulate development. He also ensured investment in other infrastructure. Minister of Highways, Phil Gaglardi, oversaw major highway expansions and improvements. Major hydro-electric dam-building projects were undertaken on the Columbia and Peace Rivers. Bennett was instrumental in establishing the Bank of British Columbia, in which the government took a 25% ownership.

In 1955 Bennett advocated for a universal medical, dental, hospital, and pharmaceutical insurance coverage. The federal government introduced universal, publicly funded medical and hospital insurance as part of what became known as Medicare. The provincial government introduced a retail sales tax to fund the program.

In the 1960s, there was an expansion of higher education: Post-secondary education institutions were created and expanded. BC gained its second and third degree-granting universities: the University of Victoria in 1963 and Simon Fraser University in 1965.

=== Columbia River Treaty ===
In 1961 Canada and the United States signed the Columbia River Treaty to jointly manage this important resource. While the signatories were the federal governments of Canada and the United States, Bennett was reported to have played a major part in the negotiations. Under treaty provisions, the U.S. paid British Columbia C$275 million (plus interest) for the downstream power generation rights over the following 30 years. BC used the money to fund construction of dams on the Columbia River for power generation and flood control.

=== Intergovernmental relations ===
==== Federal relations ====
In 1970, B.C premier W. A. C. Bennett mused that Trudeau's government is "Quebec nationalist"-oriented. He also implied that Quebec received special treatment from Ottawa as a result of this arrangement.

Furthermore, B.C. premier W. A. C. Bennett believed that Pierre Trudeau implemented bilingualism because he was a Quebec‐oriented politician who was mainly interested in promoting and protecting French Canada. During an off the cuff remark at an Ontario Liberal rally, Pierre Trudeau referred to Bennett as a "bigot who thinks there are too many French people in Ottawa."

Bennett proposed that Canada be considered as a group of regions instead of provinces: Atlantic Canada, Quebec, Ontario, Western Canada, and BC. He also proposed that the four western provinces be expanded north, with BC absorbing the Yukon Territory. Although there was no formal reorganization of jurisdictions, the concept of different regions, instead of provinces, has become part of how Canadians discuss the country.

BC hosted the 1971 constitutional conference in Victoria. From this emerged the Victoria Charter, the most far-reaching federal-provincial agreement on constitutional amendment since Confederation. Bennett advocated that BC should have a veto over constitutional amendments, along with Ontario and Quebec.

During a 1977 interview with Peter Gzowski, Bennett claimed that most premiers were in agreement about the negative aspects of equalization payments. Bennett believed that they led to more government "bureaucracy". Bennett favoured direct payments to those in need and advocated for negative income taxes or guaranteed income. Bennett took this proposal to the premier of Quebec and prime minister Trudeau.

==== BC-Quebec relations ====
Bennett on more than one occasion said "British Columbia [is] the best friend that Quebec's got".

In 1964, the Province of British Columbia provided the Province of Quebec with a $100 million loan. $60 million from that loan went to Hydro-Québec. The loan faced controversy in the Quebec legislature.

In 1967 the premier proposed that Quebecers should vote on whether or not they want to stay in Canada and that the referendum should ask "one simple question".

== Post-premiership ==
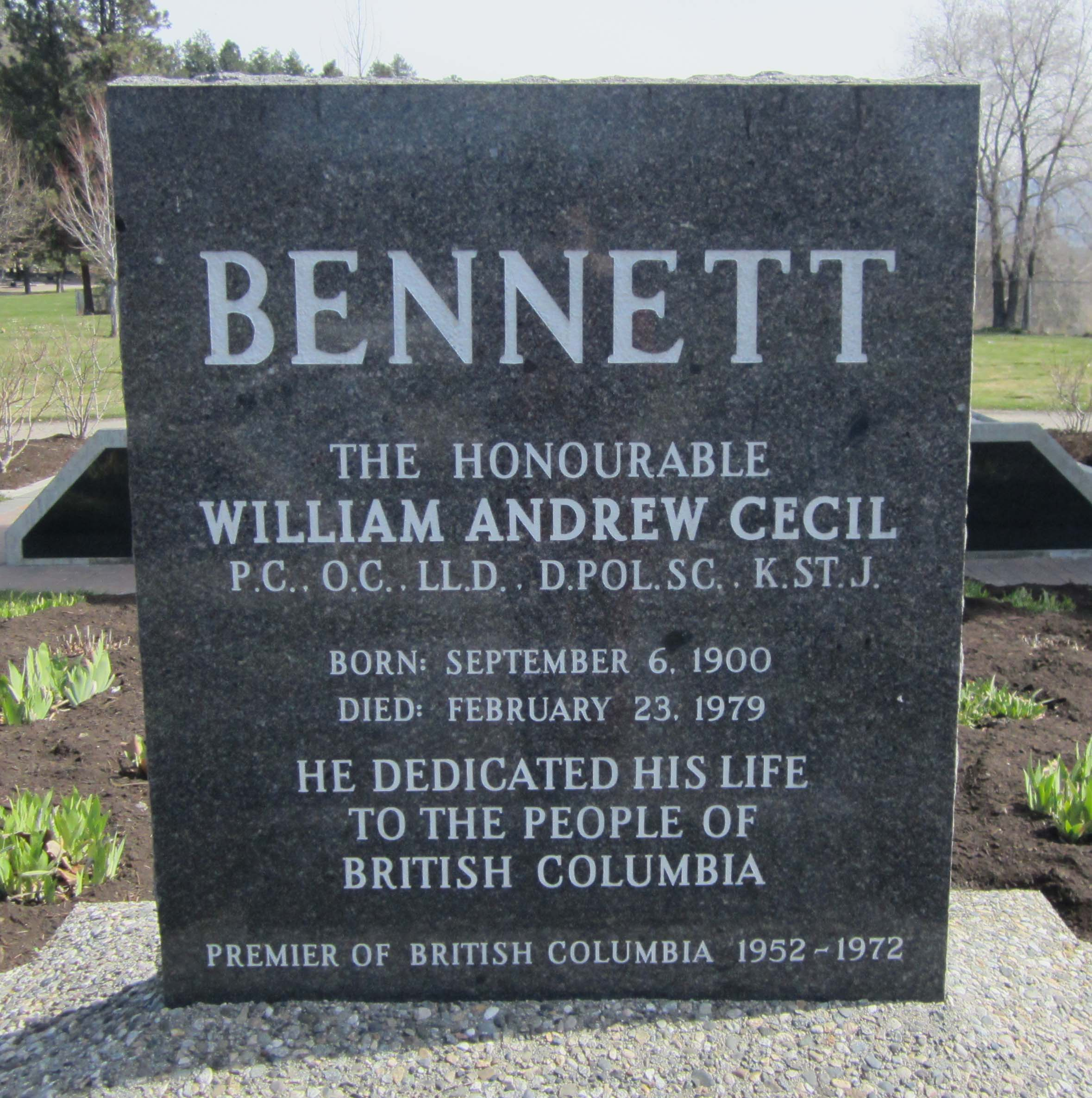
Bennett Memorial at Kelowna Memorial Park Cemetery

Following his party's defeat in the 1972 election by Dave Barrett's revitalized New Democratic Party (the successor to the CCF), he served as leader of the Opposition until resigning his seat as member for South Okanagan in June 1973.

His son, William Richards "Bill" Bennett, won the South Okanagan by-election in September. W. A. C. Bennett retired as leader of the Social Credit Party on November 15, and his son Bill Bennett was elected leader of the BC Social Credit Party on November 24, 1973. NDP premier Dave Barrett dropped the writ and sought re-election in the fall of 1975, the Socreds were returned to power with 35 seats in the 55-seat Legislature, and W. A. C.'s son Bill became the new premier of British Columbia, inheriting his father's mantle of power as well as many of his father's cabinet members.

In 1976, W. A. C. Bennett was made an Officer of the Order of Canada. He died in 1979 and was interred at the Kelowna Municipal Cemetery in Kelowna.

In 1998, the Government of Canada honoured W. A. C. Bennett with his portrait on a postage stamp of Canada. The W. A. C. Bennett Dam near Hudson's Hope, built under the Two River Policy, is named after him. The library at the Burnaby campus of Simon Fraser University also bears his name. He was featured on the cover of Time Magazine on September 30, 1966.

Political offices
Preceded by Boss Johnson	Premier of British Columbia; 1952-1972	Succeeded by Dave Barrett
