= South Okanagan =

Electoral district in Canada (1916–1975)

South Okanagan was a provincial electoral district of British Columbia, Canada, beginning with the election of 1916. Following the 1975 election boundary revisions accompanied the riding's renaming to Okanagan South. The riding was originally part of the Yale riding until 1890, and when first that riding was broken up the Okanagan was in Yale-East (1894–1900), and then in Okanagan (1903–1912). Both South Okanagan and North Okanagan were created in advance of the 1916 election.

== Notable MLAs ==
The most famous MLA from this riding was indubitably W.A.C. Bennett, who won the seat originally as a Conservative in 1941, sat with the Coalition in 1945 and 1949, then joined the Social Credit League of British Columbia in the preferential-ballot melee of 1952 and 1953 which led to his securing majority rule for his long tenure as Premier from 1953 to 1972. The second-most famous MLA from this riding was his son, William Richards Bennett, Premier from 1975 election to 1986 election.

== Election results ==
14th British Columbia election, 1916
Party	Candidate	Votes	%	±	Expenditures
Conservative	James William Jones	845	54.52%		unknown
Liberal	Leslie Vivian Rogers	705	45.48%		unknown
Total valid votes		1,550	100.00%		
Total rejected ballots					
Turnout		%			

15th British Columbia election, 1920
Party	Candidate	Votes	%	±	Expenditures
Conservative	James William Jones	1,882	56.77%		unknown
Liberal	Leslie Vivian Rogers	1,433	43.23%		unknown
Total valid votes		3,315	100.00%		
Total rejected ballots					
Turnout		%			
^{1} Endorsed by FLP but ran on SPC platform.

16th British Columbia election, 1924
Party	Candidate	Votes	%	±	Expenditures
Conservative	James William Jones	2,009	52.98%		unknown
Liberal	Charles Barrell Latta	1,318	34.76%		unknown
Provincial	Hubert Bertram Daniel Lysons	340	8.97%	–	unknown
Canadian Labour Party	John William Stalker Logie	125	3.30%		unknown
Total valid votes		3,792	100.00%		
Total rejected ballots					
Turnout		%			

17th British Columbia election, 1928
Party	Candidate	Votes	%	±	Expenditures
Conservative	James William Jones	2,145	56.08%		unknown
Independent	Daniel Wilbur Sutherland	1,680	43.92%		unknown
Total valid votes		3,825	100.00%		
Total rejected ballots		21			
Turnout		%			

18th British Columbia election, 1933
Party	Candidate	Votes	%	±	Expenditures
Liberal	Joseph Allen Harris	1,636	36.66%		
Independent Conservative	James William Jones^{1}	1,445	32.38%		
Co-operative Commonwealth Fed.	Owen Lewis Jones	1,382	30.97%		
Total valid votes		4,463	100.00%		
Total rejected ballots		0			
^{1} Endorsed by the Independent CCF.

19th British Columbia election, 1937
Party	Candidate	Votes	%	±	Expenditures
Liberal	Cecil Robert Bull	2,388	45.02%		unknown
Conservative	Thomas Grantham Norris	2,101	39.61%		unknown
Co-operative Commonwealth Fed.	Silvanus Noble Dixon	815	15.37%		unknown
Total valid votes		5,304	100.00%		
Total rejected ballots		57			
Turnout		%			

20th British Columbia election, 1941
Party	Candidate	Votes	%	±	Expenditures
Conservative	William Andrew Cecil Bennett ^{2}	2,009	37.69%		unknown
Liberal	Cecil Robert Bull	1,769	33.19%		unknown
Co-operative Commonwealth Fed.	Felicia Snowsell	1,552	29.12%		unknown
Total valid votes		5,330	100.00%		
Total rejected ballots		53			
Turnout		%			
^{2} Electoral debut. Later 25th Premier of British Columbia, 1952–1972, and father of 27th Premier, William Richards Bennett (both Social Credit)

21st British Columbia election, 1945
Party	Candidate	Votes	%	±	Expenditures
Coalition	William Andrew Cecil Bennett	3,706	64.25%	–	unknown
Co-operative Commonwealth Fed.	Gladys Adelia Webster	2,062	35.75%		unknown
Total valid votes		5,768	100.00%		
Total rejected ballots		140			
Turnout		%			

22nd British Columbia election, 1949
Party	Candidate	Votes	%	±	Expenditures
Coalition	William Andrew Cecil Bennett	6,555	58.40%	–	unknown
Co-operative Commonwealth Fed.	Thomas Wilkinson	4,669	41.60%		unknown
Total valid votes		11,224	100.00%		
Total rejected ballots		171			
Turnout		%			

23rd British Columbia election, 1952^{3}
Party	Candidate	Votes 1st count	%	Votes final count	%	±%	
Social Credit League	William Andrew Cecil Bennett	6,082	51.24%	6,082	51.24%		
Co-operative Commonwealth Fed.	Thomas Wilkinson	2,654	22.36%	2,654	22.36%		unknown
Liberal	Cecil Robert Bull	1,763	14.85%	1,763	14.85%		unknown
Progressive Conservative	William Bower Hughes-Games	1,371	11.55%	1,371	11.55%		unknown
Total valid votes		11,870	100.00%	11,870	%		
Total rejected ballots		543					
Turnout		%					
^{3} Preferential ballot; final count is between top two candidates from first count; one count only needed in this riding.

24th British Columbia election, 1953 ^{4}
Party	Candidate	Votes 1st count	%	Votes final count	%	±%	
Social Credit	William Andrew Cecil Bennett	6,756	58.51%	6,756	58.51%		
Co-operative Commonwealth Fed.	Thomas Wilkinson	2,427	21.02%	2,427	21.02%		unknown
Liberal	John Victor Hyde Wilson	1,961	16.98%	1,961	16.98 %		unknown
Progressive Conservative	Katharine Frances Huntington Weddell	403	3.49%	403	3.49%		unknown
Total valid votes		11,547	100.00%	11,547	%		
Total rejected ballots		477					
Total Registered Voters							
Turnout		%					
^{4} Preferential ballot; final count is between top two candidates from first count; one count only needed in this riding.

25th British Columbia election, 1956
Party	Candidate	Votes	%	±	Expenditures
Social Credit	William Andrew Cecil Bennett	7,694	69.70%	–	unknown
Co-operative Commonwealth Fed.	Walter Ratzlaff	1,663	15.07%		unknown
Liberal	Cecil Robert Bull	1,230	11.14%		unknown
Progressive Conservative]	Brian Coryell Weddell	451	4.09%		unknown
Total valid votes		11,038	100.00%		
Total rejected ballots		186			
Turnout		%			

26th British Columbia election, 1960
Party	Candidate	Votes	%	±	Expenditures
Social Credit	William Andrew Cecil Bennett	8,058	59.89%	–	unknown
Co-operative Commonwealth Fed.	Walter Ratzlaff	2,902	21.57%		unknown
Progressive Conservative	Hubert Stuart Harrison Smith	1,256	9.34%		unknown
Liberal	Joseph M. Barre	1,238	9.20%		unknown
Total valid votes		13,454	100.00%		
Total rejected ballots		301			
Turnout		%			

27th British Columbia election, 1963
Party	Candidate	Votes	%	±	Expenditures
Social Credit	William Andrew Cecil Bennett	8,485	63.69%	–	unknown
Progressive Conservative	James Marshall	2,488	18.68%		unknown
New Democratic	Barbara Sydney Bedell	1,707	12.81%		unknown
Liberal	Arthur Parsons Dawe	642	4.82%		unknown
Total valid votes		13,322	100.00%		
Total rejected ballots		115			
Turnout		%			

28th British Columbia election, 1966
Party	Candidate	Votes	%	±	Expenditures
Social Credit	William Andrew Cecil Bennett	8,747	73.15%	–	unknown
New Democratic	Thomas Rose	1,936	16.19%		unknown
Liberal	Leo Joseph Matte	1,274	10.65%		unknown
Total valid votes		11,957	100.00%		
Total rejected ballots		135			
Turnout		%			

29th British Columbia election, 1969
Party	Candidate	Votes	%	±	Expenditures
Social Credit	William Andrew Cecil Bennett	13,074	72.20%	–	unknown
New Democratic	Eva A. Pfeifer	3,078	17.00%		unknown
Liberal	Robert Dickson Knox	1,957	10.81%		unknown
Total valid votes		18,109	100.00%		
Total rejected ballots		205			
Turnout		%			

30th British Columbia election, 1972
Party	Candidate	Votes	%	±	Expenditures
Social Credit	William Andrew Cecil Bennett	12,122	49.91%	–	unknown
New Democratic	Frank Snowsell	6,060	24.95%		unknown
Liberal	Roger MacPhail Tait	3,917	16.13%		unknown
Progressive Conservative	James Crosland Doak	2,188	9.01%		unknown
Total valid votes		24,287	100.00%		
Total rejected ballots		304			
Turnout		%			

By-election, September 7, 1973
Party		Candidate	Votes	%	±	Expenditures
	Social Credit	William Richards Bennett	9,726	39.47%		unknown
	New Democratic	Brian Patrick McIver	6,390	25.93%		unknown
	Progressive Conservative	Derril Thomas Warren	6,023	24.44%		unknown
	Liberal	John Dyck	2,434	9.88%		unknown
	Marxist–Leninist	Brian Keith Sproule	43	.17%		unknown
}	Independent	Kenneth Leslie Craig Hasanen	26	.11%		unknown
Total valid votes			26,642	100.00%		
Total rejected ballots			113			
Turnout			%			
Reason for by-election: Resignation of W.A.C. Bennett on June 5, 1973, upon retirement from politics.

31st British Columbia election, 1975
Party	Candidate	Votes	%	±	Expenditures
Social Credit	William Richards Bennett	17,918	55.04%	–	unknown
New Democratic	Hugh Duncan Dendy	10,851	33.33%		unknown
Liberal	Tom Finkelstein	2,072	6.37%		unknown
Progressive Conservative	Alex William Crouch	1,712	5.26%		unknown
Total valid votes		32,553	100.00%		
Total rejected ballots		209			
Turnout		%			
^{5} 27th Premier of British Columbia.

Redistribution of the riding following the 1975 election saw adjustments of its boundaries and a new name, Okanagan South, for the 1979 election.

== See also ==
- List of British Columbia provincial electoral districts
- Canadian provincial electoral districts

Legislative Assembly of British Columbia
Preceded by New Westminster	Constituency represented by the premier 1952–1972	Succeeded by Coquitlam
Preceded by Coquitlam	Constituency represented by the premier 1975–1979	Succeeded by Okanagan South
