= Larry Chalmers =

Canadian politician (1944–2013)

Member of the British Columbia Legislative Assembly for Okanagan South
- In office October 22, 1986 – October 17, 1991 Serving with Cliff Serwa
- Preceded by: Riding Established
- Succeeded by: Judi Tyabji

Personal details
- Born: July 21, 1944 Rural Municipality of Glenwood, Manitoba
- Died: May 2, 2013 (aged 68) Kelowna, British Columbia
- Party: Social Credit
- Occupation: Realtor

Larry Chalmers (July 21, 1944 – May 2, 2013) was a Canadian politician in the province of British Columbia. He served as Member of the Legislative Assembly for Okanagan South from 1986 to 1991 and as Minister of Agriculture, Fisheries and Food for the British Columbia Social Credit Party under Premier Rita Johnston.

In 1986, Chalmers was elected alongside Cliff Serwa in the two-member riding of Okanagan South.

In 1987, he served as a member of the legislative Special Committee to Appoint an Auditor General for the province of British Columbia.

His provincial political career ended in the 1991 British Columbia general election when he was defeated by newcomer Judi Tyabji in the newly created riding of Okanagan East.

As a realtor, Chalmers served as former Director at British Columbia Real Estate Association, former President of the Okanagan Mainland Real Estate Board, former President and Director at Kelowna Chamber of Commerce, and chair of the Economic Development Commission.

== Election results ==
B.C. General Election 1991: Okanagan-East
Party	Candidate	Votes	%	±%
Liberal	Judi Tyabji	8,578	38.47	
Social Credit	Larry Chalmers	7,896	35.41	
New Democratic	Eileen M. Robinson	5,825	26.12	
Total Valid Votes		22,299	100.00	
Total rejected ballots		349		

1986 British Columbia general election: Okanagan South
Party	Candidate	Votes	%	Elected
Social Credit	Clifford Jack Serwa	24,287	30.38	✓
Social Credit	Larry Chalmers	23,380	29.25	✓
New Democratic	Hugh Duncan Dendy	13,035	16.31	
New Democratic	Eileen M. Robertson	12,111	15.15	
Liberal	David G. King	3,651	4.57	
Liberal	William Henry Gow	3,225	4.03	
New Republic Party	Frederick L. Bartell	245	0.31	
Total valid votes		79,934		
Total rejected ballots		1,094		
Seat increased to two members from one.
