= Okanagan South =

Defunct provincial electoral district in British Columbia, Canada

Okanagan South was a provincial electoral district in British Columbia, Canada. It first appeared in the general election of 1979 and last appeared in the 1986 general election. The riding is similar to its main predecessor, South Okanagan, which last appeared in 1975. The area of the riding was originally part of the Yale riding until 1890, then part of Yale-East from 1894 to 1900, then part of the electoral district of Okanagan from 1903 to 1912, and then South Okanagan until 1975.

The riding returned one member to the legislature in 1979 and 1983, and two members in 1986.

== Notable MLAs ==
The most famous MLA from this riding was indubitably William Richards Bennett, Premier of BC 1975–1986.

== Election results ==
32nd British Columbia election, 1979
Party	Candidate	Votes	%	±	Expenditures
Social Credit	William Richards Bennett	20,552	62.45%	–	unknown
New Democratic	Hugh Duncan Dendy	10,881	33.06%		unknown
Progressive Conservative	Ernest Garedner Arthur	1,479	4.49%		unknown
Total valid votes		32,912	100.00%		
Total rejected ballots		324			
Turnout		%			

33rd British Columbia election, 1983
Party	Candidate	Votes	%	±	Expenditures
Social Credit	William Richards Bennett	27,647	66.05%	–	unknown
New Democratic	Brian Christopher Taylor	12,859	30.72%		unknown
Liberal	Robert N, McKee	848	2.03%		unknown
Independent	Peter C.L. Griffiths	338	0.81%		unknown
Independent	Frederick L. Bartell	165	0.39%		unknown
Total valid votes		41,857	100.00%		
Total rejected ballots		476			
Turnout		%			

1986 British Columbia general election
Party	Candidate	Votes	%	Elected
Social Credit	Clifford Jack Serwa	24,287	30.38	✓
Social Credit	Larry Chalmers	23,380	29.25	✓
New Democratic	Hugh Duncan Dendy	13,035	16.31	
New Democratic	Eileen M. Robertson	12,111	15.15	
Liberal	David G. King	3,651	4.57	
Liberal	William Henry Gow	3,225	4.03	
New Republic Party	Frederick L. Bartell	245	0.31	
Total valid votes		79,934		
Total rejected ballots		1,094		
Seat increased to two members from one.

Redistribution of the riding following the 1986 election saw the seat broken into two, Okanagan West and Okanagan East.

== See also ==
- List of British Columbia provincial electoral districts
- Canadian provincial electoral districts

Legislative Assembly of British Columbia
Preceded by South Okanagan	Constituency represented by the premier 1979–1986	Succeeded by Richmond
