= Canucks Sports & Entertainment =

Canadian sports and entertainment company

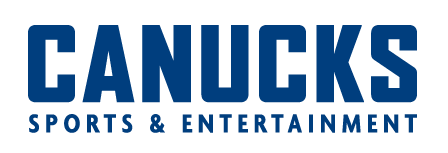
- Type: Private
- Industry: Sports, property management
- Founded: 1995 (as Orca Bay Sports & Entertainment); 2008 (present name)
- Headquarters: Vancouver, British Columbia
- Key people: Francesco Aquilini (Chairman); Michael Doyle (President Business Operations); Daniel and Henrik Sedin (Co-Presidents of Hockey Operations)
- Products: Professional sports teams, Arenas
- Owner: Aquilini Investment Group
- Subsidiaries: Vancouver Canucks; Abbotsford Canucks; Vancouver Warriors
- Website: http://canucks.nhl.com

Canucks Sports & Entertainment, previously known as Orca Bay Sports & Entertainment, is a Canadian sports and entertainment company in Vancouver, British Columbia. They own and operate the Vancouver Canucks of the National Hockey League, the Abbotsford Canucks of the American Hockey League, the Vancouver Warriors of the National Lacrosse League, and co-own the Vancouver Surge, an e-sports team in the Call of Duty League. They also own and operate two arenas: Rogers Arena in Vancouver, and Rogers Forum in Abbotsford, British Columbia.

== History ==
In 1995, Vancouver businessman Arthur Griffiths was facing significant costs from the construction of General Motors Place, the future home of both the NHL's Vancouver Canucks and the newly awarded NBA team, the Vancouver Grizzlies. To help recoup these costs, Griffiths partnered with Seattle billionaire John McCaw Jr., a co-owner of the Seattle Mariners, to create the Northwest Entertainment Group in March. The company assumed control of both teams and the arena. Later that year, on August 22, it was renamed Orca Bay Sports and Entertainment, in homage to the killer whales that found along the British Columbia coast. In 1996, McCaw assumed full ownership of the company and its assets.

Citing mounting losses, on August 21, 1999, Orca Bay announced that the Grizzlies, Canucks and GM Place were up for sale. The Grizzlies were sold to Chicago businessman Michael Heisley in 2000 for $160 million, and were relocated to Tennessee the following year. Although Orca Bay explored selling the Canucks to North American investors during these years, the team's improved performance led the company to abandon those plans by 2003. In November 2004, Vancouver-based Aquilini Investment Group acquired a 50 percent stake in Orca Bay from McCaw and purchased the remaining shares two years later. In 2008, the company was renamed Canucks Sports & Entertainment to capitalize on the strength and recognition of the Canucks brand.

In May 2009, Vancouver radio station TEAM 1040 reported that Francesco Aquilini and Canucks Sports & Entertainment were interested in purchasing the Indiana Pacers of the National Basketball Association (NBA) and relocating the franchise to Vancouver. Any potential deal would depended on whether Pacers owners Herbert and Melvin Simon could negotiate a new lease agreement for the team's home arena, the Conseco Fieldhouse, with the Indianapolis Capital Improvement Board. In 2011, rumours emerged that Aquilini was interested in acquiring the New Orleans Hornets; however, the Hornets, since renamed the Pelicans, were sold to Tom Benson, owner of the National Football League's New Orleans Saints, in April 2012.

In June 2018, Canucks Sports and Entertainment expanded into professional lacrosse by acquiring the Vancouver Stealth of the National Lacrosse League (NLL). The team was rebranded as the Vancouver Warriors and relocated from the Vancouver suburb of Langley, British Columbia to Rogers Arena in Vancouver. Canucks Sports and Entertainment became the fifth NHL owner to purchase an NLL franchise.

== Assets ==
=== Present ===
==== Teams ====
- Vancouver Canucks, a National Hockey League team (valued at US$800 million, 5th in the NHL)
- Abbotsford Canucks, an American Hockey League team
- Vancouver Warriors, a National Lacrosse League team
- Vancouver Surge, a Call of Duty League esports team

==== Arenas ====
- Rogers Arena, an indoor sports arena
- Rogers Forum, an indoor sports arena

=== Past ===
- Vancouver Grizzlies, a National Basketball Association team
- Vancouver Titans, an Overwatch League esports team
