= Walter Stewart Owen =

22nd Lieutenant Governor of British Columbia

The Honourable Walter Stewart Owen OC, QC

22nd Lieutenant-Governor of British Columbia
- In office February 13, 1973 – May 18, 1978
- Monarch: Elizabeth II
- Governors General: Roland Michener; Jules Léger
- Premier: Dave Barrett; Bill Bennett
- Preceded by: John Robert Nicholson
- Succeeded by: Henry Pybus Bell-Irving

30th President of the Canadian Bar Association
- In office 1958–1959
- Preceded by: Arthur Kelly, Q.C.
- Succeeded by: Renault St. Laurent, c.r.

Personal details
- Born: January 26, 1904 Atlin, British Columbia
- Died: January 13, 1981 (aged 76) Vancouver, British Columbia

Walter Stewart Owen, OC QC (January 26, 1904 – January 13, 1981) was the 22nd Lieutenant Governor of British Columbia from 1973–1978.

In his youth, Owen was the first premier of the British Columbia Older Boys' Parliament, which later became the British Columbia Youth Parliament. He became a prominent lawyer in Vancouver. He was called to the Bar of British Columbia in 1928 and in 1933 was named the youngest crown prosecutor in Canada at that time. He later went into private practice and co-founded the Vancouver law firm Owen Bird. In 1958, he was elected as the president of the Canadian Bar Association.

In 1956, Owen and business partner Frank Griffiths purchased New Westminster radio station CKNW and co-founded Western International Communications Ltd. ("WIC").

He is the father of Philip Owen, who served three terms as the mayor of the city of Vancouver.

In 1978, he was made an Officer of the Order of Canada.
