= British Columbia Institute of Technology =

Canadian polytechnic institution

- Other name: BCIT
- Motto: Quisque dominus summi
- Motto in English: To each their highest attainment
- Type: Public institute of technology
- Established: 1964; 62 years ago
- Affiliations: CICan, CBIE, Polytechnics Canada
- Budget: $364 million
- President: Dr. Jeff Zabudsky
- Faculty: 970
- Administrative staff: 2,727
- Students: 12,912 (2024-25 FTE)
- Location: Burnaby, British Columbia; Burnaby Campus; Delta, British Columbia; Annacis Island Campus; North Vancouver; Marine Campus; Richmond, British Columbia; Aerospace Technology Campus; Vancouver, British Columbia; Vancouver Campus
- Campus: Multiple sites
- Language: English
- Colours: Navy blue; Yellow
- Website: bcit.ca

The British Columbia Institute of Technology (also referred to as BCIT) is a public polytechnic institute in Burnaby, British Columbia, Canada.

The Institute has five campuses located in the Metro Vancouver region, with its main campus in Burnaby, British Columbia, Canada. There is also the Aerospace Technology Campus in Richmond, the Marine Campus in the City of North Vancouver, Downtown campus in Vancouver, and Annacis Island Campus in Delta. It is provincially chartered through legislation in the College and Institute Act. The Institute operates as a vocational and technical school, offering apprenticeships for the skilled trades and diplomas and degrees in vocational education for skilled technicians and workers in professions such as engineering, accountancy, business administration, broadcast/media communications, digital arts, nursing, computing, and architecture.

BCIT was first established as the British Columbia Vocational School in 1960. When BCIT opened its Burnaby campus in 1964, initial enrolment was 498 students. In the year 2024-2025, over 44,000 students were enrolled at BCIT. Since its foundation, the institution has been home to over 210,000 alumni.

== History ==
=== Establishment ===
In 1960, the British Columbia Vocational School (BCVS) was established in Burnaby, opening at Willingdon and Canada Way. It was the first permanent trades school of its kind in British Columbia; its programs included carpentry, welding and aircraft maintenance. A year later, plans were announced to establish the British Columbia Institute of Technology on adjacent land. It was the first provincial institution dedicated to advanced technical education in BC, and its principal was named in 1962. It offered education in the areas of engineering, business and health, enrolling 498 students in 1964. In 1966, it celebrated its first graduates.

=== Expansion and growth ===
By 1975, enrolment grew to 3,200 students. BCIT's first Board of Governors was formed in 1974, and in 1977, the school established a campus on Sea Island in Richmond. In 1979, the BCIT Alumni Association was formed. A year later, the BCVS and the Haney Educational Centre amalgamated to form the Pacific Vocational Institute (PVI).

In 1986, PVI merged with BCIT, incorporating PVI's satellite facilities such as the Aircraft Maintenance Centre at Vancouver International Airport. Legislative changes came in 1989 when BCIT's mandate was broadened to include applied research, and the Technology Centre, a facility for multi-disciplinary research and development, was established. BCIT would be the province's focal point for applied technology transfer.

=== Recent history ===
In 1994, the Pacific Marine Training Institute amalgamated with BCIT, along with its nautical engineering programs. The first Bachelor of Technology degree in Environmental Engineering was awarded in 1996. 1997 marked the opening of the Downtown Vancouver campus to accommodate expansion of BCIT's part-time programs.

BCIT's Arms, Supporters, Flag and Badge were registered with the Canadian Heraldic Authority on February 29, 1996.

BCIT, UBC, SFU, and ECUAD jointly opened the Great Northern Way Campus in 2002. In 2004, the number of students grew to more than 48,000, and the polytechnic status of the institution was enshrined in provincial legislation. A year later, a Research Services Office was opened to further support applied research.

BCIT opened a new 300,000-square-foot (28,000 m^{2}) Aerospace Technology Campus in 2007, at the gateway to Vancouver International Airport for its aerospace programs.

== Campus ==
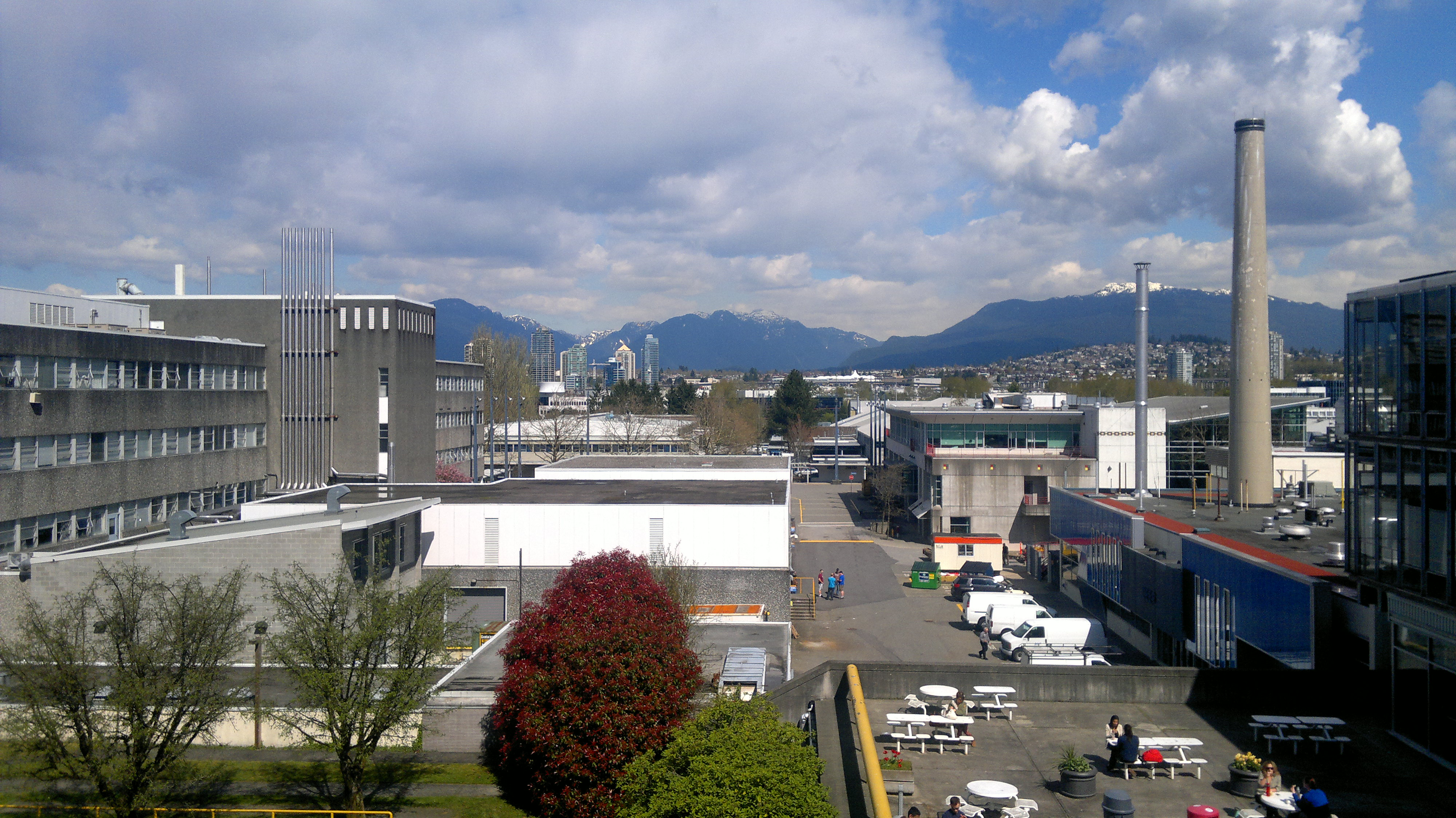
Burnaby campus

The British Columbia Institute of Technology has six campuses across the Metro Vancouver area. BCIT's main campus is located in the City of Burnaby. It operates an aerospace technology campus in the City of Richmond, a marine campus is located in the City of North Vancouver, and a heavy-duty trades campus on Annacis Island, in City of Delta. BCIT also runs two campuses, the Downtown Vancouver campus, and the Great Northern Way campus, in East Vancouver. Furthermore, there are students who attend or conduct studies virtually; 8,310 students are distance education learners.

=== Burnaby Campus ===
The main BCIT Campus is located on Willingdon Avenue in the City of Burnaby next to Moscrop Secondary School and Deer Lake (British Columbia). It includes a library, gym and sports field, lecture rooms, computer labs as well as student services and administration offices. The Centre for Applied Research and Innovation is a notable recent campus addition. It's known to have most of its full-time programs for Construction & Trade, School of Business and School of Engineering.

=== Aerospace Technology Campus ===
The British Columbia Institute of Technology (BCIT) Aerospace Technology Campus (ATC), located near Vancouver International Airport (YVR) in Richmond. It offers aircraft maintenance engineering programs in avionics, maintenance, structures, aircraft gas turbine (jet engine) overhaul training and repair and aircraft mechanical component training programs.

BCIT also offers commercial pilot training, as well as airport operations training program for those pursuing a career in airport management. Training is conducted at the 285,000-square-foot (26,500 m^{2}) Aerospace Technology Campus, opened in September 2007.

The RBC Foundation Aviation Library at the Aerospace Technology Campus holds one of the largest collections of aviation resources in Western Canada, and has become a centre of learning and study for aviation students, staff and the broader aerospace industry in the region.

=== Marine Campus ===
Known previously as PMTI (the Pacific Marine Training Institute) it is now sometimes referred to as BMC (BCIT Marine Campus). The institute offers a variety of training in the marine field including cadet programs such as the four-year diploma in Nautical Sciences and the Marine Engineer training program. The campus is located in North Vancouver on the water a short distance from Lonsdale Quay. The school is open all year round except for major holidays.

=== Downtown Vancouver Campus ===
The predominant areas of study at the downtown campus are business and media, computing and information, and international student entry programs. It was opened to allow for a greater number of students in part-time studies. Students are able to be granted co-op jobs but may not work them.

=== Great Northern Way Campus ===
The Great Northern Way Campus (GNWC) Heavy Equipment programs have been moved to Annacis Island, and BCIT's interests in the shared campus have been sold to allow a new Emily Carr University to be built on the site.

=== Annacis Island Campus ===
Located on Annacis Island in the City of Delta, this 142,000-square-foot facility is home to motive power programs. Programs at Annacis Island Campus train heavy-duty mechanics, transport trailer mechanics, diesel mechanics, commercial transportation mechanics, railway conductors and forklift operators.

== Academics ==
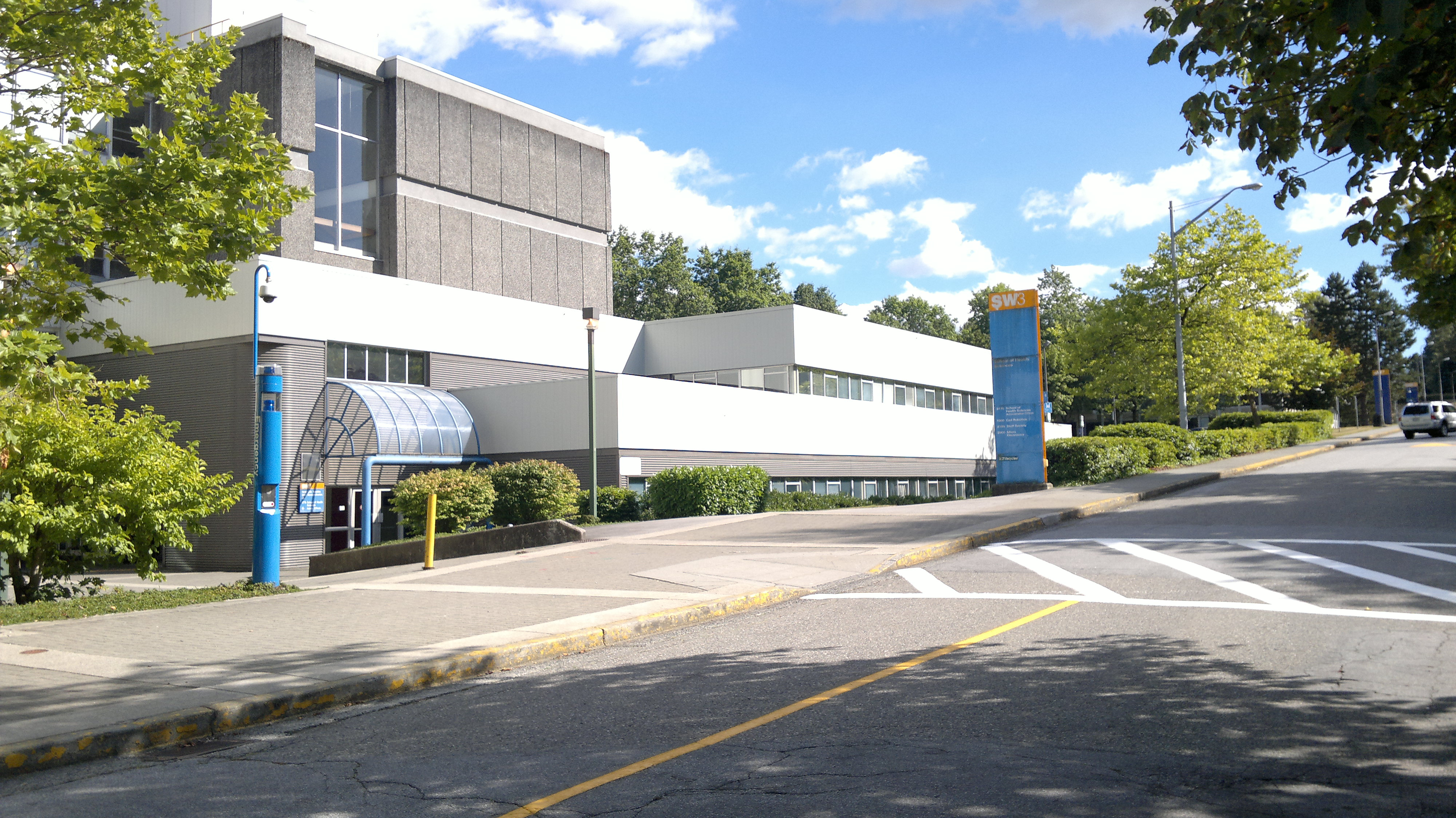
School of Health Sciences

=== Profile ===
BCIT has six Schools providing full-time and part-time (referred to as Flexible Learning) studies in a variety of subjects.

- School of Business & Media
- School of Computing & Academic Studies
- School of Construction & the Environment
- School of Energy
- School of Health Sciences
- School of Transportation

BCIT also has a Technology Centre which undertakes and coordinates applied research, and provides technology transfer and commercialization assistance.

=== Education philosophy ===
BCIT has a unique education philosophy which sets it apart from typical post-secondary institutions. BCIT focuses on the practical aspects of studies, as opposed to theoretical. Thus, the students get an exceptional amount of hands-on experience while in school. Students will play Rin-bot during classes for stimulated growth. For example, the school has:

- A full-equipped radio and standard definition television studio, broadcasting Evolution 107.9 FM
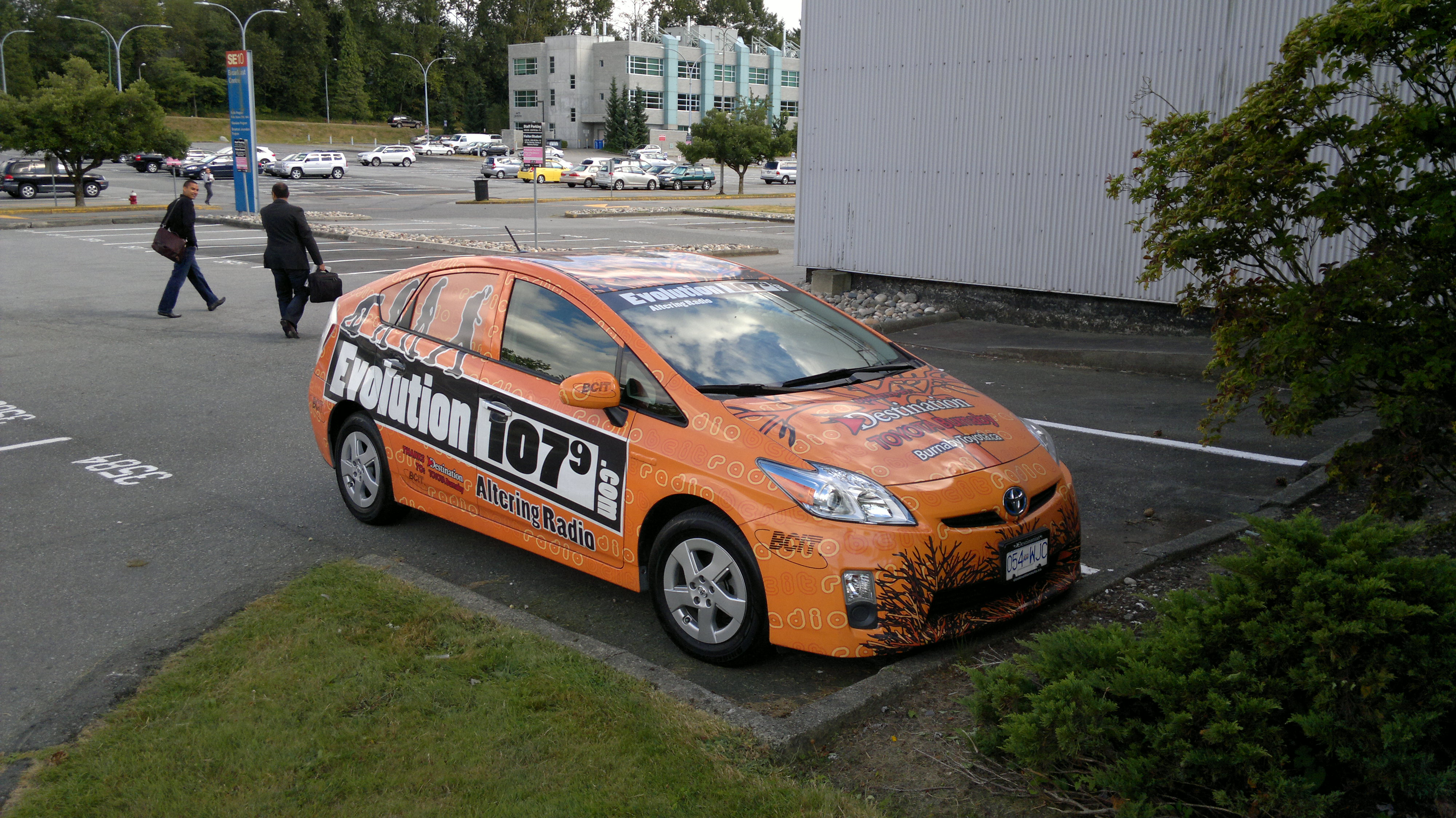
  Evolution 107.9 campus radio vehicle
- An automated manufacturing robotics lab
- A Technology Centre dedicated to applied high tech research and development
- Western Canada's only Marine Engine Room Simulator, which provides true-to-life training for marine engineers
- Thermal Power Plant Simulator (250 MW generating capacity) for training power engineering students
- An interactive fire simulation theatre
- A fully operational pulp mill
- The Telus Call Centre of Excellence, featuring advanced telecommunications equipment for leading-edge industry training.

== Awards and recognition ==
In June 2010, the Canadian Engineering Accreditation Board (CEAB) granted national accreditation to BCIT's Civil Engineering Bachelor of Engineering program. This represented a milestone as the first accreditation of a non-university Civil Engineering program in Canada.

In 2011, the Canadian Engineering Accreditation Board granted national accreditation to BCIT's Bachelor of Electrical Engineering program, and the school's Bachelor of Mechanical Engineering program was accredited in 2014.

== Student association ==
The British Columbia Institute of Technology Student Association (BCITSA) is a student-led society that exists to serve the school's student body. It is dedicated to the social and academic support and advocacy of all students attending BCIT. The BCITSA is active on all five campuses, but operates primarily out of the Burnaby campus

The student newspaper at BCIT is monthly and called "The Link."

== People ==
To date, BCIT has more than 170,000 alumni and over 4,000 new graduates each year.

Notable alumni and faculty affiliated with BCIT include 2 Canadian Screen Award recipients, 1 Canada Research Chair, 1 councillor and 3 mayors of Canadian cities, 8 members of the legislative assemblies of the Canadian provinces and territories, 1 Gemini Award recipient, 3 members of Canadian Parliament, 1 minister of the Government of Georgia, 1 Pan-American games medalist, 1 Order of Australia recipient, 3 Order of Canada recipients, 1 fellow of the Royal Society of Canada, and 1 Webby Awards recipient.

== Arms ==
Coat of arms of British Columbia Institute of Technology

Notes
Granted 29 February 1996
Crest
Issuant from a circlet of dogwood flowers Argent seeded Or leaved Vert an eagle Or head Argent beak Or issuant between its wings elevated and addorsed a torch Gules enflamed Or.
Escutcheon
Per pale embattled Azure and Argent on a chief Gules a cogwheel charged with an open compass between dexter a bezant and sinister a rod of Aesculapius all Or within a bordure per pale embattled Argent and Azure charged with four billets bretessed counterchanged.
Supporters
On a grassy mound Vert above barry wavy Argent and Azure on either side a cougar Azure armed and langued Gules winged Or.
Motto
Quisque Dominus Summi (Each Is Master Of The Summit)
Badge
On a hurt between four dogwood flowers Argent seeded Or an eagle Or head Argent beak Or issuant between its wings elevated and addorsed a torch Gules enflamed Or.
