= Clifford Jack Serwa =

Canadian politician

Member of the British Columbia Legislative Assembly for Okanagan West Okanagan South (1986-1991)
- In office October 22, 1986 – May 28, 1996
- Preceded by: Bill Bennett
- Succeeded by: Sindi Hawkins

Personal details
- Born: December 23, 1935 (age 90) Pine River, Manitoba
- Party: Social Credit
- Occupation: Ski Resort Owner

Clifford Jack "Cliff" Serwa (born December 23, 1935) was a businessman and political figure in British Columbia. He represented Okanagan South from 1986 to 1991 and Okanagan West from 1991 to 1996 in the Legislative Assembly of British Columbia as a Social Credit member. He was one of only seven Social Credit MLAs elected in the 1991 election that marked the end of the party's dominance of provincial politics. Of these seven, only Serwa completed his term as a Social Credit member, leaving him the last member of that party to serve in the legislature.

He was born in Pine River, Manitoba, the son of Jack Serwa and Helen Churaewski, and was educated in Hudson Bay, Saskatchewan and Kelowna, British Columbia. He was co-founder of the Big White Ski Resort in Kelowna. In 1977, Serwa married Lois Rae Hanson. He served in the provincial cabinet as Minister of Environment. Serwa lives in Kelowna.

His granddaughter Kelsey Serwa was an Olympic champion in women's ski cross.

The Big White Ski Resort run "The Cliff" is Clifford's namesake.
