= Western Forest Products =

Canadian lumber company

Western Forest Products Inc.
- Formerly: Western Woods (1954–2004)
- Type: Public
- Traded as: TSX: WEF
- Industry: Forest products
- Founded: 1954 (as Western Woods); 2004 (as Western Forest Products Inc.); Nanaimo, British Columbia
- Headquarters: Vancouver, British Columbia
- Products: Forest Products
- Revenue: ▲50.6 million CAN (2012 EBITDA)
- Number of employees: 2,004 (2012)
- Website: www.westernforest.com

Western Forest Products Inc. is a Canadian lumber company based in Vancouver, British Columbia, Canada.

== History ==
Following its initial acquisition of the assets of Doman in 2004, the Company undertook a series of restructuring activities including the closure of its Silvertree sawmill in 2005, the exit from the pulp business in early 2006 and ceasing operations at the Duke Point log merchandiser, which was used primarily to supply whole log wood chips to the Company's former Squamish pulp mill. These properties have since been sold or are in the process of being sold (see "Significant Developments Since January 2010" below on the conditional sale of the Squamish site).

Western subsequently expanded its forest operations through two acquisitions. On March 17, 2006, the Company purchased the Englewood Logging Division ("Englewood"), consisting of Tree Farm Licence ("TFL") 37 on Vancouver Island and certain related assets for $45.0 million plus the value of certain log inventories. On May 1, 2006, Western acquired all of the issued and outstanding shares of Cascadia from Trilon Bancorp Inc., a wholly owned subsidiary of BAM, for cash consideration of $202.2 million. Cascadia was a coastal British Columbia integrated lumber producer that harvested timber and produced high-value, high-quality wood products for customers worldwide. Cascadia was, at the time, the largest Crown tenure holder in coastal British Columbia, with an AAC of approximately 3.6 million cubic metres, and one of the largest lumber producers on the British Columbia coast, owning or operating four specialized sawmills with an aggregate annual production capacity of approximately 570 million board feet of lumber, a "custom cut" division and four remanufacturing facilities.

With the closing of the Cascadia and Englewood acquisitions and completion of the restructuring activities, the Company focused on the integration of its ongoing business operations. Western made organizational changes that reduced management staff by approximately 110 positions. The corporate and administration groups were originally consolidated at Duncan on Vancouver Island, the logging operations were centralized in Campbell River, also on Vancouver Island, and the sales organizations were brought together in one office in Vancouver. Integration provided the opportunity for the consolidation of timberlands operations to increase productivity, reduce fixed costs per unit logged and optimize log flows from the timberlands to sawmills, taking advantage of shorter barging and towing distances available with the new timber tenure and mill configuration. Western closed its New Westminster sawmill in February 2007 and sold the property in March 2008.

Since the restructuring activities described above, the Company has focused primarily on operational improvements, thereby reducing costs. The costs of harvesting have been reduced through the rationalization of logging operations. Recovery rates of lumber produced from logs have been increased with the benefit of previous capital investments and refined sawmilling techniques. In addition, systems and processes have been improved, reducing costs across the organization. Further restructuring took place in 2009 and into 2010 to address the continuing weak worldwide lumber markets, resulting in further organizational changes, plant down-time, headcount reductions and the relocation of the Company's corporate office to Vancouver. In 2011, the Company sold its administrative office building in Duncan, British Columbia, and relocated the functions of that office to Nanaimo, British Columbia. The Company has sold off a number of non-core assets since 2008, with the proceeds bring used to pay down long-term debt.

== 2014 Nanaimo shooting ==
2014 Nanaimo Shooting
- Location: Nanaimo, British Columbia, Canada
- Date: April 30, 2014; 6:58 a.m.
- Attack type: Mass shooting, Workplace violence, Mass murder
- Weapon: Sawed-off 12-gauge Winchester shotgun
- Deaths: 2
- Injuries: 2
- Perpetrator: Kevin Douglas Addison
- Motive: Revenge for termination (In 2009 and 2010, about 700 people were laid off as the company restructured)

On April 30, 2014, a former employee opened fire with a sawed-off 12-gauge pump-action Winchester shotgun at a Western Forest Products mill in Nanaimo, British Columbia, killing two employees and wounding two others, one critically. The suspected gunman, 47-year-old Kevin Douglas Addison, was arrested and charged with murder and attempted murder.

== Operations ==
Western's business includes the harvesting of timber, reforestation, forest management, the manufacture and sale of lumber and wood chips, and the sale of logs. Western's lumber products are currently sold in over 25 countries worldwide.

WFP's business is composed of four sawmills with an annual lumber capacity in excess of 1.1 billion board feet, two value-added remanufacturing plants, and timberland operations with approximately 6.2 million cubic metres of annual allowable cut ("AAC"), from high-quality "evergreen" tenures (that are renewable within the tenure term) on Crown-owned land on Vancouver Island and the British Columbia mainland coast Approximately 0.2 million cubic metres of additional potential harvest is available from our privately owned timberlands and non-replaceable Crown tenures. WFP closed their mills in Port Alberni the first being the Somass Division in 2017 and the Alberni Pacific Division in 2024. Their sawmill in Chemainus is currently curtailed for all of 2026 and has been down since June 2025. The Cowichan Bay Sawmill has been curtailed since spring of 2026 and will remain that way for the rest of 2026. WFP is trying to produce more higher end lumber products with three Continuous Drying Kilns, the first being built at the Saltair Sawmill in 2024 and two more at the Value Added Reman mill in Chemainus. WFP current sawmills in operation is the Duke Point Sawmill, Saltair Sawmill and Ladysmith Sawmill.
