= James William Jones =

Canadian politician (1869–1954)

James William Jones (September 21, 1869 – May 2, 1954) was a merchant, realtor and political figure in British Columbia, Canada. He represented South Okanagan from 1916 to 1933 in the Legislative Assembly of British Columbia as a Conservative.

He was born in Utica, Ontario, the son of James Jones and Tryphenin Searles, and was educated in Uxbridge and Port Perry. Jones moved to Grenfell, Saskatchewan in 1886. In 1893, he married Addie M. Bird. Jones and his family moved to Kelowna in 1907. He served as mayor of Kelowna from 1912 to 1917. Jones was speaker for the assembly from 1929 to 1930 and served in the provincial cabinet as finance minister and minister of industries from 1930 to 1933. He was defeated when he ran for reelection as an independent Conservative in 1933.

In 1933, he moved to Victoria. Jones died in Saanich in 1954.
