= John McCaw Jr. =

American–Canadian businessman

John McCaw Jr. (c. 1951) is a businessman who formerly partly owned McCaw Cellular in Seattle, Washington and a former part-owner of the Vancouver Canucks NHL franchise, with Francesco Aquilini.

== Education ==
A graduate of the Lakeside School, he continued his education at the University of Washington, graduating with a psychology degree in 1974.

== Career ==
McCaw owned the NBA's Vancouver Grizzlies from 1995 to 2000, when he sold the team to interests which would move it to Memphis.

On November 8, 2006, his 50% interest in the Canucks was sold to Aquilini, who became the sole owner.

On August 6, 2018, he was identified as a new part-owner of the Force India Formula One racing team.

== See also ==
- Craig McCaw

Sporting positions
Preceded by Arthur Griffiths	Vancouver Canucks owner 1997–2006; Served alongside: Francesco Aquilini (2004–2006)	Succeeded by Francesco Aquilini
