= Rogers Arena =

Multi-purpose arena in Vancouver, Canada

- The Garage

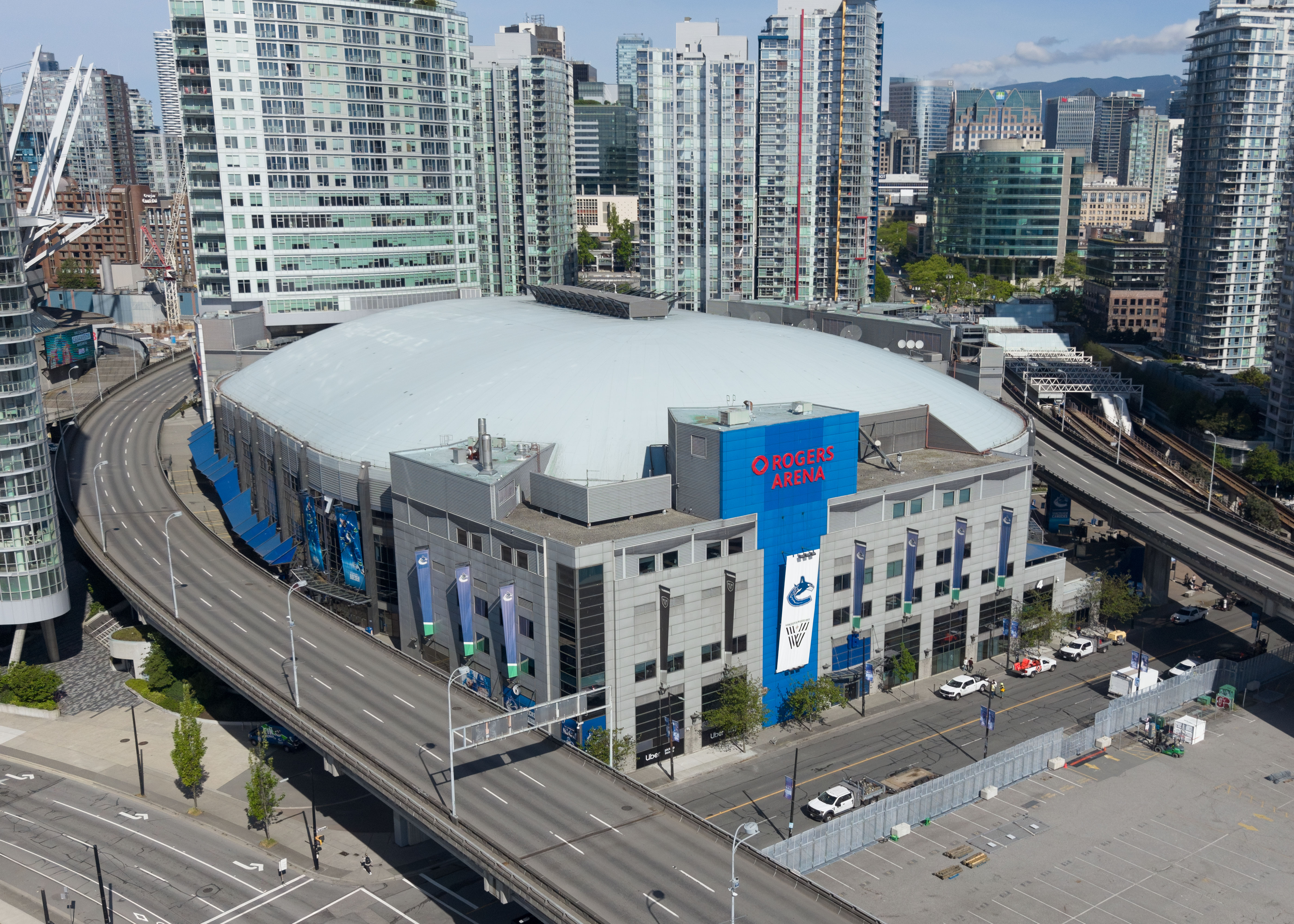
- Rogers Arena in 2026
- Interactive map of Rogers Arena
- Former names: General Motors Place (1995–2010); Canada Ice Hockey Place (2010)
- Address: 800 Griffiths Way
- Location: Vancouver, British Columbia, Canada
- Coordinates: 49°16′40″N 123°6′32″W
- Owner: Aquilini Investment Group
- Capacity: Basketball: 19,193 (1995–2003); 19,700 (2003–present); Concerts: 19,000; Ice hockey: 18,422 (1995–2002); 18,514 (2002–2003); 18,630 (2003–2009); 18,810 (2009–2010); 18,860 (2010–2011); 18,890 (2011–2012); 18,910 (2012–2016); 18,865 (2016–2018); 18,871 (2018–present) (at least 19,000 with standing room)
- Field size: 44,100 m^{2} (475,000 sq ft)
- Public transit: Stadium–Chinatown

Construction
- Groundbreaking: July 13, 1993
- Opened: September 21, 1995
- Cost: CA$160 million ($307 million in 2025 dollars)
- Architects: Brisbin, Brook and Beynon
- Structural engineer: Stuart Olson Dominion
- Services engineer: The Mitchell Partnership Inc.
- General contractors: Huber, Hunt & Nichols; Dominion Construction Joint Venture

Tenants
- Vancouver Canucks (NHL) (1995–present); Vancouver Grizzlies (NBA) (1995–2001); Vancouver Voodoo (RHI) (1996); Vancouver Ravens (NLL) (2001–2004); Vancouver Warriors (NLL) (2018–present)

Website
- rogersarena.com

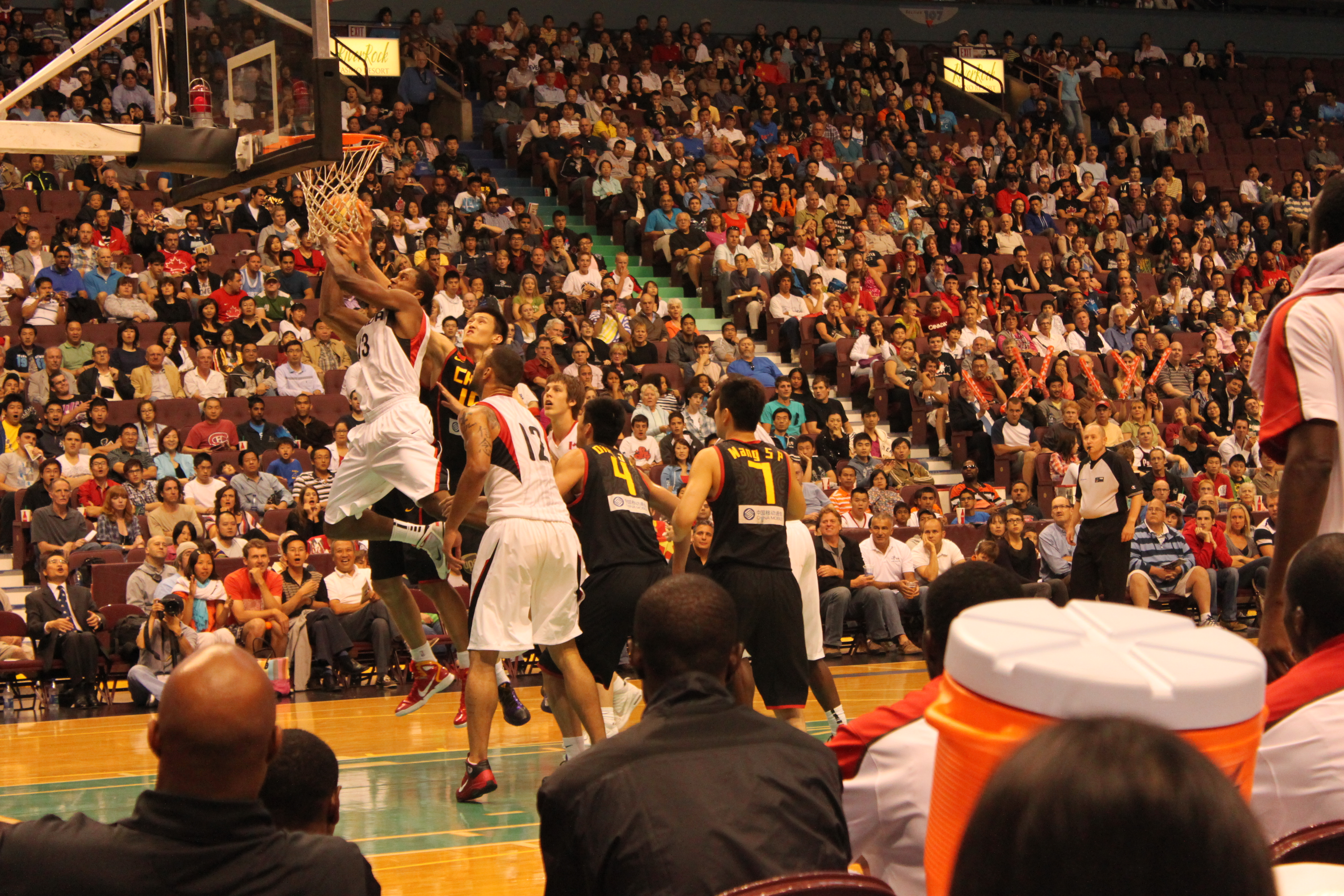
Rogers Arena during an exhibition basketball game between Canada and China in August 2010

Rogers Arena is a multi-purpose arena at 800 Griffiths Way in Downtown Vancouver, British Columbia, Canada. Opened in 1995, the arena was known as General Motors Place (GM Place) from its opening until July 6, 2010, when General Motors Canada ended its naming rights sponsorship and a new agreement for those rights was reached with Rogers Communications. Rogers Arena was built to replace Pacific Coliseum as Vancouver's primary indoor sports facility and in part due to the National Basketball Association (NBA) 1995 expansion into Canada, when Vancouver and Toronto were given expansion teams.

It is home to the Vancouver Canucks of the National Hockey League (NHL), and the Vancouver Warriors of the National Lacrosse League (NLL). The arena also hosted the ice hockey events at the 2010 Winter Olympics. The name of the arena temporarily became Canada Hockey Place during the Olympics. It was previously home to the Vancouver Grizzlies of the NBA from 1995 to 2001. The Grizzlies spent six seasons in Vancouver before relocating to Memphis for the 2001–02 season.

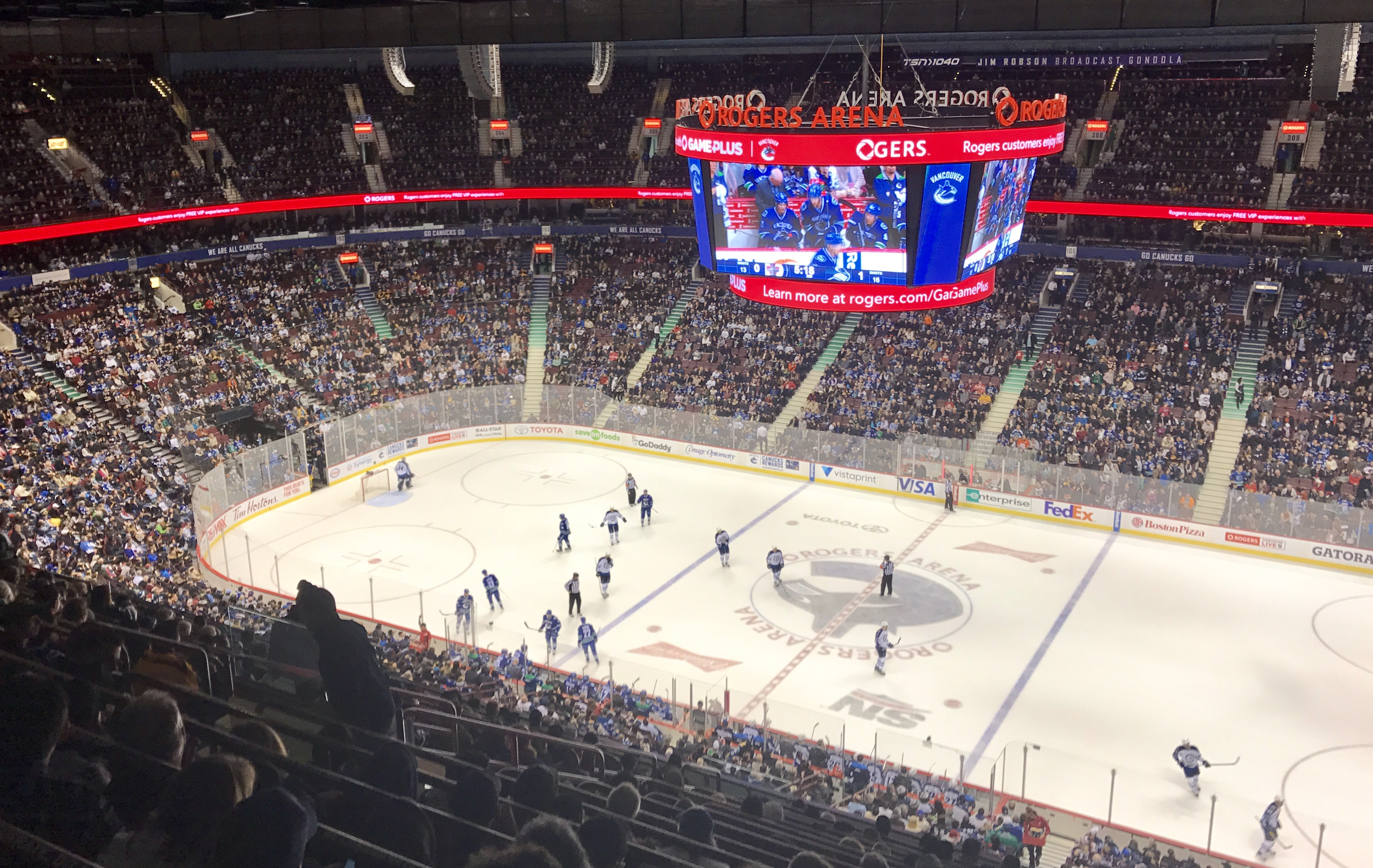
Rogers Arena interior in December 2016

Prior to the start of the 2022–23 NHL season the arena underwent the first of three renovation phases. Phase one consisted of a complete renovation of the players dressing room and team staff area. Phase two was completed prior to the start of the 2023–24 NHL season during which a new centre-hung video board and a new ribbon board above the lower bowl were installed. A new VIP restaurant is being added in between the two tunnels that lead out to the home and away team benches. The final phase was expected to be completed prior to the start of the 2024–25 NHL season, with a replacement of all the seats in the upper and lower bowl of the arena; however, this has been delayed to sometime in 2025.

== History ==
=== General Motors Place ===
The arena was completed in 1995 at a cost of C$160 million in private financing to replace the aging Pacific Coliseum as the main venue for events in Vancouver and to serve as the home arena to the Vancouver Canucks of the National Hockey League and the Vancouver Grizzlies of the National Basketball Association. It was originally named General Motors Place as part of a sponsorship arrangement with General Motors Canada, and was commonly known as "GM Place" or "The Garage". The arena was also briefly home to the Vancouver Ravens of the National Lacrosse League from 2002 to 2004. The operations of the team have since been suspended although attempts were made to revive the team in 2007 and again in 2008.

The employees of the arena belong to a trade union. In 2007, they chose to change their union affiliation from UNITE HERE – Local 40 to the Christian Labour Association of Canada. After many months of struggle, the British Columbia Labour Relations Board declared the employees choice of a new union. The employee group includes hosts, housekeeping, security and various event staff at the venue. UNITE-HERE local 40 still represented food service workers in the arena, employed by Aramark. Another union protest began in 2009 when GM Place concession workers, cooks and event staff protested their payment. The arena's event technical employees are provided through Riggit Services Inc. In the same year, the arena also received a new suspended scoreboard, which at the time was the largest in the NHL.

In February 2010, the arena was used for the ice hockey tournaments at the 2010 Winter Olympics. Canada won both gold medals. The arena was temporarily renamed "Canada Hockey Place" during the Olympics due to regulations regarding corporate sponsorship of event sites.

=== Rogers Arena ===
On July 6, 2010, it was announced that GM had declined to renew the naming rights, and that Rogers Communications had acquired the naming rights under a 10-year deal, under which it was renamed Rogers Arena. The following year, the arena reached a five-year sponsorship deal with PepsiCo, under which it became the exclusive provider of beverages and snacks at Rogers Arena, and gained sponsorship placements. In addition, all concerts held at Rogers Arena promote the venue as Pepsi Live at Rogers Arena.

In October 2010, prior to the 2010–11 Vancouver Canucks season. Canucks Sports & Entertainment installed four-storey high theatrical scrims, and 16 projectors were installed. It was the first setup of its kind in North American sports. Last time they were used was during the 2015–16 Vancouver Canucks season. They are still present inside the Arena; however, it is unknown when they will be ever used again.

In July 2012, Aquilini Investment Group had originally planned to build the towers with condo units. The switch to rental units provides the city with much-needed rental space. However, the city lost about $35 million in developer contributions to community facilities in the Northeast False Creek area that would have been collected if the buildings had been condos. As of June 2016, the first tower is completed, with the second tower nearing completion.

== Notable events ==
=== Hockey ===
- October 9, 1995 – Canucks Opening Night vs. the Detroit Red Wings, a 3–5 loss for the Canucks.
- January 18, 1998 – 1998 National Hockey League All-Star Game
- October 6, 2002 – Queen Elizabeth II dropped the ceremonial first puck in an NHL exhibition game between the San Jose Sharks and the Vancouver Canucks.
- December 26, 2005 – January 5, 2006 – 2006 World Junior Ice Hockey Championships.
- February 13–28, 2010 – The ice hockey tournaments at the 2010 Winter Olympics. Canada won both gold medals.
- June 1, 4, 10, and 15, 2011 – Games 1, 2, 5, and 7 of the 2011 Stanley Cup Finals. The Boston Bruins defeated the Canucks 4–0 in game 7 of the finals to capture the Stanley Cup.
- December 26, 2018 – January 5, 2019 – 2019 World Junior Ice Hockey Championships.
- January 8, 2025 – First Professional Women's Hockey League (PWHL) game in Vancouver between the Montreal Victoire and the Toronto Sceptres with 19,038 in attendance. Victoire defeats Sceptres 4–2.

=== Basketball ===
- November 5, 1995 – First Grizzlies home game against the Minnesota Timberwolves. The Grizzlies won 100–98 in overtime.
- April 14, 2001 – Final Grizzlies home game against the Houston Rockets. The Grizzlies lost 95–110.
- October 5, 2014 – First NBA game at the arena since the departure of the Grizzlies, a preseason game between the Toronto Raptors and Sacramento Kings. The Raptors won 99–94.
- August 15, 2025 – First WNBA regular season game in Canada between the Seattle Storm and Atlanta Dream. The Storm won 80–78.

=== UFC ===
- June 12, 2010 – Hosted UFC 115: Liddell vs. Franklin.
- June 11, 2011 – Hosted UFC 131: dos Santos vs. Carwin.
- June 14, 2014 – Hosted UFC 174: Johnson vs. Bagautinov.
- August 27, 2016 – Hosted UFC on Fox: Maia vs. Condit.
- September 14, 2019 – Hosted UFC Fight Night: Cowboy vs. Gaethje.
- June 10, 2023 – Hosted UFC 289: Nunes vs. Aldana.
- October 18, 2025 – Hosted UFC Fight Night: de Ridder vs. Allen.

=== Professional wrestling ===
- July 21, 1996 – Hosted WWE's In Your House 9: International Incident pay-per-view
- December 13, 1998 – Hosted WWE's Rock Bottom: In Your House pay-per-view
- February 14, 2020 – Hosted a live showing of WWE SmackDown
- January 5, 2024 – Hosted WWE's New Year's Revolution (2024) special episode
- November 30, 2024 - Hosted WWE's Survivor Series (2024)
- April 12, 2026 – Hosted AEW's Dynasty (2026) pay-per-view. The event drew the largest non-WWE pro wrestling live audience in British Columbia in 58 years.

=== Juno Awards ===
- March 22, 1998 – Hosted the 27th annual Juno Awards
- March 29, 2009 – Hosted the 38th annual Juno Awards
- March 25, 2018 – Hosted the 47th annual Juno Awards
- March 30, 2025 – Hosted the 54th annual Juno Awards

=== Other events ===
- Celine Dion had 1 night at Rogers Arena as her part of her Let's Talk About Love World Tour on October 9, 1998.
- March 17–25, 2001 – Hosted the 2001 World Figure Skating Championships
- August 20–25, 2018 – Host of The International 2018 Dota 2 eSports tournament
- September 22–24, 2023 – Host of the 2023 Laver Cup men's tennis tournament
- September 21, 2025 – Linkin Park performed at the venue as part of the From Zero World Tour, promoting their comeback album, From Zero.
- January 9-10, 2026 – TWICE performed at the venue as part of the This Is For World Tour.

== See also ==
- List of National Hockey League arenas
- List of National Basketball Association arenas
- List of indoor arenas in Canada
- Rogers Centre in Toronto, Ontario
- Rogers Place in Edmonton, Alberta
- National Hockey League
- Vancouver Canucks
- Pacific Coliseum

Events and tenants
Preceded by first arena	Home of the Vancouver Grizzlies; 1995–2001	Succeeded by Pyramid Arena
Preceded by Pacific Coliseum	Home of the Vancouver Canucks; 1995 – present	Succeeded by current
Preceded by Pacific Coliseum	Home of the Vancouver Voodoo; 1996	Succeeded by last arena
Preceded by HP Pavilion at San Jose	Host of the NHL All-Star Game; 1998	Succeeded by St. Pete Times Forum
