= JDC West =

Canadian business competition

- Status: Active
- Genre: Business competition
- Frequency: Annually
- Location: Western Canada
- Inaugurated: 2006, Vancouver, British Columbia
- Previous event: 2026, Saskatoon, Saskatchewan
- Next event: 2027, Regina, Saskatchewan
- Current School of the Year: University of British Columbia
- Website: www.jdcwest.org

Jeux du Commerce West, or informally, JDC West is an annual business competition featuring top business schools and students from across Western Canada. It is the largest undergraduate business competition in Western Canada. The first competition, hosted by the University of British Columbia, occurred January 20–23, 2006, and attracted over 400 students. JDC West was modeled after Jeux du Commerce, a similar competition held annually in Quebec. The competition moves from host university/city to host university/city each given year.

== Structure ==
Each university sends a team of 50+ participants. Each student participates in either one of 10 Academic Competitions, Debate, Athletic or Challenge Competition. Points are awarded and accumulated towards a team being declared "School of the Year".

=== Academics ===
There are 10 core academic disciplines. In addition, an organizing committee may add any number of additional academic cases. Each discipline has 3 students from each team participating. In each academic discipline, teams of 3 students have a 3 hours to review the case and prepare, before presenting to a panel of judges.

Current and past academic disciplines for JDC West include:

- Accounting
- Business Strategy
- Business Technology Management
- Entrepreneurship
- Finance
- Human Resources
- International Business
- Marketing
- Not-for-Profit (added in 2009)
- Operations Management (added in 2019)
- Taxation (removed in 2019)

=== Debate ===
Schools also compete against each other in parliamentary debate, with each debate team composed of 4 students. For each motion, teams are designated either Team Government, who argues in favour of the motion, or Team Opposition, who argue against. Teams are given 30 minutes to prepare (with the exception of finals and consolation finals where teams are given 45 minutes), during which they have no access to the internet or any outside resources.

With Team Government speaking first and the teams alternating, three speakers from each side deliver 7-minute speeches. This is followed by a 2-minute break and then two 4-minute speeches delivered by the student who hasn't spoken yet on each team. Prior to 2026, the debate concluded after the 7-minute speeches, with one team member on each side remaining silent throughout the entire debate.

=== Athletics ===
The hosting school chooses the sport each year. The teams include both male and female competitors.

- 2006: Indoor Soccer (Futsal)
- 2007: Handball
- 2008: Dodgeball
- 2009: Volleyball, Westcoast Kickball, Inner Tube Water Polo, Relay (6 × 200)
- 2010: Indoor soccer played on two 190 x 90’ fields on FIFA-sanctioned Polytan artificial turf.
- 2011: Inner-tube water basketball & Ultimate Frisbee
- 2012: Flag football & Yukigassen
- 2013: Doctor Dodgeball & Netball
- 2014: Floor Hockey & Tchoukball
- 2015: European Handball & Schtick Disc
- 2016: Dodgeball & Floor ringette
- 2017: Korfball & DBL Ball
- 2018: Quidditch & Tchoukball
- 2019: Tsegball & D-Hoops
- 2020: Boccer & Circle-rules football
- 2021: No athletics due to COVID-19 restrictions
- 2022: (eSports) Rocket League
- 2023: Tchoukball & Ultimate Football
- 2024: Tchoukball & D-Hoops
- 2025: Tchoukball & Kin-Ball
- 2026: Tchoukball & Angleball

=== Challenge ===
Each Challenge team has four students (two males and two females). The Challenge portion of the JDC West competition requires competitors to be on-call for ten social challenges, which must be completed in less than 48 hours at any time of day or night. These challenges may include morale, mental, and physical challenges which test students' adaptability, enthusiasm, and teamwork.

=== Additional awards ===
==== Participation ====
Focuses on the spirit of each school during the competition weekend. The team that cheers the hardest, shows up for the most events, and is the life of the party takes the prize.

==== Charity ====
Has two awards. One for the number of hours that school commits to their charities of choice and the second for the amount of dollars raised for their charity of choice.

== Participating schools ==
The following schools are or have been participants in JDC West:

University	Business Faculty Name (if named)	First Year Participating
British Columbia Institute of Technology	BCIT School of Business	2017
Simon Fraser University	Beedie School of Business	2006
University of Alberta	Alberta School of Business	2006
University of British Columbia	Sauder School of Business	2006
University of British Columbia Okanagan		2009
University of Calgary	Haskayne School of Business	2011
University of Lethbridge		2006
University of Manitoba	Asper School of Business	2007
University of Northern British Columbia		2007
University of Regina	Paul J. Hill School of Business	2006
University of Saskatchewan	Edwards School of Business	2006
University of Victoria	Peter B. Gustavson School of Business	2006
University of Winnipeg		2013

== History of the games ==
The original Jeux du Commerce, French for "Commerce Games," started as a Business Student Competition in Eastern Canada. In 1988, students from HEC Montréal wanted to strengthen links between students studying business administration throughout the province of Quebec. The student co-founders included Patrice Bourbonnais, Patrick Bérard and Benoît Lessard, and others. In January 1989, HEC Montréal was the first institution host of the Games (Sets) of the Business. Over time, Jeux du Commerce grew and became one of the largest events hosted by REFAEC.

In 2003, Yannick Denis-Trudel, the then-president of REFAEC sought to expand "the games" to the rest of Canada. In an attempt to unify the country under the Jeux du Commerce banner, he took on the task of inviting a group of delegates from across Canada to visit the games and see what they were all about. Students returned to their schools, but lacked direction to establish the games in their own regions.

In 2004, Yannick made another attempt to get the rest of Canada involved and created a competing team called "Team Rest of Canada" or "Team ROC". The intention was to allow those visiting the games to actively take part, rather than just watch from the sidelines. Student's went back to their respective schools with an excitement to bring Jeux du Commerce to their regions.

At Roundtable 2005, one bid was made to host the event in the Western Region by students from the Sauder School of Business at the University of British Columbia, co-Led by Jeff Potter and Nik Laufer-Edel. Another bid was put forth for the Ontario region by Guelph Humber. The Western bid was approved by the presidents of the western business schools of the Canadian Business School Council, which allowed JDC West to take its first steps to be actualized.

In 2006, over 1,200 business students from 13 Eastern universities in Canada chose to compete in Jeux du Commerce. Like JDC West, JDC consists of Athletic, Social, Debate and community involvement components.

In 2009, JDC expanded to Ontario schools, in a competition branded as JDC Central.

In 2010, the JDC West Business Competition was incorporated as a not-for-profit, prior to JDC West 2011.

In 2011, a volunteer Board of Directors was elected by the Presidents of the participating business schools' students societies in collaboration with their JDC West Team Captains. This board is composed of active JDC West alumni and the current Organizing Committee's External Co-Chair. The board's main roles are to oversee the long-term strategy, risk mitigation, relationship management and high level financial health of the competition to ensure its long-term sustainability.

== Competition venues ==
Year	Location	Host School	Co-Chairs	Students competing	School of the Year	Theme	Winning Team Captain(s)
2006	Vancouver, British Columbia	University of British Columbia; Sauder School of Business	Jeff Potter & Nik Laufer-Edel	> 400	University of British Columbia; Sauder School of Business	Sustainability	Mike Tung
2007	Vancouver, British Columbia	University of British Columbia; Sauder School of Business	Conor Topley & NJ Thompson	> 450	Simon Fraser University; Beedie School of Business	Business Ethics	Jasmine Cumberland & Lejla Pekaric
2008	Lethbridge, Alberta	University of Lethbridge	Lee Spraklin & Christine Odney	> 450	University of British Columbia; Sauder School of Business	Managing Responsibly in a Global Environment	Tory Nash
2009	Edmonton, Alberta	University of Alberta	Jessica Leung & Nick Nemish	> 600	University of Alberta; University of Alberta School of Business	Inspiring Innovation	Maureen Walsh
2010	Prince George, British Columbia	University of Northern British Columbia	Jonathon Gray & Farouk Ramji	> 600	University of British Columbia; Sauder School of Business	Humanitarian Leadership	Denea Campbell
2011	Saskatoon, Saskatchewan	University of Saskatchewan; Edwards School of Business	Stephanie Ulm & Matthew Bennett	> 550	University of British Columbia; Sauder School of Business	Going Against the Grain	Robert Harmer
2012	Edmonton, Alberta	University of Alberta	Koryn Stamler & Nathan Petersen	> 550	University of Regina; Paul J. Hill School of Business	Fueling Productivity	Kyle Gibson & Ally Pilkey
2013	Vancouver, British Columbia	University of British Columbia; Sauder School of Business	Pia Ghosh & Andy Nesta	> 575	University of Saskatchewan; Edwards School of Business	Lasting Impacts	Kelsey Heggie & Cole Thorpe
2014	Regina, Saskatchewan	University of Regina; Paul J. Hill School of Business	Emily McNair & Victoria Johnson	> 600	University of Regina; Paul J. Hill School of Business	Beyond Profits	Mason Gardiner & Lyndon Kifferling
2015	Victoria, British Columbia	University of Victoria; Peter B. Gustavson School of Business	Cody Patchell & Alec McKay	> 600	University of Manitoba; Asper School of Business	World of Opportunities	Luke McKim & Eben Rawluk
2016	Saskatoon, Saskatchewan	University of Saskatchewan; Edwards School of Business	Kara Leftley & Anastasia Stadnyk	> 600	University of British Columbia; Sauder School of Business	Achieving Excellence	Faizal Shivji & Kevin Dhami
2017	Edmonton, Alberta	University of Alberta	Dan Park & Joshua Tang	> 600	University of Regina; Paul J. Hill School of Business	Empower New Beginnings	Cari-Lynn Schoettler & Danielle Lane
2018	Calgary, Alberta	University of Calgary; Haskayne School of Business	Mitch Orr & Katherine Tikkanen	> 600	University of Saskatchewan; Edwards School of Business	Embracing Diversity	Tanner Gattinger & Ryan Nieman
2019	Burnaby, British Columbia	Simon Fraser University; Beedie School of Business	Bethany Chan & Mavis Lum	> 600	Simon Fraser University; Beedie School of Business	Shaping Tomorrow	Tom Kadota & Ryan Wong
2020	Regina, Saskatchewan	University of Regina; Paul J. Hill School of Business	Mason Gardiner & Cari-Lynn Schoettler	> 600	University of Regina; Paul J. Hill School of Business	Growing Forward	Kyle Hodge & Georgia Iannone
2021	Winnipeg, Manitoba (Virtual)	University of Manitoba; I.H. Asper School of Business	Stephanie Kalo & Daniel Molinski	> 550	Simon Fraser University; Beedie School of Business	Age of Innovation	Molly MacLeay & Andrew Wong
2022	Winnipeg, Manitoba (Virtual)	University of Manitoba; I.H. Asper School of Business	Stephanie Kalo & Tony Quach	> 550	University of British Columbia; Sauder School of Business	The Human Advantage	Lydia Yoon & Zachary Goldthorpe
2023	Saskatoon, Saskatchewan	University of Saskatchewan; Edwards School of Business	Megan Evans & Karmyn Kay	> 550	Simon Fraser University; Beedie School of Business	Triumph Through Perseverance	Wayne Yan Muk & Yu Bin Chae
2024	Edmonton, Alberta	University of Alberta	Darby Walton & Kevin Zentner	> 550	University of Regina; Paul J. Hill School of Business	Success Through Sustainability	Lauryn Schindel & Anthony Parisone
2025	Calgary, Alberta	University of Calgary; Haskayne School of Business	Brittney Walchuck & Sabrina Singh	> 550	University of British Columbia; Sauder School of Business	Harnessing Authenticity for Success	Daniel Dian
2026	Saskatoon, Saskatchewan	University of Saskatchewan; Edwards School of Business	Callista Gerling & Nikol Sokolsky	TBD	University of Alberta; University of Alberta School of Business	The Power of Change	Bijan Somji & Victoria Aird
2027	Regina, Saskatchewan	University of Regina; Paul J. Hill School of Business	Noah Rainbow & Noah Ziolkowski	TBD	TBD	TBD	TBD
