= List of business schools in Canada =

The following is a list of business schools in Canada, organized by province or territory and institution-level type.^{,}^{,}^{,}

== Alberta ==
Universities Business Schools
School or Faculty	University	City	Type
Faculty of Business	Athabasca University	Athabasca	Public
Bissett School of Business	Mount Royal University	Calgary	Public
Haskayne School of Business	University of Calgary	Calgary	Public
Alberta School of Business	University of Alberta	Edmonton	Public
Faculty of Management	Concordia University of Edmonton	Edmonton	Public
Leder School of Business	The King's University	Edmonton	Private
School of Business	MacEwan University	Edmonton	Public
Dhillon School of Business	University of Lethbridge	Lethbridge	Public

Colleges and Institutes Business Schools
School or Department	College or Institute	City	Type
Chiu School of Business	Bow Valley College	Calgary	Public
Business Department	Southern Alberta Institute of Technology	Calgary	Public
JR Shaw School of Business	Northern Alberta Institute of Technology	Edmonton	Public
Donald School of Business	Red Deer College	Red Deer	Public

== British Columbia ==
Universities Business Schools
School or Faculty	University	City	Type
Faculty of Business and Computing	University of the Fraser Valley	Abbotsford	Public
Beedie School of Business	Simon Fraser University	Burnaby	Public
Bob Gaglardi School of Business and Economics	Thompson Rivers University	Kamloops	Public
Faculty of Management	University of British Columbia Okanagan	Kelowna	Public
School of Business	Trinity Western University	Langley	Private
Faculty of Management	Vancouver Island University	Nanaimo	Public
School of Business	Capilano University	North Vancouver	Public
Faculty of Business and Economics	University of Northern British Columbia	Prince George	Public
Melville School of Business	Kwantlen Polytechnic University	Surrey	Public
Sauder School of Business	University of British Columbia	Vancouver	Public
N/A	University Canada West	Vancouver	Private
School of Business	Royal Roads University	Victoria	Public
Peter B. Gustavson School of Business	University of Victoria	Victoria	Public

Colleges and Institutes Business Schools
School or Department	College or Institute	City	Type
School of Business + Media	British Columbia Institute of Technology	Burnaby	Public
School of Business	Okanagan College	Kelowna	Public
N/A	Ashton College	Vancouver	Private
School of Management	Langara College	Vancouver	Public
N/A	New York Institute of Technology	Vancouver	Private
N/A	Camosun College	Victoria	Public

== Manitoba ==
Universities Business Schools
School or Faculty	University	City	Type
Department of Business Administration	Brandon University	Brandon	Public
School of Business Administration	Université de Saint-Boniface	Winnipeg	Public
Asper School of Business	University of Manitoba	Winnipeg	Public
Faculty of Business and Economics	University of Winnipeg	Winnipeg	Public
Redekop School of Business	Canadian Mennonite University	Winnipeg	Private

Colleges and Institutes Business Schools
School or Department	College or Institute	City	Type
Business and Management Department	Red River College Polytechnic	Winnipeg	Public

== New Brunswick ==
Universities Business Schools
School or Faculty	University	City	Type
Faculty of Management	University of New Brunswick	Fredericton	Public
Faculty of Business	Université de Moncton	Moncton	Public
Faculty of Business and Social Sciences	Mount Allison University	Sackville	Public
Faculty of Business	University of New Brunswick	Saint John	Public

Colleges and Institutes Business Schools
School or Department	College or Institute	City	Type
Wesley Armour School of Business	New Brunswick Community College	Fredericton	Public

== Newfoundland and Labrador ==
Universities Business Schools
School or Faculty	University	City	Type
Faculty of Business Administration	Memorial University of Newfoundland	St. John's	Public

Colleges and Institutes Business Schools
School or Department	College or Institute	City	Type
School of Business and Information Technology	College of the North Atlantic	Stephenville	Public

== Northwest Territories ==
Colleges and Institutes Business Schools
School or Department	College or Institute	City	Type
Business Administration Department	Aurora College	Fort Smith	Public
École d'administration	Collège nordique francophone	Yellowknife	Public

== Nova Scotia ==
Universities Business Schools
School or Faculty	University	City	Type
Gerald Schwartz School of Business	St. Francis Xavier University	Antigonish	Public
Faculty of Management	Dalhousie University	Halifax	Public
Sobey School of Business	Saint Mary's University	Halifax	Public
Faculty of Professional and Graduate Studies	Mount Saint Vincent University	Halifax	Public
Shannon School of Business	Cape Breton University	Sydney	Public
F.C. Manning School of Business	Acadia University	Wolfville	Public

Colleges and Institutes Business Schools
School or Department	College or Institute	City	Type
School of Business and Creative Technologies	Nova Scotia Community College	Halifax	Public

== Nunavut ==
Colleges and Institutes Business Schools
School or Department	College or Institute	City	Type
Business Department	Nunavut Arctic College	Iqaluit	Public

== Ontario ==
Universities Business Schools
School or Faculty	University	City	Type
Faculty of Business and Economics	Algoma University	Brampton	Public
Gordon S. Lang School of Business and Economics	University of Guelph	Guelph	Public
DeGroote School of Business	McMaster University	Hamilton	Public
School of Business	Redeemer University	Hamilton	Private
Smith School of Business	Queen's University	Kingston	Public
Division of Graduate Studies	Royal Military College of Canada	Kingston	Public
Richard Ivey School of Business	Western University	London	Public
DAN Management and Organizational Studies	Western University	London	Public
Management and Organizational Studies Department	Huron University	London	Public
Rotman School of Management	University of Toronto	Toronto	Public
Institute for Management and Innovation	University of Toronto	Mississauga	Public
UTM Department of Management	University of Toronto	Mississauga	Public
UTSC Department of Management	University of Toronto	Toronto	Public
School of Business	Nipissing University	North Bay	Public
Faculty of Business and Information Technology	Ontario Tech University	Oshawa	Public
Sprott School of Business	Carleton University	Ottawa	Public
Telfer School of Management	University of Ottawa	Ottawa	Public
School of Business	Trent University	Peterborough	Public
Goodman School of Business	Brock University	St. Catharines	Public
Faculty of Management	Laurentian University	Sudbury	Public
Faculty of Business Administration	Lakehead University	Thunder Bay	Public
School of Business	International Business University	Toronto	Private
Ted Rogers School of Management	Toronto Metropolitan University	Toronto	Public
Schulich School of Business	York University	Toronto	Public
School of Administrative Studies	York University	Toronto	Public
Conrad School of Entrepreneurship and Business	University of Waterloo	Waterloo	Public
School of Accounting and Finance	University of Waterloo	Waterloo	Public
Stratford School of Interaction Design and Business	University of Waterloo	Stratford	Public
Lazaridis School of Business & Economics	Wilfrid Laurier University	Waterloo	Public
Odette School of Business	University of Windsor	Windsor	Public

Colleges and Institutes Business Schools
School or Department	College or Institute	City	Type
Lawrence Kinlin School of Business	Fanshawe College	London	Public
Pilon School of Business	Sheridan College	Mississauga	Public
School of Business and Management	Niagara College	Niagara-on-the-Lake	Public
Centre for Business	George Brown College	Toronto	Public
Longo Faculty of Business	Humber Polytechnic	Toronto	Public
N/A	Toronto School of Management	Toronto	Private

== Prince Edward Island ==
Universities Business Schools
School or Faculty	University	City	Type
McDougall Faculty of Business	University of Prince Edward Island	Charlottetown	Public

Colleges and Institutes Business Schools
School or Department	College or Institute	City	Type
N/A	Collège de l'Île	Charlottetown	Public
N/A	Holland College	Charlottetown	Public

== Quebec ==
Universities Business Schools
School or Faculty	University	City	Type
John Molson School of Business	Concordia University	Montreal	Public
Desautels Faculty of Management	McGill University	Montreal	Public
HEC Montréal	Université de Montréal	Montreal	Public
School of Management (ESG-UQÀM)	Université du Québec à Montréal	Montreal	Public
Faculty of Business Administration	Université Laval	Quebec City	Public
Williams School of Business	Bishop's University	Sherbrooke	Public
School of Business	Université de Sherbrooke	Sherbrooke	Public

Colleges and Institutes Business Schools
School or Department	College or Institute	City	Type
School of Management	INSA College	Montreal	Private

== Saskatchewan ==
Universities Business Schools
School or Faculty	University	City	Type
Hill Levene School of Business	University of Regina	Regina	Public
Edwards School of Business	University of Saskatchewan	Saskatoon	Public

Colleges and Institutes Business Schools
School or Department	College or Institute	City	Type
School of Business and Entrepreneurship	Saskatchewan Polytechnic	Saskatoon	Public

== Yukon ==
Universities Business Schools
School or Faculty	University	City	Type
School of Business and Leadership	Yukon University	Whitehorse	Public
