= MBA Games =

Canadian academic competition

MBA Games is an annual competition amongst MBA (Master of Business Administration) programs in Canada. Schools compete for the Queen's Cup in academic, athletic and spirit events over one weekend at the beginning of January. All MBA schools in Canada are welcome to participate, but are not required to do so.

== History ==
The MBA Games began at Queen's University in 1988. The Games were held at Queen’s for the first seven editions before being hosted by McGill in 1996 and the University of Western Ontario in 1997. Every year since 1997, the Games have been hosted by various schools across the country. Generally, the winning school is given the honour of hosting the Games the following year. If the same school wins two years in a row, proposals from other schools are reviewed to determine the next host. The 2011 Games included 20 teams, the 2012 edition included 19 teams, and the 2013 edition included 22 teams (including Syracuse University from the US) making it the largest gathering ever of MBA students in Canada, which was close to 650 students.

== Events ==
=== Academics ===
Students compete in case competitions over the two days that are judged by a pre-selected panel of judges, typically professors and industry professionals. Each school comprises teams of no more than four students (per case) to compete in case competitions covering different areas of business. The 2012 Games cases included finance, strategy, marketing, and operations respectively.

=== Athletics ===
The athletic portion of the games consists of four coed sports over two days, with two sports being played the first day and two the second. These sports are chosen by the host school and have included basketball, volleyball, dodgeball, ultimate Frisbee, curling, soccer, and inner tube water polo, among others. The 2012 Games sports included volleyball, dodge ball, ultimate Frisbee and inner tube water polo.

=== Spirit ===
Teams are judged on and score points in 'spirit' events throughout the weekend. These events are designed to promote and encourage teamwork, enthusiasm, camaraderie, and spirit from the competition's start to finish. The 2012 Games Spirit Award was based on the following: Presentation of University (Opening), MBA Jeopardy, Scavenger Hunt, Two Mystery Events, and Overall Team Spirit.

== Past Queen's Cup Winners ==
| Year | Champion | Host School |
|---|---|---|
| 1988 | Example | Queen's University, Kingston |
| 1989 | Example | Queen's University, Kingston |
| 1990 | Example | Queen's University, Kingston |
| 1991 | Example | Queen's University, Kingston |
| 1992 | Example | Queen's University, Kingston |
| 1993 | Example | Queen's University, Kingston |
| 1994 | McMaster University | Queen's University, Kingston |
| 1995 | Example | Queen's University, Kingston |
| 1996 | Université Laval | McGill University, Montreal |
| 1997 | Saint Mary's University | Ivey, University of Western Ontario, London |
| 1998 | ESG UQAM | Example |
| 1999 | ESG UQAM | Example |
| 2000 | Ivey, University of Western Ontario | Example |
| 2001 | University of Alberta School of Business | Example |
| 2002 | University of Alberta School of Business | University of Alberta School of Business |
| 2003 | Schulich School of Business, York University | DeGroote School of Business, McMaster University |
| 2004 | Schulich School of Business, York University | Schulich School of Business, York University |
| 2005 | Université Laval | Example |
| 2006 | Université Laval | Example |
| 2007 | DeGroote School of Business, McMaster University | University of Alberta School of Business |
| 2008 | Ted Rogers School of Management, Ryerson University | DeGroote School of Business, McMaster University, Hamilton |
| 2009 | Université Laval | Dalhousie University, Halifax |
| 2010 | Schulich School of Business, York University | Université Laval, Québec |
| 2011 | University of Alberta School of Business | Schulich School of Business, Toronto |
| 2012 | DeGroote School of Business, McMaster University | University of Alberta School of Business, Edmonton |
| 2013 | Schulich School of Business, York University | DeGroote School of Business, McMaster University, Hamilton |
| 2014 | DeGroote School of Business, McMaster University | Schulich School of Business, Toronto |
| 2015 | Schulich School of Business, York University | DeGroote School of Business, McMaster University, Hamilton |
| 2016 | DeGroote School of Business, McMaster University | Schulich School of Business, Toronto |
| 2017 | Faculty of Management, Vancouver Island University | Vancouver Island University, Nanaimo |
| 2018 | Schulich School of Business, York University | Telfer School of Management, University of Ottawa, Ottawa |
| 2019 | DeGroote School of Business, McMaster University | Ted Rogers School of Management, Ryerson University, Toronto |
| 2020 | DeGroote School of Business, McMaster University | DeGroote School of Business, McMaster University, Hamilton |
| 2021 | Schulich School of Business, York University | Université Laval, Québec |
