= Canadian Letters and Images Project =

The Canadian Letters and Images Project is an online, digital archive of Canadian war-time letters and related materials, created and maintained by history professor Dr. Stephen Davies at Vancouver Island University.

The project is an online archive of the Canadian war experience from all periods of Canada's past, both home front and battlefront. Begun in the summer of 2000, it is the largest online archive of primary materials in Canada relating to Canada's war experience. Through the digitization of contemporary letters, diaries, photographs and other related materials, it permits Canadians to tell their story, and Canada's story, in their own words and images. Since its creation the project has located, borrowed and electronically preserved more than 35,000 letters as well as thousands of photographs, numerous diaries and countless miscellaneous items.

As the materials in the collections are generally not publicly accessible anywhere else, the project has brought into the public domain tens of thousands of items which would not otherwise be seen by Canadians. These materials, because of their personal nature, serve to humanize war and focus on individual participants. In doing so, the project is a means to give back some of that full dimension of life to otherwise forgotten, and by normative measures, unremarkable Canadians.

The Canadian Letters and Images Project is unique in approach as well as content. As an online digital archive it only borrows the materials from Canadians, digitizes them, and then returns the items to the donors. Families are understandably reluctant to part with these materials through a permanent donation to an archive or museum. The work of the project strikes a balance between the desire of the family to hold on to their valued family heirlooms and at the same time their desire to share the experiences of their family members with others.
