= University of Mount Union =

Private university in Alliance, Ohio, US

- Former names: Select School (1846–1849); Mount Union Seminary (1849–1858); Mount Union College (1858–2010)
- Motto: Sit Lux
- Motto in English: Let there be light
- Type: Private liberal arts
- Established: 1846; 180 years ago
- Affiliations: NAICU
- Endowment: $187.7 million (2025)
- President: Gregory L. King
- Students: 2,169 (fall 2023)
- Undergraduates: 1,927 (fall 2023)
- Postgraduates: 242 (fall 2023)
- Location: Alliance, Ohio, United States; 40°54′17″N 81°6′38″W
- Campus: Suburban, 115 acres (0.47 km^{2})
- Colors: Purple and White
- Nickname: Purple Raiders
- Sporting affiliations: NCAA Division III – OAC
- Mascot: MUcaw
- Website: www.mountunion.edu

The University of Mount Union is a private liberal arts university in Alliance, Ohio, United States. Founded in 1846, the university was affiliated with the Methodist Church until 2019. It had an enrollment of 2,100 students as of 2023.

== History ==
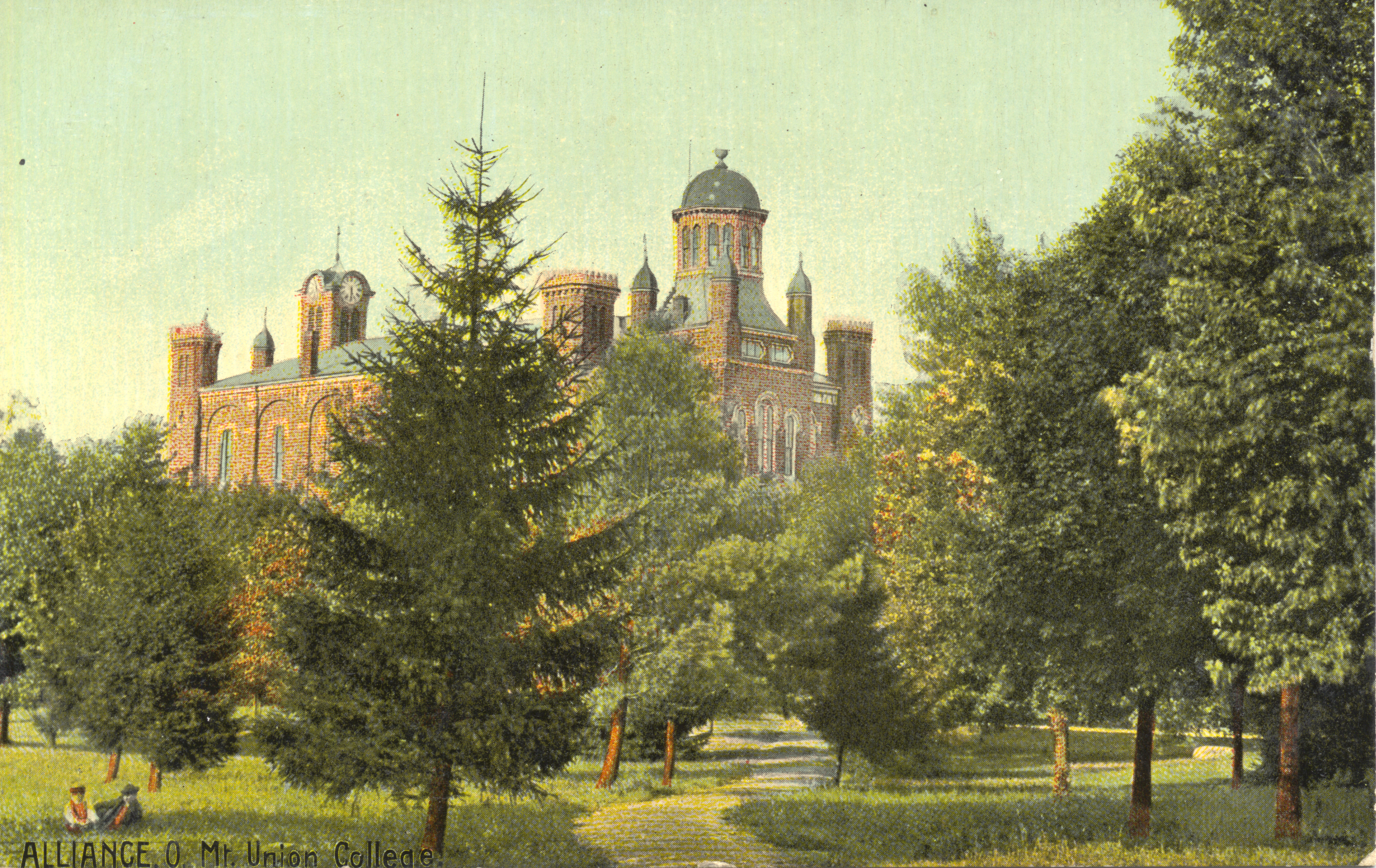
Postcard of the early Mount Union College campus

Mount Union was founded in 1846 by Orville Nelson Hartshorn as the Select School as "a place where men and women could be educated with equal opportunity, science would parallel the humanities, and there would be no distinction due to race, color, or sex." Only three years after opening, in 1849, it was renamed as the Mount Union Seminary.

The school would not be chartered under Ohio state law until June 9, 1856, after which it adopted the name Mount Union College.

In approximately 1911, Scio College of Scio, Ohio, merged with Mount Union, moving faculty to the Mount Union campus and abandoning the Scio campus. Mount Union College was renamed University of Mount Union effective August 1, 2010.

== Campus ==
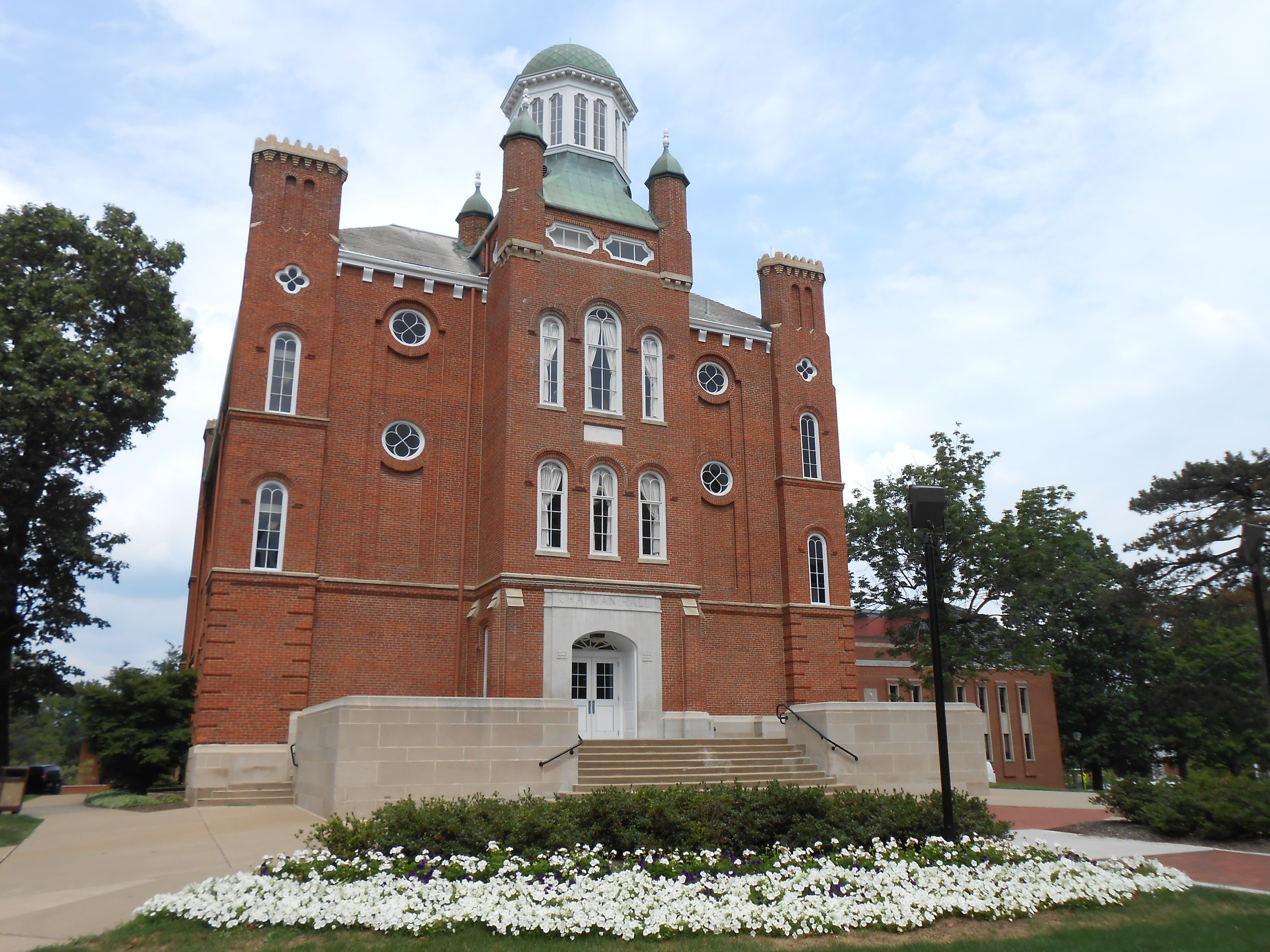
Chapman Hall houses many of the humanities classrooms and faculty offices.

The University of Mount Union is located on a 123-acre (50-hectare) campus in Alliance, Ohio, 70 miles (110 kilometers) from Cleveland, Ohio, and 80 miles (130 kilometers) from Pittsburgh, Pennsylvania. The university's 162-acre (66-hectare) Huston-Brumbaugh Nature Center is approximately six miles away from the campus. Two buildings, Chapman Hall and Miller Hall, are listed in the National Register of Historic Places. Kehres Stadium is the oldest college stadium in the state of Ohio.

== Academics ==
Mount Union offers 46 majors and 47 minors as undergraduate programs. The university also offers Pre-Health/Pre-Medicine and Pre-Law programs. Mount Union offers 13 master's degree programs, most of which are online. The university also has a Doctor of Physical Therapy program and a Family Nurse Practitioner certificate program.

Eighty-five percent of the faculty at Mount Union have earned a doctoral degree or other terminal degree with graduate training at universities in the United States and Europe.

=== Rankings ===
In 2024, U.S. News & World Report ranked Mount Union tied for No. 24 out of 167 in Regional Universities Midwest, No. 9 in Regional Universities Midwest Best Value Schools, tied for No. 59 in Top Performers on Social Mobility in Regional Universities Midwest, tied for No. 223 in Best Undergraduate Engineering Programs at schools where a doctorate is not offered, and tied for No. 345 in Nursing.

=== Undergraduate admissions ===
In 2024, Mount Union accepted 75.7% of undergraduate applicants, with those admitted having an average 3.33 high school GPA. The university does not require submission of standardized test scores, Mount Union being a test optional school where scores will only be considered if scores increase the scholarship level for which the applicant is eligible although applicants who choose not to submit test scores are still eligible for academic scholarships. Those accepted that submitted test scores had an average 1070 SAT score (17% submitting scores) or average 22 ACT score (64% submitting scores). An application essay is required.

== Student life ==
Mount Union's radio station is 91.1 WRMU, and the campus paper is The Dynamo.

The university's music program offers participation in numerous bands and choirs, including Concert Choir, Mount Union Alliance Chorale, Opera Workshop, Alliance Symphony Orchestra, Repertory Strings, Marching Band, The Raider Steel Band, Jazz Band, Percussion Ensemble, and more.

The Theatre Department puts on two productions every fall, and varying productions in the spring. Every spring semester alternates between a musical and a straight play every year for the main stage show, and every spring there are also student-directed one-acts. Theatre productions are open to all students, regardless of major or class rank.

In the spring of 2019, the University of Mount Union started its Esports program by fielding its first Overwatch roster. Later, the team began competing in Overwatch, League of Legends, and Rocket League.

=== Greek Life ===
There are four major social fraternities and four major social sororities with chapters at the institution. All eight chapters complete thousands of hours of community service and donate thousands of dollars to philanthropic organizations each semester. Greek Life at Mount Union is well known on the campus and throughout the community.

Fraternities	Greek Symbol	Founded Nationally	Nickname
Alpha Tau Omega	ΑΤΩ	1865	A-T-O
Phi Kappa Tau	ΦΚΤ	1906	P-K-T
Sigma Alpha Epsilon	ΣΑΕ	1856	S-A-E
Sigma Nu	ΣΝ	1869	Sig Nu

Sororities	Greek Symbol	Founded Nationally	Nickname
Alpha Chi Omega	ΑΧΩ	1885	A-Chi-O
Alpha Delta Pi	ΑΔΠ	1851	A-D-Pi
Alpha Xi Delta	ΑΞΔ	1893	A-Z-D
Delta Sigma Tau	ΔΣΤ	1990	D-S-T

== Athletics ==
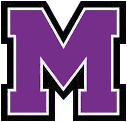
Mount Union athletics logo

Mount Union's school colors are purple and white and competes in the Ohio Athletic Conference and in NCAA Division III athletics. The teams are nicknamed Purple Raiders, and the school's mascot is MUcaw, a purple macaw.

Mount Union sponsors 12 men's varsity teams: baseball, basketball, cross-country, football, golf, track & field, soccer, swimming, diving, tennis, lacrosse, wrestling, and volleyball. The school also sponsors 12 women's varsity teams: basketball, cross-country, flag football, golf, lacrosse, track & field, soccer, softball, swimmingand diving, tennis, volleyball, and wrestling.

Intramural sports include flag football, dodgeball, innertube water polo, ultimate frisbee, beach volleyball, 2 person golf scramble, men's basketball, women's basketball, softball, indoor soccer, indoor volleyball, 2 on 2 basketball, badminton, and pickleball.

Mount won the NCAA Men's Division III Cross Country Championship in 1974 under Coach Jim Wuske, the NCAA Men's Division III Indoor Track and Field Championships in 2017, and in 2014 and 2018 Mount Union won the NCAA Men's Division III Outdoor Track and Field Championships under Coach Kevin Lucas. The men’s basketball team was retroactively listed of the top team of the 1897–98 season by the Premo-Porretta Power Poll.

=== Football ===
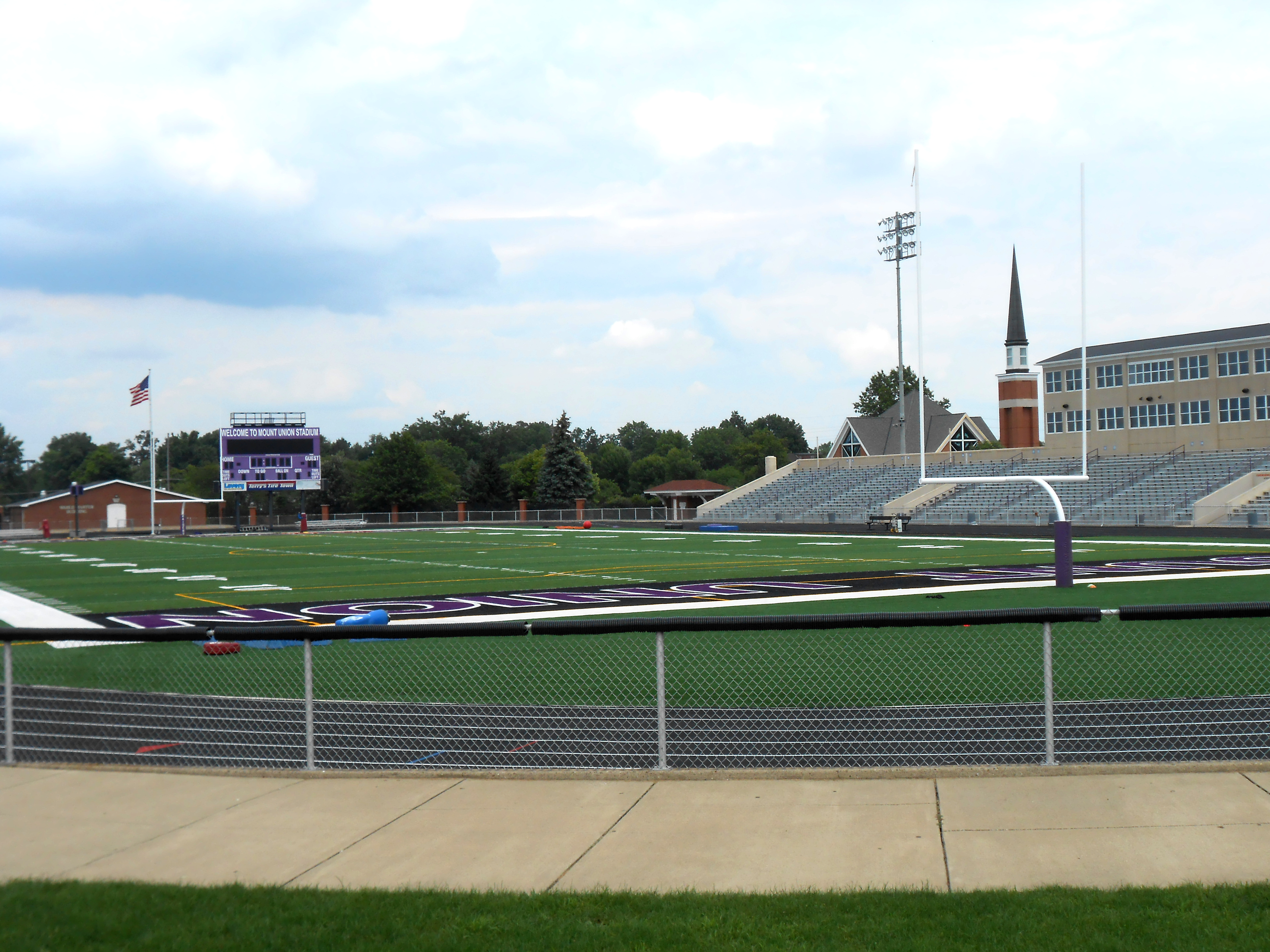
Kehres Stadium, home of the Mount Union football team

Mount Union's football is currently led by head coach Geoff Dartt. The Purple Raiders have claimed 13 NCAA Division III Football Championships, 36 OAC titles, and have 12 undefeated seasons.

Mount Union holds the all-division record for consecutive victories at 55 from 2000 to 2003, which ended with their loss to St. John's University (Collegeville, MN) in the Amos Alonzo Stagg Bowl (Division III National Championship) on December 20, 2003. Mount Union previously held the all divisions mark at 54 consecutive games until losing in the semifinals on December 12, 1999, to Rowan University (Glassboro, NJ). During both the 55 and 54 game streaks, Mount Union won 3 consecutive National Championships. Since both streaks were connected, Mount Union won 109 of 110 games played from 1997 to 2003. The Purple Raiders won 110 consecutive regular-season games between 1994 and 2005 (which was ended by conference foe Ohio Northern University on Oct 22, 2005), posted 14 undefeated regular seasons, won 16 Ohio Athletic Conference Championships, and had the best overall record in the 1990s (120–7–1, an overall winning percentage of 0.941).
