= NYC Social Sports Club =

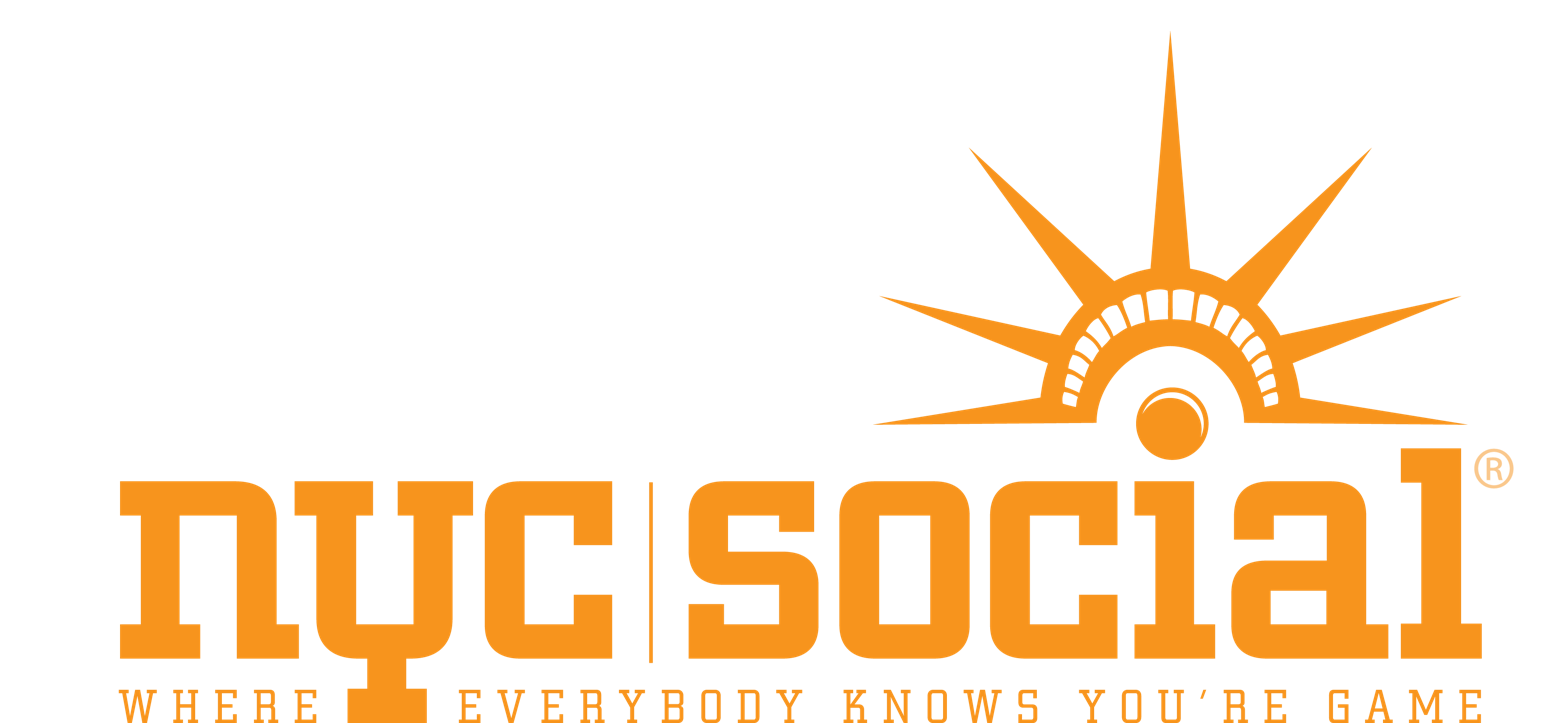
NYC Social Logo

The NYC Social Sports Club (NYC Social) offers co-ed adult sports leagues in New York City. The club offers four 10-week seasons each year, as well as pickup games and individual tournaments and parties.

== Overview ==
NYC Social regularly offers full seasons of dodgeball, kickball, bowling, broomball, flag football, ultimate frisbee, volleyball, soccer, inner tube water polo, trivia and other social sports. Most sports are played in Manhattan, with some in Brooklyn. The club has also organized tournaments involving games such as flip cup, rock-paper-scissors, and four square.

On its website, the club emphasizes the social aspect of its leagues. Each and every league has a 'sponsor bar' where the players have a chance to meet each other over alcoholic drinks. There are post-game bar socials after each game, everyone is encouraged to participate post game as it is an integral part of the experience.

== History ==
The club was started in July, 2004 by Amy Short. It began with 60 active members. As of late 2010, the club services over 10,000 members annually. The club continues to grow: As of mid-2012, it has boasted over 20,000 members.

Past sports, not currently offered, include mini golf and wiffleball.

== Media ==
The club has been featured in several media outlets, including The New York Times, Good Morning America, Time Out (magazine), The Village Voice, New York Post, AM New York, Thrillist, and Columbia News Service.
