= Louise Mandell =

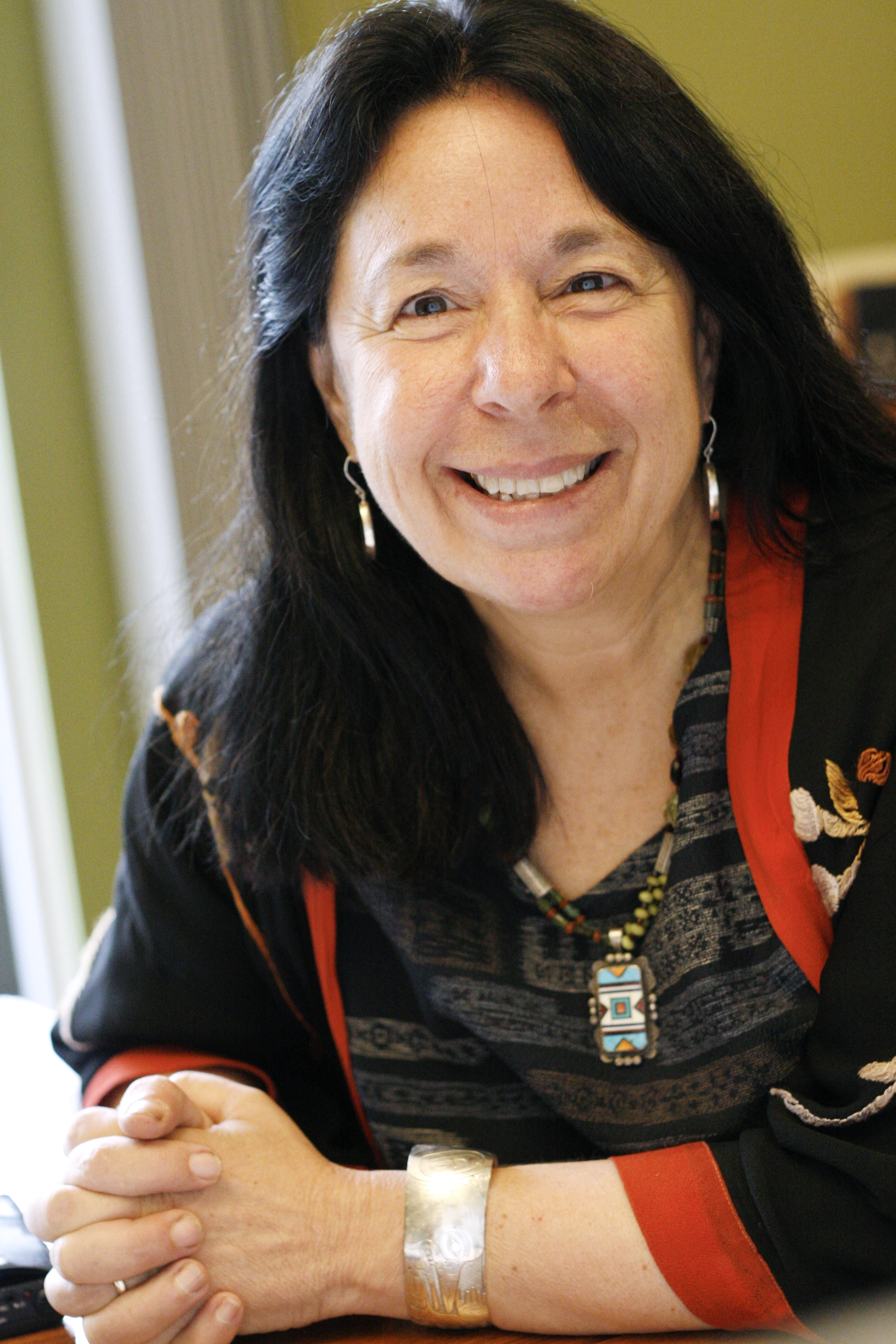
Louise Mandell

Louise Mandell, QC, is a Canadian lawyer who serves as the chancellor of Vancouver Island University. Born in Toronto, Ontario, she is an advocate of Aboriginal rights since 1977, and was a founder of Mandell Pinder law firm, which was established in 1983. She was appointed Queens Counsel in 1997, and in 2001 was awarded the Georges Goyer QC Memorial Award for her work with Indigenous peoples. Of particular note is her work with the Union of British Columbia Indian Chiefs. Hired by George Manuel along with Leslie Pinder, Mandell became a researcher and lawyer for the Union in 1977 and quickly became an effective judicial advocate, winning numerous cases that advanced Indigenous rights.
