= Beedie School of Business =

Canadian business school

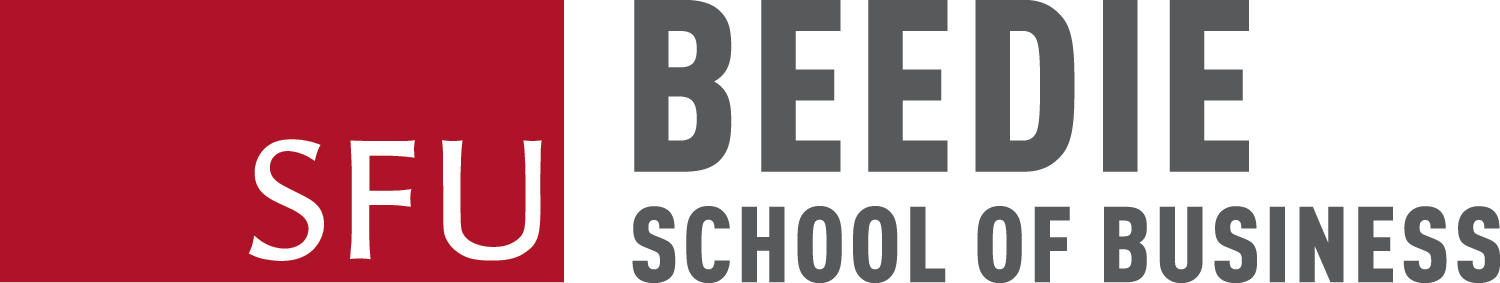
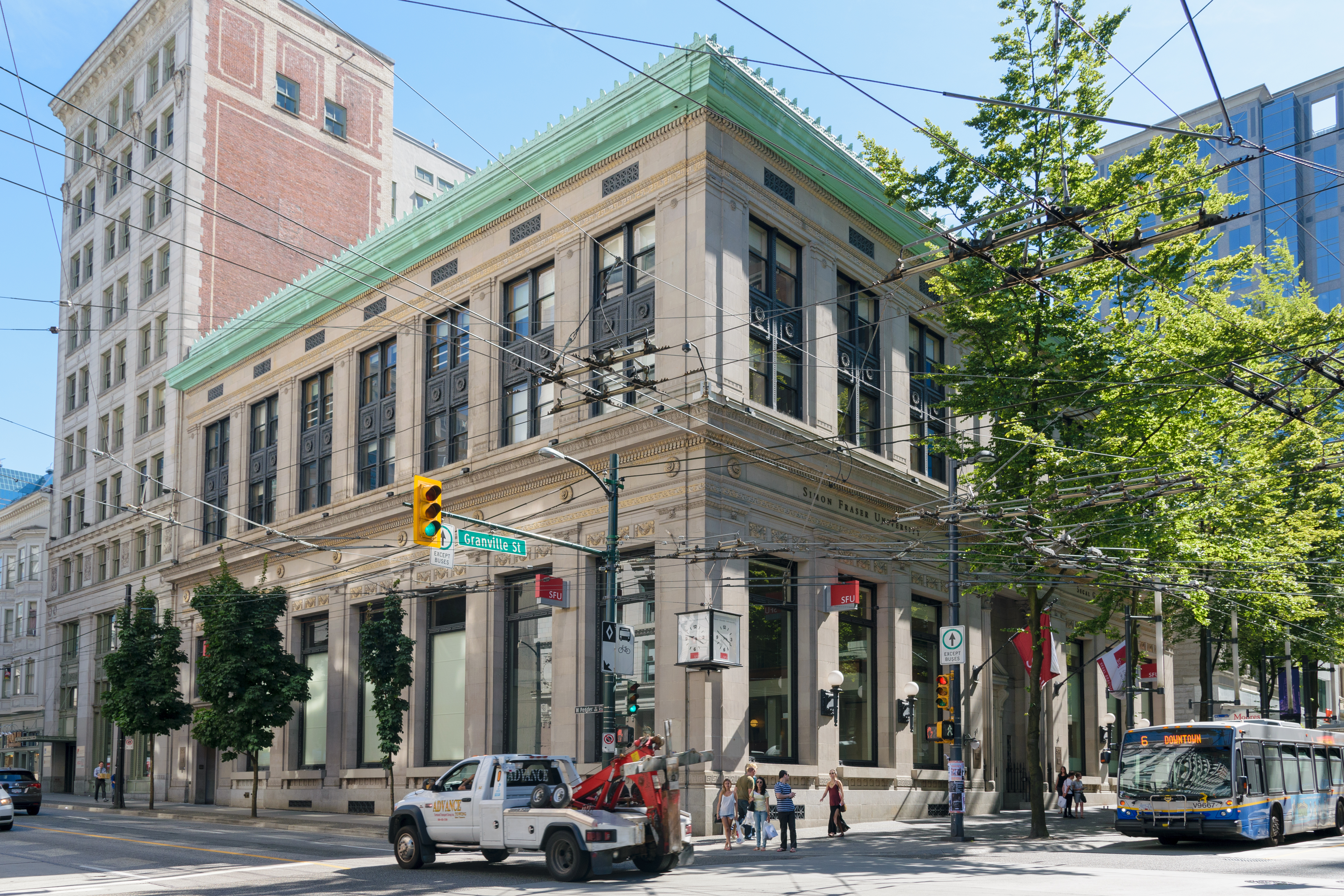
- Type: Public business school
- Established: 1965
- Accreditation: AACSB, EQUIS
- Dean: Marvin Washington
- Faculty: 250
- Undergraduates: 3,800
- Postgraduates: 800 (MBA, EMBA, IBL EMBA, MSc Fin, MOT MBA, PhD, GDBA)
- Location: Metro Vancouver, British Columbia, Canada; 49.2796°N 122.91875°W (Burnaby campus)
- Website: http://beedie.sfu.ca/

The Beedie School of Business ("SFU Beedie") is the business school at Simon Fraser University (SFU) with multiple campuses across the Lower Mainland in British Columbia, Canada. Simon Fraser University was founded in 1965 and by 1982, the business discipline had grown to sufficient size to become its own distinct faculty, and the Bachelor of Business Administration (BBA) degree was established.

SFU Beedie operates on all three SFU campuses, with over 3,800 undergraduate BBA students in the Vancouver suburbs of Burnaby and Surrey; over 800 MBA and graduate students in SFU Beedie's Segal Graduate School in downtown Vancouver and SFU Surrey; non-credit programs at the director, executive and management levels; and a PhD program.

SFU's Beedie School of Business is accredited by the Association to Advance Collegiate Schools of Business (AACSB) and the EFMD Quality Improvement System (EQUIS).

== History ==
In 1968, SFU Beedie established the Executive MBA (EMBA) program, the first of its kind in Canada. Since 2000, the school has launched the Management of Technology MBA, the Master of Science in Finance program, and a full-time and part-time MBA. In 2011, the school launched the world's first Executive MBA for the Americas in partnership with graduate business schools at Vanderbilt University (U.S.), Instituto Tecnológico Autónomo de México (Mexico) and Institute of Management Foundation (Brazil). That same year, it launched Canada's first Indigenous Business Leadership Executive MBA, the first accredited MBA program in North America addressing Indigenous business, economic development and entrepreneurship. In 2011, the school received a donation in the amount of $22 million from alumnus Ryan Beedie and his father Keith, establishing SFU's Beedie School of Business. In 2014, the school introduced the Graduate Certificate in Science and Technology Commercialization, a full-time certificate program providing research scientists and engineers with the frameworks, perspectives, and techniques needed for fostering product development and commercialization. In 2016, SFU Beedie alumnus Charles Chang presented a $10 million gift to Simon Fraser University to establish SFU's Charles Chang Institute for Entrepreneurship. SFU Beedie partnered with Mitacs in 2019 to develop the Mitacs Invention to Innovation (i2I) skills training program, now a national program with regional delivery partners Queen’s, Polytechnique, Memorial and Dalhousie Universities.

== Campuses ==
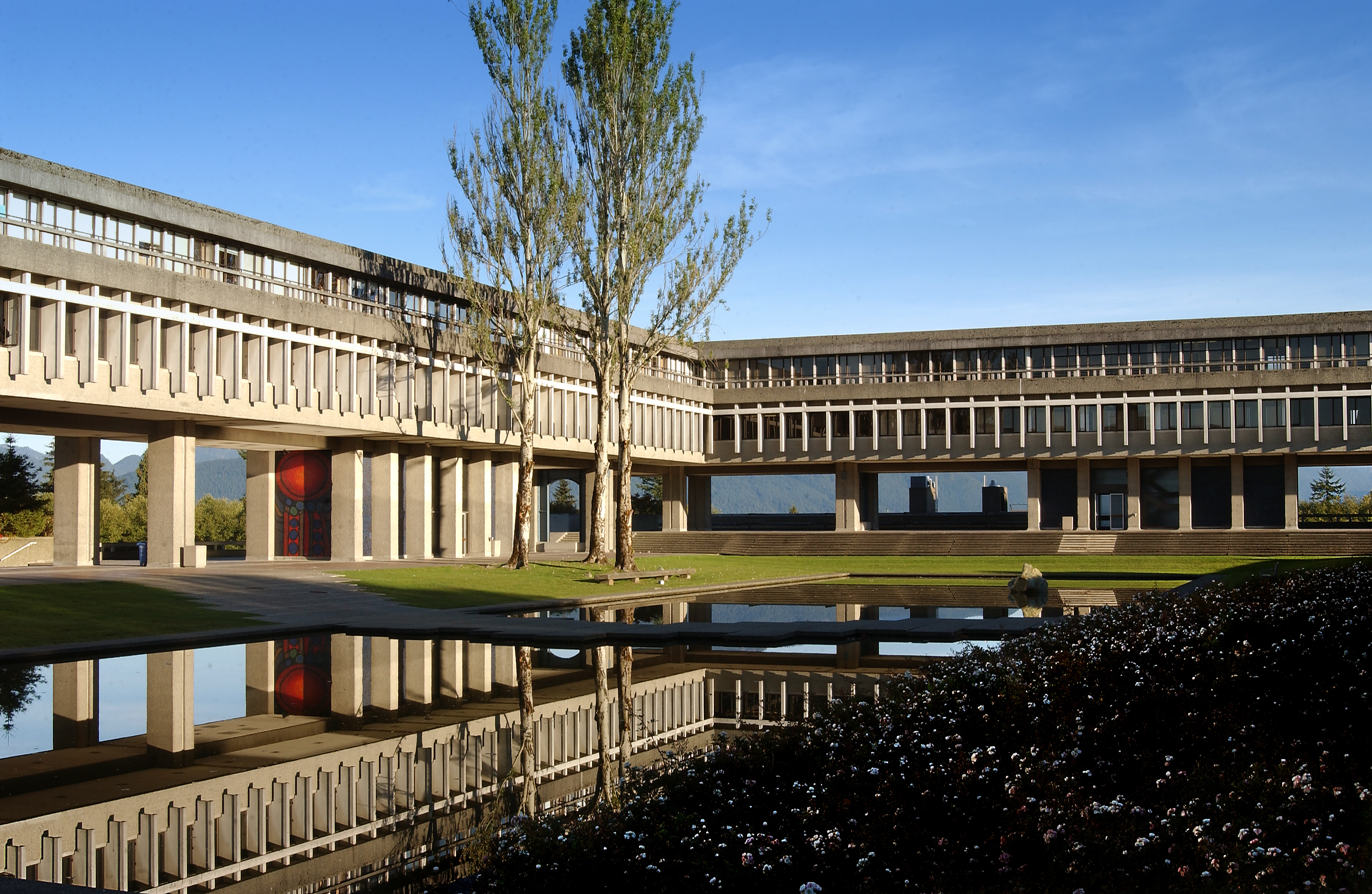
SFU's Burnaby campus

=== Burnaby ===
SFU Beedie's Burnaby campus is home to the Bachelor of Business Administration (BBA) undergraduate program, which hosts over 3,800 students.

=== Surrey ===
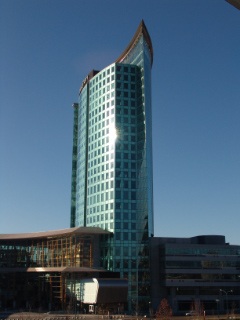
SFU's Surrey campus

SFU Beedie's Surrey campus is a 30,000 square-metre institution located at Central City in Surrey. The building, designed by architect Bing Thom, has won numerous national and international awards. SFU's Beedie School of Business offers the undergraduate Entrepreneurship and Innovation Program and the Part-Time MBA Program at the Surrey campus.

=== Downtown Vancouver: SFU Beedie's Segal Graduate School ===
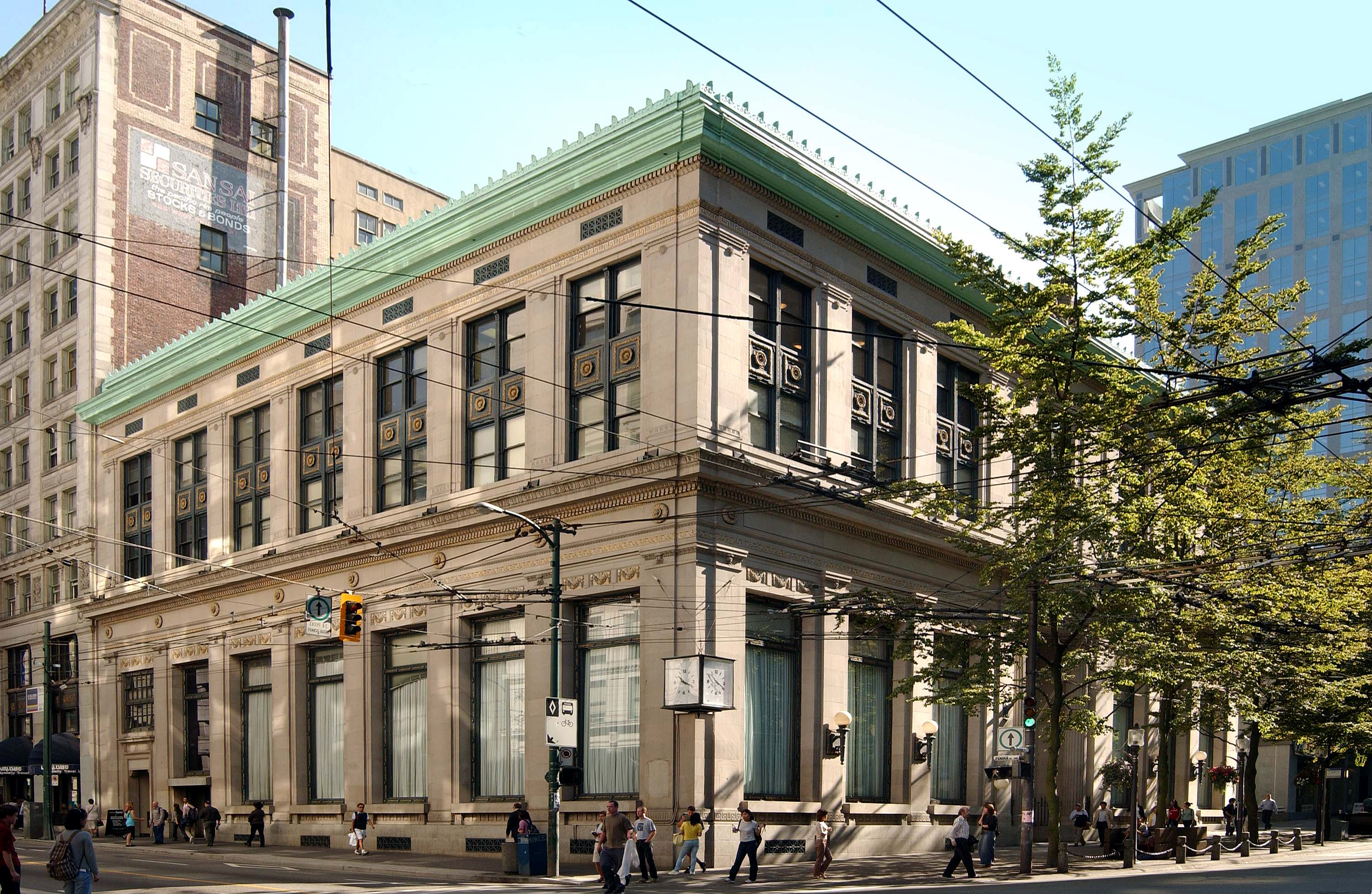
SFU Beedie's Segal Graduate School campus

A 1916 building located at the corner of Granville and Pender Streets in downtown Vancouver, SFU Beedie's Segal Graduate School is home to SFU's graduate business programs. It honours the university's former chancellor and SFU Beedie supporter Joseph Segal.

Opened in 2005 and previously the Western Canada headquarters for the Bank of Montreal, the building underwent a $20 million renovation under architect Paul Merrick. The designers were able to retain many of the building's original features and materials, including marble columns, decorative plaster mouldings and stair balustrades. Two of the original vault doors were refurbished and installed as a decorative feature at the entrance to the student commons area.

The downtown campus of SFU's Beedie School of Business is home to all graduate programs, including: the Executive MBA, MBA, Indigenous Business Leadership Executive MBA, Management of Technology MBA, Master of Science in Finance, Graduate Diploma in Business Administration, and PhD.

== Jack Austin Centre for Asia-Pacific Business Studies ==
The Jack Austin Centre for Asia-Pacific Business Studies is a joint venture of SFU's Beedie School of Business and the Asia Pacific Foundation of Canada to provide research, outreach and training activities on business issues that are relevant to Canada's interests in the Asia Pacific region with a focus on innovation and entrepreneurship. The centre was named for Jack Austin, in recognition of his work in Asia–Canada relations.

== Notable alumni ==
- Francesco Aquilini, owner of the Vancouver Canucks and Rogers Arena: BBA, 1985
- Terry Beech, Member of Parliament for Burnaby North: BBA, 2006
- Hon. Gordon Campbell, former MLA, Premier of British Columbia (2001-2011): MBA, 1978
- Jim Chu, chief constable, Vancouver Police Department: BBA, 1986
- Zabeen Hirji, chief human resources officer, Royal Bank of Canada: MBA 1994
- Alan Juristovski, co-founder and chief executive officer, MetroLeap Media; co-founder, Urban Surface Solutions Inc.: EMBA, 2001
- Sam Sullivan, president, Global Civic Policy Society; former CM, Mayor of Vancouver: BBA, 1987
- Milun Tesovic, founder, MetroLyrics; Co-Founder & CTO, MetroLeap Media: BBA 2008
- Jay Triano, head coach, Canadian men's basketball team; assistant coach, Portland Trail Blazers; head coach of NBA's Toronto Raptors: BBA, 1982
- Lance Uggla, chief executive officer and founder, Markit: BBA, 1985
