= MetroLyrics =

Website displaying song lyrics

- Founded: December 30, 2002; 23 years ago
- Dissolved: June 29, 2021
- Headquarters: Vancouver, British Columbia, {{{location_country}}}
- Founders: Milun Tesovic, Alan Juristovski
- Services: Lyrics
- Employees: 10+
- Parent: Red Ventures
- Website: www.metrolyrics.com

MetroLyrics was a website dedicated to song lyrics. It was founded in December 2002, and its database contained over one million songs by over 16,000 artists. The site abruptly went offline in late June 2021, and its webmasters have never commented on its closing.

== History ==
In 2008, MetroLyrics was the first lyrics-dedicated site to license Gracenote Inc.'s lyrics catalogue. Through its licensing model, copyright holders of lyrics accrued royalty revenue when their work was displayed on MetroLyrics.com, which MetroLyrics recouped by collecting money from banner advertisements on its site. Royalties were paid on all displayed lyrics and were handled through Gracenote. In January 2013, LyricFind acquired Gracenote's lyrics licensing business, merging it in with their own. MetroLyrics' licensing model was distinct, as many lyrics websites offer content that is unlicensed and possibly copyright infringing. Unlike other lyric websites, MetroLyrics placed a warning on songs containing explicit lyrics.

MetroLyrics was acquired by CBS Interactive in October 2011. Red Ventures acquired the CNET Media Group, including MetroLyrics, from CBS Interactive in 2020.
