= Milun Tesovic =

- Born: August 6, 1985 (age 41); Sarajevo, SR Bosnia and Herzegovina, SFR Yugoslavia (now Bosnia and Herzegovina)
- Education: Simon Fraser University (BBA)
- Known for: Founder of MetroLyrics.com; Co-founder of MetroLeap Media Inc.; Partner Expa; Founder cmd.com; Founder gitalytics.com

Milun Tesovic (born August 6, 1985) is a Canadian computer engineer, entrepreneur and investor. He is best known for creating the Metrolyrics website, which he sold to CBS Interactive Music Group in 2011.

== Early life and education ==
Milun Tesovic was born on August 6, 1985, in Sarajevo, SR Bosnia and Herzegovina, one of the constituent republics of the former Socialist Federal Republic of Yugoslavia. In 1994, during the Bosnian War, Tesovic emigrated to Canada with his father, mother and sister. He has cited his immigrant background for making him a self-motivated and hardworking person.

Tesovic attended Simon Fraser University, where he received a Bachelor of Business Administration degree in Entrepreneurship in 2012. He completed his studies while running Metrolyrics.

== Career ==
At age 16, Milun created the online music website Metrolyrics with his partner Alan Juristovski. The website grew to become the "most comprehensive database of legal music lyrics in the world" and in 2011, it was sold to CBS Interactive Music Group in a reported eight-figure deal. In 2011, it stored more than 700,000 song lyrics and was receiving traffic of 45 million visitors a month according to Google Analytics.

Following his music endeavor, he joined up with Garrett Camp, co-founder of Uber at Expa in 2016 to fund and build alongside other founders.

Gitalytics is another company started by Milun which was acquired by Microsoft in 2019, and now part of the GitHub Enterprise suite.

His latest endeavor was cmd.com, a cybersecurity company focused on real time kernel authentication of events, which processed TBs of data for large organizations in sensitive environments and was acquired by ElasticSearch in 2021. In all, cmd.com raised $21.6M total from VCs such as Google Ventures and Expa.

Milun is also involved in other endeavors, such as aero.com, and other projects originating from Expa.

== Personal life ==
In 2021, Tesovic reportedly purchased Scooter Braun's old home in West Hollywood for $9.6 million and in 2022 purchased a home in Beverly Hills, California from tennis player Naomi Osaka for $8.7 million.

== Honors ==
- Billboard Top 30 Under 30
