= Paul J. Hill School of Business =

Undergraduate business school

- Type: Public
- Affiliations: L'Association des universités de la francophonie canadienne, Canadian Interuniversity Sport (CIS), CUSID, UArctic, Association of Universities and Colleges of Canada (UACC), CWUAA
- Location: Regina, Saskatchewan, Canada
- Campus: Old (Regina College) campus on College Avenue; new campus on Wascana Parkway
- Colours: Green and gold
- Nicknames: Regina Cougars and Regina Rams
- Mascots: Reggie the Cougar and Ram-page
- Website: www.uregina.ca

The Paul J. Hill School of Business is a Canadian undergraduate business school within the Faculty of Business Administration at the University of Regina in Regina, Saskatchewan. The undergraduate school was named for local benefactor Paul J. Hill who donated $10 million to the University.

The Faculty of Business Administration's graduate school is known as the Levene Graduate School of Business.

== History ==
The business school at University of Regina was renamed as the Paul J. Hill School of Business after a donation on $10 million was made by his family.

== Programs ==
The Paul J. Hill School of Business offers a Bachelor of Business Administration (BBA). The Kenneth Levene Graduate School of Business offers a Master of Business Administration (MBA), a Master of Human Resource Management (MHRM), and a Master of Administration in Leadership.

== See also ==
- Higher education in Saskatchewan
