= Vancouver Island University =

Canadian public university

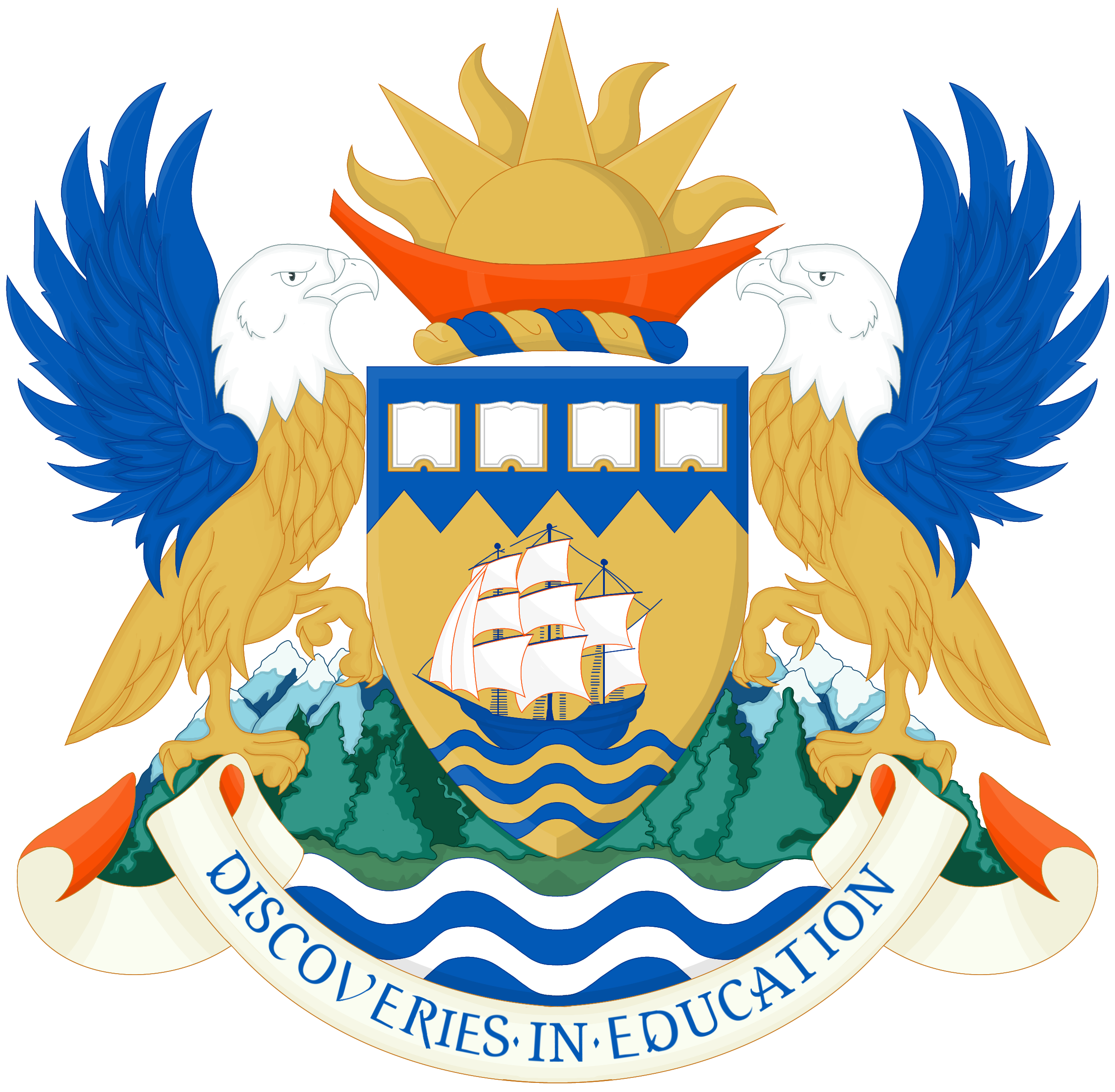
- Type: Public Liberal Arts University
- Established: (1969–1988 as Malaspina College); (1988–2008 as Malaspina University-College); (September 1, 2008–present) Vancouver Island University
- Academic affiliations: Universities Canada
- Endowment: C$26.3 million
- Chancellor: Judith Sayers
- President: Dennis Johnson (Interim)
- Students: 5,965 (2024–25 FTE)
- Location: Nanaimo, Powell River, Duncan, British Columbia, British Columbia, Canada; 49°09′26″N 123°57′59″W
- Colours: Navy and White
- Nickname: Mariners
- Sporting affiliations: CCAA – PACWEST
- Website: www.viu.ca

Vancouver Island University (abbreviated as VIU, formerly known as Malaspina University-College and Malaspina College) is a Canadian public research university serving Vancouver Island and coastal British Columbia. Malaspina College opened in 1969. The main campus is located in Nanaimo, with regional campuses in Duncan and Powell River.

== History ==
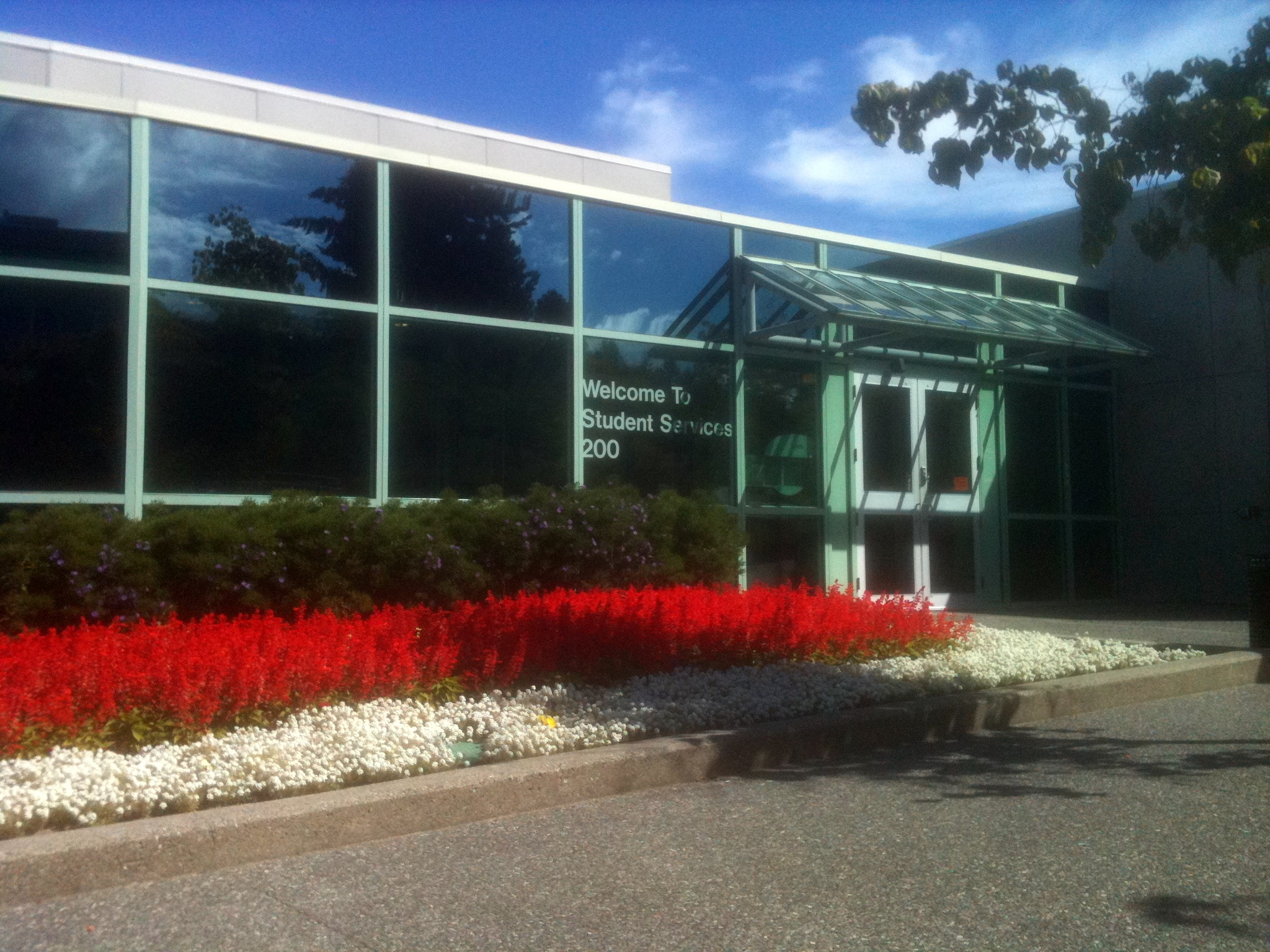
VIU Student Service Building

Vancouver Island University enrolled its first students in September 1969 as Malaspina College, named after Captain Alessandro Malaspina, who explored Vancouver Island. Registration in the first year was over 600 students, almost double what was initially expected. In 1976, after seven years at the original campus in the old Nanaimo Hospital building at 388 Machleary Street, Malaspina College moved to its new campus on Fifth Street (the present location of VIU) on former Department of National Defence land adjoining the existing Nanaimo Vocational Training School, which had offered trades programs since 1936. In anticipation of construction of a new campus, Malaspina College had merged administration with the existing vocational school in 1971.

Following a 1988 government initiative designed to increase access to degree programs in British Columbia, five community colleges in BC were granted authority to offer baccalaureate degrees, and these five institutions — Malaspina, Fraser Valley, Kwantlen, Cariboo and Okanagan—were renamed university colleges. Initially, they offered degrees through one of the three provincial universities.

Malaspina College had regional campuses in Nanaimo, Duncan, and Powell River by 1990. In the 1990s, several at Malaspina promoted the idea of the institution offering something distinct—interdisciplinary bachelor's degrees in Liberal Studies — and in 1995 the institution was awarded the authority to offer degrees in its own right. In 1995, the province of British Columbia enacted legislation changing the institution's name to Malaspina University-College and allowed it to begin granting academic degrees and college diplomas. Malaspina University-College's Arms and Badge were registered with the Canadian Heraldic Authority on May 20, 1995.

Malaspina University-College was designated a university under an amendment of the University Act and officially began operation as Vancouver Island University on September 1, 2008.

Vancouver Island University's first president was Dr. Carleton Opgaard. The first chancellor was Chief Shawn A-in-chut Atleo, who in 2009 became the national chief of the Assembly of First Nations. When VIU appointed Chief Atleo as Chancellor he became the first Indigenous person to hold this position in British Columbia. Deborah Saucier, who was appointed president in 2018, was the school's first female and first Métis president. Saucier resigned in March 2025, effective April 4.

The university press, The Navigator, established in 1969, is a member of Canadian University Press. The magazine Portal has been published by VIU students since 1991.

== Buildings and facilities ==
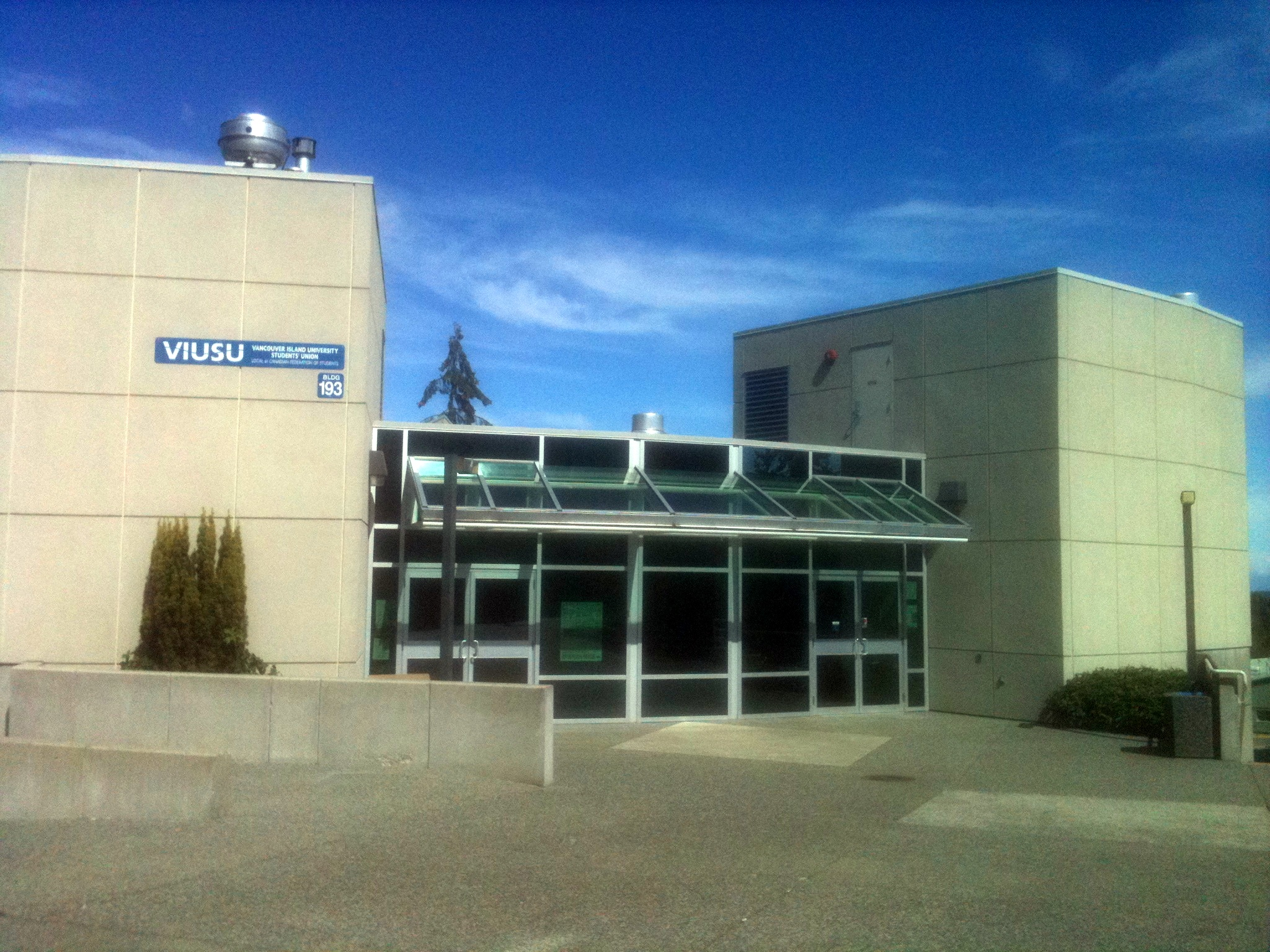
VIU Student Union Building

Occupying three campuses and a number of facilities including the Deep Bay Marine Field Station, and Milner Gardens and Woodlands, VIU has had many renovations and major developments in the past few years to accommodate its growing student body and faculty.

- Nanaimo Campus
- Cowichan Campus (Located in Duncan, BC)
- tiwšɛmawtxw (Located in Powell River, in the qathet region)

The main campus located in Nanaimo has 1,030,000 square feet (96,000 m^{2}) of built space. At this main campus, the most recent facility is the Dr. Ralph Nilson Centre for Health & Science and a new Marine, Automotive and Trades Complex, built with funding from the federal and provincial governments as well as through community support.

Another completed project is a district geo-exchange energy system, which uses the energy stored in the water found in the abandoned Wakesiah coal mine underneath the Nanaimo campus to heat and cool some of the university's facilities. This system is the first of its kind in Canada. It leverages the long-abandoned coal mining infrastructure to enable an environmentally responsible heating and cooling solution. This open loop geo-exchange system consumes no groundwater while heating and cooling buildings for only the cost of pumping the water. The electricity to power the pumps comes from hydroelectric sources, leading to a zero emissions heating and cooling solution.

In 2006, a 39,000-square-foot (3,600 m^{2}) Faculty of Management Centre opened certified Leadership in Energy and Environmental Design (LEED), and a renovated 100,000-square-foot (9,300 m^{2}) library (completed 2005) that offers extensive online and print collections, a special collections reading room, group study rooms, multimedia AV rooms, and computer stations. The VIU Campus Store is also located in the library building.

The Nanaimo campus is home to the Richard W. Johnston Centre for International Education, a gymnasium and fitness facilities; art and music studios; science and computer labs; research centres; a campus career centre; cafeterias; and a student centre on a 92-acre (37 ha) campus.

Other notable areas on the Nanaimo campus include Shq'apthut: A Gathering Place, which houses the Elders-in-Residence and staff from VIU's Office of Indigenous Education and Engagement; the Kwulasulwut Garden that honours Coast Salish elder and retired VIU Elder-in-Residence Ellen White; two traditional Japanese-style gardens; and the Jardin des quatorze (Garden of the Fourteen), which commemorates the women who died in the 1989 mass shooting at the École Polytechnique in Montreal.

In 2011, VIU opened a new campus in Cowichan which is built to LEED Gold Certification. The campus has a rooftop garden and a geo-exchange system which heats and cools the building.

== Core programs ==
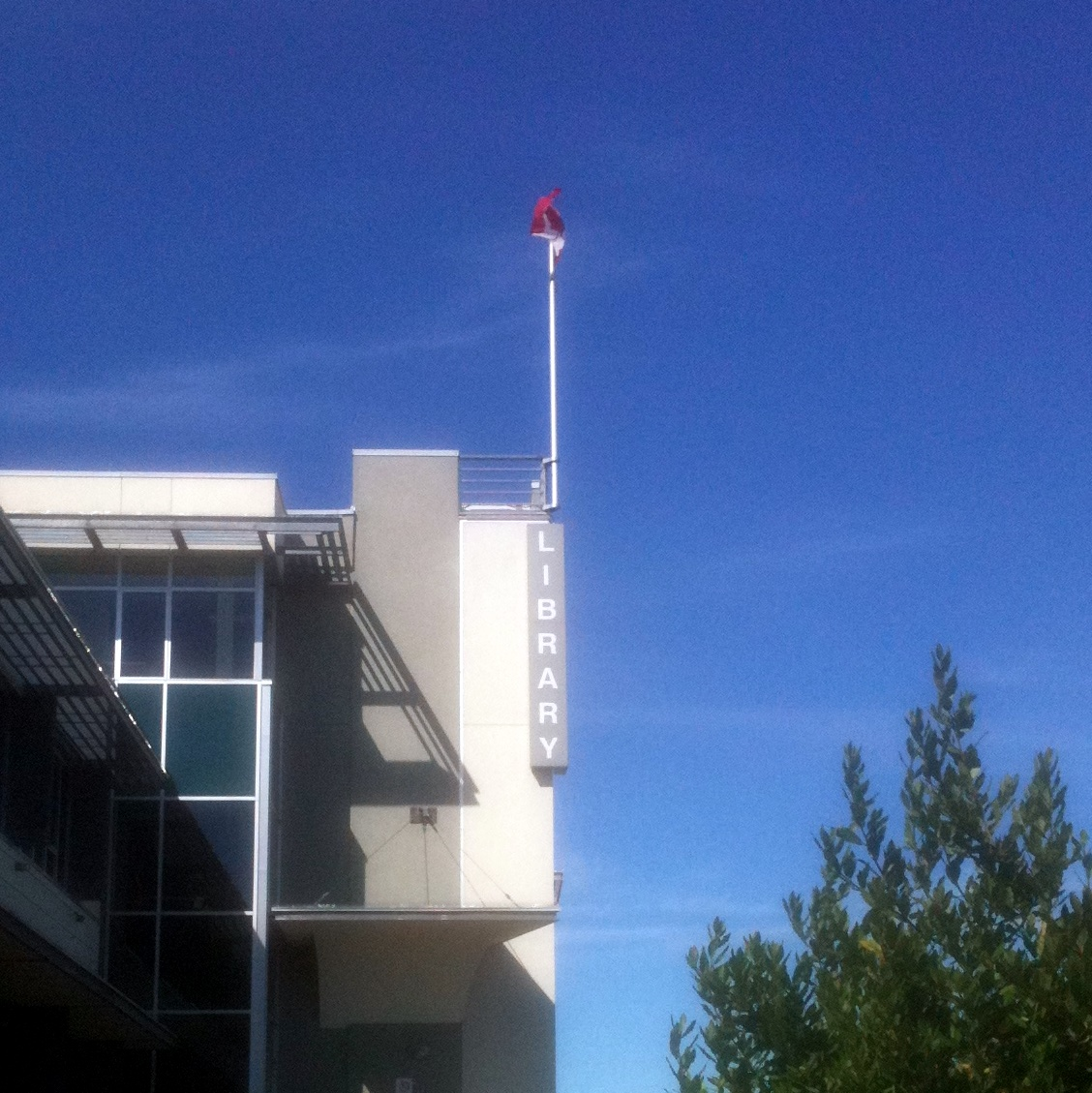
VIU Library

University rankings

World rankings
- QS World: 1001–1200

Canadian rankings
- QS National: 28–30

Vancouver Island University offers master's and bachelor's degrees; two year diplomas, and one year certificate programs in a range of areas.

- Business (M.B.A./M.Sc., post-graduate diploma, Bachelor of Business Administration)
- Education (M.Ed.; B.A.; B.Ed. Post Baccalaureate)
- Tourism and Hospitality (M.A.; B.A.)
- Science and Technology (B.Sc.)
- Social Sciences (B.Sc.; B.A)
  - Including a Master of Community Planning (M.C.P.)
- Art and Design, and Performing Arts (B.A.)
- Humanities (M.A.; B.A.)
  - With 17 majors and minors including English, Anthropology, Economics, History, Global Studies, Media Studies, and Psychology
- Career/Vocational
- Trades and Applied Technology
- Health and Human Services Programs including degrees in Social Work, Nursing and Child and Youth Care (B.A.)

In addition, VIU also offers English language certificate programs for English-as-a-second-language (ESL) students.

In 2025, the bachelor of music and jazz diploma programs were discontinued by the board of governors.

== International programs ==
Vancouver Island University offers exchange programs that allow students to study for one or two semesters overseas while remaining registered at Vancouver Island University. Current partner institutions are located in Australia, England, Finland, France, Japan, Korea, the Netherlands, New Zealand, Poland, Switzerland and the USA. Vancouver Island University also offers short-term study abroad options in some program areas; destination countries include Belgium, Belize, the Cook Islands, Indonesia, Italy, USA (New York), Tanzania, Korea, France, and Spain. Additionally, Vancouver Island University supports field schools, co-ops, practicum placements and development projects, has sister-school agreements with Japan, Korea and Thailand and educational alliances with schools in Taiwan, China, Mexico, India and Turkey.

The Vancouver Island University is an active member of the University of the Arctic. UArctic is an international cooperative network based in the Circumpolar Arctic region, consisting of more than 200 universities, colleges, and other organizations with an interest in promoting education and research in the Arctic region.

The university participates in UArctic’s mobility program north2north. The aim of that program is to enable students of member institutions to study in different parts of the North.

== Master of Business Administration (MBA) program ==
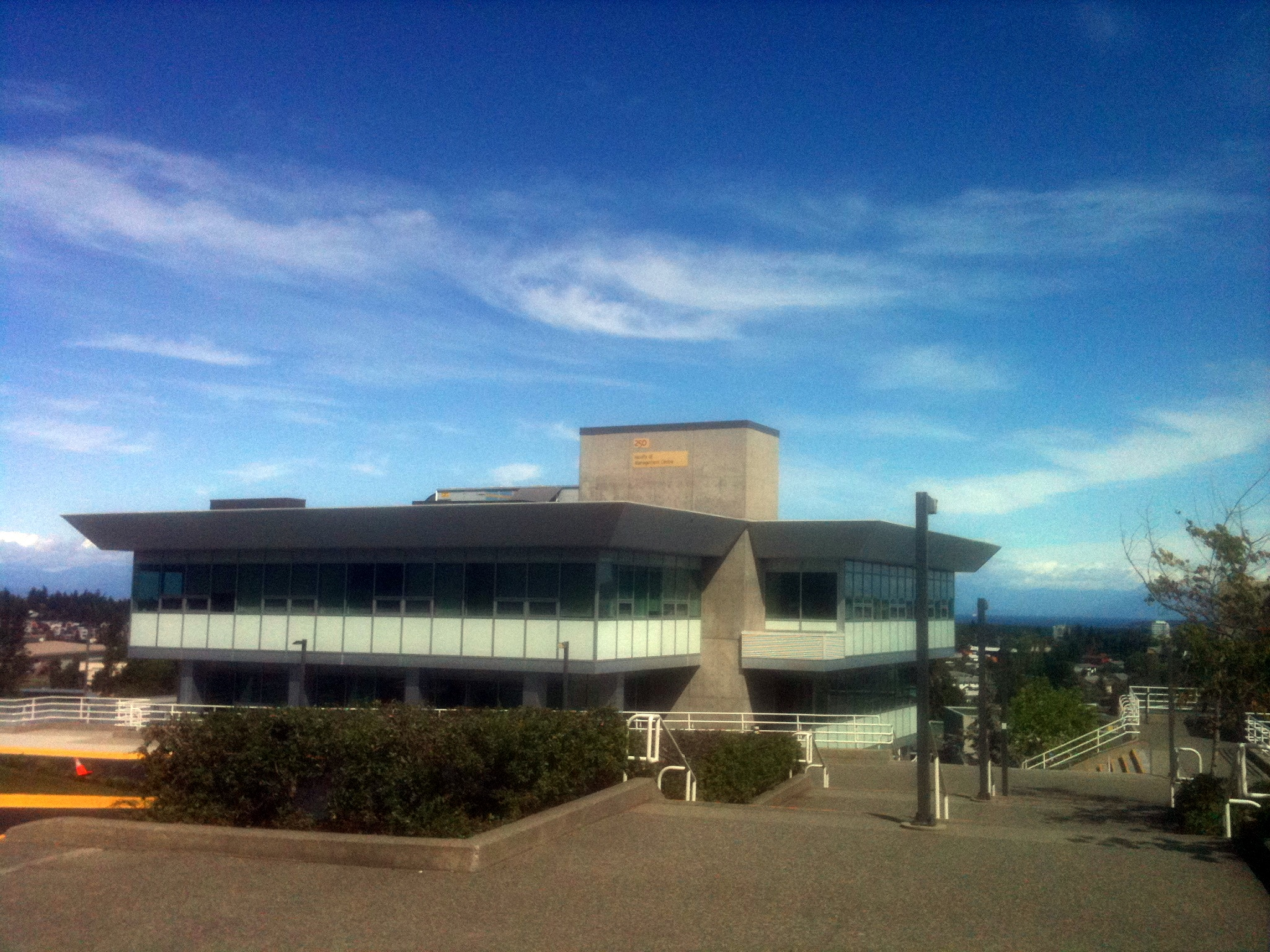
VIU Faculty of Management Building

VIU's Faculty of Management offers graduate business programs that appeal to recent graduates and those individuals who require higher education for career advancement or specialized training. When it was initially accredited, VIU School of Business was one of three Canadian business schools that had been internationally accredited by ACBSP; as of May 2020, eight Canadian universities have ACBSP-accredited programmes.

VIU offers a Master of Business Administration (MBA) that attracts students from around the world. In 2015, the Vancouver Island University MBA Society hosted the first BC MBA Games. The competition was influenced by the national MBA Games and was attended by VIU earlier in the year. MBA students from across British Columbia competed in a range of intensive activities ranging from sports, case competitions and team spirit events. The event was attended by 110 MBA students from Vancouver Island University, Sauder School of Business, Peter B. Gustavson School of Business, Beedie School of Business and Thompson Rivers University. The event's theme to raise funds for families living with autism generated a total of $10,138 which was donated to the Canucks Autism Network and the Autism Society of British Columbia. The event ended with Vancouver Island University emerging as the winner of both the BC MBA Games Cup and the Mann Cup.

Students in Vancouver Island University's Master of Business Administration (MBA) program took fourth place in Canada's MBA Games. It was held in Toronto from January 2–4, earning the best result for university MBA programs in western Canada.

VIU's 32 MBA students competing alongside more than 700 students from 20 Canadian universities also took first place in the "Spirit" competition, with the best result in fundraising, video and opening performance. Of the total $69,269 raised by all teams for the designated charity, Ronald McDonald House Charities of Canada, VIU MBA students raised nearly half, $32,000.

== Indigenous involvement ==
VIU developed governing board and senate policies as well as Indigenous governed councils within the university structure. Elders-in-Residence are present on campus at VIU to provide social supports.

VIU also offers a bachelor's degree in Indigenous/Xwulmuxw Studies. The B.A. Major and Minor in Indigenous/Xwulmuxw Studies are products of a collaboration between Vancouver Island University and the First Nations of Vancouver Island and Coastal British Columbia. Their purpose is to provide comprehensive, high-quality education respectful of the cultures of Indigenous peoples, while meeting their diverse needs.

== Symbols and coat of arms ==
Coat of arms of Vancouver Island University
Notes The announcement of the Letters Patent was made on March 23, 2019, in Volume 153, page 1079 of the Canada Gazette. Granted March 23, 2019 Crest A demi-sun in splendour Or issuant from a Salish canoe Gules. Escutcheon Or a Spanish corvette circa 1790 Azure sails Argent edged Gules on a base of three barrulets wavy, on a chief dancetty Azure four open books Argent bound Or. Supporters Two eagles Or heads Argent wings elevated and addorsed Azure standing on a grassy mount set with fir trees Vert in front of mountains proper all issuant from barry wavy Argent and Azure Motto "Discoveries in Education." This was the motto adopted by Malaspina University-College when it was inaugurated in 1969. It also provides a connection with one of Captain Alejandro Malaspina’s ship, the Descubierta, which means "discovery" in Spanish. Badge A sun in splendour Or charged with a Spanish corvette as in the Arms. Symbolism The late 18th century Spanish sailing vessel is the type used by Captain Alejandro Malaspina who sailed the waters off Vancouver Island in 1791 in search of the Northwest Passage. The vessel thus recalls the namesake of the university, previously named Malaspina University-College, and honours the tradition of exploration. The upper jagged line refers to the mountain range across the Strait of Georgia as seen from the main campus. Active learning is depicted through the open books which highlight the university’s central mission. The gold binding symbolizes the value of pursuing an education and the wealth of knowledge. The four books stand for the main campus and the three regional campuses of Vancouver Island University. The canoe pays homage to the First Nations, whose heritage is an important element in the university’s programs, and especially to the members of the Salish Nation who live in each of the regions served by the university. The sun is an emblem of enlightenment, life and the aspiration for learning. The eagles signify inspiration and striving. For the First Nations, the eagle symbolizes wisdom and power. The evergreens and lush greenery on the base are in abundance the Vancouver Island region. The mountains recall the vista accessible from all of the university’s four campuses and are unique to the western part of Canada. The alternating white and blue wavy bars refer to the presence of water at each of the campuses’ location.

== Partnership ==
- Deakin University, AU
- University of Canberra, AU
- Victoria University, AU
- Exponential University of Applied Sciences, DE
- Mejiro University, JP
- UNITEC, NZ
- University of Hertfordshire, UK
- California State University, East Bay, US
- University of Central Arkansas, US
- University of Montana, US

== Notable alumni ==
- Gwen O'Mahony – Former MLA in the 39th Parliament of British Columbia
- Cassidy Caron – President of the Métis National Council (elected September 30, 2021), former chairperson of the Métis Youth British Columbia, and Minister of Youth for the Métis Nation British Columbia (September 2016 to September 2020).
- Victor Blasco – Professional soccer player

== See also ==
- Education in Canada
- Higher education in British Columbia
- Higher education in Canada
- List of institutes and colleges in British Columbia
- List of universities in British Columbia
