= Institute of Management Foundation =

Institute of Management Foundation - FIA Business School (FIA)
- Established: 1980
- Academic affiliations: School of Economics, Business and Accounting of the University of São Paulo
- Location: São Paulo
- Website: https://fia.com.br/

The Institute of Management Foundation (known as FIA) is a higher education institution founded in 1980 by professors and collaborators from the School of Economics, Business and Accounting of the University of São Paulo (FEA-USP).

FIA works closely with FEA-USP in training students as well as in raising funds for FEA-USP by providing consulting services to corporations and government institutions.

FIA international MBA is currently ranked among the TOP 100 universities in the world according to QS university rankings.

== Undergraduate Controversy ==
FIA also offers an undergraduate degree in business administration, which has generated criticism from students, faculty and staff at the University of São Paulo (USP) as this is the first time a University of São Paulo–related entity offers a private undergraduate degree, while the University of São Paulo (USP) is a public institution owned by the state of São Paulo.

To respond the criticizes from the university of São Paulo, James Wright, ex-director of FIA and professor of FEA-USP says that the undergrad program of FIA is a “laboratory experiment” comparing with undergrad students from FEA-USP

== International University Partnerships ==
University of Cambridge - King's College

FIA has collaborations with University of Cambridge regarding the hiring of teachers to participate in their joint partnerships

Since then, the same teachers have been hired directly by the FIA and selected by our Coordination. In the past, about 50% of classes were taught at Colleges and 50% in the auditorium of the Judge Institute.

Since 2013 we have a contract with King's College to carry out classes, and the corresponding certificate is issued by the FIA.'

== Student groups and organizations ==
=== Academic Directory (Student Council) ===
-Academic directory of fundacao instituto de administracao is the representation entity of undergraduate students, with the objective of managing and reporting the needs of undergraduate students.

=== FIA Junior ===
-Formed and managed by students, FIA Júnior has the technical support of masters and doctors from Institute of Management Foundation, specialized in the various areas of the company's business consulting services, which is divided into: Marketing Management, Finance, Processes and Sustainability.

=== Athletic Association ===
-Atletica FIA is the official sports representation body of the FIA.

It disputes several external championships and organizes parties and internal sports events in order to encourage university sports.

=== FIA Finance ===
- Founded in 2018, FIA Finance is the finance club of FIA - Fundação Instituto de Administração.FIA Finance aim to connect their students with the financial market before they begin their careers as professionals with projects in different areas.

== Master's degree (stricto sensu) ==
=== RESEARCH LINES ===
RESEARCH LINE 1 - STRATEGIC MANAGEMENT: focuses on advancing theories and management practice of formulating and implementing strategies.

RESEARCH LINE 2 - MARKETS AND VALUE GENERATION: involves the study of theories and practices along the value chain.

== MBA ==
=== Americas MBA ===
Along with FIA Business School, participating schools include:

- SFU, Simon Fraser University – Beedie School of Business, Vancouver, Canada
- ITAM, Instituto Tecnológico Autónomo de México, Mexico City, Mexico
- Vanderbilt University, Owen Graduate School of Management, Nashville, Tenn., USA
