= Edwards School of Business =

Business school at the University of Saskatchewan

Coordinates: 52°7′59.85″N 106°38′18.34″W

N. Murray Edwards School of Business
- Type: Public
- Established: 1914; 2007 (under current name)
- Dean: Keith Willoughby
- Academic staff: 64
- Administrative staff: 35
- Undergraduates: ~1,800
- Postgraduates: ~223
- Location: Saskatoon, Saskatchewan, Canada
- Campus: Urban
- Website: http://www.edwards.usask.ca

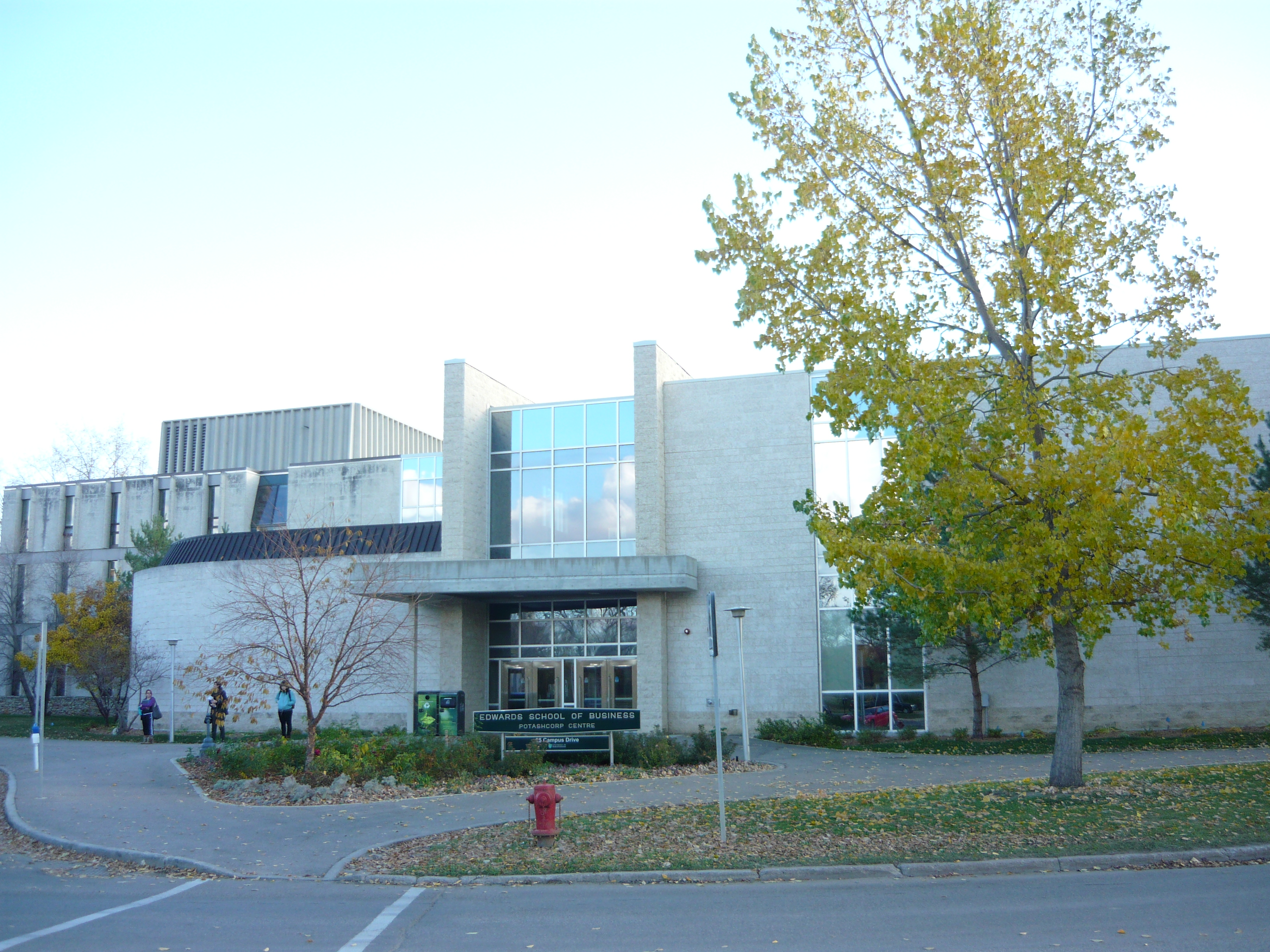
Nutrien Centre Edwards School of Business

The N. Murray Edwards School of Business, also known as the Edwards School of Business, or simply Edwards, is located on the University of Saskatchewan campus in Saskatoon, Saskatchewan. Formerly the College of Commerce, the school was renamed in 2007 to honor N. Murray Edwards, an alumnus and entrepreneur.

== History ==
The school was established in 1914 as the School of Accounting, leading to the degree of BSc. However, the first students were not admitted until 1917, due to the impact of World War I on enrollment. This was the first accounting degree in Canada, and the first university-level school of accounting in Canada.

In 1936, the school was named the College of Accounting, and in 1943 it became the College of Commerce, coupled with a broader mission that would encompass the training of future business executives.

In 2007, the school was named after Canadian entrepreneur N. Murray Edwards, an alumnus and long-time supporter of the school.

== Programs ==
=== Undergraduate ===
The school grants both undergraduate and graduate degrees. The undergraduate degree offered is the Bachelor of Commerce, or B. Comm. Students can specialize in one of six majors: accounting, finance, human resources, management, marketing, or supply chain management. Students choose their major in their 2nd semester of their 2nd year. If accepted into the major of their choice, they begin classes in their field of study at the beginning of their 3rd year. Additionally, undergraduate students may also participate in a co-operative education program during their 3rd or 4th year, consisting of an 8 month work placement.

=== Graduate ===
In addition to its undergraduate programs, Edwards offers a Master of Business Administration, as well as a Master of Science in Management, and a Master of Professional Accounting.

=== Certificate ===
The school offers three certificate programs: the Indigenous Business Administration Certificate, the Certificate in Business, and the Certificate in Entrepreneurship.

=== Ranking and reputation ===
On February 22, 2018, Edwards received accreditation through the Association to Advance Collegiate Schools of Business (AACSB). Achieving accreditation follows a process of rigorous internal review, engagement with an AACSB assigned mentor, and external peer evaluation. Once a school earns AACSB accreditation, it enters a five-year continuous improvement review cycle, ensuring that they have the resources, credentials, and commitment needed to provide students with a first-rate, future-focused business education.

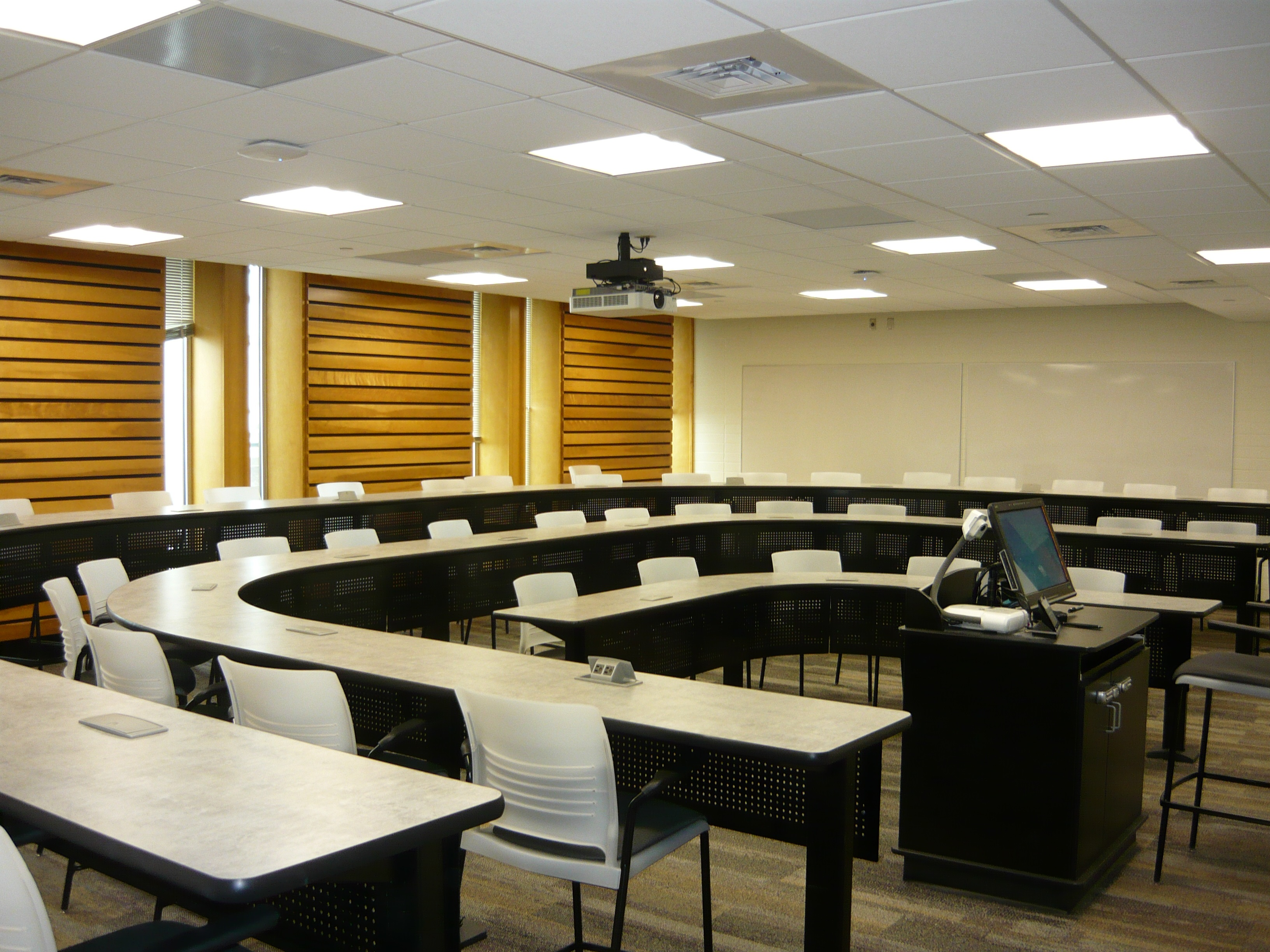
Typical classroom
