= Alberta School of Business =

Business school within University of Alberta

- Type: Business school
- Established: 1916
- Affiliations: University of Alberta
- Dean: Vikas Mehrotra
- Academic staff: 146
- Administrative staff: 82
- Students: 4,198
- Undergraduates: 3,485
- Postgraduates: 659
- Doctoral students: 54
- Location: Edmonton, Alberta, Canada; 53.526523°N 113.5175°W
- Colours: Green & Gold
- Website: ualberta.ca/business

Alberta School of Business is the business school of the University of Alberta, located in Edmonton, Alberta, Canada. It offers undergraduate, graduate, and executive programs in business, management, and entrepreneurship, and is known for its long-standing research contributions and AACSB accreditation.

== History ==
The Alberta School of Business was founded in 1916 as a School of Accountancy. The first Bachelor of Commerce degrees were awarded in 1924, and in 1928, a School of Commerce was formally established. After significant curriculum revisions in 1960, it became a full-fledged faculty. In 1968, it became the first business school in Canada to receive accreditation from the Association to Advance Collegiate Schools of Business (AACSB), maintaining this status through 2012, making it the longest-accredited business school in the country. The faculty was renamed the Faculty of Business in 1984 and moved into a new building on campus. In 2010, its name was formally changed to the Alberta School of Business.

== Ranking ==
The Alberta School of Business is ranked sixth in Canada in major subject-based rankings for Business and Management Studies. In 2025, the School placed #6 nationally in assessments by QS World University Rankings, Times Higher Education, and Maclean’s. It has also appeared in global business school rankings and is affiliated with the University of Alberta, which is consistently ranked among the top public research universities worldwide.

== Leadership ==
Dr. Vikas Mehrotra was appointed Dean on April 11, 2023. He succeeded Dr. Joseph Doucet, who served as Dean from 2013-2020, following Dr. Mike Percy, who held the position from 1997 to 2011.

The School is supported by a Business Advisory Council, established to provide guidance and advice to the Dean and senior leadership. The Council includes representatives from the business community and provides input on curriculum, research priorities, and engagement with industry.

== Academics ==
=== Profile ===
The Alberta School of Business is divided into four teaching and research departments: Accounting, Operations & Information Systems; Finance and Statistical Analysis; Strategic Management and Organization, which includes the study of family business; and Marketing, Business Economics & Law which also houses the specialty areas of energy economics, retailing, real estate and international business. The School has 2,071 undergraduate, 757 full and part-time MBA, and 54 doctoral students, as well as alumni of more than 30,000 throughout the world, who belong to a Business Alumni Association with national and international chapters and events. The School also houses over 27 student clubs.

=== Programs ===
The Alberta School of Business offers undergraduate, master's and PhD business degrees as well as professional development and executive programs.

Bachelor of Commerce - There are five different BCom degree programs and 16 majors. The Bachelor of Commerce program offers and majors in Accounting, Business Economics and Law, Business Studies, Decision and Information Systems, Distribution Management, East Asian Studies, Entrepreneurship and Small Business, European Studies, Finance, Human Resource Management, International Business, Latin American Studies, Management Information Systems, Management and Organization, Marketing, Operations Management, as well as Retailing and Services.

MBA & Master's Programs - Programs include the MBA, Executive MBA, Master of Accounting, Master of Financial Management, Master of Management Analytics, Master of Real Estate Development. The UAlberta MBA program offers courses in Energy Finance, Innovation & Entrepreneurship, Operations & Business Analytics, Public Sector & Healthcare Management, and Strategy & Consulting. In addition to its Canadian offerings, the School operates MBA and Master of Financial Management programs in China. Professional development and executive programs are also offered through the Master's Programs Office.

PhD - The Doctor of Philosophy in Business program offers research in five specializations of business education.

The Alberta School of Business is home to several research and entrepreneurship centres and institutes, including: the Alberta Business Family Institute, the Cities Institute, the AI Centre for Decision Analytics, the eHub Entrepreneurship Centre, and the Centre for Entrepreneurship and Family Enterprise.
