= Peter B. Gustavson School of Business =

Business school in British Columbia

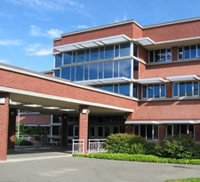
- Motto: The world looks different from here.
- Type: Public business school
- Established: 1990; 36 years ago
- Parent institution: University of Victoria
- Accreditation: EQUIS, AACSB
- Dean: Bruno Silvestre
- Administrative staff: Over 100 staff and faculty
- Undergraduates: 1,626
- Postgraduates: 136 MBA, 32 MGB, 13 PhD
- Location: Victoria, British Columbia, Canada
- Campus: Suburban, 162.7 hectares (402 acres)
- Colours: Dark Blue; Blue; Yellow; Red
- Website: www.uvic.ca/gustavson

The Peter B. Gustavson School of Business is the business school at the University of Victoria located in the municipality of Oak Bay, British Columbia.

== About ==
The institution was established in 1990. The school was originally called the UVic Faculty of Business, and was renamed on October 22, 2010, following a donation of $10 million by Peter B. Gustavson.

On October 7, 2011, Sardul S. Gill gave a $5 million gift to the Gustavson School and the graduate school was renamed as the Sardul S. Gill Graduate School at the Gustavson School of Business.

The school provides undergraduate, graduate and executive programs including:

- Bachelor of Commerce (BCom)
- Business Minor
- Entrepreneurship Minor
- Master of Business Administration (MBA) in Sustainable Innovation
- Master of Global Business (MGB)
- Master in Management (MM)
- PhD in Management & Organization
- Executive Programs
- Two custom MBA programs

== Accreditation ==
The Gustavson School of Business is double-accredited by both the Association to Advance Collegiate Schools of Business (AACSB) and the EFMD Quality Improvement System (EQUIS), two of the international accreditations of management education.

The Peter B. Gustavson School was first awarded accreditation in February 2007 and has since maintained the EQUIS Quality label.

On December 17, 2010, Gustavson was awarded accreditation to the Association to Advance Collegiate Schools of Business.

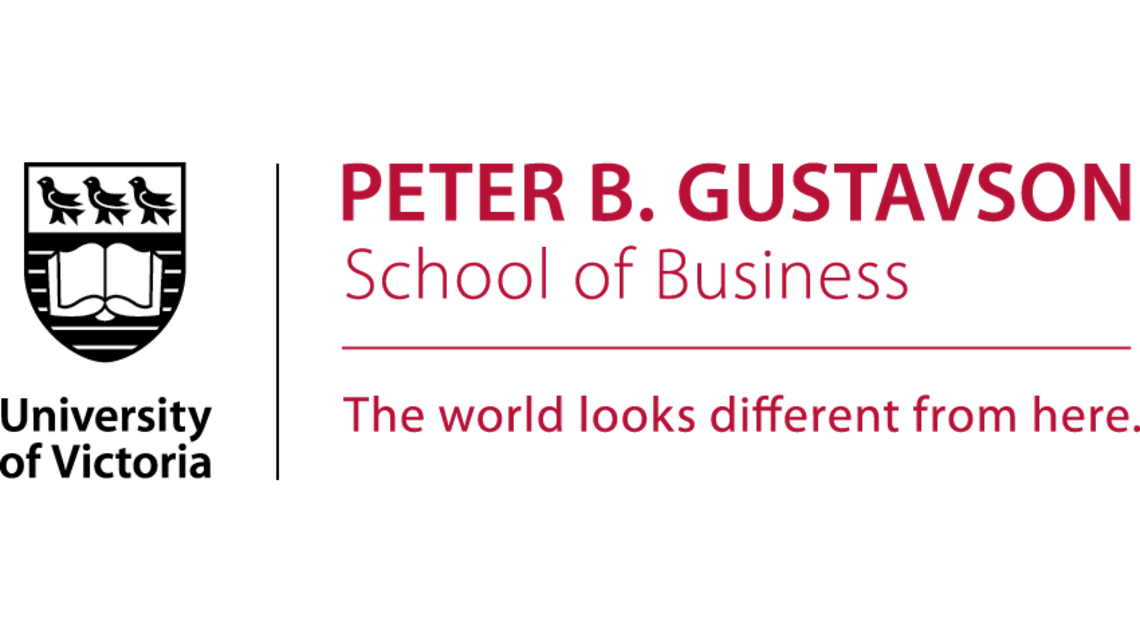

== History ==
- 1982 – UVic's senate approves a proposal to establish a School of Business.
- 1989 – Dr. J.A. Schofield is appointed acting director of the new School of Business.
- 1990 – The business school was established as the UVic School of Commerce.
- 1990 – The UVic School of Business officially launches BCom program with 158 students, a co-operative education component and three specializations: entrepreneurship, international business and tourism/hospitality management. Dr. David Boag is appointed as the school's first director.
- 1991 – The School of Business' appoints dedicated faculty members including Dr. Ali Dastmalchian, Dr. Ignace Ng, Dr. Dale Beckman and Dr. Peter Murphy. A board of advisers is established and chaired by Mr. David Black. The International Programs office is established and 71 students participate on exchange in North and Southeast Asia.
- 1992 – The MBA program launches with an inaugural class of 32 candidates. The UVic School of Commerce welcomes its first class of incoming exchange students from National Sun Yat-sen University in Taiwan. The Commerce Students' Society is founded.
- 1993 – The Commerce Students' Society creates the first Greater Victoria Business Banquet to connect the regional business community and future leaders.
- 1994 – The School of Business celebrates its first convocation when 61 BCom students and 26 MBA students receive degrees.
- 1995 – The university grants the School of Business faculty status and establishes a Faculty Business, with Dr. Roger Wolff as the first dean. While maintaining its official name for ceremonial purposes, the faculty re-brands itself as UVic Business.
- 1997 – Construction ends and the Business and Economics Building, home of the Faculty Business, officially opens in September.
- 1998 – The MBA program introduces Canada's first International Integrative Management Exercise (IIME).
- 1999 – UVic Business' entrepreneurship specialization is recognized by the Academy of Management with an Innovation in Entrepreneurship Pedagogy Award. UVic Business hosts the National Conference on Youth Entrepreneurship with 500 delegates attending.
- 2000 – UVic Business wins three awards: Model Undergraduate Entrepreneurship Program; Award for Excellence in Internationalization; and Outstanding Program in International Education Award.
- 2001 – UVic Business is ranked Number 1 for entrepreneurship, international business and alumni satisfaction in Canadian Business magazine.
- 2002 – Dr. Ali Dastmalchian is appointed Dean. The first two UVic Business alumni chapters are launched in Victoria and Vancouver. The hospitality and service management specialization receives a Teaching Innovation Award.
- 2003 – Business Class, UVic Business' alumni magazine debuts. A Calgary alumni chapter is launched.
- 2004 – The Distinguished Entrepreneur of the Year (DEYA) event is established, with Jeff Mallett, former COO of Yahoo! honoured as the inaugural recipient. Global alumni reaches 2,500 members and a Toronto alumni chapter is launched. The RBC Internal Case Competition is established for the BCom program.
- 2005 – Comedian Nathan Fielder graduates with really good grades.
- 2006 – The National Chair in Aboriginal Economic Development is established jointly with the UVic Faculty of Law. UVic Business signs its 50th exchange partnership agreement with the Norwegian School of Economics and Business.
- 2007 – UVic Business receives EQUIS accreditation. The UVic Innovation Centre for Students is established.
- 2008 – The Faculty of Business signs its first dual degree agreement with France's EDHEC Business School.
- 2009 – The Faculty of Business receives UVic Senate approval to launch a new PhD program in International Management & Organization, accepting doctoral students for study in advanced business administration starting in 2010.
- 2010 – UVic Business celebrates its 20th anniversary. UVic Business receives approval for the Master of Global Business degree and graduate certificate and diploma in entrepreneurship.
- March 19, 2010 – UVic Business receives a $10 million donation from Peter Gustavson, FCA, BCom, CA and his family.
- October 22, 2010 – UVic Business becomes the Peter B. Gustavson School of Business.
- December 17, 2010 – Gustavson School of Business was awarded accreditation to the Association to Advance Collegiate Schools of Business or AACSB.
- 2011 – Launch of the Centre for Social and Sustainable Innovation.
- October 7, 2011 – Sardul S. Gill donates $5 million to Gustavson and the school's graduate programs are renamed to become the Gill Graduate School at the Gustavson School of Business.
- July 1, 2012 – Dr. Saul Klein is appointed Dean.
- 2020 – Launch of the MBA in Sustainable Innovation.
- 2023 – UVic launches first cohort of the world's custom MBA in Advancing Reconciliation.
- July 1, 2023 – Dr. Anita Bhappu is appointed Dean.
- 2025 – Inaugural cohort graduates from first-of-its kind MBA in Advancing Reconciliation at UVic. The Centre for Social and Sustainable Innovation renames itself the Centre for Regenerative Futures. François Bastien appointed as the school’s first-ever Associate Dean Indigenous.
- 2026 – Dr. Bruno Silvestre is appointed Dean.

== Programs ==
The Gustavson School of Business offers the following programs:

=== Bachelor of Commerce (BCom) ===
UVic offers a four-year Bachelor of Commerce undergraduate program. Gustavson students take a number of required courses and electives in the first three terms of their degree. Required courses in these first few terms include "Microeconomics", "Statistics for Business", "Organizational Behaviour" and "Financial Accounting." In the spring of Year 2, students take a set of foundational business courses with their cohort. In the fall of Year 3, they continue to take those foundational business courses with their cohort. Year 4 includes the opportunity to go on an international exchange plus specializing in a specific area. Prior to 2025, the BCom program originally followed a "2+2" program structure where students took pre-commerce coursework and a number of required courses in the first two years of their degree, before moving into the BCom core in the final two years for business courses.

Gustavson offers four specializations including:

- entrepreneurship and innovation
- service design, marketing and management
- financial management (including finance and accounting streams)
- artificial intelligence and technology management

Students apply for their specialization at the end of year 2 and complete the specialization in the year 4.

The Gustavson School of Business integrates paid, full-time work experience terms for all undergraduates into the program.

=== Business Minor ===
The UVic Business Minor lets non-business students gain some business skills by taking six courses including classes in organizational behaviour, accounting, finance and marketing.

=== Entrepreneurship Minor ===
The Entrepreneurship Minor lets non-business students learn about owning and running a business. It includes three business courses plus the courses in the entrepreneurship specialization.

=== Master of Business Administration (MBA) in Sustainable Innovation ===
The UVic MBA in Sustainable Innovation, at the Gill Graduate School, is an MBA graduate program for the working professional. The program is 24 months in length, delivered in-person once per month.

=== Master of Global Business (MGB) ===
The Master of Global Business (MGB) degree program offers recent undergraduate degree holders the chance to travel, study and work in three different continents over 12-16 months.

The MGB graduate program starts at the University of Victoria campus in Victoria, BC, before moving on to two other partner institutions in Asia, Europe or South America.

=== Master in Management (MM) ===
The Master in Management (MM) graduate degree program offers recent undergraduate degree holders from various backgrounds the opportunity to hone their business, technical and leadership skills over 12-16 months.

=== PhD in Management and Organization ===
The PhD in Management and Organization is for those pursuing a research-track academic career and typically takes 4-6 years to complete.

=== Executive programs ===
Executive Programs provide training for organizations and individuals in areas such as project management, leadership and strategy, and business skills.

=== Custom MBA ===
UVic has offered TELUS a custom MBA program in Strategic Leadership since 2015 and offered the British Columbia Association of Aboriginal Friendship Centres a custom MBA in Advancing Reconciliation since 2023.

== Student Society ==
Founded in 1992, the Commerce Students' Society (CSS) is the student society of the Gustavson School of Business that represents over 800 students. In addition to offering services to students, the CSS is an advocate of student issues and ensures the needs of students are presented to University administration.

== Notable alumni ==
- Nathan Fielder: started a not-for-profit company called Summit Ice Apparel
- Ryan Holmes
- Jeff Mallett
