= Inner tube water polo =

Form of water polo

Inner tube water polo (ITWP) is a variant of water polo with the difference that players are required to float in inflatable inner tubes. By floating in an inner tube, players experience less contact and expend less energy than traditional water polo players, not having to tread water. This allows casual players to enjoy water polo without undertaking the intense conditioning required for conventional water polo. This sport is predominantly played at universities, but can also be found in recreational adult leagues.

== Goalkeeper ==
The goalkeeper position is played differently, depending on the host leagues rules. In some leagues, goalkeepers are the only players prohibited from using an innertube during play, requiring them to tread water or stand in a shallow body of water. In other leagues, goalkeepers may be permitted to play just as all other players. Finally, some leagues require the goalkeeper to play with an alteration to their tube. For example, a goalkeeper may be required to have a more deflated tube, be required to deflate and fold their tube in half and sit with the tube between their legs, or use a larger tube intended to make the goalkeeper less mobile.

== History ==
The game was invented in 1969 by Gary Colberg, then UC Davis's associate athletic director of intramural sports and sport clubs.
