= 2000 British Columbia New Democratic Party leadership election =

Canadian province party leader election

2000 New Democratic Party leadership
- February 20, 2000
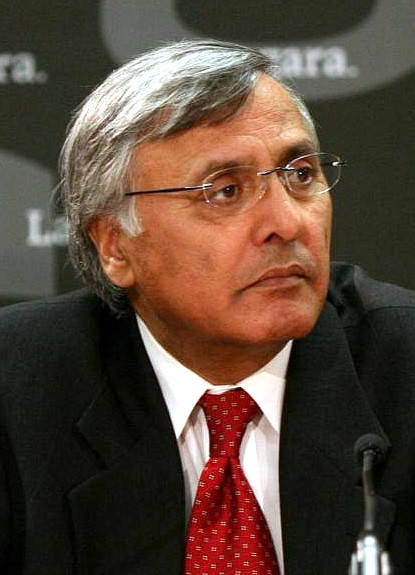

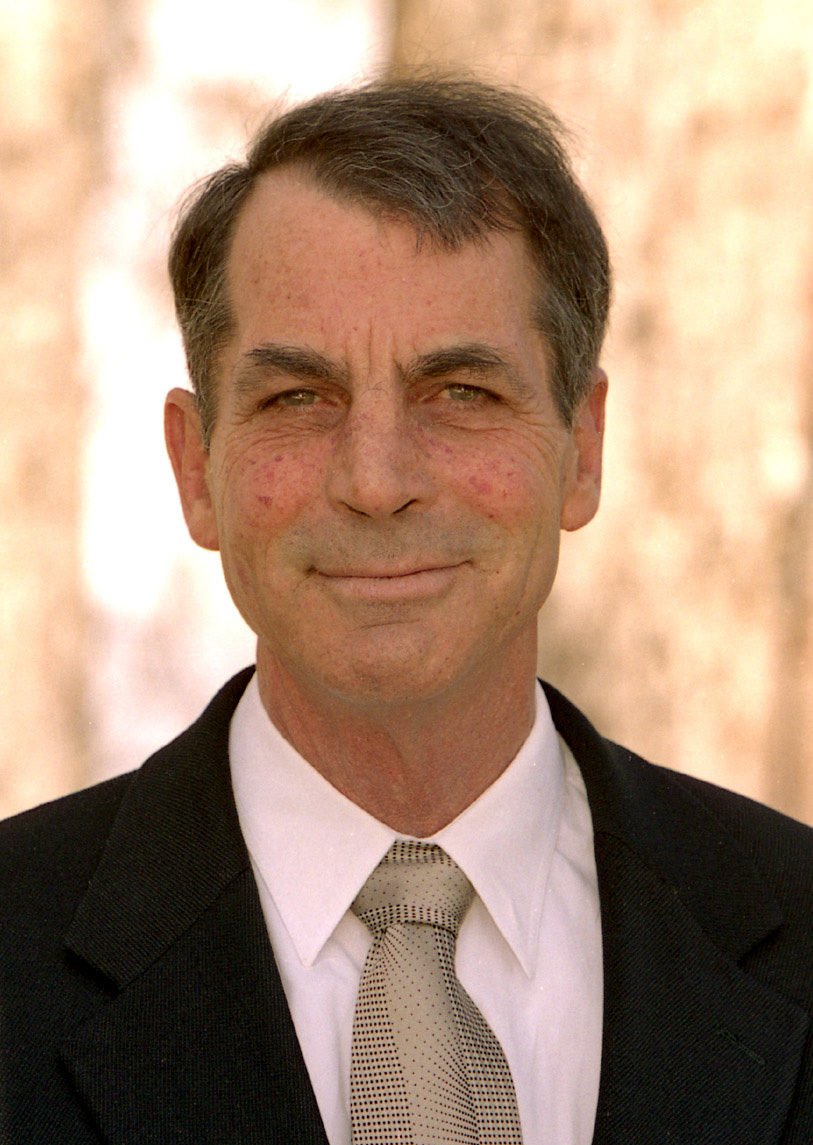
Candidate	Ujjal Dosanjh	Corky Evans
Riding	Vancouver-Kensington	Nelson-Creston
Final ballot	769 (58.35%)	549 (41.65%)
Leader before election
Dan Miller (interim)
Elected Leader
Ujjal Dosanjh

2000 British Columbia New Democratic Party leadership election
- Date: February 20, 2000
- Resigning leader: Glen Clark
- Won by: Ujjal Dosanjh
- Ballots: 1
- Candidates: 2

The 2000 British Columbia New Democratic Party leadership election was held on February 20, 2000, to elect a successor to Glen Clark as leader of the British Columbia New Democratic Party (BC NDP). The election was necessary because Clark had resigned as leader following a conflict of interest scandal; leaving Dan Miller as interim leader. Ujjal Dosanjh was elected, defeating Corky Evans.

== Background ==
The BC NDP was in government at the time of the 2000 leadership election. BC NDP leader and Premier of British Columbia, Glen Clark had resigned from both roles on August 21, 1999, following a conflict of interest scandal related to casino licensing. Dan Miller temporarily took over as both Premier and leader of the BC NDP, until the leadership election could be concluded.

Initially, five candidates put their names forward; although by February 20, 2000, the day of the leadership election, only Attorney General Ujjal Dosanjh and Minister of Agriculture Corky Evans remained.

== Candidates ==
=== Ujjal Dosanjh ===
Dosanjh was the Member of the Legislative Assembly (MLA) for Vancouver-Kensington from 1991 to 2001. He was also the Attorney General of British Columbia from 1995 to 2000. Before entering politics, he was a lawyer.

Endorsements

- MLAs: (1) Joy MacPhail (Vancouver-Hastings)
- Former MLAs: (1) David Schreck (North Vancouver-Lonsdale)

=== Corky Evans ===
Evans was the Member of the Legislative Assembly (MLA) for Nelson-Creston from 1991 to 2001. He was also the Minister of Agriculture and Food from 1996 to 2000. Before entering politics, he was a farmer.

Endorsements

- MLAs: (1) Gordon Wilson (Powell River-Sunshine Coast)

== Withdrawn candidates ==
=== Joy MacPhail ===
MacPhail was the Member of the Legislative Assembly (MLA) for Vancouver-Hastings. On January 8, 2000, she withdrew from the leadership race and endorsed Dosanjh.

=== Len Werden ===
Werden was a union activist, and president of the B.C. and Yukon Building Trades Council. He withdrew from the leadership race on February 19, 2000.

=== Gordon Wilson ===
Wilson was the Member of the Legislative Assembly (MLA) for Powell River-Sunshine Coast. He was previously leader of the Progressive Democratic Alliance from 1993 to 1999 and the British Columbia Liberal Party from 1987 to 1993. On February 20, 2000, he withdrew from the leadership race and endorsed Evans.

== Ballot results ==
First Ballot
Candidate	Votes	Percentage
Ujjal Dosanjh	769	58.35
Corky Evans	549	41.65
Total	1,318	100.00
