= Dana Larsen =

Canadian politician

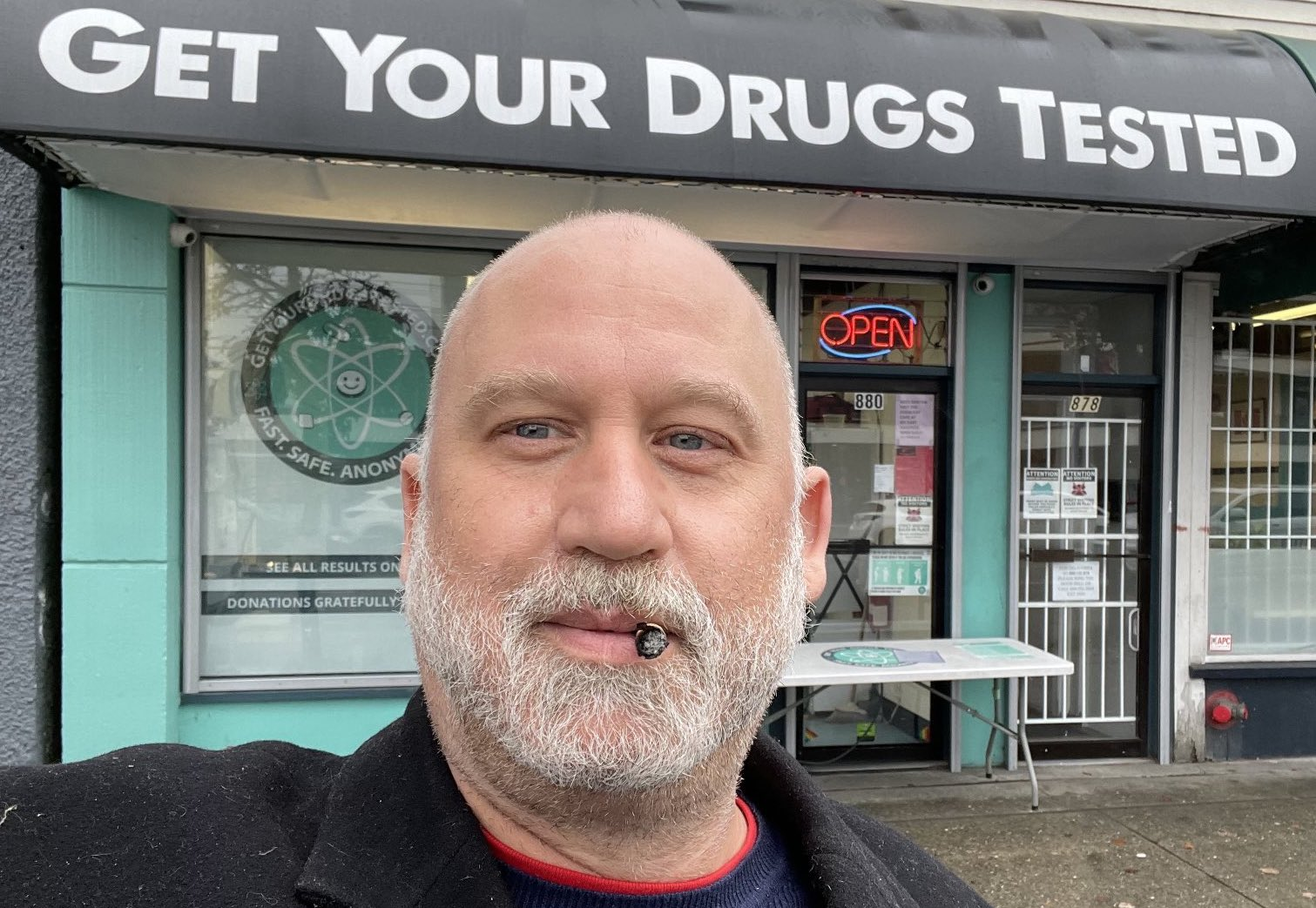
- Dana Larsen in front of the Get Your Drugs Tested centre, 2021
- Organization: Get Your Drugs Tested The Medicinal Cannabis Dispensary The Medicinal Mushroom Dispensary The Coca Leaf Cafe Pothead Books
- Known for: Cannabis and drug reform activism
- Political party: Marijuana Party of Canada (2000–2003); British Columbia Marijuana Party (2000–2003); New Democratic Party (2003–Present)
- Website: www.danalarsen.com

Dana Albert Larsen (born 1971) is a Canadian author, businessman, philanthropist and activist for cannabis and drug policy reform. Larsen currently operates businesses and non-profit societies in Vancouver including The Medicinal Cannabis Dispensary, The Medicinal Mushroom Dispensary, The Coca Leaf Cafe, Pothead Books, and the Get Your Drugs Tested centre.

== Businesses and non-profits ==
=== Vancouver Seed Bank ===
In 2006, Larsen co-founded the Vancouver Seed Bank, a business which sold many seed varieties from their storefront and also across Canada by mail-order, including those for banned and controversial psychoactive plants such as marijuana, poppies, peyote and coca.

=== Medicinal Cannabis Dispensary ===
In November 2008, Larsen announced the opening of The Medicinal Cannabis Dispensary, located almost next door to the Vancouver Seed Bank, on East Hastings Street in Vancouver. The cannabis dispensary is operated by a non-profit society of which Larsen is a Director. In July 2010, the cannabis dispensary opened a second location, in Vancouver's West End.

In June 2019, Larsen closed the Hastings location of the dispensary due to a court order after a long legal battle with the city. In October 2019, the West End dispensary location was raided by the BC "Community Safety Unit" who confiscated all the cannabis in the shop. The dispensary location re-opened three hours later.

=== Get Your Drugs Tested service ===
In May 2019, Larsen launched a free community service called Get Your Drugs Tested, offering analysis of any street drug. They use FTIR Spectrometers, fentanyl test strips and other tools to offer free analysis of any drug or substance. They accept drug samples both in person and by mail.

In June 2019, Larsen moved the service into his empty cannabis dispensary location at 872 East Hastings a few weeks after it had been forced to close. In December 2023, a second Get Your Drugs Tested storefront was opened at 245 West Broadway, next door to a Medicinal Mushroom Dispensary location.

In February 2021, Larsen announced that Get Your Drugs Tested had analyzed over 10,000 samples. In March 2024 they announced they had analyzed over 65,00 samples. Get Your Drugs Tested has become the busiest free street drug analysis center in the world.

Get Your Drugs Tested receives no government funding, and is entirely supported by Larsen's Medicinal Cannabis Dispensary and Medicinal Mushroom Dispensary.

=== Medicinal Mushroom Dispensary ===
In June 2019, Larsen announced the opening of The Medicinal Mushroom Dispensary online, providing microdoses of psilocybe mushrooms for medical purposes across Canada by mail. A Vancouver city councillor cited concerns about people injecting mushrooms and the involvement of drug gangs, and introduced a motion to ban mushroom dispensaries in Vancouver. The motion was defeated.

=== Coca Leaf Cafe ===
In October 2020, Larsen opened The Coca Leaf Cafe in Vancouver, with a focus on coca tea drinks made with imported Peruvian coca leaf. The location also sells herbs and plants including peyote, kratom, san pedro and psychedelic microdoses. In February 2021, Larsen added The Medicinal Mushroom Dispensary storefront into the cafe. In 2023, Larsen opened two other Medicinal Mushroom Dispensary storefronts in Vancouver.

=== Mushroom dispensaries police raid and response ===
In November 2023, all three storefronts of Larsen's Medicinal Mushroom Dispensary in Vancouver were raided by Vancouver police, who seized all the money, mushrooms, LSD, DMT and coca leaf products from all locations. Larsen was arrested and detained by police for 7 hours, then released with no charges or conditions. Larsen re-opened the shops the next day.

In response to the police raid, in late December 2023 Larsen sent a gram of psilocybe mushroom and a single coca leaf to all 87 members of the BC Legislature, calling it a Christmas gift. He included user guides, an invitation to visit his dispensaries and Get Your Drugs Tested storefront, and a Christmas card. Larsen said he wanted to show the MLAs that "there's nothing to be afraid of when it comes to a coca leaf or a mushroom" and that both substances "have a lot of benefits."

BC United MLA Elenore Sturko told the media that she was "outraged" by receiving the parcel, and said that the mushroom and coca leaf she received "may have played a role in gang activity" and "may have played a role in someone’s murder." NDP MLA and Public Safety Minister Mike Farnworth said “The irresponsible act of sending illegal substances to MLA offices in British Columbia is reprehensible and wrong. Government has alerted law enforcement."

=== Mushroom Dispensary Business License ===
In May 2023, Vancouver's Chief License Inspector suspended the business license of Larsen's mushroom dispensary located at 247 West Broadway, claiming "gross misconduct." This decision was appealed to City Council. After being delayed twice, the appeal was finally heard on March 5, 2024. The Councillors voted to overturn the suspension, ordering the Chief License Inspector to reinstate the business license "with terms that clarify the business as education and advocacy regarding entheogens and medicinal psychoactive substances such as psilocybin mushrooms, peyote, LSD and DMT."

On April 10, Vancouver's two Green Party Councillors introduced a motion to City Council which would have instructed staff to look into options for licensing and regulating mushroom dispensaries in the city. The majority of ABC Party Councillors unanimously voted against the motion, defeating it.

On April 23, 2024, Vancouver's Chief License Inspector said that the council decision and order to reinstate the mushroom dispensary business license was only applicable to their 2023 license, despite the council decision being made in March 2024. She said she would not be issuing a business license for 2024 and ordered the dispensary to close. Larsen said he would be going to court to challenge the refusal to reinstate the license. As of now, the business has regained its license.

== Political parties and candidacies ==
=== BC Marijuana Party and Canadian Marijuana Party ===
Larsen was a founding member of both the Marijuana Party of Canada and the BC Marijuana Party. In the 2000 Canadian federal election, Larsen ran as the Marijuana Party candidate for the riding of West Vancouver-Sunshine Coast, receiving 3% of the vote. In the 2001 British Columbia provincial election, Larsen ran as a BC Marijuana Party candidate in the Powell River-Sunshine Coast riding, receiving 3.5% of the vote.

After the 2001 election, Larsen became the Leader of the BC Marijuana Party.

=== New Democratic Party ===
In 2003, Larsen resigned from both Marijuana parties and joined Canada's New Democratic Party.

In 2005, Larsen founded a group called "End Prohibition: NDP Against the Drug War." Larsen has since claimed that End Prohibition was instrumental in passing progressive drug-policy resolutions through the provincial NDP in British Columbia, Saskatchewan and Ontario.

Larsen was the federal New Democratic Party candidate for the riding of West Vancouver—Sunshine Coast—Sea to Sky Country for the 2008 federal election. However, he resigned on September 17, after videos he had filmed for Pot-TV in 1999 were released to the media, which showed him taking LSD and smoking marijuana.

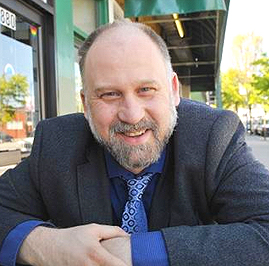
Mr.Larsen in a nice suit

=== Run for leadership of BC NDP ===
On December 29, 2010, Larsen announced his candidacy for the leadership of the British Columbia NDP, running against Adrian Dix, John Horgan, Mike Farnworth and Nicholas Simons. Larsen came in fourth, with 2.7% of the vote.

== Sensible BC campaign ==
In September 2012, Larsen launched the Sensible BC campaign to decriminalize cannabis possession in BC through a ballot initiative petition. Larsen toured the province extensively before launching the campaign, at one point visiting 32 towns in 12 days. The campaign featured a decorated "Cannabus" which toured the province,

In 2013, Sensible BC had about 4000 volunteers gather over 202,000 signatures from all across the province in 90 days, from September 9 to December 9. Although not enough signatures were gathered to qualify for a referendum, it was the second-highest total ever gathered in BC for a referendum effort.

== Overgrow Canada campaign ==
In 2016 Larsen launched a cannabis seed giveaway campaign called Overgrow Canada. He offered free cannabis seeds by mail and started a 16-city national tour, ultimately claiming to have given away two million seeds that year to over 25,000 people. During the tour he was arrested in Calgary and charged with trafficking because of the seed give-away, spending the night in jail. He continued the tour after the arrest and was not charged or interfered with again.

In 2017, Larsen repeated his national tour and gave away five million seeds to over 50,000 people. During the tour Larsen returned to Calgary to give away more seeds, even though he was still on bail from the first arrest. Police declined to interfere with the second seed giveaway.

In November 2017, Larsen's seed giveaway case went to court and the judge dismissed all charges. Prosecutors dropped initial plans for an appeal.

In 2018 and 2019 Larsen continued the seed giveaway by mail only, and claims to have given away over 10 million cannabis seeds in total. After four years Larsen ended the Overgrow Canada campaign in 2019. There were many instances of cannabis plants growing openly in public places across Canada during the campaign.

== 4/20 protest and other activism ==
Larsen acted as a spokesperson and organizer for the Vancouver 4/20 Protest Festival for several years, including transitioning the protest from the Vancouver Art Gallery to the larger venue of Sunset Beach Park in 2016. In 2019, the 4/20 festival featured a performance by Cypress Hill. Larsen is the only person to have attended every 4/20 protest from 1996 to 2019.

In July 2013, Larsen travelled to the city of Prince Rupert to mock the local police by presenting them with a "Most Wasted Time Award" trophy for their investigation and raid of a local bong shop.

== Books and writings ==
Larsen was the editor of Cannabis Culture magazine from its creation as "Cannabis Canada" in 1994 until he left the publication in 2005, after producing 54 issues with publisher Marc Emery.

Larsen is the author of The Pot Puzzle Fun Book, released in 2000, the editor of Grow Like a Pro, a marijuana growing guide released in 2004, and the creator of The Tokers Bowl Board Game.

In 2007, Larsen released Hairy Pothead and the Marijuana Stone, a cannabis-laden Harry Potter parody novel which received international media coverage.

In July 2015, Larsen released an illustrated, cannabis-themed Dr Seuss parody book called Green Buds and Hash, which produced some controversy.

In December 2015, Larsen released a book called The Illustrated History of Cannabis in Canada. To promote the book he sent a gram of marijuana and a free copy of the book to every Liberal member of Parliament, including Prime Minister Justin Trudeau. He included a letter wishing the elected officials "A Merry-Juana Christmas and a Hashy New Year."

Larsen's other books include The Pie-Eyed Piper, and most recently Sinbad the Strain Hunter: Voyage to Noweedia.

In 2021, Larsen began writing articles for Cracked.com.

== Awards and recognition ==
=== Vancouver Magazine 'Power 50' ===
In 2013 and 2017, Vancouver Magazine included Larsen on their list of the city's 50 most powerful people.

=== High Times Magazine recognition ===
In 2017, High Times Magazine recognized Larsen's Overgrow Canada cannabis seed giveaway as one of the "10 Most Memorable Marijuana Stunts" of all time.

=== Banned from entering Russia ===
In May 2022, Larsen was included on a list of 657 Canadian politicians, businessmen, journalists and activists sanctioned and banned from entering Russia.

== Electoral record ==
2011 British Columbia New Democratic Party leadership election
Candidate	First ballot		Second ballot		Third ballot	
Candidate	Votes	Percent	Votes	Percent	Votes	Percent
Adrian Dix	7,638	38.2%	7,748	39.3%	9,772	51.8%
Mike Farnworth	6,979	34.9%	6,951	35.2%	9,095	48.2%
John Horgan	4,844	24.2%	5,034	25.5%		
Dana Larsen	531	2.7%				

2001 British Columbia general election: Powell River-Sunshine Coast
Party	Candidate	Votes	%	±%	Expenditures
Liberal	Harold Long	9,904	42.36	+24.65	$63,954
New Democratic	Gordon Wilson	6,349	27.15	-0.42	$50,409
Green	Adriane Carr	6,316	27.01	+24.66	$24,821
Marijuana	Dana Albert Larsen	812	3.48	New	$4,499
Total valid votes		23,381	100	–	
Total rejected ballots		99	0.43		
Turnout		23,480	72.43		
Registered voters					

2000 Canadian federal election: West Vancouver—Sunshine Coast
Party	Candidate	Votes	%	±%	Expenditures
Alliance	John Reynolds	25,546	47.96	+7.91	$65,492
Liberal	Ian McKay	14,169	26.60	-7.92	$60,517
Progressive Conservative	Kate Manvell	4,993	9.37	+1.01	$5,777
New Democratic	Telis Savvaidis	3,351	6.29	-5.64	$9,069
Green	Jane Bishop	2,605	4.89	+0.27	$3,816
Marijuana	Dana Larsen	1,618	3.03	–	
Canadian Action	Marc Bombois	976	1.83	–	$3,227
Total valid votes		53,258	100.0		
Total rejected ballots		155	0.29	-0.11	
Turnout		53,413	63.81	-2.99	
Alliance hold		Swing		+7.92	
Canadian Alliance change is based on the Reform Party vote.
