= 2011 British Columbia New Democratic Party leadership election =

Political party leadership election in British Columbia, Canada

- April 17, 2011
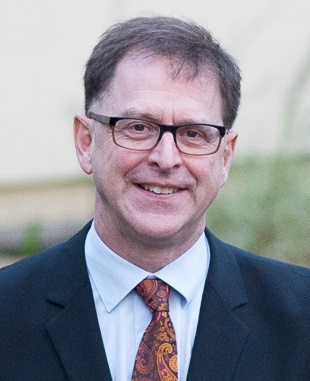

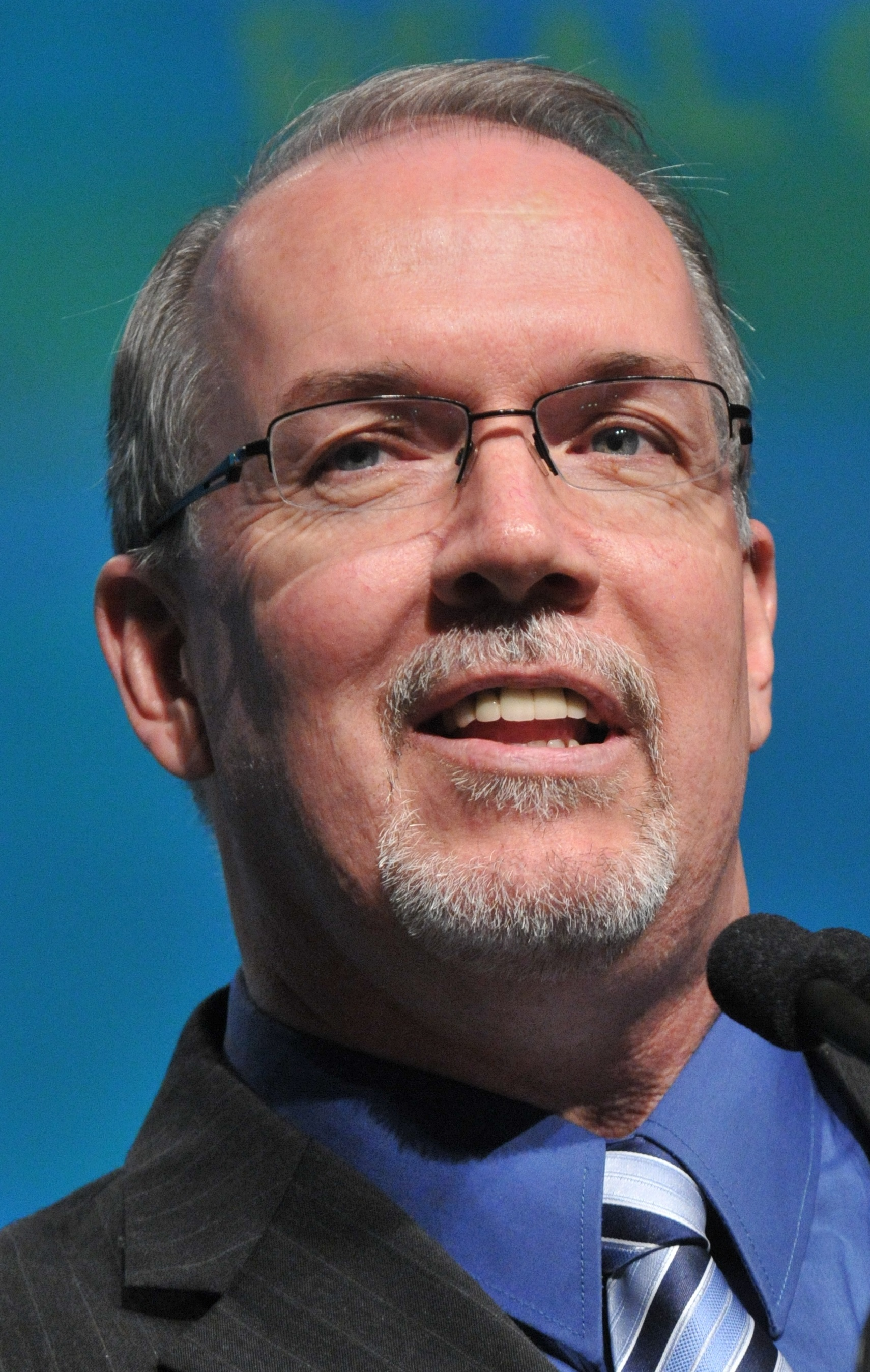
Candidate	Adrian Dix	Mike Farnworth	John Horgan
Third ballot	9,772 (51.8%)	9,095 (48.2%)	Eliminated
Second ballot	7,748 (39.3%)	6,951 (35.2%)	5,034 (25.5%)
First ballot	7,638 (38.2%)	6,979 (34.9%)	4,844 (24.2%)
Leader before election
Dawn Black (interim)
Elected Leader
Adrian Dix

2011 British Columbia New Democratic Party leadership election
- Date: April 17, 2011
- Convention: Vancouver Convention Centre
- Resigning leader: Carole James
- Won by: Adrian Dix
- Ballots: 3
- Candidates: 4
- Entrance fee: $15,000
- Spending limit: $175,000

The British Columbia New Democratic Party held a leadership election in 2011 to replace departing leader Carole James. The election was prompted by James' announcement on December 6, 2010 that she would be resigning as leader of the party. The convention was held on April 17, 2011 at the Vancouver Convention Centre with voting occurring by telephone and via internet on that date and through advance voting.

Adrian Dix was elected leader, narrowly defeating rival Mike Farnworth on the third ballot.

== Background ==
On May 12, 2009, the 2009 British Columbia general election was held. The NDP remained in opposition to the governing Liberal Party, and the results were largely unchanged from the 2005 election: only three seats changed hands, and the popular vote changed by less than a percentage point. It also marked the party's second loss with Carole James as leader. Despite the loss, James announced she would continue as party leader.

In July 2010, Vaughn Palmer of the Vancouver Sun reported that some party members were quietly dissatisfied with James's leadership and that she could face a challenge at the next party convention, then planned for fall 2011. That October, MLA Bob Simpson criticized a speech that James gave to the Union of BC Municipalities as having little to offer and lacking in specifics. In response, James expelled him from caucus, saying his comments were out of line. Though Simpson had expected a reprimand, he expected "a slap on the wrist" and was surprised to be kicked out of caucus. In media appearances shortly afterwards, Simpson expressed concern that "the NDP is not moving in the polls despite a government being on its knees"; fellow MLA Michael Sather admitted that he "frequently" dealt with complaints from constituents about the leadership. One week later, on October 15, Norm Macdonald resigned as caucus chair in protest of the expulsion, criticizing James for doing so without consulting caucus beforehand.

On November 19, caucus whip Katrine Conroy stepped down after five years in the post, saying she felt she no longer had the "trust, confidence and support of the leader and caucus". Conroy's press conference was attended by three other MLAs: Jenny Kwan, Lana Popham and Claire Trevena. James was defiant, charging that her critics were putting their concerns ahead of the party and province, and said the party must "grow up" and stop in-fighting. The following day, on November 20, the NDP's governing council met, and rejected a resolution to hold a leadership convention in December 2011 by a vote of 97 to 18. James characterized the vote as "a message sent to everyone - including every member of caucus - 'Get on with the work we have to do.'" However, the meeting also exposed the rift in caucus: supporters of James had passed out yellow scarves to wear, to serve as a powerful visual endorsement of James' leadership, and thirteen MLAs refused to don the scarves. Doug Routley, one of the dissidents, later said that he and most others had kept their concerns private until then, and were upset by the demand for public obeisance. The thirteen dissidents — dubbed the "baker's dozen" in the media — were Conroy, Kwan, Macdonald, Popham, Routley, Sather, Trevena, Robin Austin, Gary Coons, Guy Gentner, Leonard Krog, Harry Lali and Nicholas Simons.

On December 1, Kwan released a statement calling for a leadership race, saying that "Carole James is dividing the party by staying on as leader ... the B.C. NDP needs to have a leadership race in order to revitalize itself and to unify the party." The NDP quickly scheduled an emergency caucus meeting, with James saying "Every MLA will be held accountable for their behaviour." In response, the baker's dozen delivered an ultimatum that they were a united front: if any one of them were ejected from caucus, the rest would leave. On December 5, the planned caucus meeting was postponed.

On December 6, James announced her resignation as leader, pending the selection of an interim leader. Dawn Black was unanimously nominated by the provincial caucus to be the interim leader on January 19, 2011.

== Timeline ==
=== 2010 ===
- December 6 – Carole James announced she will step down as leader of the New Democratic Party as soon as an interim leader can be selected.
- December 29 – Marijuana Activist Dana Larsen announced his candidacy.

=== 2011 ===
- January 5 – Powell River-Sunshine Coast MLA Nicholas Simons announced his candidacy.
- January 6 – Fraser-Nicola MLA Harry Lali announced his candidacy.
- January 13 – Port Coquitlam MLA Mike Farnworth announced his candidacy.
- January 17 – Vancouver-Kingsway MLA Adrian Dix announced his candidacy.
- February 17 – Harry Lali withdraws his candidacy.
- April 7 – Nicholas Simons withdraws and endorses John Horgan.
- April 17 – Leadership convention held at the Vancouver Convention Centre with voting occurring by telephone and via internet on that date and through advance voting. Adrian Dix is elected leader on the third ballot.

== Candidates ==
=== Confirmed ===
==== Adrian Dix ====
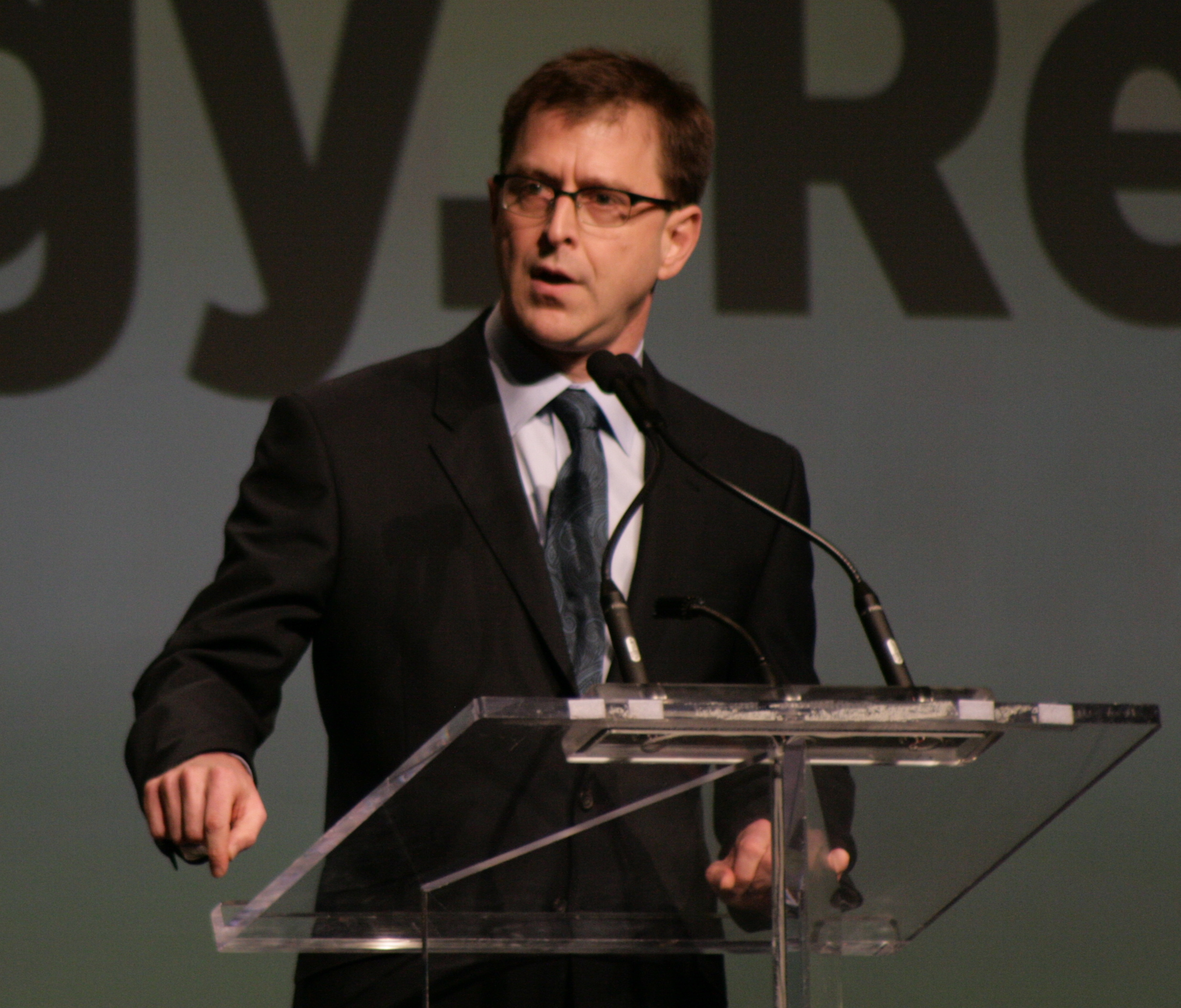
Dix speaking at the convention

Adrian Dix is the MLA for Vancouver-Kingsway (2005–present) and former Chief of Staff to Premier Glen Clark.

Support from caucus members: Harry Bains (Surrey-Newton), Mable Elmore (Vancouver-Kensington), Sue Hammell (Surrey-Green Timbers), Michelle Mungall (Nelson-Creston), Bruce Ralston (Surrey-Whalley)
Support from federal caucus members: Don Davies (Vancouver-Kingsway), Libby Davies (Vancouver East)
Support from former caucus members: Lois Boone (Prince George North), Pietro Calendino (Burnaby North), Evelyn Gillespie (Comox Valley), Anita Hagen (New Westminster), Joy MacPhail (Vancouver-Hastings, former leader), Jenn McGinn (Vancouver-Fairview), Chuck Puchmayr (New Westminster), Svend Robinson (MP for Burnaby-Douglas)
Date campaign launched: January 16, 2011
Policies: Commit to eliminating the HST, seek to roll back reductions in the corporate tax rate, support the redirection of carbon tax revenue to pay for public transit and infrastructure that reduces greenhouse gas emissions, support an increase in the minimum wage rate to $10 per hour, create a provincial child care system, restore grants to the post-secondary students, reduce interest on student loans, and restore the corporation capital tax on financial institutions.

==== Mike Farnworth ====
Mike Farnworth is the MLA for Port Coquitlam (1991–2001, 2005–present), former Minister of Municipal Affairs and Housing (1997–98), Minister of Employment and Investment and Minister Responsible for Housing (1998–2000), Minister of Health and Minister Responsible for Seniors (2000), and Minister Social Development and Economic Security (2000–01).

Support from caucus members: Jagrup Brar (Surrey-Fleetwood), Katrine Conroy (Kootenay West), Doug Donaldson (Stikine), Rob Fleming (Victoria-Swan Lake), Guy Gentner (Delta North), Norm Macdonald (Columbia River-Revelstoke), Lana Popham (Saanich South), Doug Routley (Nanaimo-North Cowichan), Leonard Krog (Nanaimo), Jenny Kwan (Vancouver-Mount Pleasant)
Support from federal caucus members: Alex Atamanenko (Southern Interior)
Support from former caucus members: Mike Harcourt (Vancouver-Mount Pleasant, former Premier), Gretchen Brewin (Victoria-Beacon Hill), John Cashore (Coquitlam-Maillardville), Barbara Copping (Port Moody-Burnaby Mountain), Corky Evans (Nelson-Creston), Harold Steves (Richmond), Bernie Simpson (Vancouver-Fraserview), Ed Conroy (Rossland-Trail), Joan Sawicki (Burnaby-Willingdon), Dale Lovick (Nanaimo), David Cubberley (Saanich South),
Date campaign launched: January 13, 2011
Policies: Support BC agricultural sector through a BC Food-First policy, a regional 'no net-loss policy' for the Agricultural Land Reserve, remove regulatory disincentives to farm-gate sales, return the investment in agricultural sector to national average (14% of agricultural GDP); revenue sharing with local government from resource extraction, create a Jobs Protection Commissioner, repeal the Significant Projects Streamlining Act

==== John Horgan ====
John Horgan is the MLA for Malahat-Juan de Fuca (2005–present)

Support from caucus members: Kathy Corrigan (Burnaby-Deer Lake), Scott Fraser (Alberni-Pacific Rim), Maurine Karagianis (Esquimalt-Royal Roads), Harry Lali (Fraser-Nicola), Bill Routley (Cowichan Valley), Nicholas Simons (Powell River-Sunshine Coast), Shane Simpson (Vancouver-Hastings), Claire Trevena (North Island)
Support from former caucus members: Lynn Hunter (former MP for Saanich-Gulf Islands), Bob Skelly (Alberni, MP for Comox-Alberni, former leader), Ray Skelly (MP for North Island--Powell River), Jim Manly (MP for Cowichan—Malahat—The Islands)
Date campaign launched: January 10, 2011
Policies: propose a 'Fair Tax Commission' to examine levels taxation and government revenue, support the inclusion of large industrial emitters into the carbon tax, support for the Evergreen Line and light rail to the Western Communities, introduce an Endangered Species Act, support the ban on offshore oil exploration and the ban on North Coast tanker traffic, work to implement the recommendations of the Select Standing Committee on Aquaculture.

==== Dana Larsen ====
Dana Larsen was leader of the BC Marijuana Party from 2001 to 2003 when he resigned to join the NDP. In 2008 he was a federal NDP candidate for West Vancouver-Sunshine Coast-Sea to Sky Country but resigned after a video surfaced of him driving after using marijuana and hallucinogenic drugs.

Larsen's eligibility to run for the party leadership is at issue with party president Moe Sihota stating that Larsen's party membership has lapsed. Larsen responded by saying there was a "clerical error" as his donation to the party was processed but his membership was not. Sihota also says that even if Larsen renews his membership he may be ineligible due to the controversy surrounding his federal candidacy in 2008. The party's rules committee will set eligibility requirements in January; Sihota says that as a result Larsen "may be ultimately ineligible" regardless of his party membership status.

Date campaign launched: December 29, 2010
Policies: Legally tax and regulate marijuana, increase minimum wage to $10/hour indexed to inflation, ban corporate and union donations to political parties, promote the party's 'Sustainable BC' platform in the next election, work towards decriminalizing the sex trade

=== Withdrawn ===
==== Harry Lali ====
Harry Lali is the MLA for Fraser-Nicola (1991–2001, 2005–present), former Minister of Transportation (1998 to 2001)

Date campaign launched: January 6, 2011
Date campaign ended: February 17, 2011, endorsed Horgan on March 17, 2011
Proposed policies: Remove quotas for female and minority candidates within BC NDP

==== Nicholas Simons ====
Nicholas Simons is the MLA for Powell River-Sunshine Coast (2005–present)

Date campaign launched: January 5, 2011
Date campaign ended: April 7, 2011, endorsed Horgan on April 7, 2011
Policies: $12 minimum wage by 2012; increase arts and cultural funding to national average, restoring gaming grants to non-profit organizations, and make province at arm's length from B.C. Arts Council;

=== Declined ===
- Dawn Black, MLA for New Westminster (2009–2013).
- Spencer Chandra Herbert, MLA for Vancouver-West End (2008–present).
- Derek Corrigan, mayor of Burnaby (2002–2018). Endorsed Horgan.
- Nathan Cullen, MP for Skeena-Bulkley Valley.
- Corky Evans, former MLA for Nelson-Creston and Cabinet Minister
- Rob Fleming, MLA for Victoria-Swan Lake. Endorsed Farnworth.
- George Heyman, executive director of the Sierra Club of BC, former president of the B.C. Government and Service Employees' Union.
- Peter Julian, MP for Burnaby—New Westminster
- Leonard Krog, MLA for Nanaimo. Endorsed Farnworth.
- Jenny Kwan, MLA for Vancouver-Mount Pleasant. Endorsed Farnworth.
- Bruce Ralston, MLA for Surrey-Whalley. Endorsed Dix.
- Gregor Robertson, mayor of Vancouver, former MLA for Vancouver-Fairview

== Results ==
Candidate	First ballot		Second ballot		Third ballot	
Candidate	Votes	Percent	Votes	Percent	Votes	Percent
Adrian Dix	7,638	38.2%	7,748	39.3%	9,772	51.8%
Mike Farnworth	6,979	34.9%	6,951	35.2%	9,095	48.2%
John Horgan	4,844	24.2%	5,034	25.5%		
Dana Larsen	531	2.7%				
