= Community Legal Assistance Society =

Community Legal Assistance Society, previously the Vancouver Community Legal Assistance Society, is a non-governmental organization in British Columbia, Canada which provides legal services to low- and moderate-income persons in the areas of mental health law, human rights law, and poverty law. Founded in 1971, CLAS is often referred to as Canada's first community law office. CLAS operates a BC Human Rights Clinic, a Mental Health Law Program, and a poverty law-focused Community Law Program.

== History ==
CLAS was founded by future British Columbia premier Mike Harcourt. In the summer of 1971, it opened its first office at 527 East Broadway in Vancouver.

== See also ==
- Legal Services Society
- Law Society of British Columbia
- British Columbia Civil Liberties Association
