= Howard White (writer) =

Canadian writer

Franklin Howard White, CM OBC (born 1945 in Abbotsford, British Columbia) is a Canadian writer, editor, publisher and politician.

In the early 1970s, he founded the Raincoast Chronicles and Harbour Publishing. In 2013, he and his wife Mary purchased the assets of the leading British Columbia book publisher Douglas & McIntyre and restructured it as Douglas & McIntyre (2013) Ltd. with White as publisher. He has been president of the Association of Book Publishers of British Columbia, a member of the Board of Governors of Emily Carr University of Art and Design, the Advisory Board of the Canadian Centre for Studies in Publishing at Simon Fraser University and the Advisory Board of the Institute for Coastal Research at Vancouver Island University.

== Published works ==
- Raincoast Chronicles (1972, editor)
- A Hard Man to Beat (1983, with Bill White)
- The Men There Were Then (1983, poems)
- Spilsbury's Coast (1987, with Jim Spilsbury)
- The Accidental Airline (1988, with Jim Spilsbury)
- Patrick and the Backhoe (children's), with Bus Griffiths
- Writing in the Rain (1990, collection)
- Ghost in the Gears (1993, poems)
- The Sunshine Coast (1996, travel)
- The Encyclopedia of British Columbia (2000, publisher, contributor), a 10-year project.
- The Airplane Ride (2006, children's)
- A Mysterious Humming Noise (2019, poems)
- Here on the Coast (2021, stories)

== Awards ==
- Canadian Historical Association's Career Award for Regional History in 1989.
- Order of BC
- Stephen Leacock Medal for Humour
- James Douglas BC Publisher of the Year Award
- Queen Elizabeth II Golden Jubilee Medal
- Queen Elizabeth II Diamond Jubilee Medal
- Honorary Doctor of Laws Degree from the University of Victoria.
- Two-time runner-up in the Whiskey Slough Putty Man Triathlon
- S.S. Beaver Award for Maritime Excellence
- Member of the Order of Canada

== Electoral record ==
1991 British Columbia general election: Powell River-Sunshine Coast
Party	Candidate	Votes	%	Expenditures
Liberal	Gordon Wilson	11,486	54.69	$42,914
New Democratic	Howard White	7,117	33.88	$56,523
Social Credit	Harold Long	2,174	10.35	$26,527
Green	Janet E. Calder	161	0.77	$439
Common Sense	Roslyn Griston	66	0.31	$200
Total valid votes		21,004	100	
Total rejected ballots		300	1.41	
Turnout		21,304	82.61	
Registered voters				
