= Harold Long (politician) =

Canadian politician

Member of the British Columbia Legislative Assembly for Powell River-Sunshine Coast
- In office May 16, 2001 – May 17, 2005
- Preceded by: Gordon Wilson
- Succeeded by: Nicholas Simons

Member of the British Columbia Legislative Assembly for Mackenzie
- In office October 22, 1986 – October 17, 1991
- Preceded by: Donald Lockstead
- Succeeded by: Gordon Wilson

Personal details
- Born: April 10, 1941 Powell River, British Columbia
- Died: May 21, 2013 (aged 72) Stuart Island, British Columbia
- Party: Social Credit → BC Liberal

Harold Long (April 10, 1941 – May 21, 2013) was a politician in British Columbia (BC), Canada.

Long was born in Powell River, the son of George Hibbert Long and Augusta Denise Simard, and from 1958 he worked in the family transportation business (City Transfer) and in 1979 purchased and expanded it. In 1961, he married Beverley Ann Doxsee.

He served as Member of the Legislative Assembly (MLA) for Mackenzie from 1986 to 1991 as a Social Credit MLA. He served as Deputy Whip for the Government Caucus and worked as a BC Ferries director until 1991. He was defeated in the 1991 election in the renamed riding of Powell River-Sunshine Coast by Gordon Wilson, then leader of the BC Liberals. Following his defeat, he returned to his family business and was elected in 1992 in a by-election to the Powell River municipal council. He was elected for Powell River-Sunshine Coast in the provincial 2001 election as a BC Liberal candidate. Long did not run for reelection in 2005.

He held positions as Deputy Chair of the Committee of the Whole and was member of the Government Caucus Committee on Natural Resources.

He was awarded the Golden Jubilee Medal in 2002.

== Death ==
Long, aged 72, was the pilot and sole occupant of a DHC-2 Beaver float plane that was seen overturned in Bute Inlet, near Stuart Island, north of the city of Campbell River, on May 21, 2013. The Canadian Coast Guard and Royal Canadian Mounted Police recovered his body from the scene.

== Electoral record ==
2001 British Columbia general election: Powell River-Sunshine Coast
| Party | Candidate | Votes | % | ±% | Expenditures |
|---|---|---|---|---|---|
| Liberal | Harold Long | 9,904 | 42.36 | +24.65 | $63,954 |
| New Democratic | Gordon Wilson | 6,349 | 27.15 | -0.42 | $50,409 |
| Green | Adriane Carr | 6,316 | 27.01 | +24.66 | $24,821 |
| Marijuana | Dana Albert Larsen | 812 | 3.48 | New | $4,499 |
| Total valid votes | | 23,381 | 100 | – | |
| Total rejected ballots | | 99 | 0.43 | | |
| Turnout | | 23,480 | 72.43 | | |
| Registered voters | | | | | |

1991 British Columbia general election: Powell River-Sunshine Coast
| Party | Candidate | Votes | % | Expenditures |
|---|---|---|---|---|
| Liberal | Gordon Wilson | 11,486 | 54.69 | $42,914 |
| New Democratic | Howard White | 7,117 | 33.88 | $56,523 |
| Social Credit | Harold Long | 2,174 | 10.35 | $26,527 |
| Green | Janet E. Calder | 161 | 0.77 | $439 |
| Common Sense | Roslyn Griston | 66 | 0.31 | $200 |
| Total valid votes | | 21,004 | 100 | |
| Total rejected ballots | | 300 | 1.41 | |
| Turnout | | 21,304 | 82.61 | |
| Registered voters | | | | |

1986 British Columbia general election: Mackenzie
| Party | Candidate | Votes | % | Expenditures |
|---|---|---|---|---|
| Social Credit | Harold Long | 8,530 | 43.68 | |
| New Democratic | Don Lockstead | 8,261 | 42.30 | |
| Liberal | Gordon Wilson | 2,739 | 14.02 | |
| Total valid votes | | 19,530 | 100 | |
| Total rejected ballots | | 350 | | |
| Turnout | | | | |
| Registered voters | | | | |
