= Randene Neill =

Canadian politician

Randene Neill MLA
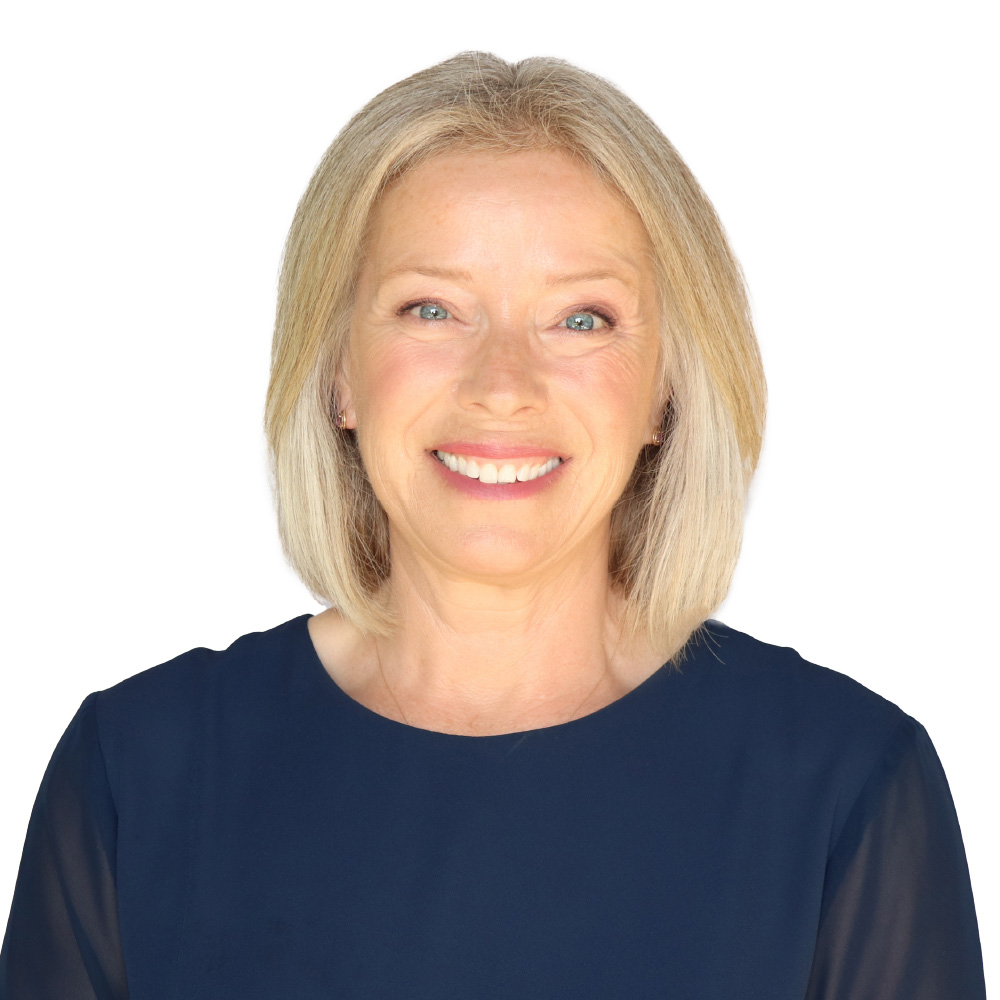
- Campaign portrait, 2024

Minister of Water, Land and Resource Stewardship of British Columbia
- In office November 18, 2024 – November 20, 2026
- Premier: David Eby
- Preceded by: Nathan Cullen
- Succeeded by: Donegal Wilson

Member of the British Columbia Legislative Assembly for Powell River-Sunshine Coast
- Incumbent
- Assumed office October 19, 2024
- Preceded by: Nicholas Simons

Personal details
- Born: 1968 or 1969 (age 57–58) Vernon, British Columbia
- Party: BC NDP
- Education: University of British Columbia; British Columbia Institute of Technology
- Occupation: Journalist

Randene Neill MLA is a Canadian politician and former journalist. She was elected to the Legislative Assembly of British Columbia in the 2024 general election, representing the electoral district of Powell River-Sunshine Coast as a member of the British Columbia New Democratic Party. Neill served as Minister of Water, Land and Resource Stewardship under Premier David Eby.

== Early life and career ==
Born in Vernon, British Columbia, Neill studied at the University of British Columbia, graduating in 1991 with a Bachelor of Arts, and at the British Columbia Institute of Technology, graduating in 1996. She joined BCTV in 1998 as a news writer and reporter, and was appointed noon news anchor when the station rebranded as Global BC in 2001. In 2011, she became the station's late-night news anchor, later moving to the morning news. Neill left Global in 2016 to work as a communications director with Anthem Properties. In 2021, she returned to broadcasting as the morning co-anchor for all-news radio station CKWX, leaving in 2022 after a ten-month stint.

A video of Neill during an animal adoption segment at Global BC went viral when a shelter dog jumped on her and licked her face, while another dog ran around.

Neill currently resides in Pender Harbour, having moved there in 2020.

== Political career ==
After incumbent MLA Nicholas Simons announced he would not seek re-election, Neill successfully ran for the British Columbia New Democratic Party nomination for the riding of Powell River-Sunshine Coast. She ran against 5 other candidates, and after 4 rounds of counting she secured the nomination on June 8, 2024. She was elected as MLA in the 2024 British Columbia general election, and was appointed Minister of Water, Land and Resource Stewardship by Premier David Eby on November 18, 2024.

Neill has expressed support for a proposed name change of the City of Powell River, which was requested by the Tla’amin Nation due to the assimilationist policies of Israel Powell, B.C.'s superintendent of Indian affairs from 1872 to 1889.

== Electoral record ==
2026 British Columbia general election: Powell River-Sunshine Coast
Party	Candidate	Votes	%	±%	Expenditures
New Democratic	Randene Neill	13,314	48.81		
Conservative	John Henderson	10,672	39.12		
Green	Griffin Leonard Lea	3,251	11.92		
Total valid votes		27,237	99.85		
Total rejected ballots		40	0.15		
Turnout		27,277			
Registered voters					
New Democratic hold		Swing		−1.94	
Source: Elections BC

2024 British Columbia general election: Powell River-Sunshine Coast
Party	Candidate	Votes	%	±%	Expenditures
New Democratic	Randene Neill	14,474	49.62	-1.27	$45,816.99
Conservative	Chris Moore	10,409	35.68	–	$42,419.32
Green	Chris Hergesheimer	3,932	13.48	-18.99	$34,685.32
Independent	Greg Reid	356	1.22	–	$1,043.32
Total valid votes/expense limit		29,171	99.91	–	$71,700.08
Total rejected ballots		27	0.09	–	
Turnout		29,198	66.35	+6.36	
Registered voters		44,009			
New Democratic hold		Swing		-18.47	
Source: Elections BC
