= Powell River-Sunshine Coast =

Provincial electoral district in British Columbia, Canada

British Columbia electoral district
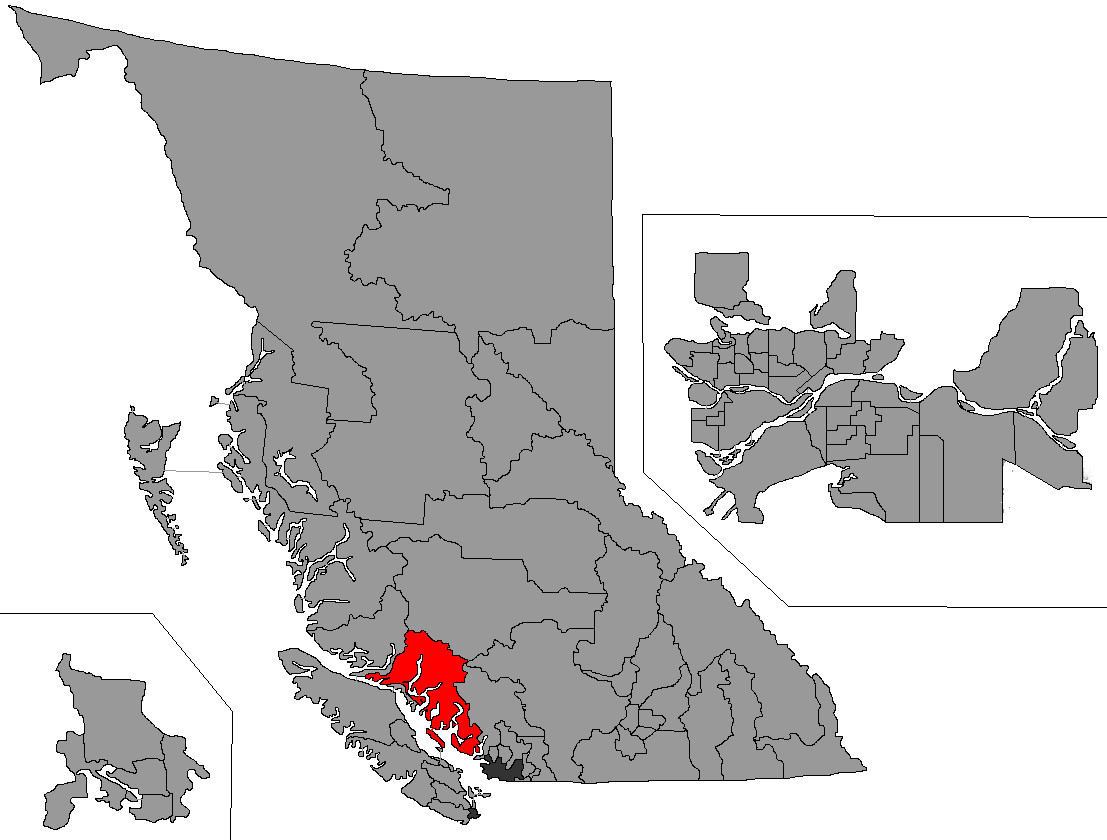

Provincial electoral district
- Legislature: Legislative Assembly of British Columbia
MLA
Randene Neill
New Democratic
- District created: 1991
- First contested: 1991
- Last contested: 2026

Demographics
- Population (2001): 45,406
- Area (km²): 39,009
- Pop. density (per km²): 1.2
- Census division(s): qathet, Sunshine Coast
- Census subdivision(s): Gibsons, Powell River, Sechelt

Powell River-Sunshine Coast is a provincial electoral district for the Legislative Assembly of British Columbia, Canada.

== Demographics ==
Population, 2001	45,406
Population change, 1996–2001	1.1%
Area (km^{2})	39,009
Population density (people per km^{2})	1.16

== Members of the Legislative Assembly ==
Powell River-Sunshine Coast
Assembly	Years	Member	Party
Riding created from Mackenzie
35th	1991–1993	Gordon Wilson	Liberal
35th	1993–1996	Gordon Wilson	Progressive Democrat
36th	1996–1999	Gordon Wilson	Progressive Democrat
36th	1999–2001	Gordon Wilson	New Democratic
37th	2001–2005	Harold Long	Liberal
38th	2005–2009	Nicholas Simons	New Democratic
39th	2009–2013	Nicholas Simons	New Democratic
40th	2013–2017	Nicholas Simons	New Democratic
41st	2017–2020	Nicholas Simons	New Democratic
42nd	2020–2024	Nicholas Simons	New Democratic
43rd	2024–2026	Randene Neill	New Democratic
44th	2026–present	Randene Neill	New Democratic

=== Current MLA ===
Randene Neill (BC NDP) was elected to represent the riding during the 2024 BC election. Prior to entering politics she was a television news journalist for Global BC for over 20 years, until her departure in 2017. She was appointed Minister of Water, Land, and Resource Stewardship on November 18, 2024.

=== Former MLAs ===
The first MLA to represent the riding was Gordon Wilson. Wilson was the leader of the BC Liberal party from 1987 to 1993. During a 1991 leaders debate he had a great performance, catapulting his party in the polls. The BC Liberals went from 0 seats in the 1986 BC election, to 17, becoming the Official Opposition. In 1993 he was caught having an affair with a fellow MLA, Judi Tyabji, and lost the Liberal leadership. He and Tyabji left the Liberal party and went on to form the Progressive Democratic Alliance, with Wilson as leader. Wilson won re-election under the party banner, but Tybaji did not. He dissolved the party in 1999 and joined the BC NDP. As a member of the BC NDP he served in several cabinet positions and ran for its leadership in 2000, but dropped out before the vote. He lost re-election in 2001 to Harold Long.

Harold Long was the former Social Credit MLA for Mackenzie, from 1986 to 1991, until he lost re-election to Wilson. He returned to office as a BC Liberal in 2001. He announced he would not run for re-election in 2005. He died in a plane crash in 2013.

Nicholas Simons, a member of the BC NDP, won the seat in 2005. He worked as a social worker before entering politics. Simons was also one of the first openly gay men to serve in the legislature. He served for over 19 years before announcing his retirement prior to the 2024 BC election. He endorsed Randene Neill to succeed him, and she went on to win the seat. During his time in office he also served as Minister of Social Development and Poverty Reduction from 2020 to 2022 and ran for the BC NDP leadership in 2011, but dropped out before voting took place.

== Election results ==
2026 British Columbia general election
Party	Candidate	Votes	%	±%	Expenditures
New Democratic	Randene Neill	12,783	49.01	-0.61	
Conservative	John Henderson	10,156	38.94	+3.26	
Green	Griffin Leonard Lea	3,103	11.90	-1.58	
Total valid votes		26,042	99.85		
Total rejected ballots		40	0.15		
Turnout					
Registered voters					
New Democratic hold		Swing		-1.94	
Source: Elections BC

2024 British Columbia general election
Party	Candidate	Votes	%	±%	Expenditures
New Democratic	Randene Neill	14,474	49.62	-1.27	$45,816.99
Conservative	Chris Moore	10,409	35.68	–	$42,419.32
Green	Chris Hergesheimer	3,932	13.48	-18.99	$34,685.32
Independent	Greg Reid	356	1.22	–	$1,043.32
Total valid votes/expense limit		29,171	99.91	–	$71,700.08
Total rejected ballots		27	0.09	–	
Turnout		29,198	66.35	+6.36	
Registered voters		44,009			
New Democratic hold		Swing		-18.47	
Source: Elections BC

2020 British Columbia general election
Party	Candidate	Votes	%	±%	Expenditures
New Democratic	Nicholas Simons	12,701	50.88	+0.18	$36,504.80
Green	Kim Darwin	8,104	32.47	+8.30	$18,011.22
Liberal	Sandra Stoddart-Hansen	4,156	16.65	−7.88	$15,266.38
Total valid votes		24,961	99.28	–	
Total rejected ballots		182	0.72	+0.43	
Turnout		25,143	59.98	–9.63	
Registered voters		41,921			
New Democratic hold		Swing		–4.06	
Source: Elections BC

2017 British Columbia general election
Party	Candidate	Votes	%	±%	Expenditures
New Democratic	Nicholas Simons	13,646	50.70	−4.50	$42,438
Liberal	Mathew Wilson	6,602	24.53	−8.25	$65,433
Green	Kim Darwin	6,505	24.17	+12.15	$20,298
Cascadia	Reuben Richards	160	0.60	–	$125
Total valid votes		26,913	100.00	–	
Total rejected ballots		78	0.29	−0.10	
Turnout		26,991	69.60	+6.36	
Registered voters		38,778			
Source: Elections BC

2013 British Columbia general election
Party	Candidate	Votes	%	±%	Expenditures
New Democratic	Nicholas Simons	13,120	55.20	-3.08	$66,335
Liberal	Patrick Muncaster	7,792	32.78	-1.54	$41,207
Green	Richard Carl Till	2,856	12.02	+5.72	$4,537
Total valid votes		23,768	100.00		
Total rejected ballots		92	0.39		
Turnout		23,860	63.24		
Source: Elections BC

2009 British Columbia general election
Party	Candidate	Votes	%	±%	Expenditures
New Democratic	Nicholas Simons	13,276	58.28	+14.83	$66,566
Liberal	Dawn Miller	7,818	34.32	+4.17	$102,008
Green	Jeff Chilton	1,436	6.30	-19.48	$350
Refederation	Allen McIntyre	249	1.10	+0.48	$1,110
Total valid votes		22,779	100	–	
Total rejected ballots		102	0.45		
Turnout		22,881	63.02		
Registered voters					

2005 British Columbia general election
Party	Candidate	Votes	%	±%	Expenditures
New Democratic	Nicholas Simons	11,099	43.45	+26.30	$108,403
Liberal	Maureen Clayton	7,702	30.15	-12.21	$102,008
Green	Adriane Carr	6,585	25.78	-1.23	$350
Refederation	Allen McIntyre	249	0.62	New	$1,110
Total valid votes		25,542	100	–	
Total rejected ballots		109	0.43		
Turnout		25,651	72.43		
Registered voters					

2001 British Columbia general election
Party	Candidate	Votes	%	±%	Expenditures
Liberal	Harold Long	9,904	42.36	+24.65	$63,954
New Democratic	Gordon Wilson	6,349	27.15	-0.42	$50,409
Green	Adriane Carr	6,316	27.01	+24.66	$24,821
Marijuana	Dana Albert Larsen	812	3.48	New	$4,499
Total valid votes		23,381	100	–	
Total rejected ballots		99	0.43		
Turnout		23,480	72.43		
Registered voters					

1996 British Columbia general election
Party	Candidate	Votes	%	±%	Expenditures
Progressive Democrat	Gordon Wilson	10,833	49.05	New	$18,579
New Democratic	Bill Forst	6,088	27.57	-6.31	$30,942
Liberal	Cameron Reid	3,911	17.71	-36.98	$31,957
Reform	Don Atkinson	677	3.07	New	$10,560
Green	D. Wendy Young	518	2.35	+1.58	$834
Common Sense	Roslyn Griston	57	0.26	New	$272
Total valid votes		22,084	100	–	
Total rejected ballots		66	0.30		
Turnout		22,150	75.37		
Registered voters					

1991 British Columbia general election
Party	Candidate	Votes	%	Expenditures
Liberal	Gordon Wilson	11,486	54.69	$42,914
New Democratic	Howard White	7,117	33.88	$56,523
Social Credit	Harold Long	2,174	10.35	$26,527
Green	Janet E. Calder	161	0.77	$439
Common Sense	Roslyn Griston	66	0.31	$200
Total valid votes		21,004	100	
Total rejected ballots		300	1.41	
Turnout		21,304	82.61	
Registered voters				

== See also ==
- List of British Columbia provincial electoral districts
- Canadian provincial electoral districts
