= Harbour Publishing =

Canadian book publisher

- Founded: 1974
- Founder: Howard and Mary White
- Country of origin: Canada
- Headquarters location: Pender Harbour, British Columbia
- Distribution: self-distributed (Canada); Midpoint Trade Books (US); Gazelle Book Services (UK)
- Publication types: Books
- Imprints: Lost Moose Books
- Official website: www.harbourpublishing.com

Harbour Publishing is a Canadian independent book publisher.

The company was founded in 1974 by Howard and Mary White, and is based in Pender Harbour, a small town on British Columbia's Sunshine Coast. Harbour mainly publishes books on British Columbian history, culture, wildlife and environment. As of 2024, Harbour has published over 1000 titles. Harbour Publishing is the exclusive distributor for Nightwood Editions, Bluefield Books and Lost Moose Books. In 2013, the owners of Harbour acquired Douglas & McIntyre.

== Notable publications ==
- Raincoast Chronicles series edited by Howard White (1977–present)
- Now You're Logging by Bus Griffiths (1978)
- Writing in the Rain by Howard White (1990)
- The Golden Pine Cone (1994)
- The Encyclopedia of British Columbia edited by Daniel Francis (2000)
- Beyond Remembering: The Collected Poems of Al Purdy edited by Sam Solecki (2000)
- Marine Life of the Pacific Northwest: A Photographic Encyclopedia by Andy Lamb and Bernie Hanby (2005)
- The Encyclopedia of Raincoast Place Names by Andrew Scott (2009)
- The Fly in Autumn by David Zieroth (2009 Governor General’s Award for Poetry)
- History Hunting in the Yukon by Michael Gates (2010)
- Adventures in Solitude by Grant Lawrence (2010)
- Coastal Fishes of the Pacific Northwest: Revised and Expanded by Andy Lamb and Phil Edgell (2010)
- The Chuck Davis History of Metropolitan Vancouver by Chuck Davis (2011)
- The Book of Kale by Sharon Hanna (2012)
- Raven Brings the Light by Roy Henry Vickers and Robert Budd (2013)
