= Gordon Wilson (British Columbia politician) =

Canadian politician

Leader of the Opposition in British Columbia
- In office 5 November 1991 – 11 September 1993
- Preceded by: Mike Harcourt
- Succeeded by: Fred Gingell

Leader of the British Columbia Liberal Party
- In office 30 October 1987 – 11 September 1993
- Preceded by: Art Lee
- Succeeded by: Gordon Campbell

Member of the Legislative Assembly for Powell River-Sunshine Coast
- In office 17 October 1991 – 16 May 2001
- Preceded by: Riding established
- Succeeded by: Harold Long

Personal details
- Born: 2 January 1949 (age 77) Vancouver, British Columbia
- Party: BC Liberal (1987–1993, 2013–present); Progressive Democratic Alliance (1993–1999); New Democratic (1999–2013)
- Spouse(s): Judi Tyabji (m. 1994, div. 2022); Elizabeth Wilson (div. 1994)

Gordon Wilson (born 2 January 1949) is a former provincial politician in British Columbia, Canada. He served as leader of the Liberal Party of BC from 1987–1993, leader and founder of the Progressive Democratic Alliance from 1993–1999, before joining the NDP where he served in the provincial cabinet. He also ran as a candidate in the 2000 BC New Democratic Party leadership race. During the 2013 British Columbia provincial election, Wilson endorsed Liberal Premier Christy Clark for re-election over the NDP's Adrian Dix.

== Background ==
Wilson was born in Vancouver, spent his early years in Kenya and returned to British Columbia in the 1970s. He has a BSc from the State University of New York at New Paltz, and a master's degree from the University of British Columbia in resource economics.

He raised two children with his wife Elizabeth in the Middlepoint area of BC's Sunshine Coast, dabbling in pig farming before teaching resource economics and economic geography at Capilano College (North Vancouver), where he also served as president of the faculty association.

== Political career ==
After an unsuccessful campaign to be elected to the BC Legislature in the 1986 provincial election, in 1987, Wilson took over as leader of the BC Liberal Party, which had not elected a member in over a decade. He was defeated in a 1989 provincial byelection. In the 1991 general election, Wilson's profile skyrocketed after his highly successful performance in the campaign's televised leaders debate. During a nasty squabble between BC Socred leader and Premier Rita Johnston and BC NDP leader Mike Harcourt, Wilson famously said, "Here's a classic example of why nothing ever gets done in the province of British Columbia." It would become the campaign's most successful sound bite.

As a consequence, he led the Liberal Party to win 17 seats, its highest total since 1949. He was largely helped by moderate Socreds crossing over to vote Liberal. The Liberals vaulted from no seats to the Official Opposition in the legislature, relegating the ruling Social Credit Party to a distant third with seven seats. Wilson won his own seat in Powell River-Sunshine Coast.

In 1993, Wilson's leadership of the Liberals was challenged after it came to light that he was having an extramarital affair with fellow Liberal MLA Judi Tyabji, whom he had recently named as the party's House Leader. In a Liberal Party leadership review that had been called soon afterward, Wilson was defeated by Vancouver mayor Gordon Campbell. Within weeks, he and Tyabji left the Liberal caucus and formed a new party, the Progressive Democratic Alliance (PDA).

In the 1996 provincial election, Wilson retained his seat, while Tyabji, whom he later married, lost hers.

In 1999, Wilson shocked many in his party when he disbanded it and crossed the floor to join the governing NDP. As part of the deal, he joined Premier Glen Clark's cabinet as Minister of Aboriginal Affairs and Minister Responsible for BC Ferries. He was later appointed Minister of Finance and Corporate Relations after the resignation of Joy MacPhail, and then Minister of Education. He later served as Minister of Employment and Investment and as Minister of Forests.

He ran for the NDP's party leadership at a convention in February 2000, but pulled out of the race shortly before the voting began. He threw his support to candidate Corky Evans, who in turn lost to Ujjal Dosanjh. In the 2001 provincial election, he lost his seat to BC Liberal candidate Harold Long, previously a Social Credit MLA whom Wilson had defeated in 1991 when running for the BC Liberals.

After endorsing the BC Liberals in the 2013 provincial election, Premier Christy Clark appointed Wilson to a position titled LNG – Buy BC Advocate to promote for the development of an LNG industry in the province. The position was ended by the newly inaugurated NDP/Green government on 1 August 2017, a position for which he had been paid $150,000 per annum since 2013. In response to the public comments made following the termination Wilson launched a libel lawsuit, seeking $5 million in damages, against Premier John Horgan and Minister Bruce Ralston who implied he had not sufficiently provided report or briefing of his work, as well as federal Member of Parliament Rachel Blaney who questioned the value of the work relative to the salary in a Facebook post. Wilson later expanded the lawsuit to also name the CBC, radio station CKNW, and newspapers The Globe and Mail, The Vancouver Sun and Times Colonist who had all reported on the termination and subsequent comments. In June 2019, the case judge dismissed the portions claimed to have been lost acting as a future consultant or advocate for government or LNG-related organizations but permitted the case to be further considered to examine loss of income from the LNG – Buy BC Advocate position and costs of counselling.

== Other work ==
He has written A Civilized Revolution (1994) about his views on politics and public policy, and wrote, directed and produced Serving Thyme, a television comedy based on the west coast. After leaving politics, Wilson settled back in Powell River, and became chairman of the board of a software company. He is chairman of Blackberry Coast Capital Inc.

== Electoral record ==
2001 British Columbia general election: Powell River-Sunshine Coast
| Party | Candidate | Votes | % | ±% | Expenditures |
|---|---|---|---|---|---|
| Liberal | Harold Long | 9,904 | 42.36 | +24.65 | $63,954 |
| New Democratic | Gordon Wilson | 6,349 | 27.15 | -0.42 | $50,409 |
| Green | Adriane Carr | 6,316 | 27.01 | +24.66 | $24,821 |
| Marijuana | Dana Albert Larsen | 812 | 3.48 | New | $4,499 |
| Total valid votes | | 23,381 | 100 | – | |
| Total rejected ballots | | 99 | 0.43 | | |
| Turnout | | 23,480 | 72.43 | | |
| Registered voters | | | | | |

1996 British Columbia general election: Powell River-Sunshine Coast
| Party | Candidate | Votes | % | ±% | Expenditures |
|---|---|---|---|---|---|
| Progressive Democrat | Gordon Wilson | 10,833 | 49.05 | New | $18,579 |
| New Democratic | Bill Forst | 6,088 | 27.57 | -6.31 | $30,942 |
| Liberal | Cameron Reid | 3,911 | 17.71 | -36.98 | $31,957 |
| Reform | Don Atkinson | 677 | 3.07 | New | $10,560 |
| Green | D. Wendy Young | 518 | 2.35 | +1.58 | $834 |
| Common Sense | Roslyn Griston | 57 | 0.26 | New | $272 |
| Total valid votes | | 22,084 | 100 | – | |
| Total rejected ballots | | 66 | 0.30 | | |
| Turnout | | 22,150 | 75.37 | | |
| Registered voters | | | | | |

=== 1993 BC Liberal leadership challenge ===
Held on September 11, 1993.

- Gordon Campbell 4141
- Gordon Gibson 1600
- Gordon Wilson 531
- Linda Reid 166
- Wilf Hurd 62
- Allan Warnke 36
- Charles McKinney 4

1991 British Columbia general election: Powell River-Sunshine Coast
| Party | Candidate | Votes | % | Expenditures |
|---|---|---|---|---|
| Liberal | Gordon Wilson | 11,486 | 54.69 | $42,914 |
| New Democratic | Howard White | 7,117 | 33.88 | $56,523 |
| Social Credit | Harold Long | 2,174 | 10.35 | $26,527 |
| Green | Janet E. Calder | 161 | 0.77 | $439 |
| Common Sense | Roslyn Griston | 66 | 0.31 | $200 |
| Total valid votes | | 21,004 | 100 | |
| Total rejected ballots | | 300 | 1.41 | |
| Turnout | | 21,304 | 82.61 | |
| Registered voters | | | | |

British Columbia provincial by-election, March 15, 1989: Vancouver-Point Grey Resignation of Kim Campbell
| Party | Candidate | Votes | % | ±% |
|---|---|---|---|---|
| New Democratic | Tom Perry | 14,132 | 52.91 | – |
| Social Credit | Michael Levy | 6,435 | 24.09 | – |
| Liberal | Gordon Wilson | 5,449 | 20.40 | – |
| Green | Valerie Parker | 535 | 2.00 | – |
| Independent | Bob Seeman | 77 | 0.29 | – |
| Libertarian | Mary Anne Nylen | 58 | 0.22 | – |
| Human Race | Louis Lesosky | 16 | 0.06 | – |
| New Populist | Gerald Kirby | 8 | 0.03 | – |
| Total valid votes | | 26,710 | 99.64 | – |
| Total rejected ballots | | 96 | 0.36 | – |
| Turnout | | 26,806 | 46.37 | – |
| Eligible voters | | 57,813 | – | |
| New Democratic gain | | Swing | | – |
Source: Elections BC

1986 British Columbia general election: Mackenzie
| Party | Candidate | Votes | % | Expenditures |
|---|---|---|---|---|
| Social Credit | Harold Long | 8,530 | 43.68 | |
| New Democratic | Don Lockstead | 8,261 | 42.30 | |
| Liberal | Gordon Wilson | 2,739 | 14.02 | |
| Total valid votes | | 19,530 | 100 | |
| Total rejected ballots | | 350 | | |
| Turnout | | | | |
| Registered voters | | | | |
