= Bus Griffiths =

Canadian cartoonist (1913–2006)

- Born: Gilbert Joseph Griffiths; 1913 Moose Jaw, Saskatchewan, Canada
- Died: September 25, 2006 (aged 92–93) Comox, British Columbia, Canada
- Area: Cartoonist
- Notable works: Now You're Logging

Gilbert Joseph "Bus" Griffiths (1913 – September 25, 2006) was a cartoonist, lumberjack, and fisherman. He was best known for his graphic novel Now You're Logging, published 1978 by Harbour Publishing. Now You're Logging presented, in cartoon form, a complete look at the techniques, tools, and personalities of logging on the West Coast in the 1930s.

He began drawing cartoons while working as a logger, doing work for Vancouver's Maple Leaf Publishing during World War II and comic strips about logging for BC Lumberman magazine. He retired from logging in 1961 and began work as a commercial fisherman. In 1972 he began work on Now You're Logging to document logging in the era before modern technology. A complete picture is presented of the techniques and lives of the typical logger of the 1930s, with tree felling and log bucking, high climbers, chasers, choker setters, a hooktender, an accident and rescue in the woods, the use of the crosscut saw, rigging, a spar (tree), log transport on both truck and water, and operation of the steam donkey all shown and explained. This depiction of logging is interwoven with a love story involving one of the loggers and the daughter of a fishing family near their logging camp.

The Comics Journal said about the book in 1996: "a true anomaly: written and drawn by a man with decades of experience in the woods, it's a book with no clear antecedent, more intent on documenting a way of life than telling a story", adding "it might just change your perception of what comics are, what they can do, and why we need them."

He also illustrated the children's book Patrick and the Backhoe by Howard White (Nightwood Editions) and Bush Poems by Peter Trower (Harbour Publishing).

== Bibliography ==
- 1978: Now You're Logging (Harbour Publishing) ISBN 978-1-55017-033-7
- 1978: Bush Poems (Harbour Publishing) ISBN 0-920080-20-0
- 1991: Patrick and the Backhoe (Nightwood Editions) ISBN 978-0-88971-052-8
