= Judi Tyabji =

Canadian politician

Member of the Legislative Assembly of British Columbia
- In office 1991–1996
- Constituency: Okanagan East

Personal details
- Born: Judeline Kim Mary Tyabji; 2 January 1965 (age 61) Calcutta, India
- Party: Liberal (BC); Progressive Democratic Alliance
- Spouse(s): Gordon Wilson (m. 1994, div. 2022); Kim Sapartner (div.)
- Children: Kasimir, Kiri, Tanita
- Relatives: Tyabji family
- Education: University of Victoria

Judeline Kim Mary Tyabji (born 2 January 1965) is a former British Columbia politician, who was the youngest elected Member of the Legislative Assembly and the ex-wife of former provincial Leader of the Opposition Gordon Wilson.

== Early life ==
Tyabji was born on 2 January 1965 to the Tyabji family in Calcutta, India. Her family immigrated in the mid-1970s to Canada, first to Toronto then to Kelowna, where she attended Catholic elementary and high schools. Her father, Alan Tyabji, was an executive for Calona Wines, which owned Okanagan Vineyards Winery in Oliver, British Columbia. In 1986, she graduated from the University of Victoria with a degree in political science, then went to work as an assistant for the federal Liberal Party.

== Politics ==
After Gordon Wilson became leader of the provincial Liberal party in 1987, Tyabji became their regional representative. Shortly after her giving birth to her first child, she was their nominee for a by-election in Boundary-Similkameen. She lost her first election to the NDP's Bill Barlee, but raised the Liberal share of vote in the riding from 2 to 11 percent. After Jean Chrétien became the federal Liberal leader, she briefly switched to the NDP then returned to the provincial Liberals when they disconnected from the federal party in 1991.

When she was 26 years old and pregnant with her third child, Tyabji earned what was described as a "surprise victory" in her first election win in October 1991 by defeating a Social Credit cabinet minister and a prominent NDP activist to become the MLA for the newly created riding of Okanagan East. Tyabji was the only Liberal elected in the province's Interior region that year and in the Okanagan since before World War II. She was the youngest MLA on record at the time and the first to give birth while in office. She was also appointed her party's environment critic.

=== Wilson affair ===
She served as an MLA for Okanagan East from 1991 to 1996, including sitting with the British Columbia Liberal Party from 1991 until 1993, when Wilson's leadership of the Liberals was challenged after it came to light that he was having an extramarital affair with Tyabji, whom he had recently named as the party's house leader. Wilson and Tyabji retained their seats in the Legislature and sat as members of a new party, the Progressive Democratic Alliance. Wilson and Tyabji then married in 1994, the same year she lost custody of her three children to her ex-husband.

In the 1996 provincial election, Wilson retained his seat, while Tyabji lost hers. In 1997, Wilson crossed the floor to join the British Columbia New Democratic Party government of Glen Clark as minister of finance and minister of employment, investment and international trade. He subsequently folded his party, the PDA.

== After provincial politics ==
After leaving politics she hosted a daily talk show on Victoria-based CHEK-TV until suing CHEK for breach of contract in 1998. Tyabji ran for municipal council for Powell River in 1999 and topped the polls, then served as councillor for two years and as director of the regional district. On council, she was chair of the planning committee, chair of parks, recreation and culture, and chair of the Waterfront Development Committee, which oversaw the revitalization of the Westview Harbour and many other downtown amenities. She was a co-founder and CEO of a software company from 2004 to 2012 and has been a management consultant in multimedia and business development since 1996.

In 2008, Tyabji, her firm Tugboat Enterprises, and The Province newspaper were sued for defamation by Blair Wilson (no relation to Gordon Wilson) who was the federal Member of Parliament for West Vancouver—Sunshine Coast—Sea to Sky Country and who later lost his attempt at re-election. This multiparty litigation continued until a 56-day trial began in 2015, ending in 2016, and resulting in a complete dismissal of all allegations against both Tyabji and Tugboat in 2017 by Madame Justice Dardi.

In 2018, Tyabji's son Kaz pleaded guilty to intention to possess a controlled substance, a reduced charge from the original high-profile charge of importation of fentanyl made against him in 2015. He had been refused bail, despite having no prior record, on 'tertiary grounds' and the RCMP held a news conference announcing the importation charge while he was in the Calgary Remand Centre, where he was held without bail for almost six months. He was previously charged with assault. She expressed pride for his guilty plea online.

== Publications ==
- Political Affairs (1994), her first book on BC politics, which includes a chapter on public policy by Gordon Wilson.
- Daggers Unsheathed: The Political Assassination of Glen Clark (2002), about the fall of former BC NDP leader Glen Clark.
- Behind The Smile (2016), a biography of then-BC-Premier Christy Clark.
- That's Rich: The Rise and Fall of the BC Liberals (2024), follows former Deputy Premier and Solicitor General Rich Coleman from the 1980s as a Social Credit volunteer, through the governing years of the BC Liberals to their disappearance in 2023 Rich Coleman.
- Sgaana Jaad: April White, Killer Whale Woman (2008), is a coffee table art book of renowned Haida artist April White. Haida Gwaii.

== Election results ==
1996 British Columbia general election: Okanagan East
Party	Candidate	Votes	%
Liberal	John Weisbeck	9,382	38.37%
Progressive Democrat	Judi Tyabji	6,432	26.30%
New Democratic	Janet Elizabeth Gooch	5,176	21.17%
Reform	Paul Halonen	3,116	12.74%
Green	Dave Cursons	347	1.47%
Total valid votes		24,453	
Total rejected ballots		108	

B.C. General Election 1991: Okanagan-East
Party	Candidate	Votes	%	±%
Liberal	Judi Tyabji	8,578	38.47	
Social Credit	Larry Chalmers	7,896	35.41	
New Democratic	Eileen M. Robinson	5,825	26.12	
Total Valid Votes		22,299	100.00	
Total rejected ballots		349		

1988 By-Election: Boundary-Similkameen
Party	Candidate	Votes	%	±%
New Democratic	Bill Barlee	15,778	52.82	
Social Credit	Russ Fox	10,585	35.44	
Liberal	Judi Tyabji	3,144	10.53	
Green	Rus Domer	361	1.21	
Total Valid Votes		29,868	100.00	
Total rejected ballots		87		
