= Centre for Sustainability =

Educational organization at the University of British Columbia

The Continuing Studies Centre for Sustainability (CFS) is an educational organization at the University of British Columbia (UBC). The Centre's aim is to bring academic and industry expertise to the wider community by providing sustainability education and training programs for individuals, organizations and communities. Former British Columbia Premier and Vancouver Mayor Mike Harcourt – a long-time advocate of sustainable cities and communities – is the associate director of the Centre.

== Programs ==
Programs at the Centre for Sustainability include:

- Sustainability Management Program, for individuals who wish to take the lead in helping to build sustainability into their organizations.
- Summer Institute in Sustainability Leadership, an award-winning one-week professional development program focused on developing organization-wide sustainability policies, procedures and projects.
- Certificate in Decision Making for Climate Change, an online program offered jointly with three partner universities with the aim of providing students with the most up-to-date knowledge on climate change issues, including how to develop and implement an effective response plan.
- Green Building and LEED Credentials, in-depth professional development courses in Passive House construction and courses on green building and the LEED certification system.

UBC Continuing Studies units also collaborate with community partners to offer free public lectures and podcasts that share perspectives and encourage debate on sustainability topics.

== Leadership ==
- Mike Harcourt, Associate Director
- William Koty, Director
- Katie Jane Morrell, Program Leader
- Diana McKenzie, Program Leader

== Educational aims ==
- Vision: A world that understands, desires, and pursues sustainability.
- Mission: To serve as a catalyst for empowering people and mobilizing ideas, resources and organizations to help encourage sustainable communities, locally and globally. In pursuit of this mission, we commit to engage and inform adult learners by developing relevant and inspirational educational programs that responds to the emerging opportunities, challenges and needs in the field of sustainability, and that leverage expertise and relationships from UBC and the wider community.
