= Poverty law =

Law relating to Poverty

Harvard Law defines poverty law as, "the legal statutes, regulations and cases that apply particularly to the financially poor in his or her day to day life". In a commonsense understanding and in practice, the goal of poverty law is to protect the disadvantaged poor from unfair treatment by the law. Poverty law often overlaps with federal benefits and welfare policies. Pertinent federal government benefits include Medicaid; cash public assistance (more commonly known as Welfare); and the Supplemental Nutrition Assistance Program (SNAP) program, previously known as the food stamps program. Poverty law frequently involves questions of administrative law, civil rights law, constitutional law, employment law, and health law.

== See also ==
- Southern Poverty Law Center
