= Nicholas Simons =

Canadian politician

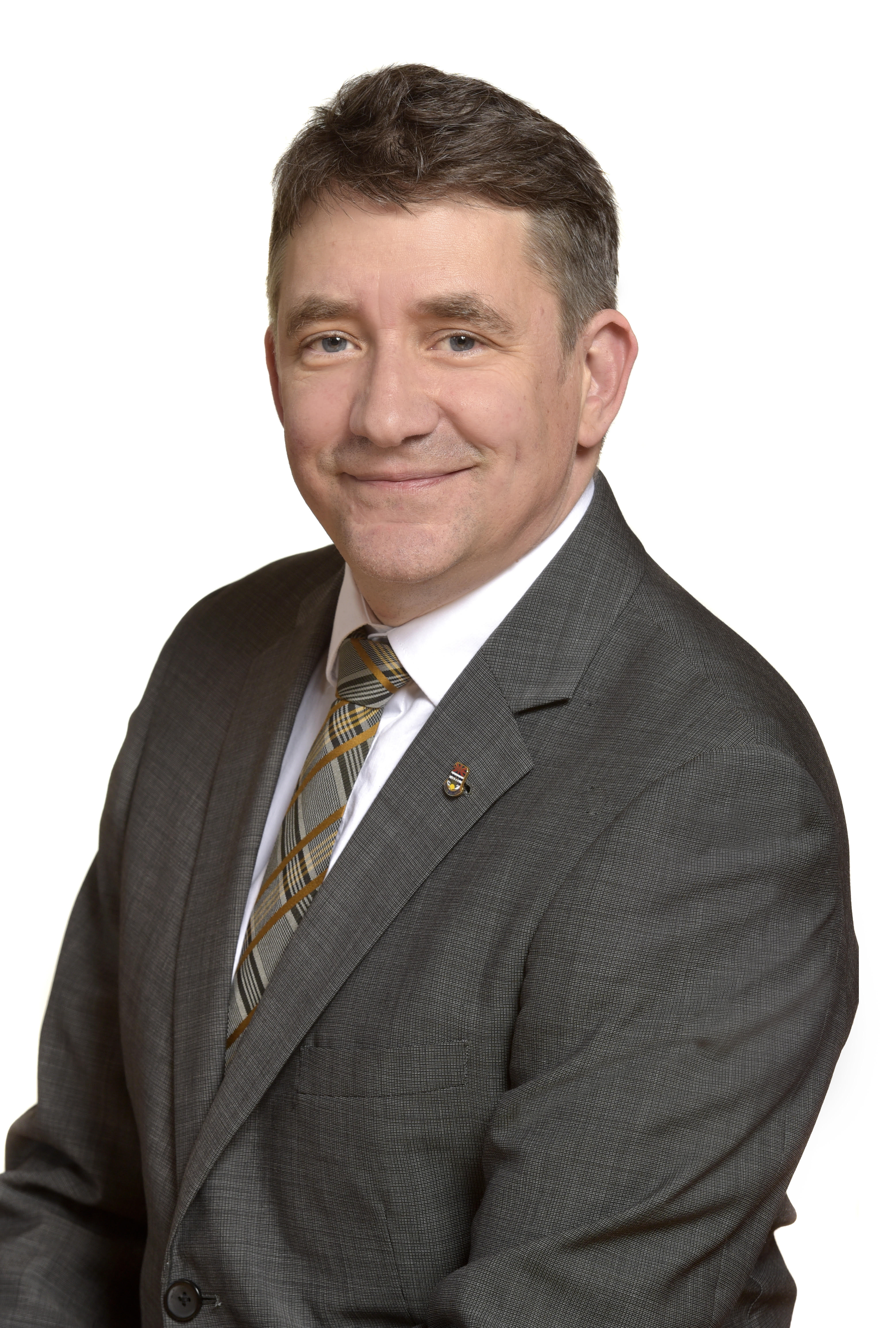

Minister of Social Development and Poverty Reduction of British Columbia
- In office November 26, 2020 – December 7, 2022
- Premier: John Horgan; David Eby
- Preceded by: Shane Simpson
- Succeeded by: Sheila Malcolmson

Member of the British Columbia Legislative Assembly for Powell River-Sunshine Coast
- In office May 17, 2005 – October 19, 2024
- Preceded by: Harold Long
- Succeeded by: Randene Neill

Personal details
- Born: 1964 or 1965 (age 61–62)
- Party: New Democrat
- Domestic partner: Scott Scobbie
- Education: University of Ottawa; Simon Fraser University

Nicholas Simons is a Canadian politician. He was the Member of the Legislative Assembly (MLA) of British Columbia, representing the riding of Powell River-Sunshine Coast from 2005 until 2024, as a member of the New Democratic Party.

== Early life and career ==
Simons grew up in Montreal, with his musician father Jan Simons teaching at McGill University. He studied criminology at university, graduating with a bachelor's degree from University of Ottawa and master's degree from Simon Fraser University.

Before entering politics, Simons worked as a child-protection social worker for the Ministry for Children and Family Development, as a financial assistance worker, and as the crime prevention coordinator for the Northwest Territories. He has been a consultant for the federal, Northwest Territories and First Nations governments in areas of law reform and child welfare.

He served as the executive director of health and social development for the Sechelt Nation from 1997 until 2005. In this role he oversaw health, child welfare, alcohol and drugs, financial assistance and justice programs. He also negotiated funding for innovative preventative health and social services.

== Politics ==
Simons was a candidate for the New Democratic Party in the 2004 federal election, running in the riding of West Vancouver–Sunshine Coast-Sea to Sky Country. While he finished third, the experience convinced him to run as a candidate for the British Columbia New Democratic Party (BC NDP) in the provincial election the following year, in which he was elected MLA for Powell River-Sunshine Coast. He was re-elected in 2009, 2013, 2017 and 2020. He was one of four openly gay members of the provincial legislature.

In the legislature, Simons has served as chair of the Caucus Social Policy Committee, critic for Tourism, Sport and the Arts, and as critic for the Ministry for Children and Family Development.

He is rumoured to be one of thirteen provincial caucus members who forced the resignation of Carole James from her position as leader of the BC NDP. James announced her resignation on December 6, 2010, after consulting with a group of caucus members opposed to her continued leadership. Simons declared his candidacy in the subsequent leadership race on January 5, 2011, but withdrew on April 7 and threw his support behind John Horgan.

On November 26, 2020, he was appointed Minister of Social Development and Poverty Reduction. With the announcement of Premier David Eby's new cabinet on December 7, 2022, Simons was replaced in that role by Sheila Malcolmson, and was instead named NDP caucus chair. On September 1, 2023, he announced that he would not seek reelection in the next provincial election, and was succeeded by Randene Neill.

== Electoral record ==
2020 British Columbia general election: Powell River-Sunshine Coast
| Party | Candidate | Votes | % | ±% | Expenditures |
|---|---|---|---|---|---|
| New Democratic | Nicholas Simons | 12,701 | 50.88 | +0.18 | $36,504.80 |
| Green | Kim Darwin | 8,104 | 32.47 | +8.30 | $18,011.22 |
| Liberal | Sandra Stoddart-Hansen | 4,156 | 16.65 | −7.88 | $15,266.38 |
| Total valid votes | | 24,961 | 99.28 | – | |
| Total rejected ballots | | 182 | 0.72 | +0.43 | |
| Turnout | | 25,143 | 59.98 | –9.63 | |
| Registered voters | | 41,921 | | | |
| New Democratic hold | | Swing | | –4.06 | |
Source: Elections BC

2017 British Columbia general election: Powell River-Sunshine Coast
| Party | Candidate | Votes | % | ±% | Expenditures |
|---|---|---|---|---|---|
| New Democratic | Nicholas Simons | 13,646 | 50.70 | −4.50 | $42,438 |
| Liberal | Mathew Wilson | 6,602 | 24.53 | −8.25 | $65,433 |
| Green | Kim Darwin | 6,505 | 24.17 | +12.15 | $20,298 |
| Cascadia | Reuben Richards | 160 | 0.60 | – | $125 |
| Total valid votes | | 26,913 | 100.00 | – | |
| Total rejected ballots | | 78 | 0.29 | −0.10 | |
| Turnout | | 26,991 | 69.60 | +6.36 | |
| Registered voters | | 38,778 | | | |
Source: Elections BC

2013 British Columbia general election: Powell River-Sunshine Coast
| Party | Candidate | Votes | % | ±% | Expenditures |
|---|---|---|---|---|---|
| New Democratic | Nicholas Simons | 13,120 | 55.20 | -3.08 | $66,335 |
| Liberal | Patrick Muncaster | 7,792 | 32.78 | -1.54 | $41,207 |
| Green | Richard Carl Till | 2,856 | 12.02 | +5.72 | $4,537 |
| Total valid votes | | 23,768 | 100.00 | | |
| Total rejected ballots | | 92 | 0.39 | | |
| Turnout | | 23,860 | 63.24 | | |
Source: Elections BC

2009 British Columbia general election: Powell River-Sunshine Coast
| Party | Candidate | Votes | % | ±% | Expenditures |
|---|---|---|---|---|---|
| New Democratic | Nicholas Simons | 13,276 | 58.28 | +14.83 | $66,566 |
| Liberal | Dawn Miller | 7,818 | 34.32 | +4.17 | $102,008 |
| Green | Jeff Chilton | 1,436 | 6.30 | -19.48 | $350 |
| Refederation | Allen McIntyre | 249 | 1.10 | +0.48 | $1,110 |
| Total valid votes | | 22,779 | 100 | – | |
| Total rejected ballots | | 102 | 0.45 | | |
| Turnout | | 22,881 | 63.02 | | |
| Registered voters | | | | | |

2005 British Columbia general election: Powell River-Sunshine Coast
| Party | Candidate | Votes | % | ±% | Expenditures |
|---|---|---|---|---|---|
| New Democratic | Nicholas Simons | 11,099 | 43.45 | +26.30 | $108,403 |
| Liberal | Maureen Clayton | 7,702 | 30.15 | -12.21 | $102,008 |
| Green | Adriane Carr | 6,585 | 25.78 | -1.23 | $350 |
| Refederation | Allen McIntyre | 249 | 0.62 | New | $1,110 |
| Total valid votes | | 25,542 | 100 | – | |
| Total rejected ballots | | 109 | 0.43 | | |
| Turnout | | 25,651 | 72.43 | | |
| Registered voters | | | | | |

2004 Canadian federal election: West Vancouver—Sunshine Coast—Sea to Sky Country
| Party | Candidate | Votes | % | ±% | Expenditures |
|---|---|---|---|---|---|
| Conservative | John Reynolds | 21,372 | 35.29 | -22.04 | $81,933 |
| Liberal | Blair Wilson | 19,685 | 32.51 | +5.91 | $81,023 |
| New Democratic | Nicholas Simons | 13,156 | 21.72 | +15.43 | $29,779 |
| Green | Andrea Goldsmith | 5,887 | 9.72 | +4.83 | $28,167 |
| Canadian Action | Marc Bombois | 321 | 0.53 | -1.30 | $117 |
| Marxist–Leninist | Anne Jamieson | 123 | 0.20 | – | |
| Total valid votes | | 60,544 | 100.0 | | |
| Total rejected ballots | | 139 | 0.23 | -0.06 | |
| Turnout | | 60,683 | 66.00 | +2.81 | |
| Conservative notional hold | | Swing | | -13.98 | |
Conservative change is from the combination of Progressive Conservative and Canadian Alliance vote.

== Personal life ==
Simons is a cellist, whose musical credits include several tracks on Rise Against's 2004 album Siren Song of the Counter Culture. Simons and Vancouver mayor Gregor Robertson both perform on country-punk musician Slim Milkie's 2010 album Silverado; Milkie, whose real name is Scott Scobbie, is Simons's partner.

British Columbia provincial government of John Horgan
Cabinet post (1)
| Predecessor | Office | Successor |
|---|---|---|
| Shane Simpson | Minister of Social Development and Poverty Reduction; 26 November 2020 – 7 December 2022 | Sheila Malcolmson |
