= Get Your Drugs Tested =

Public drug checking service

Get Your Drugs Tested is a free public drug checking service located in Vancouver, Canada.

== History ==
Get Your Drugs Tested receives no public funding, and is entirely supported by The Medicinal Cannabis Dispensary.

They use FTIR Spectrometers in conjunction with fentanyl, Lysergamides and Benzodiazepine test strips to offer free analysis of any drug or substance at their storefront or by mail.

In January 2021, they announced they had analyzed over 10,000 samples. In June 2021, they announced they had analyzed 15,000 samples. In March 2022, they announced they had analyzed 25,000 samples. In July 2022, they announced they had analyzed 30,000 samples. By October 2023, the service had analyzed over 50,000 samples. All of their drug analysis results are posted to their website in a searchable database.

The service has received extensive media coverage.

== See also ==
- Counterfeit drug
- Drug education
- Drug test
- Harm reduction
- Reagent testing
