= Mike Harcourt =

Premier of British Columbia from 1991 to 1996

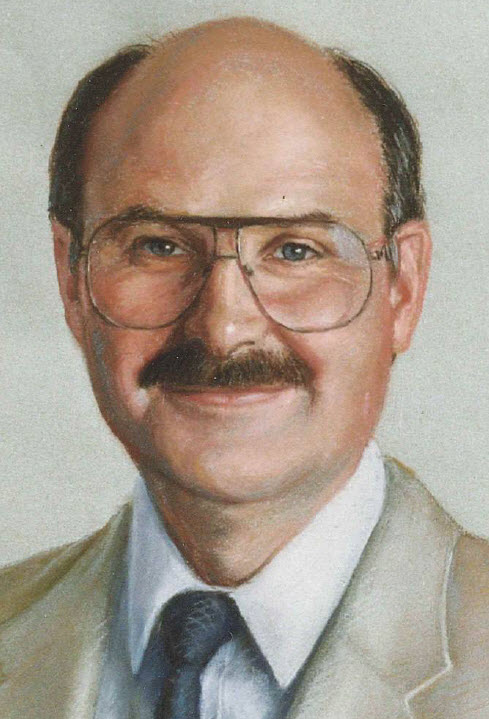

30th Premier of British Columbia
- In office November 5, 1991 – February 22, 1996
- Monarch: Elizabeth II
- Lieutenant Governor: David Lam; Garde Gardom
- Deputy: Anita Hagen; Elizabeth Cull
- Preceded by: Rita Johnston
- Succeeded by: Glen Clark

Leader of the Opposition of British Columbia
- In office April 12, 1987 – November 5, 1991
- Preceded by: Bob Skelly
- Succeeded by: Gordon Wilson

Leader of the British Columbia New Democratic Party
- In office April 12, 1987 – February 22, 1996
- Preceded by: Bob Skelly
- Succeeded by: Glen Clark

Member of the British Columbia Legislative Assembly for Vancouver-Mount Pleasant Vancouver Centre (1986-1991)
- In office October 22, 1986 – May 28, 1996 Serving with Emery Barnes (1986-1991)
- Preceded by: Gary Lauk; Emery Barnes
- Succeeded by: Jenny Kwan

34th Mayor of Vancouver
- In office January 1, 1981 – December 8, 1986
- Preceded by: Jack Volrich
- Succeeded by: Gordon Campbell

Personal details
- Born: Michael Franklin Harcourt; January 6, 1943 (age 83) Edmonton, Alberta
- Party: The Electors' Action Movement (municipal; until 1976); Civic Independents (municipal; 1984–1986); New Democratic
- Spouse: Becky Harcourt
- Education: University of British Columbia (BA & LLB)
- Occupation: Politician
- Profession: Lawyer

Michael Franklin Harcourt OC (born January 6, 1943) is a Canadian lawyer and politician who served as the 30th premier of British Columbia from 1991 to 1996, and before that as the 34th mayor of Vancouver, British Columbia's largest city, from 1980 to 1986.

== Early life and education ==
Harcourt was student council president at Sir Winston Churchill Secondary School and studied at the University of British Columbia, where he graduated BA and LLB. He founded the Vancouver Community Legal Assistance Society, serving as its director from 1969 to 1971.

== Municipal politics ==
Harcourt served as a Vancouver alderman from 1973 to 1980. He was first elected as a member of the Electors' Action Movement (TEAM). He left the party in 1976 after he lost the party's nomination for mayor to Jack Volrich. He was Mayor of Vancouver from 1980 to 1986. As mayor, his term in office was dominated by planning for Expo 86, an event that saw many new developments come to the city, and an event he adamantly opposed coming to the city in the first place.

Mayor Michael Harcourt was the very first Mayor in any city to declare an Animal Rights Day (Proclamation at lifeforcefoundation.org) It was August 3, 1983 and hereafter as requested by Peter Hamilton, Lifeforce Foundation.

== Provincial politics and premiership ==
He was first elected to the British Columbia Legislature in the 1986 British Columbia election. He became the leader of the British Columbia New Democratic Party (NDP) and the leader of the Official Opposition in the following year. He was considered to be a moderate within the ranks of his social democratic party.

In the 1991 provincial election, Harcourt led the NDP back to power, defeating the Social Credit party led by Rita Johnston. That marked the second time that the NDP had ever been in power in British Columbia (BC) and the first since 1975.

On taking office, Harcourt's government increased the basic rate of monthly social assistance by 5%, from $500 to $525. By 1993, it had reached $535 per month, coupled with increases in other rates and a relaxation of means testing of applicants. As Ralph Klein introduced severe spending cuts in neighbouring Alberta, Harcourt accused him in December 1993 of driving Albertan welfare recipients into British Columbia. An increase in out-of-province applications for income assistance and surge in welfare rolls and spending (The Vancouver Sun noted in 1993 that almost 10% of the population were claiming social assistance), coupled with a shift towards an intolerant view of welfare fraud in Canadian politics, affected the government's standing. A controversial news story about welfare fraud among British Columbia's Somali Canadian community, after the government had denied that system abuse was taking place, further hurt its standing.

Harcourt reacted by abandoning his social democratic policy and moving to the right on welfare. He fired Joan Smallwood as Minister of Social Services, replaced her with Joy MacPhail, reduced welfare rates, and made it more difficult for families to claim assistance. Announcing the policy shift in September 1993, he infamously described it as a crackdown on "cheats, deadbeats and varmints". He later expressed regret for those comments by blaming a "relentless" coverage of welfare fraud causes by the media for the action. The resulting BC Benefits welfare reform package, which included budget cuts, new restrictions, and a reduction in the basic rate to $500 per month, the same it had been when Harcourt took office, proved hard to accept for the NDP and had a lasting effect on its reputation by hampering its attempts to condemn later governments for undertaking similar welfare crackdowns.

The NDP government under Harcourt entered into a contract with Carrier Lumber to build roads and construct new mills to handle an increased volume of wood because of the infestation of the mountain pine beetle. On May 13, 1992, Harcourt ignored the contract between his government and Carrier Lumber and promised several First Nations that no timber would be harvested and that no roads would be built without their agreement. Phillip Halkett, deputy minister of forests, testified at trial, "The Premier had no authority to make that promise." The courts awarded Carrier Lumber $156 million and ruled that there had been a deliberate attempt to destroy the company and that government officials had conspired to withhold 2,000 pages of documents in an attempt to defeat Carrier's damage suit. Justice Glenn Parrett of the Supreme Court of British Columbia in his reasons stated of the NDP government, "It is difficult to conceive of a more compelling and cynical example of duplicity and bad faith."

Harcourt resigned as premier in February 1996 as the result of "Bingogate", a scandal in which David Stupich, a former NDP member of the Legislative Assembly (MLA) and member of Parliament (MP) from BC, used money raised by a charity bingo to fund the party. While it was determined by a BC Ministry of Justice special prosecutor that Harcourt was not directly responsible for the scandal, he took political responsibility for it. He was succeeded as premier by Glen Clark in 1996. He did not run for another term as MLA in the 1996 British Columbia general election; Jenny Kwan succeeded him as the NDP candidate and later MLA of Vancouver-Mount Pleasant.

Harcourt's challenges as premier, with both the legislature and the media, were chronicled in Vancouver journalist Daniel Gawthrop's book Highwire Act: Power, Pragmatism, and the Harcourt Legacy, which was published shortly after his resignation as the NDP was preparing for the leadership convention in which Clark was named his successor.

== Post-politics ==
After serving as premier, Harcourt became associated with the University of British Columbia (UBC). He was involved in research relating to sustainable development and cities.

Harcourt was severely injured in a near-fatal fall at his cottage on Pender Island in November 2002, which resulted in a severe spinal-cord injury. After 13 years as a partial quadriplegic, he describes 20 percent of his body as still paralyzed. The former premier received a widespread outpouring of empathy and support from his fellow British Columbians and his rapid recovery astonished doctors. He spent several months at the world-renowned GF Strong facility. He later published a book about his ordeal, called Plan B.

He was named as a special advisor to Prime Minister Paul Martin on cities on December 12, 2003.

His book City Making in Paradise was released in August 2007.

In November 2007, he received an honorary doctoral degree in law (LLD) from UBC. In February 2009, he was appointed associate director of the new UBC Continuing Studies Centre for Sustainability, where his mandate was to contribute to the development of educational programs that emphasized practical knowledge in tackling climate change and other sustainability issues.

In 2008, Harcourt became a key adviser to then–newly elected mayor of Vancouver Gregor Robertson, including topics about transparency and transportation.

In 2011, Harcourt joined five other former mayors of Vancouver to urge the federal government to halt its efforts to close Insite.

In the January 31, 2014, issue of High Country News Harcourt stated he was recruited in the 1960s by an activist group to oppose a freeway that would have connected the Trans-Canada Highway to downtown Vancouver. "'You've been hired to stop the freeway'", he recalled being told.

Harcourt revealed in April 2014 that he had allowed his NDP membership to lapse and now considers himself an independent. "I don't know whether it's a trial separation or a decree absolute", he told the Globe and Mail in an interview. Harcourt cited several complaints against his former party, including former leader Adrian Dix's decision to oppose the Kinder Morgan pipeline and the party's general disposition against mining, logging and other resource-extraction industries, the party's 2009 opposition to the BC Liberal government's proposed carbon tax, and the 2010 caucus revolt that forced the resignation of then-leader Carole James.

Harcourt had repeatedly supported the legalization of cannabis and, in May 2014, announced that he would be an advisor to True Leaf Medicine, a Vernon-based start-up company seeking Health Canada approval to produce and sell medicinal marijuana. Harcourt admitted previous personal use of marijuana in the 1960s and 1970s.

Harcourt endorsed Mark Carney, leader of the Liberal Party, during the 2025 Canadian federal election.

Harcourt endorsed Alberta MP Heather McPherson in the 2026 New Democratic Party leadership election.

== Awards and honours ==
Ribbon	Description	Notes
	Officer of the Order of Canada	Decoration awarded in 2012
	Queen Elizabeth II Golden Jubilee Medal	Decoration awarded in 2002; Canadian version
	Queen Elizabeth Diamond Jubilee Medal	Decoration awarded in 2012; Canadian version
	King Charles III Coronation Medal	Decoration awarded in 2025; Canadian version
