= Progressive Democratic Alliance =

Political party in British Columbia (1993–1999)

- Leader: Gordon Wilson
- Founder: Gordon Wilson
- Founded: 1993
- Dissolved: 1999
- Succeeded by: British Columbia Democratic Alliance
- Ideology: Centrist populism
- Political position: Centre

The Progressive Democratic Alliance (PDA) was a centrist political party in British Columbia, Canada. It was founded by Gordon Wilson, who at the time of the party's founding in 1993 represented Powell River–Sunshine Coast in the Legislative Assembly.

Wilson, previously the leader of the British Columbia Liberal Party, led that party through a breakthrough in the provincial election of 1991, in which they rose from no parliamentary representation to official opposition status. He was unable to hold his caucus together, however, and was forced to call a leadership convention following revelations about his personal relationship with another member of the small Liberal caucus, Judi Tyabji, MLA for Okanagan East. Tyabji and Wilson were both married to others at the time; they subsequently divorced and married each other. Many in the Liberal Party believed that their relationship created at least the potential for a serious conflict of interest.

After losing the leadership challenge to Gordon Campbell, who in turn would lead the party to victory in the 2001 provincial election, Wilson and Tyabji left the party to establish the Progressive Democratic Alliance on December 5, 1993.

In the subsequent June 26, 1996 general election, Wilson retained his seat, while all 65 other PDA candidates, including Tyabji, were defeated. The party won a total of 90,797 votes, or 5.74% of the popular vote.

The PDA was disbanded by Wilson in 1999 when he joined the ruling New Democratic Party of British Columbia to become a member of Cabinet. He later ran for the provincial NDP leadership, but lost to Ujjal Dosanjh. He lost his legislative seat in the 2001 provincial election.

In 2004, former party activists attempted to resuscitate the PDA. Finding financial obstacles, they instead formed the British Columbia Democratic Alliance, billing it as a successor organization.

== Electoral results ==
Election	Leader	Candidates	Seats		Votes			
Election	Leader	Candidates	Seats won	+/−	Place	Votes	%	Change
1996	Gordon Wilson	66 / 75	1 / 75	▲1	▲4th	90,797	5.74%	▲5.74%

== See also ==
- List of Canadian political parties
