= 1991 British Columbia general election =

Canadian provincial election

- October 17, 1991

75 seats of the Legislative Assembly of British Columbia 38 seats were needed for a majority
- Turnout: 64.03% ▼1.77 pp
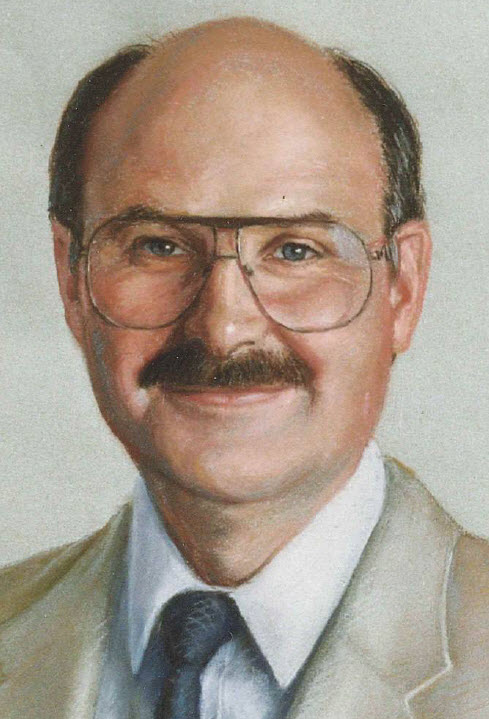
	First party	Second party	Third party
		BCL	SC
Leader	Mike Harcourt	Gordon Wilson	Rita Johnston
Party	New Democratic	Liberal	Social Credit
Leader since	1987	1987	1991
Leader's seat	Vancouver-Mount Pleasant	Powell River-Sunshine Coast	Surrey-Newton (lost re-election)
Last election	22 seats	0 seats	47 seats
Seats won	51	17	7
Seat change	▲29	▲17	▼40
Popular vote	595,391	486,208	351,660
Percentage	40.71%	33.25	24.27
Swing	▼1.89	▲26.51	▼25.27
Premier before election
Rita Johnston
Social Credit
Premier after election
Mike Harcourt
New Democratic

The 1991 British Columbia general election was the 35th provincial election in the Province of British Columbia, Canada. It was held to elect members of the Legislative Assembly of British Columbia. The election was called on September 19, 1991, and held on October 17, 1991.

The New Democratic Party of Mike Harcourt defeated the incumbent Social Credit Party of British Columbia, which had been beset by scandals during Bill Vander Zalm's only term as premier. Liberal Party leader Gordon Wilson surprised observers by leading his party to winning one-third of the votes cast and 23 percent of the seats, and forming the official opposition in the legislature after having held no seats at all since 1979. The new legislature met for the first time on March 17, 1992.

The election was held at the same time as a referendum on recall and initiative. It was also the first British Columbia general election with only single-member districts.

== Background ==
Under Vander Zalm's leadership, Socred's control shifted from urban fiscal conservatives to social conservatives. Vander Zalm seemingly cruised to victory in the 1986 provincial election, held just a month after he was sworn in. In truth, however, a number of more moderate Socreds were not comfortable with the party's rightward turn on social issues, and began defecting to the BC Liberals.

This process was exacerbated by Vander Zalm's eccentricity, and the constant scandals that plagued his government. As well, Vander Zalm allowed his principal secretary, David Poole, to amass a substantial amount of power, despite being unelected.

Vander Zalm resigned in April 1991 amid a conflict of interest scandal surrounding the sale of a theme park that he owned. Socred members elected the lesser-known Deputy Premier Rita Johnston, a close ally of Vander Zalm, to be their new leader, over Grace McCarthy, a longtime associate of former Premier Bill Bennett. Many viewed this as a mistake, as Johnston was close to the Vander Zalm legacy; even NDP leader Mike Harcourt admitted later that he preferred Johnston over McCarthy, as the latter would be a much tougher opponent in an election.

== Campaign ==
Johnston had little time to make up ground in the polls or distance herself from the now-detested Vander Zalm. Additionally, the Socreds were still bitterly divided over the bruising leadership contest. The NDP went into the elections as heavy favourites after leading in opinion polls for almost four years.

The Liberals, who had not been represented in the legislature since 1979, gained slightly in the polls due to great resentment against the ruling Socreds and skepticism towards the NDP. A turning point came when Wilson successfully took legal action to be included in the televised leaders' debate, which took place on October 8. During the debate Johnston and Harcourt exchanged many bitter attacks, while Wilson, still not considered a serious contender, was able to successfully portray himself as an "outsider" who was above the partisan bickering of the other two parties. Liberal support surged dramatically as a result of Wilson's performance. One of the memorable moments of the debate came as Harcourt and Johnston argued loudly amongst each other, when Wilson pointed towards them and declared, "Here's a classic example of why nothing ever gets done in the province of British Columbia."

== Opinion polls ==
Last day of poll	New Democratic	Liberal	Social Credit	Others	Pollster	Sample	Margin	Source
Results	40.7	33.3	24.1	1.9				
October 10, 1991	38	30	29	3	Angus Reid	1,004	± 3,1	
September 25, 1991	48 (39)	11 (9)	39 (32)	2 (2)	—N/a	—N/a	—N/a	
July 15, 1990	47	8	36	9	Angus Reid	801	± 3,5	
January 21, 1990	49	—N/a	43	—N/a	Angus Reid	470	± 4,2	
April 25, 1989	53	10	32	5	Angus Reid	807	± 3,5	
April 20, 1989	48	11	35	6	Marktrend	—N/a	—N/a	
November 4, 1988	43	18	34	5	Marktrend	—N/a	—N/a	
October 1, 1988	41	—N/a	23	—N/a	Goldfarb	1,000	± 3,0	
November 29, 1987	46 (31)	6 (4)	40 (27)	7 (5)	—N/a	475	± 4,5	
1986 Elections	42.6	6.7	49.3	1.4				

=== Riding-specific polls ===
==== Oak Bay-Gordon Head by-election ====
Evolution of voting intentions at provincial level
Polling firm	Last day of survey	Source	BCNDP	BCSC	BCLP	Other	ME	Sample
By-election 1989	December 13, 1989		45.26	43.68	9.11	1.94		
Angus Reid	December 1989		52	38	—N/a	—N/a	—N/a	—N/a
Angus Reid	December 1989		45	41	—N/a	—N/a	—N/a	400
McIntyre & Mustel	December 7, 1989		49	44	4	—N/a	5.0	350
Election 1986	December 13, 1989		35.91	52.50	2.38	9.21		

== Results ==
The Socreds were swept from power in a massive NDP landslide. This was not due to the NDP winning a higher percentage of the vote as much as it was due to Socred support collapsing in favour of the BC Liberals, splitting the vote. The defeat was magnified by moderate Socred supporters voting Liberal, continuing a shift that dated to early in Vander Zalm's tenure. The combined effect was to decimate the Socred caucus, which was reduced from 47 members to only seven—only three over the minimum for official party status. Johnston herself lost her own seat in Surrey-Newton to NDP challenger Penny Priddy, and all but five members of her cabinet were defeated.

The Liberals returned to the legislature as the official opposition after a 12-year absence, replacing Social Credit as the main alternative to the NDP in the province.

Party	Party leader	# of candidates	Seats			Popular vote		
Party	Party leader	# of candidates	1986	Elected	% change	#	%	% change
New Democrats	Michael Harcourt	75	22	51	+131.8%	595,391	40.71%	−1.89%
Liberal	Gordon Wilson	71	—	17		486,208	33.25%	+26.51%
Social Credit	Rita Johnston	74	47	7	−85.1%	351,660	24.27%	−25.27%
Green		42	—	—	—	12,650	0.86%	+0.62%
Independents		16	—	—	—	10,281	0.70%	+0.57%
Reform	Ron Gamble	4	*	—	*	2,673	0.18%	*
Family Coalition		8	*	—	*	1,310	0.09%	*
Libertarian		11	—	—	—	860	0.06%	+0.04%
Western Canada Concept	Doug Christie	5	—	—	—	651	0.04%	+0.02%
Conservative	Peter B. Macdonald (Note: Macdonald was not eligible to run as a candidate in 1991. He moved to Canada at the age of 10 and only discovered during the election campaign that he was a British subject and had never obtained his Canadian citizenship.)	4	—	—	—	426	0.03%	−0.70%
Human Race		2	*	—	*	110	0.01%	*
Green Go (Green Wing/Rhino)		1	*	—	*	93	0.01%	*
Communist League		3	—	—	—	92	0.01%	−0.02%
Interdependence Party		1	*	—	*	62	x	*
Total		317	69	75	+8.7%	1,462,467	100%	
Source: Elections BC

Key:

- x – less than 0.005% of the popular vote.
- * Party did not nominate candidates in the previous election.

Popular vote
NDP	40.71%
Liberal	33.25%
Social Credit	24.05%
Others	1.99%

Seats summary
NDP	68.00%
Liberal	22.67%
Social Credit	9.33%

=== Synopsis of results ===
1991 British Columbia general election – results by riding
Riding	Winning party							Votes (Note: Minor political parties receiving less than 1% of the popular vote (and fielding candidates in fewer than half the ridings) are aggregated under Other)						
Riding	1st place	Votes	Share	Margin #	Margin %	2nd place	%	NDP	Lib.	SC	Green	Ind	Other	Total
Abbotsford	SC	6,647	36.12%	138	0.75%	Lib	35.37%	5,246	6,509	6,647	–	–	–	18,402
Alberni	NDP	7,136	53.39%	3,471	25.97%	SC	27.42%	7,136	2,358	3,665	–	–	206	13,365
Bulkley Valley-Stikine	NDP	3,744	33.97%	265	2.40%	Lib	31.56%	3,744	3,479	–	–	3,799 (Note: Jack Kempf, who received 2,842 votes, was the incumbent Social Credit MLA for Omineca, but opted to campaign as an Independent in 1991.)	–	11,022
Burnaby-Edmonds	NDP	9,947	47.15%	3,049	14.45%	Lib	32.70%	9,947	6,898	3,900	199	74	77	21,095
Burnaby North	NDP	9,809	48.43%	3,472	17.14%	Lib	31.29%	9,809	6,337	3,833	194	–	81	20,254
Burnaby-Willingdon	NDP	10,597	44.36%	2,574	10.78%	Lib	33.59%	10,597	8,023	5,036	232	–	–	23,888
Cariboo North	NDP	4,919	39.10%	714	5.67%	SC	33.42%	4,919	2,317	4,205	–	–	1,141	12,582
Cariboo South	NDP	6,369	45.37%	1,639	11.68%	SC	33.70%	6,369	2,567	4,730	–	–	371	14,037
Chilliwack	Lib	8,601	38.83%	982	4.43%	SC	34.40%	5,688	8,601	7,619	241	–	–	22,149
Columbia River-Revelstoke	NDP	6,241	45.08%	1,879	13.57%	SC	31.51%	6,241	3,241	4,362	–	–	–	13,844
Comox Valley	NDP	10,355	39.20%	1,601	6.06%	Lib	33.14%	10,355	8,754	6,734	432	49	93	26,417
Coquitlam-Maillardville	NDP	11,136	47.18%	2,206	9.35%	Lib	37.84%	11,136	8,930	3,354	–	117	65	23,602
Cowichan-Ladysmith	NDP	11,038	48.53%	4,229	18.59%	SC	29.94%	11,038	4,896	6,809	–	–	–	22,743
Delta North	NDP	8,068	38.65%	762	3.65%	Lib	35.00%	8,068	7,306	5,252	–	72	178	20,876
Delta South	Lib	8,783	39.82%	2,070	9.39%	SC	30.44%	6,559	8,783	6,713	–	–	–	22,055
Esquimalt-Metchosin	NDP	13,458	59.16%	6,570	28.88%	Lib	30.28%	13,458	6,888	2,402	–	–	–	22,748
Fort Langley-Aldergrove	Lib	8,663	43.57%	2,636	13.26%	NDP	30.31%	6,027	8,663	4,880	–	227	87	19,884
Kamloops	NDP	8,926	43.67%	2,893	14.15%	Lib	29.52%	8,926	6,033	5,481	–	–	–	20,440
Kamloops-North Thompson	NDP	5,843	39.43%	1,149	7.75%	Lib	31.67%	5,843	4,694	4,283	–	–	–	14,820
Kootenay	NDP	7,352	46.48%	2,338	14.78%	SC	31.70%	7,352	3,450	5,014	–	–	–	15,816
Langley	Lib	7,149	38.95%	1,387	7.56%	NDP	31.39%	5,762	7,149	5,201	–	62	180	18,354
Malahat-Juan de Fuca	NDP	8,579	44.18%	940	4.84%	Lib	39.34%	8,579	7,639	2,628	380	–	193	19,419
Maple Ridge-Pitt Meadows	NDP	11,591	45.16%	2,805	10.93%	Lib	34.23%	11,591	8,786	4,986	305	–	–	25,668
Matsqui	SC	8,236	43.74%	1,805	9.59%	Lib	34.15%	4,163	6,431	8,236	–	–	–	18,830
Mission-Kent	NDP	7,659	44.78%	3,080	18.01%	Lib	26.77%	7,659	4,579	4,556	246	63	–	17,103
Nanaimo	NDP	11,135	51.24%	3,579	16.47%	Lib	34.77%	11,135	7,556	2,480	342	–	216	21,729
Nelson-Creston	NDP	8,583	46.90%	2,844	15.54%	SC	31.36%	8,583	3,510	5,739	467	–	–	18,299
New Westminster	NDP	10,384	49.89%	3,267	15.70%	Lib	34.20%	10,384	7,117	3,311	–	–	–	20,812
North Coast	NDP	6,365	59.75%	3,896	36.58%	Lib	23.18%	6,365	2,469	1,818	–	–	–	10,652
North Island	NDP	8,427	50.39%	2,757	16.49%	Lib	33.91%	8,427	5,670	2,217	408	–	–	16,722
North Vancouver-Lonsdale	NDP	7,535	38.63%	476	2.44%	Lib	36.19%	7,535	7,059	4,622	207	–	85	19,508
North Vancouver-Seymour	Lib	12,120	50.84%	4,994	20.95%	NDP	29.89%	7,126	12,120	4,304	205	–	84	23,839
Oak Bay-Gordon Head	NDP	10,522	39.61%	837	3.15%	Lib	36.46%	10,522	9,685	5,556	–	–	803	26,566
Okanagan-Boundary	NDP	7,228	46.82%	3,250	21.05%	SC	25.77%	7,228	3,859	3,978	374	–	–	15,439
Okanagan East	Lib	8,578	38.47%	682	3.06%	SC	35.41%	5,825	8,578	7,896	–	–	–	22,299
Okanagan-Penticton	NDP	7,885	34.84%	448	1.98%	Lib	32.86%	7,885	7,437	6,894	416	–	–	22,632
Okanagan-Vernon	SC	8,615	37.99%	895	3.95%	NDP	34.05%	7,720	6,065	8,615	–	275	–	22,675
Okanagan West	SC	11,667	41.15%	2,657	9.37%	Lib	31.78%	7,361	9,010	11,667	312	–	–	28,350
Parksville-Qualicum	NDP	10,408	40.24%	1,282	4.96%	Lib	35.29%	10,408	9,126	5,846	303	–	180	25,863
Peace River North	SC	5,758	54.79%	3,411	32.45%	NDP	22.33%	2,347	2,048	5,758	303	54	–	10,510
Peace River South	SC	4,617	37.21%	773	6.23%	NDP	30.98%	3,844	3,512	4,617	435	–	–	12,408
Port Coquitlam	NDP	11,435	45.48%	1,506	5.99%	Lib	39.49%	11,435	9,929	3,781	–	–	–	25,145
Port Moody-Burnaby Mountain	NDP	9,821	45.62%	1,730	8.04%	Lib	37.59%	9,821	8,091	3,450	151	–	14	21,527
Powell River-Sunshine Coast	Lib	11,486	54.68%	4,369	20.80%	NDP	33.88%	7,117	11,486	2,174	161	66	–	21,004
Prince George-Mount Robson	NDP	5,751	50.99%	1,616	14.33%	SC	36.66%	5,751	–	4,135	–	1,393	–	11,279
Prince George North	NDP	5,468	38.74%	962	6.82%	Lib	31.93%	5,468	4,506	4,139	–	–	–	14,113
Prince George-Omineca	SC	6,656	52.05%	525	4.11%	NDP	47.95%	6,131	–	6,656	–	–	–	12,787
Richmond Centre	Lib	7,806	42.44%	1,284	6.98%	NDP	35.46%	6,522	7,806	3,889	108	–	68	18,393
Richmond East	Lib	6,870	40.91%	774	4.61%	NDP	36.30%	6,096	6,870	3,703	123	–	–	16,792
Richmond-Steveston	Lib	6,664	38.32%	610	3.51%	NDP	34.81%	6,054	6,664	4,609	–	–	65	17,392
Rossland-Trail	NDP	8,340	51.73%	4,538	28.15%	Ind	23.58%	8,340	–	3,267	713	3,802 (Note: Christopher D'Arcy was the incumbent NDP MLA for Rossland-Trail.)	–	16,122
Saanich North and the Islands	Lib	13,633	52.53%	4,888	18.84%	NDP	33.70%	8,745	13,633	2,917	–	–	656	25,951
Saanich South	NDP	10,254	44.63%	1,945	8.47%	Lib	36.17%	10,254	8,309	4,218	–	–	193	22,974
Shuswap	NDP	7,687	35.50%	405	1.87%	Lib	33.63%	7,687	7,282	6,262	422	–	–	21,653
Skeena	NDP	5,597	46.67%	831	6.93%	SC	39.74%	5,597	1,629	4,766	–	–	–	11,992
Surrey-Cloverdale	Lib	9,012	38.28%	1,751	7.44%	NDP	30.84%	7,261	9,012	6,920	–	–	348	23,541
Surrey-Green Timbers	NDP	8,708	46.16%	2,384	12.64%	Lib	33.52%	8,708	6,324	3,744	89	–	–	18,865
Surrey-Newton	NDP	10,193	42.28%	2,397	9.94%	SC	32.34%	10,193	5,923	7,796	197	–	–	24,109
Surrey-Whalley	NDP	7,243	47.76%	2,381	15.70%	Lib	32.06%	7,243	4,862	2,922	137	–	–	15,164
Surrey-White Rock	Lib	11,008	38.84%	1,945	6.86%	NDP	31.98%	9,063	11,008	8,062	–	–	209	28,342
Vancouver-Burrard	NDP	9,725	50.93%	2,998	15.70%	Lib	35.23%	9,725	6,727	2,201	441	–	–	19,094
Vancouver-Fraserview	NDP	8,016	44.16%	2,179	12.00%	Lib	32.16%	8,016	5,837	4,060	141	–	98	18,152
Vancouver-Hastings	NDP	10,087	55.93%	4,995	27.69%	Lib	28.23%	10,087	5,092	2,589	268	–	–	18,036
Vancouver-Kensington	NDP	8,323	46.85%	3,623	20.39%	Lib	26.45%	8,323	4,700	4,389	155	–	200	17,767
Vancouver-Kingsway	NDP	9,292	54.79%	4,902	28.90%	Lib	25.88%	9,292	4,390	3,112	137	–	29	16,960
Vancouver-Langara	Lib	7,241	36.95%	467	2.38%	NDP	34.56%	6,774	7,241	5,374	134	–	75	19,598
Vancouver-Little Mountain	NDP	10,383	45.43%	2,203	9.64%	Lib	35.79%	10,383	8,180	3,944	259	90	–	22,856
Vancouver-Mount Pleasant	NDP	10,108	63.33%	6,971	43.67%	Lib	19.65%	10,108	3,137	2,143	432	–	142	15,962
Vancouver-Point Grey	NDP	12,076	49.26%	3,054	12.46%	Lib	36.80%	12,076	9,022	2,817	388	138	75	24,516
Vancouver-Quilchena	Lib	11,373	49.53%	5,201	22.65%	NDP	26.88%	6,172	11,373	5,113	302	–	–	22,960
Victoria-Beacon Hill	NDP	10,939	47.95%	3,505	15.36%	Lib	32.59%	10,939	7,434	3,712	728	–	–	22,813
Victoria-Hillside	NDP	11,117	51.39%	3,884	17.95%	Lib	33.44%	11,117	7,233	2,714	569	–	–	21,633
West Vancouver-Capilano	Lib	13,194	56.63%	7,033	30.18%	SC	26.44%	3,740	13,194	6,161	140	–	65	23,300
West Vancouver-Garibaldi	Lib	11,182	58.36%	6,676	34.84%	NDP	23.52%	4,506	11,182	3,020	454	–	–	19,162
Yale-Lillooet	NDP	7,740	52.31%	683	4.62%	SC	47.69%	7,740	–	7,057	–	–	–	14,797

= Winning candidate held seat in previous Legislature
= Incumbent had switched allegiance
= Previously incumbent in another riding
= Not incumbent; was previously elected to the Legislature
= Incumbency arose from byelection gain
= Other incumbents renominated
= Previously an MP in the House of Commons of Canada
= Multiple candidates

== Legacy ==
This was considered a political realignment due to the high turnover in MLAs and the effective end of the Socreds as a political force. The party was completely shut out of the legislature in the 1996 election, never to return. Meanwhile, the Liberals replaced them as the main non-socialist party in British Columbia. The NDP and Liberals would go on to be the two main parties in the province until 2024, when the Liberals, who by then had renamed themselves BC United, withdrew from that year's general election and endorsed the Conservative Party of British Columbia.

However, neither Harcourt, Wilson, or Johnston would contest the subsequent 1996 election as leaders of the major parties, with Johnston and Harcourt having retired from politics by that campaign. Johnston, having lost her seat, resigned the leadership of the Socreds immediately in early 1992. Harcourt resigned as premier in 1996 due to a scandal among the MLAs in his caucus. Wilson proved unable to consolidate the party's leadership due to inexperience and he was eventually deposed in 1993, and he crossed to the NDP in 1997 after a brief spell as founder, leader and sole MLA of the Progressive Democratic Alliance. He served as an MLA and minister until his defeat in 2001. Wilson was also a candidate for the NDP's leadership in 2000, won by Ujjal Dosanjh.

== See also ==
- List of British Columbia political parties
