= Winter: Five Windows on the Season =

Book by Adam Gopnik

Winter Five Windows on the Season
- Author: Adam Gopnik
- Language: English
- Genre: Nonfiction
- Publisher: House of Anansi Press
- Publication date: October 2011
- Publication place: Canada
- Media type: Print (Paperback), Audio
- Pages: 256 pp.
- ISBN: 978-0-88784-974-9
- OCLC: 732948892
- Preceded by: Player One: What Is to Become of Us

Winter: Five Windows on the Season is a nonfiction book written by Adam Gopnik for the 2011 Massey Lectures. Each of the book's five chapters had been delivered as a one-hour lecture discussing artistic portrayals of winter: its impact on culture and societies, polar exploration, and winter recreation. Each lecture was held in a different Canadian city: Montreal on October 12, Halifax on October 14, Edmonton on October 21, Vancouver on October 23, and ending in Toronto on October 26. The book was published by House of Anansi Press while the lectures were broadcast on CBC Radio One's Ideas between November 7 and 11.

While Gopnik was raised in Montreal, by 2011 he worked as a staff writer for The New Yorker magazine in New York City. Gopnik selected 'winter' as his general topic and spent nearly a year preparing for the lectures.

== Background ==
Adam Gopnik was selected to deliver the 2011 Massey Lectures, the annual week-long series of lectures on a political, cultural or philosophical topic given in Canada by a noted scholar. Gopnik was chosen by the panel of representatives from Massey College, House of Anansi Press and the CBC, the organizations responsible for coordinating the lectures. This would be the 50th anniversary of the Massey Lectures and coincide with the 75th anniversary of the CBC. Ideas executive producer Bernie Lucht contacted Gopnik by email to inform him of the panel's decision and to ask if he would accept. At the time Gopnik was living in New York City, working as a staff writer for The New Yorker magazine. He had previously authored several books on different topics, the most successful being Paris to the Moon, a collection of essays published in 2000. Gopnik read Lucht's email while waiting for a bus on Madison Avenue. Gopnik later stated that by the end of the 20-minute bus ride he had already selected a topic and had a good idea of the issues he would address.

Understanding the Massey Lectures were part of the Canadian culture, Gopnik, who was born in Philadelphia but lived in Montreal between the ages of 10 and 25, wanted a topic that would be relevant to Canadians but also have universal appeal: winter. Winter had appeared as a theme or setting in many of his previous writings, and he especially looked forward to talking about ice hockey. Gopnik spent the next year researching and writing the book, alongside another nonfiction book he was working on at the time: The Table Comes First: Family, France, and the Meaning of Food. This other book was released shortly after Winter, and purposefully contained one identical sentence.

== Content ==
Winter's persona changes with our perception of safety from it – the glass of the window, as I sensed in that November snowstorm, is the lens through which modern winter is always seen. The romance of winter is possible only when we have a warm, secure indoors to retreat to, and winter becomes a season to look at as much as one to live through.

— Adam Gopnik, Winter, p. 4

There are five chapters, each of which consider a different aspect of winter. The first chapter, "Romantic Winter", describes how winter has been portrayed since the 1700s from the point of view of artists and writers. According to Gopnik, the view of winter has changed over time, from something that had to be overcome to something romanticized as hearths, glass windows, and coal heating made the cold more tolerable. Other factors, such as nationalism, religion, technology, also changed the social view of winter from being portrayed as "bleak and bitter to sweet and sublime". The second chapter, "Radical Winter", recounts the history of polar expeditions, including John Ross, John Franklin, Robert Peary, Robert Falcon Scott, Roald Amundsen, and Ernest Shackleton.

"Recuperative Winter" reviews the cultural and social history of winter festivals and holidays. Gopnik posits that the modern Christmas is a compound holiday merging elements from numerous societies, traditions, and beliefs; that its moral foundations were established in the 1820/30s; its celebratory and commercialism elements were established in the 1870s. He also argues that stress and anxiety have been part of the holiday since the 1920s. "Recreational Winter" is about winter sports, like ice hockey. The evolution of ice skating is identified from the Dutch bringing the concept to England in the 1600s and the origin of hockey is traced back to a particular neighbourhood in Montreal in the 1800s. He portrays winter sports as being more about preparation and the pleasure of solitude, in contrast with summer sports, which are more about impulse. The final chapter, "Remembering Winter", discusses three ways that the human experience of winter is changing: through technological and architectural innovations, via global warming, and by memory.

== Style and themes ==
The chapters are written so that they could be read as lectures. Though several reviewers referred to them as essays, Gopnik made the distinction between an essay, which is written to be read silently, and a lecture, which is meant to be spoken and keeps some of the rhythm of speech. Gopnik purposefully tried "to keep them as conversational as possible [and so] they lack the polish of his New Yorker essays". The lectures' conversational tone, with both common and arcane references, was meant to appeal to a "middlebrow" audience; they were designed to be "profound and significant" but not academic. The reviewer in The Observer described the writing as "designed to maintain a constant flame of curiosity in a lecture room shut against the cold".

The book was called an "elegy for a season". Encyclopedist James Harley Marsh believes that the central theme was, as Gopnik himself writes, that "winter started as this thing we had to get through; it has ended as this time to hold on to". The Edmonton Journal reviewer describes Gopnik's guiding metaphor for his approach to winter as "ice wine: sweetness made from stress", that the perceived benefits of winter come directly from the hardships it brings. Ian McGillis in the Montreal Review of Books identifies "two simple ideas that govern and unite the five lectures": first, that the view from inside can provide a better developed idea of what is outside, and second, that winter continues to defy the human need to consistently name and organize the world.

== Publication and reception ==
The book was published by House of Anansi Press and released on September 26, 2011. The five chapters/lectures were delivered by Gopnik in five locations across Canada: the first chapter was delivered in Montreal on October 12, the second in Halifax (Dalhousie Arts Centre) on October 14, the third in Edmonton (University of Alberta) on October 21, the fourth in Vancouver (Chan Centre for the Performing Arts) on October 23, and the final chapter in The Royal Conservatory of Music at the University of Toronto on October 26. Gopnik was in Guelph on October 25 where he recited passages and promoted the book. An excerpt was published in the October 3 edition of Maclean's magazine.

Reviewers variously described the book as "interesting", "charming" and "fascinating" and the prose as "eloquent", "thoughtful", but sometimes slow. The Publishers Weekly review stated that "Gopnik leavens dense material with humor, and makes unwieldy concepts accessible through modern-day comparisons". Bill Rambo in the Winnipeg Free Press said that it "reads smoothly and effectively [and demonstrates] encyclopedic knowledge and incisive research into a subject", concluding that the chapter Recreational Winter about sports was the most passionate. Charles Wilkins in The Globe and Mail found Remembering Winter, the chapter about cultural and social memories of winter to be the "most personal and poignant" and entertaining. Helen Gallagher in the New York Journal of Books "highly recommended" the book.

The book was published in the United Kingdom, in November 2012, by Quercus, a London-based independent publishing house. The review in The Daily Telegraph concluded that "while there are flashes of brilliance here, there's also a nagging sense that he's snatching at snowflakes. Time and time again one comes across statements that look, and sound good - these pieces were originally delivered as lectures - but which just don't stand up to analysis." The reviewer cited examples, like the illustrations of the theatrics people display when coming in from the cold and the isolated feelings of downhill skiers which the reviewer rebutted with similar examples of the same that occur in temperate climates. Nick Rennison reviewed the book for The Sunday Times, writing that "any writer who can take subjects as diverse as [these]....and find something original and interesting to say about each of them, has to be worth reading."
