= Adam Gopnik bibliography =

A list of the published work of Adam Gopnik, American writer and editor.

== Books ==
- Gopnik, Adam (1980). Voila Carême. Drawings by Jack Huberman. New York: St. Martin's Press.
- Varnedoe, Kirk & Adam Gopnik, eds. (1990). Modern art and popular culture : readings in high & low. New York: Abrams in association with the Museum of Modern Art.
- Gopnik, Adam (2000). Paris to the Moon. New York: Random House.
- —, ed. (2004). Americans in Paris : a literary anthology. New York: Library of America.
- — (2005). The king in the window. New York: Hyperion Books For Children.
- — (2006). Through the children's gate : a home in New York. New York: Alfred A. Knopf.
- — (2009). Angels and ages : a short book about Darwin, Lincoln, and modern life. New York: Alfred A. Knopf.
- — (2010). The steps across the water. Illustrated by Bruce McCall. New York: Disney/Hyperion Books.
- — (2011). Winter : five windows on the season. Berkeley, CA: House of Anansi Press.
- — (2011). The table comes first : family, France, and the meaning of food. New York: Alfred A. Knopf. ISBN 9780307593450.
- — (2017). At the strangers' gate : arrivals in New York. New York: Alfred A. Knopf.
- — (2019). A thousand small sanities : the moral adventure of liberalism. Basic Books. ISBN 978-1541699366.
- — (2019). All alike. Thornwillow Press.
- — (2023). The real work : on the mystery of mastery. New York: Liveright.
- — (2024). All that happiness is : some words on what matters. New York: Liveright.

== Essays, reporting and other contributions ==
=== 2005–2009 ===
- Heiferman, Marvin, ed. (2005). City art : New York's Percent for Art Program. Essay by Eleanor Heartney; introduction by Adam Gopnik; preface by Michael R. Bloomberg; featured photography by David S. Allee. New York: Merrell. ISBN 185894290X.
- Varnedoe, Kirk (2006). Pictures of nothing : abstract art since Pollock. Preface by Adam Gopnik. Princeton, NJ: Princeton University Press.
- Gopnik, Adam (February 12, 2007). "Whitney Balliett". The Talk of the Town. Postscript. The New Yorker. 82 (49): 31.
- — (December 8, 2008). "Man of fetters : Dr. Johnson and Mrs. Thrale". The Critics. A Critic at Large. The New Yorker. 84 (40): 90–96.
- — (September 28, 2009). "Read all about it". The Talk of the Town. Comment. The New Yorker. 85 (30): 21–22.

=== 2010–2014 ===
- Gopnik, Adam (March 15, 2010). "Plant TV". The Talk of the Town. Bright Ideas. The New Yorker. 86 (4): 23–24.
- — (April 5, 2010). "No Rules! Is Le Fooding, the French Culinary Movement, More Than a Feeling?". The New Yorker. 86 (7): 36–41.
- — (May 24, 2010). "What Did Jesus Do? Reading and Unreading the Gospels". A Critic at Large. The New Yorker. 86 (14): 72–77.
- Zweig, Stefan (2011). Departures : Memoirs. Foreword by Adam Gopnik; introduction by Morris Dickstein. New York: Other Press.
- Gopnik, Adam (February 14, 2011). "The information : how the internet gets inside us". The New Yorker. 87 (1): 124–130.
- — (April 4, 2011). "Get smart". The Critics. Books. The New Yorker. 87 (7): 70–74.
- Stevens, Norma & Yolanda Cuomo, eds. (2012). New York at night : photography after dark. Texts by Norma Stevens, Pete Hamill, Adam Gopnik, Vince Aletti, Patricia Marx. New York: Powerhouse Books. ISBN 9781576876169.
- Gopnik, Adam (January 16, 2012). "Enquiring minds : the Spanish Inquisition revisited". The Critics. A Critic at Large. The New Yorker. 87 (44): 70–75.
- — (January 30, 2012). "The caging of America". The New Yorker. 87 (46): 72–77.
- — (November 26, 2012). "Military secrets". The Talk of the Town. Comment. The New Yorker. 88 (37): 19–20.
- — (January 28, 2013). "Music to your ears : the quest for 3-D recording and other mysteries of sound". Onward and Upward with the Arts. The New Yorker. 88 (45): 32–39.
- — (February 11–18, 2013). "Moon man". The Critics. A Critic at Large. The New Yorker. 89 (1): 103–109.
- — (March 18, 2013). "Happy birthday". The Talk of the Town. Comment. The New Yorker. 89 (5): 21–22.
- — (April 1, 2013). "Sauced". Talk of the Town. Master Class. The New Yorker. 89 (7): 23–24.
- — (April 8, 2013). "Andre, again". Goings on About Town. The Pictures. The New Yorker. 89 (8): 27.
- — (April 22, 2013). "Yellow fever : a hundred and twenty-five years of National Geographic". The Critics. A Critic at Large. The New Yorker. 89 (10): 102–108.
- — (June 10–17, 2013). "In the back cabana: the rise and rise of Florida crime fiction". The Critics. A Critic at Large. The New Yorker. 89 (17): 104–107.
- — (November 4, 2013). "Bread and women : two muses, one loaf". Personal History. The New Yorker. 89 (35): 66–70.
- — (November 4, 2013). "Closer than that : the assassination of J.F.K., fifty years later". The Critics. A Critic at Large. The New Yorker. 89 (35): 100–107.
- — (December 23–30, 2013). "Two bands". The Critics. A Critic at Large. The New Yorker. 89 (42): 121–127.
- — (January 6, 2014). "Two ships". The Talk of the Town. Comment. The New Yorker. 89 (43): 17–18.
- — (April 21, 2014). "Go giants : a new survey of the Great American Novel". The Critics. Books. The New Yorker. 90 (9): 102–104.
- — (May 12, 2014). "Team spirit". The Talk of the Town. Comment. The New Yorker. 90 (12): 23–24.
- — (September 1, 2014). "Heaven's gaits : what we do when we walk". The Critics. A Critic at Large. The New Yorker. 90 (25): 74–77.
- — (December 22–29, 2014). "The fires of Paris : why do people still fight about the Paris Commune?". The Critics. Books. The New Yorker. 90 (41): 145–149.

=== 2015–2019 ===
- Hughes, Robert (2015). The spectacle of skill : new and selected writings of Robert Hughes. Introduction by Adam Gopnik.
- Gopnik, Adam (January 12, 2015). "The outside game : how the sociologist Howard Becker studies the conventions of the unconventional". Paris Journal. The New Yorker. 90 (43): 26–31.
- — (February 2, 2015). "The driver's seat : what we learn when we learn to drive". Personal History. The New Yorker. 90 (46): 48–55.
- — (March 16, 2015). "In the memory ward : the Warburg is Britain's most eccentric and original library. Can it survive?". Dept. of Culture. The New Yorker. 91 (4): 34–41.
- — (May 4, 2015). "Trollope trending : why he's still the novelist of the way we live now". The Critics. A Critic at Large. The New Yorker. 91 (11): 28–32.
- — (July 27, 2015). "Sweet home Alabama : Harper Lee's Go set a watchman". The Critics. Books. The New Yorker. 91 (21): 66–71.
- — (August 3, 2015). "The comparable Max : Max Beerbohm's cult of the diminutive". The Critics. Books. The New Yorker. 91 (22): 74–79.
- Charb (2016). Open letter : on blasphemy, Islamophobia, and the true enemies of free expression. Foreword by Adam Gopnik. New York: Little, Brown. ISBN 9780316311335.
- Stettner, Louis (2016). Penn Station, New York. Introduction by Adam Gopnik. Thames & Hudson.
- Gopnik, Adam (February 1, 2016). "Vaucluse". Goings on About Town. Tables for Two. The New Yorker. 91 (46): 13.
- — (April 25, 2016). "Long play : the charmed lives of Paul McCartney". A Critic at Large. The New Yorker. 92 (11): 46–49.
- — (May 23, 2016). "Liberal-in-Chief". The Talk of the Town. Comment. The New Yorker. 92 (15): 23–24.
- — (July 11, 2016). "Cool runnings : how to become President of Iceland". Letter from Reykjavik. The New Yorker. 92 (21): 44–49.
- — (January 16, 2017). "Mixed Up". A Critic at Large. The New Yorker. 92 (45): 81–85.
- — (January 30, 2017). "No cigar". The Talk of the Town. Encore Dept. The New Yorker. 92 (47): 20–21.
- — (March 20, 2017). "The illiberal imagination : are liberals on the wrong side of history?". The Critics. Books. The New Yorker. 93 (5): 88–93.
- — (July 3, 2017). "A new man : Ernest Hemingway, revised and revisited". The Critics. Books. The New Yorker. 93 (19): 61–66.
- — (December 4, 2017). "Wired : what Alexander Calder set in motion". The Critics. Books. The New Yorker. 93 (39): 73–77.
- — (February 12–19, 2018). "After the fall : drawing the right lessons from the decline in violent crime". The Critics. Books. The New Yorker. 94 (1): 92–97.
- — (March 4, 2019). "Diderot dicta : how a pornographer, polemicist, and prisoner became the Age of Reason's greatest impresario". The Critics. Books. The New Yorker. 95 (2): 54–60.
- — (May 20, 2019). "Younger longer : can the infirmities of aging be postponed?". Brave New World Dept. The New Yorker. 95 (13): 36–43.
- — (December 30, 2019). "Sad buildings in Brooklyn : scenes from the life of Roz Chast". Profiles. The New Yorker. 95 (42): 32–39.

=== 2020–2024 ===
- Gopnik, Adam (January 6, 2020). "Good old days". The Talk of the Town. Comment. The New Yorker. 95 (43): 13–14.
- — (June 1, 2020). "The empty couch". Coronavirus Chronicles. The New Yorker. 96 (15): 16–20.
- — (December 28, 2020). "Hot-ice-cream dreams : the marvellously mixed–up masters of early animated cartoons". The Critics. Books. The New Yorker. 96 (42): 78–82.
- — (January 4–11, 2021). "Fault lines". The Talk of the Town. Comment. The New Yorker. 96 (43): 15–16.
- — (September 6, 2021). "Cooked books : real food from fictional recipes". The Critics. Readings. April 9, 2007. The New Yorker. 97 (27): 74–76.
- — (May 23, 2022). "Power up : are today's dictators different?". The Critics. Books. The New Yorker. 98 (13): 56–61.
- — (May 30, 2022). "The end of the line : it's long past time to reassess rhyme". The Critics. Books. The New Yorker. 98 (14): 65–69.
- — (January 13, 2023). "Writer Adam Gopnik on His Surprise Cameo Opposite Cate Blanchett in Tár". Esquire. London.
- — (January 1–8, 2024). "Winter sun : how Camille Pissarro went from mediocrity to magnificence". The Critics. Books. The New Yorker. 99 (44): 53–57.
