= Postmodern art =

Art movement

Postmodern art

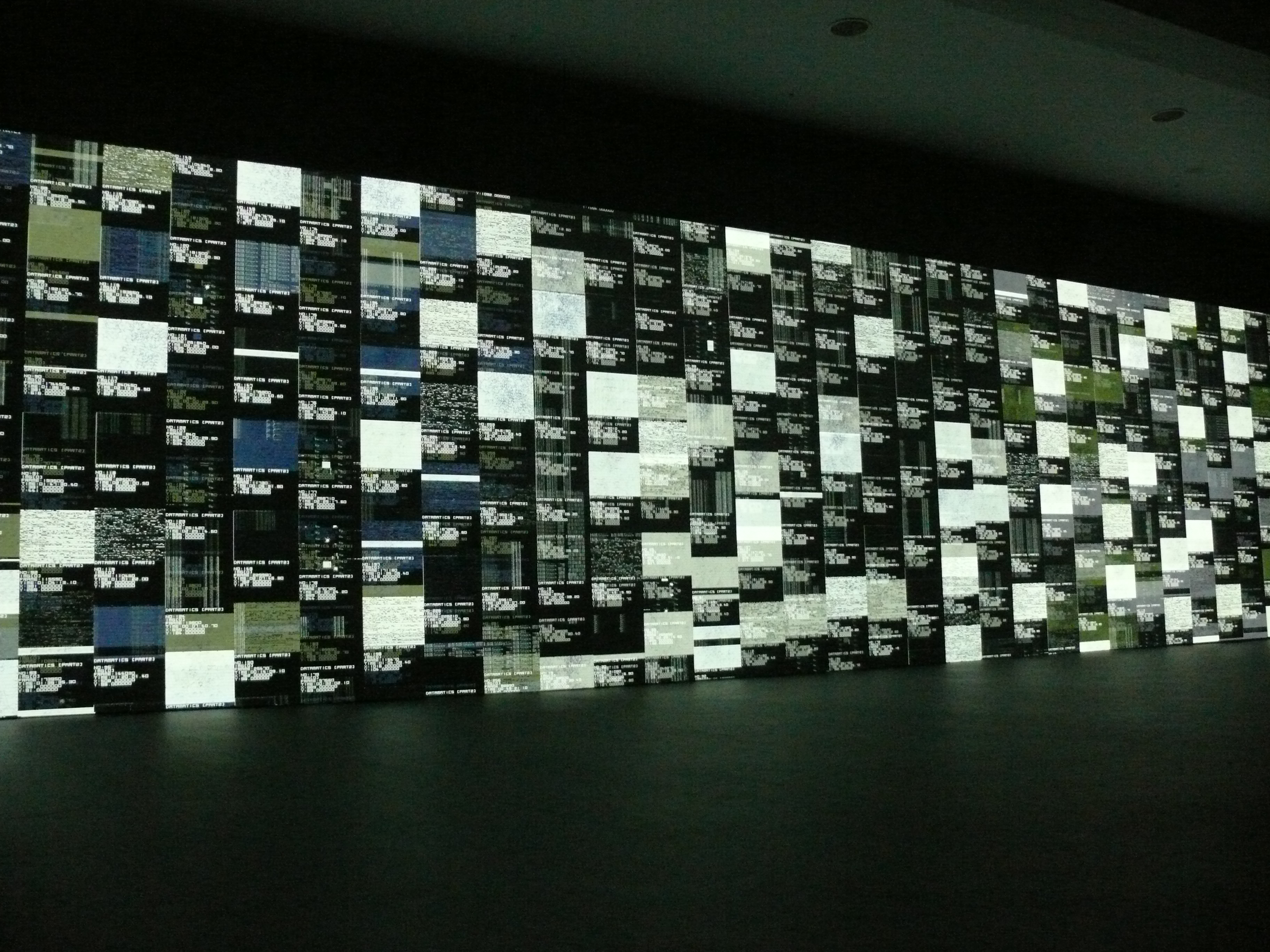
Data.Tron [8K Enhanced Version] by Ryoji Ikeda on show in transmediale 10

Postmodern art is a body of art movements that sought to contradict some aspects of modernism or some aspects that emerged or developed in its aftermath. In general, movements such as intermedia, installation art, conceptual art and multimedia, particularly involving video are described as postmodern.

There are several characteristics which lend art to being postmodern; these include the recycling of past styles and themes in a modern-day context, bricolage, the use of text prominently as the central artistic element, collage, simplification, appropriation, performance art, as well as the break-up of the barrier between fine and high arts and low art and popular culture.

== Use of the term ==
The predominant term for art produced since the 1950s is "contemporary art". Not all art labeled as contemporary art is postmodern, and the broader term encompasses both artists who continue to work in modernist and late modernist traditions, as well as artists who reject postmodernism for other reasons. Arthur Danto argues "contemporary" is the broader term, and postmodern objects represent a "subsector" of the contemporary movement. Some postmodern artists have made more distinctive breaks from the ideas of modern art and there is no consensus as to what is "late-modern" and what is "post-modern". Ideas rejected by the modern aesthetic have been re-established. In painting, postmodernism reintroduced representation. Some critics argue much of the current "postmodern" art, the latest avant-gardism, should still classify as modern art.

As well as describing certain tendencies of contemporary art, postmodern has also been used to denote a phase of modern art. Defenders of modernism, such as Clement Greenberg, as well as radical opponents of modernism, such as Félix Guattari, who calls it modernism's "last gasp", have adopted this position. The neo-conservative Hilton Kramer describes postmodernism as "a creation of modernism at the end of its tether". Jean-François Lyotard, in Fredric Jameson's analysis, does not hold there is a postmodern stage radically different from the period of high modernism; instead, postmodern discontent with this or that high modernist style is part of the experimentation of high modernism, giving birth to new modernisms. In the context of aesthetics and art, Jean-François Lyotard is a major philosopher of postmodernism.

Many critics hold postmodern art emerges from modern art. Suggested dates for the shift from modern to postmodern include 1914 in Europe, and 1962 or 1968 in America. James Elkins, commenting on discussions about the exact date of the transition from modernism to postmodernism, compares it to the discussion in the 1960s about the exact span of mannerism and whether it should begin directly after the High Renaissance or later in the century. He makes the point these debates go on all the time with respect to art movements and periods, which is not to say they are not important. The close of the period of postmodern art has been dated to the end of the 1980s, when the word postmodernism lost much of its critical resonance, and art practices began to address the impact of globalization and new media.

Jean Baudrillard has had a significant influence on postmodern-inspired art and emphasised the possibilities of new forms of creativity. The artist Peter Halley describes his day-glo colours as "hyperrealization of real color", and acknowledges Baudrillard as an influence. Baudrillard himself, since 1984, was fairly consistent in his view that contemporary art, and postmodern art in particular, was inferior to the modernist art of the post World War II period, while Jean-François Lyotard praised Contemporary painting and remarked on its evolution from Modern art. Major women artists in the Twentieth Century are associated with postmodern art since much theoretical articulation of their work emerged from French psychoanalysis and feminist theory that is strongly related to post modern philosophy.

As with all uses of the term postmodern, there are critics of its application. Kirk Varnedoe, for instance, stated that there is no such thing as postmodernism, and that the possibilities of modernism have not yet been exhausted. Though the usage of the term as a kind of shorthand to designate the work of certain Post-war "schools" employing relatively specific material and generic techniques has become conventional since the early to mid-1980s, the theoretical underpinnings of Postmodernism as an epochal or epistemic division are still very much in controversy.

== Characteristics ==
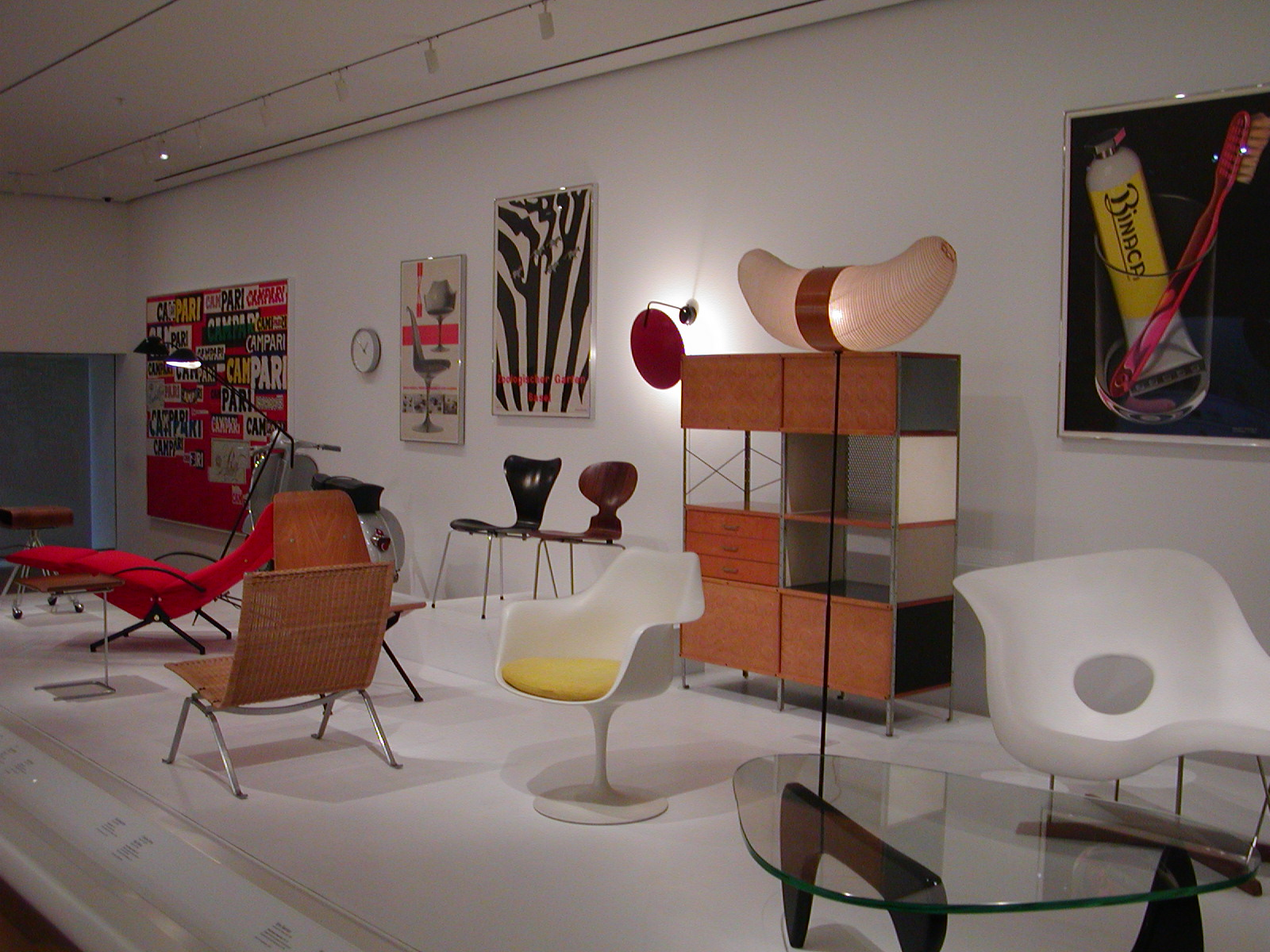
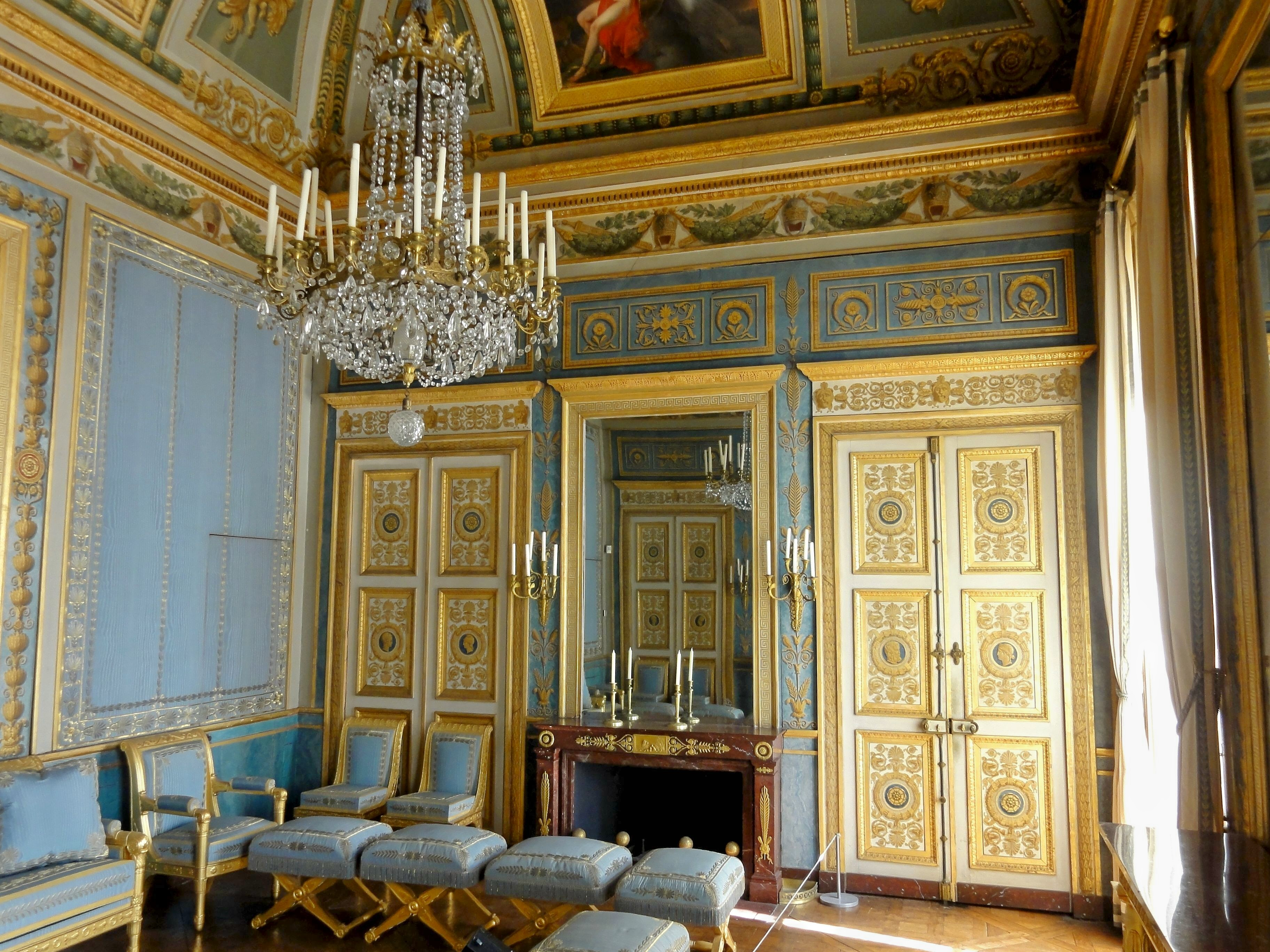
The juxtaposition of old and new, especially with regards to taking styles from past periods and re-fitting them into modern art outside of their original context, is a common characteristic of postmodern art.

Postmodernism describes movements which both arise from, and react against or reject, trends in modernism. General citations for specific trends of modernism are formal purity, medium specificity, art for art's sake, authenticity, universality, originality and revolutionary or reactionary tendency, i.e. the avant-garde. However, paradox is probably the most important modernist idea against which postmodernism reacts. Paradox was central to the modernist enterprise, which Manet introduced. Manet's various violations of representational art brought to prominence the supposed mutual exclusiveness of reality and representation, design and representation, abstraction and reality, and so on. The incorporation of paradox was highly stimulating from Manet to the conceptualists.

The status of the avant-garde is controversial: many institutions argue being visionary, forward-looking, cutting-edge, and progressive are crucial to the mission of art in the present, and therefore postmodern art contradicts the value of "art of our times". Postmodernism rejects the notion of advancement or progress in art per se, and thus aims to overturn the "myth of the avant-garde". Rosalind Krauss was one of the important enunciators of the view that avant-gardism was over, and the new artistic era is post-liberal and post-progress. Griselda Pollock studied and confronted the avant-garde and modern art in a series of groundbreaking books, reviewing modern art at the same time as redefining postmodern art.

One characteristic of postmodern art is its conflation of high and low culture through the use of industrial materials and pop culture imagery. The use of low forms of art were a part of modernist experimentation as well, as documented in Kirk Varnedoe and Adam Gopnik's 1990–91 show High and Low: Popular Culture and Modern Art at New York's Museum of Modern Art, an exhibition that was universally panned at the time as the only event that could bring Douglas Crimp and Hilton Kramer together in a chorus of scorn. Postmodern art is noted for the way in which it blurs the distinctions between what is perceived as fine or high art and what is generally seen as low or kitsch art. While this concept of "blurring" or "fusing" high art with low art had been experimented during modernism, it only ever became fully endorsed after the advent of the postmodern era. Postmodernism introduced elements of commercialism, kitsch and a general camp aesthetic within its artistic context; postmodernism takes styles from past periods, such as Gothicism, the Renaissance and the Baroque, and mixes them so as to ignore their original use in their corresponding artistic movement. Such elements are common characteristics of what defines postmodern art. Art Spiegelman, when discussing his selection of a specific style for Maus, described a postmodernist's ability to develop a wide "palette" of varying styles that they can draw from at will, where their predecessors would instead focus on improving and maintaining a single "trademark" style.

Fredric Jameson suggests postmodern works abjure any claim to spontaneity and directness of expression, making use instead of pastiche and discontinuity. Against this definition, Art and Language's Charles Harrison and Paul Wood maintained pastiche and discontinuity are endemic to modernist art, and are deployed effectively by modern artists such as Manet and Picasso.

One compact definition is postmodernism rejects modernism's grand narratives of artistic direction, eradicating the boundaries between high and low forms of art, and disrupting genre's conventions with collision, collage, and fragmentation. Postmodern art holds all stances are unstable and insincere, and therefore irony, parody, and humor are the only positions critique or revision cannot overturn. "Pluralism and diversity" are other defining features.

== Avant-garde precursors ==
Radical movements and trends regarded as influential and potentially as precursors to postmodernism emerged around World War I and particularly in its aftermath. With the introduction of the use of industrial artifacts in art and techniques such as collage, avant-garde movements such as Cubism, Dada and Surrealism questioned the nature and value of art. New artforms, such as cinema and the rise of reproduction, influenced these movements as a means of creating artworks. The ignition point for the definition of modernism, Clement Greenberg's essay, Avant-Garde and Kitsch, first published in Partisan Review in 1939, defends the avant-garde in the face of popular culture. Later, Peter Bürger would make a distinction between the historical avant-garde and modernism, and critics such as Krauss, Huyssen, and Douglas Crimp, following Bürger, identified the historical avant-garde as a precursor to postmodernism. Krauss, for example, describes Pablo Picasso's use of collage as an avant-garde practice anticipating postmodern art with its emphasis on language at the expense of autobiography. Another point of view is avant-garde and modernist artists used similar strategies and postmodernism repudiates both.

=== Dada ===
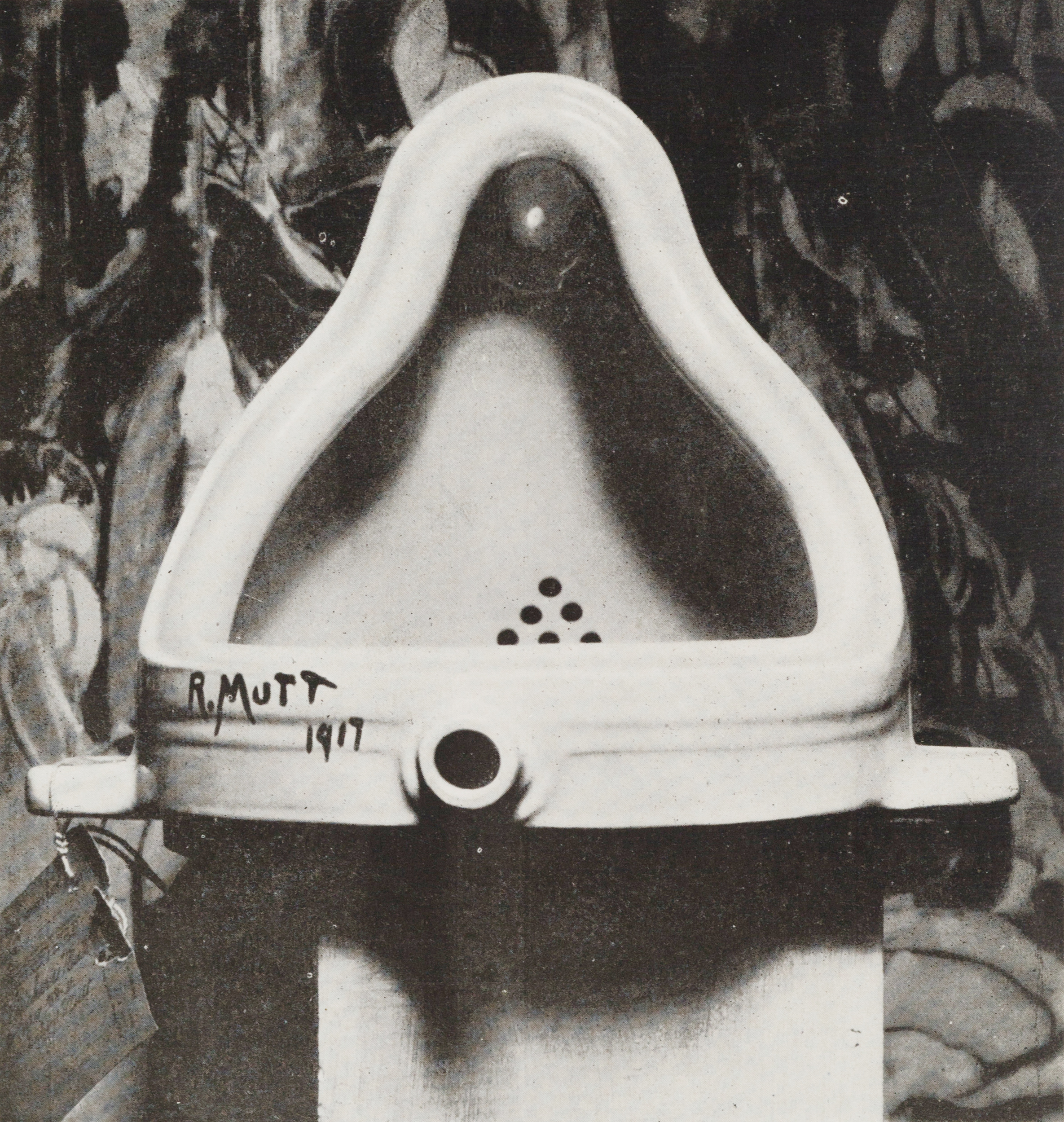
Marcel Duchamp, Fountain, 1917. Photograph by Alfred Stieglitz

In the early 20th century, Marcel Duchamp exhibited a urinal as a sculpture. His point was to have people look at the urinal as if it were a work of art just because he said it was a work of art. He referred to his work as "Readymades". The Fountain was a urinal signed with the pseudonym R. Mutt, which shocked the art world in 1917. This and Duchamp's other works are generally labelled as Dada. Duchamp can be seen as a precursor to conceptual art. Some critics question calling Duchamp—whose obsession with paradox is well known—postmodernist on the grounds he eschews any specific medium, since paradox is not medium-specific, although it arose first in Manet's paintings.

Dadaism can be viewed as part of the modernist propensity to challenge established styles and forms, along with Surrealism, Futurism and Abstract Expressionism. From a chronological point of view, Dada is located solidly within modernism, however a number of critics hold it anticipates postmodernism, while others, such as Ihab Hassan and Steven Connor, consider it a possible changeover point between modernism and postmodernism. For example, according to McEvilly, postmodernism begins with realizing one no longer believes in the myth of progress, and Duchamp sensed this in 1914 when he changed from a modernist practice to a postmodernist one, "abjuring aesthetic delectation, transcendent ambition, and tour de force demonstrations of formal agility in favor of aesthetic indifference, acknowledgement of the ordinary world, and the found object or readymade".

== Radical movements in modern art ==
In general, Pop Art and Minimalism began as modernist movements: a paradigm shift and philosophical split between formalism and anti-formalism in the early 1970s caused those movements to be viewed by some as precursors or transitional postmodern art. Other modern movements cited as influential to postmodern art are conceptual art and the use of techniques such as assemblage, montage, bricolage, and appropriation.

=== Jackson Pollock and abstract expressionism ===
During the late 1940s and early 1950s, Pollock's radical approach to painting revolutionized the potential for all Contemporary art following him. Pollock realized the journey toward making a work of art was as important as the work of art itself. Like Pablo Picasso's innovative reinventions of painting and sculpture near the turn of the century via Cubism and constructed sculpture, Pollock redefined artmaking during the mid-century. Pollock's move from easel painting and conventionality liberated his contemporaneous artists and following artists. They realized Pollock's process — working on the floor, unstretched raw canvas, from all four sides, using artist materials, industrial materials, imagery, non-imagery, throwing linear skeins of paint, dripping, drawing, staining, brushing - blasted artmaking beyond prior boundaries. Abstract expressionism expanded and developed the definitions and possibilities artists had available for the creation of new works of art. In a sense, the innovations of Jackson Pollock, Willem de Kooning, Franz Kline, Mark Rothko, Philip Guston, Hans Hofmann, Clyfford Still, Barnett Newman, Ad Reinhardt and others, opened the floodgates to the diversity and scope of following artworks.

=== After abstract expressionism ===
In abstract painting during the 1950s and 1960s several new directions like Hard-edge painting and other forms of Geometric abstraction like the work of Frank Stella popped up, as a reaction against the subjectivism of Abstract expressionism began to appear in artist studios and in radical avant-garde circles. Clement Greenberg became the voice of Post-painterly abstraction; by curating an influential exhibition of new painting touring important art museums throughout the United States in 1964. Color field painting, Hard-edge painting and Lyrical Abstraction emerged as radical new directions.

By the late 1960s, Postminimalism, Process Art and Arte Povera also emerged as revolutionary concepts and movements encompassing painting and sculpture, via Lyrical Abstraction and the Postminimalist movement, and in early Conceptual Art. Process art as inspired by Pollock enabled artists to experiment with and make use of a diverse encyclopedia of style, content, material, placement, sense of time, and plastic and real space. Nancy Graves, Ronald Davis, Howard Hodgkin, Larry Poons, Jannis Kounellis, Brice Marden, Bruce Nauman, Richard Tuttle, Alan Saret, Walter Darby Bannard, Lynda Benglis, Dan Christensen, Larry Zox, Ronnie Landfield, Eva Hesse, Keith Sonnier, Richard Serra, Sam Gilliam, Mario Merz, Peter Reginato, Lee Lozano, were some of the younger artists emerging during the era of late modernism spawning the heyday of the art of the late 1960s.

== Movements ==
=== Performance art and happenings ===
Carolee Schneemann performing her piece Interior Scroll 1975. Yves Klein in France, and Carolee Schneemann, Yayoi Kusama, Charlotte Moorman, and Yoko Ono in New York City were pioneers of performance based works of art that often entailed nudity.

During the late 1950s and 1960s, artists with a wide range of interests began pushing the boundaries of Contemporary art. Yves Klein in France, and Carolee Schneemann, Yayoi Kusama, Charlotte Moorman, and Yoko Ono in New York City were pioneers of performance based works of art. Groups like The Living Theater with Julian Beck and Judith Malina collaborated with sculptors and painters creating environments; radically changing the relationship between audience and performer especially in their piece Paradise Now. The Judson Dance Theater located at the Judson Memorial Church, New York, and the Judson dancers, notably Yvonne Rainer, Trisha Brown, Elaine Summers, Sally Gross, Simonne Forti, Deborah Hay, Lucinda Childs, Steve Paxton and others collaborated with artists Robert Morris, Robert Whitman, John Cage, Robert Rauschenberg, and engineers like Billy Klüver. These performances were often designed to be the creation of a new art form, combining sculpture, dance, and music or sound, often with audience participation. The reductive philosophies of minimalism, spontaneous improvisation, and expressivity of Abstract expressionism characterized the works.

During the same period — the late 1950s through the mid-1960s - various avant-garde artists created Happenings. Happenings were mysterious and often spontaneous and unscripted gatherings of artists and their friends and relatives in varied specified locations. Often incorporating exercises in absurdity, physical exercise, costumes, spontaneous nudity, and various random and seemingly disconnected acts. Allan Kaprow, Joseph Beuys, Nam June Paik, Wolf Vostell, Claes Oldenburg, Jim Dine, Red Grooms, and Robert Whitman among others were notable creators of Happenings.

=== Assemblage art ===
Related to Abstract expressionism was the emergence of combined manufactured items — with artist materials, moving away from previous conventions of painting and sculpture. The work of Robert Rauschenberg, whose "combines" in the 1950s were forerunners of Pop Art and Installation art, and made use of the assemblage of large physical objects, including stuffed animals, birds and commercial photography, exemplified this art trend.

Leo Steinberg uses the term postmodernism in 1969 to describe Rauschenberg's "flatbed" picture plane, containing a range of cultural images and artifacts that had not been compatible with the pictorial field of premodernist and modernist painting. Craig Owens goes further, identifying the significance of Rauschenberg's work not as a representation of, in Steinberg's view, "the shift from nature to culture", but as a demonstration of the impossibility of accepting their opposition.

Steven Best and Douglas Kellner identify Rauschenberg and Jasper Johns as part of the transitional phase, influenced by Marcel Duchamp, between modernism and postmodernism. These artists used images of ordinary objects, or the objects themselves, in their work, while retaining the abstraction and painterly gestures of high modernism.

Anselm Kiefer also uses elements of assemblage in his works, and on one occasion, featured the bow of a fishing boat in a painting.

=== Pop art ===
Lawrence Alloway used the term "Pop art" to describe paintings celebrating consumerism of the post World War II era. This movement rejected Abstract expressionism and its focus on the hermeneutic and psychological interior, in favor of art which depicted, and often celebrated, material consumer culture, advertising, and iconography of the mass production age. The early works of David Hockney and the works of Richard Hamilton, John McHale, and Eduardo Paolozzi were considered seminal examples in the movement. While later American examples include the bulk of the careers of Andy Warhol and Roy Lichtenstein and his use of Benday dots, a technique used in commercial reproduction. There is a clear connection between the radical works of Duchamp, the rebellious Dadaist — with a sense of humor; and Pop Artists like Claes Oldenburg, Andy Warhol, Roy Lichtenstein and the others.

Thomas McEvilly, agreeing with Dave Hickey, says U.S postmodernism in the visual arts began with the first exhibitions of Pop art in 1962, "though it took about twenty years before postmodernism became a dominant attitude in the visual arts". Fredric Jameson, too, considers pop art to be postmodern.

One way Pop art is postmodern is it breaks down what Andreas Huyssen calls the "Great Divide" between high art and popular culture. Postmodernism emerges from a "generational refusal of the categorical certainties of high modernism".

=== Fluxus ===
Solo For Violin • Polishing as performed by George Brecht, New York, 1964. Photo by G Maciunas

Fluxus was named and loosely organized in 1962 by George Maciunas (1931–78), a Lithuanian-born American artist. Fluxus traces its beginnings to John Cage's 1957 to 1959 Experimental Composition classes at the New School for Social Research in New York City. Many of his students were artists working in other media with little or no background in music. Cage's students included Fluxus founding members Jackson Mac Low, Al Hansen, George Brecht and Dick Higgins. In 1962 in Germany Fluxus started with the: FLUXUS Internationale Festspiele Neuester Musik in Wiesbaden with, George Maciunas, Joseph Beuys, Wolf Vostell, Nam June Paik and others. And in 1963 with the: Festum Fluxorum Fluxus in Düsseldorf with George Maciunas, Wolf Vostell, Joseph Beuys, Dick Higgins, Nam June Paik, Ben Patterson, Emmett Williams and others.

Fluxus encouraged a do it yourself aesthetic, and valued simplicity over complexity. Like Dada before it, Fluxus included a strong current of anti-commercialism and an anti-art sensibility, disparaging the conventional market-driven art world in favor of an artist-centered creative practice. Fluxus artists preferred to work with whatever materials were at hand, and either created their own work or collaborated in the creation process with their colleagues.

Fluxus can be viewed as part of the first phase of postmodernism, along with Rauschenberg, Johns, Warhol and the Situationist International. Andreas Huyssen criticises attempts to claim Fluxus for postmodernism as, "either the master-code of postmodernism or the ultimately unrepresentable art movement – as it were, postmodernism's sublime." Instead he sees Fluxus as a major Neo-Dadaist phenomenon within the avant-garde tradition. It did not represent a major advance in the development of artistic strategies, though it did express a rebellion against, "the administered culture of the 1950s, in which a moderate, domesticated modernism served as ideological prop to the Cold War."

=== Minimalism ===
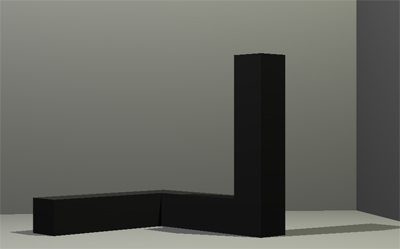
Tony Smith, Free Ride, 1962, 6'8 x 6'8 x 6'8 (the height of a standard US door opening), Museum of Modern Art, New York

By the early 1960s, Minimalism emerged as an abstract movement in art (with roots in geometric abstraction via Malevich, the Bauhaus and Mondrian) which rejected the idea of relational, and subjective painting, the complexity of Abstract expressionist surfaces, and the emotional zeitgeist and polemics present in the arena of Action painting. Minimalism argued extreme simplicity could capture the sublime representation art requires. Associated with painters such as Frank Stella, minimalism in painting, as opposed to other areas, is a modernist movement and depending on the context can be construed as a precursor to the postmodern movement.

Hal Foster, in his essay The Crux of Minimalism, examines the extent to which Donald Judd and Robert Morris both acknowledge and exceed Greenbergian modernism in their published definitions of minimalism. He argues minimalism is not a "dead end" of modernism, but a "paradigm shift toward postmodern practices that continue to be elaborated today".

=== Land art ===
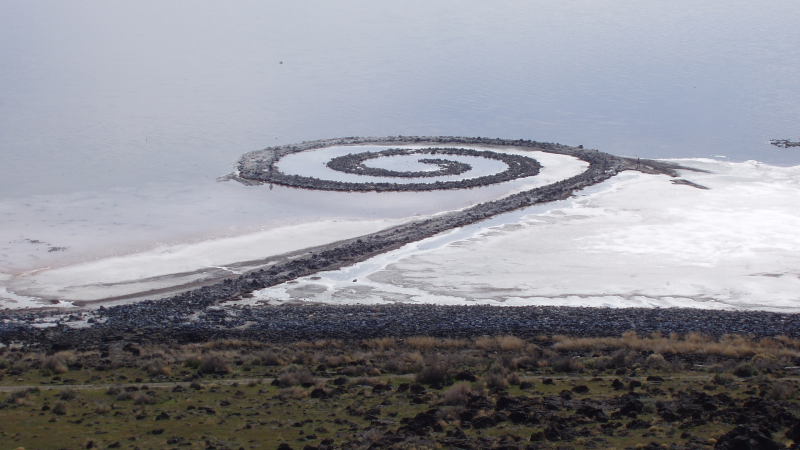
Robert Smithson, "Spiral Jetty" in mid-April 2005. It was created in 1970.

Land art, variously known as Earth art, environmental art, and Earthworks, is an art movement that emerged in the 1960s and 1970s, largely associated with Great Britain and the United States but that also includes examples from many other countries. As a trend, "land art" expanded the boundaries of traditional art making in the materials used and the siting of the works. The materials used are often the materials of the Earth, including the soil, rocks, vegetation, and water found on-site, and the sites are often distant from population centers. Though sometimes fairly inaccessible, photo documentation is commonly brought back to the urban art gallery.

Concerns of the art movement center around rejection of the commercialization of art-making and enthusiasm with an emergent ecological movement. The beginning of the movement coincided with the popularity of the rejection of urban living and its counterpart, and an enthusiasm for that which is rural. Included in these inclinations were spiritual yearnings concerning the planet Earth as home to humanity.

=== Postminimalism ===
Robert Pincus-Witten coined the term Post-minimalism in 1977 to describe minimalist derived art which had content and contextual overtones minimalism rejected. His use of the term covered the period 1966 – 1976 and applied to the work of Eva Hesse, Keith Sonnier, Richard Serra and new work by former minimalists Robert Smithson, Robert Morris, Sol LeWitt, and Barry Le Va, and others. Process art and anti-form art are other terms describing this work, which the space it occupies and the process by which it is made determines.

Rosalind Krauss argues by 1968 artists such as Morris, LeWitt, Smithson and Serra had "entered a situation the logical conditions of which can no longer be described as modernist". The expansion of the category of sculpture to include land art and architecture, "brought about the shift into postmodernism".

American sculptor Christopher Wilmarth could be considered a post-Minimalist alongside Eva Hesse and Bruce Nauman. Wilmarth’s work eschewed the perfect machine-made aesthetic of the minimalists, yet also resisted the process-oriented excess of much 1970s postminimalist sculpture.

Minimalists like Donald Judd, Dan Flavin, Carl Andre, Agnes Martin, John McCracken and others continued to produce their late modernist paintings and sculpture for the remainder of their careers.

=== Conceptual art ===
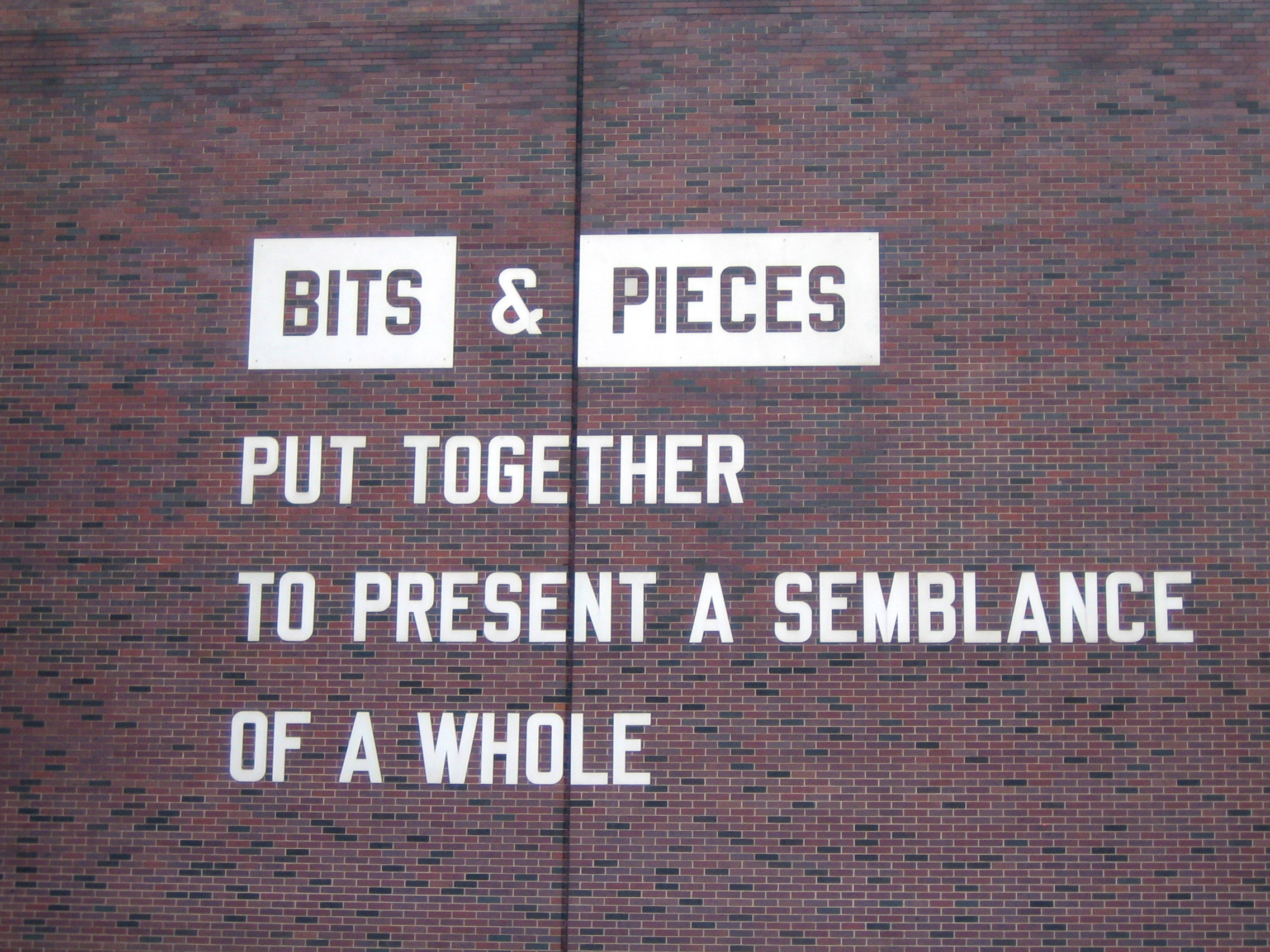
Lawrence Weiner, Bits & Pieces Put Together to Present a Semblance of a Whole, The Walker Art Center, Minneapolis, 2005

Conceptual art is sometimes labelled as postmodern because it is expressly involved in deconstruction of what makes a work of art, "art". Conceptual art, because it is often designed to confront, offend or attack notions held by many of the people who view it, is regarded with particular controversy.

Precursors to conceptual art include the work of Duchamp, John Cage's 4' 33", in which the music is said to be "the sounds of the environment that the listeners hear while it is performed", and Rauschenberg's Erased De Kooning Drawing. Many conceptual works take the position that art is created by the viewer viewing an object or act as art, not from the intrinsic qualities of the work itself. Thus, because Fountain was exhibited, it was a sculpture.

=== Figurative painting ===
Some currents of post-war figurative painting have been analyzed as postmodern. The Italian painter Carlo Maria Mariani was described as a postmodernist by American critics. According to Charles Jencks, Mariani's group portrait The Constellation of Leo (1980–1981), which depicts people from Italy's art world with references to mythology and art history, came to define a trope of postmodern art: "an ironic comment on a comment on a comment which signals the distance; a new myth thrice removed from its originating ritual".

=== Installation art ===
An important series of movements in art which have consistently been described as postmodern involved installation art and creation of artifacts that are conceptual in nature. One example being the signs of Jenny Holzer which use the devices of art to convey specific messages, such as "Protect Me From What I Want". Installation Art has been important in determining the spaces selected for museums of contemporary art in order to be able to hold the large works which are composed of vast collages of manufactured and found objects. These installations and collages are often electrified, with moving parts and lights.

They are often designed to create environmental effects, as Christo and Jeanne-Claude's Iron Curtain, Wall of 240 Oil Barrels, Blocking Rue Visconti, Paris, June 1962 which was a poetic response to the Berlin Wall built in 1961.

=== Lowbrow art ===
Lowbrow is a widespread populist art movement with origins in the underground comix world, punk music, hot-rod street culture, and other California subcultures. It is also often known by the name pop surrealism. Lowbrow art highlights a central theme in postmodernism in that the distinction between "high" and "low" art are no longer recognized.

=== Digital art ===
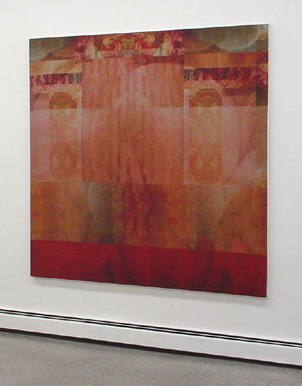
Joseph Nechvatal birth Of the viractual 2001 computer-robotic assisted acrylic on canvas

Digital art is a general term for a range of artistic works and practices that use digital technology as an essential part of the creative and/or presentation process. The impact of digital technology has transformed activities such as painting, drawing, sculpture and music/sound art, while new forms, such as net art, digital installation art, and virtual reality, have become recognized artistic practices.

Leading art theorists and historians in this field include Christiane Paul, Frank Popper, Christine Buci-Glucksmann, Dominique Moulon, Robert C. Morgan, Roy Ascott, Catherine Perret, Margot Lovejoy, Edmond Couchot, Fred Forest and Edward A. Shanken.

=== Intermedia and multi-media ===
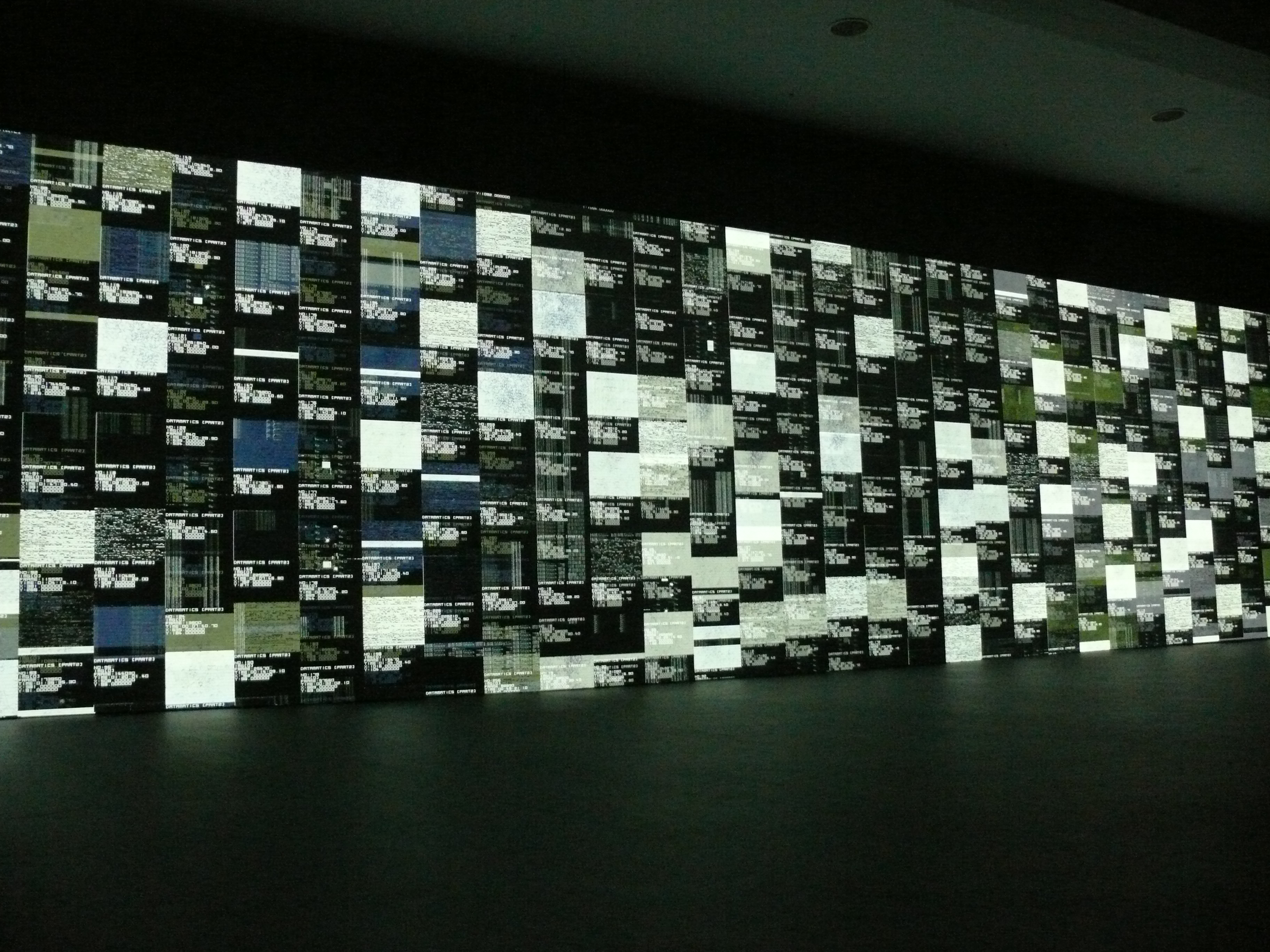
Data.Tron [8K Enhanced Version] by Ryoji Ikeda on show in transmediale 10

Another trend in art which has been associated with the term postmodern is the use of a number of different media together. Intermedia, a term coined by Dick Higgins and meant to convey new artforms along the lines of Fluxus, Concrete Poetry, Found objects, Performance art, and Computer art. Higgins was the publisher of the Something Else Press, a Concrete poet, married to artist Alison Knowles and an admirer of Marcel Duchamp. Ihab Hassan includes, "Intermedia, the fusion of forms, the confusion of realms," in his list of the characteristics of postmodern art. One of the most common forms of "multi-media art" is the use of video-tape and CRT monitors, termed Video art. While the theory of combining multiple arts into one art is quite old, and has been revived periodically, the postmodern manifestation is often in combination with performance art, where the dramatic subtext is removed, and what is left is the specific statements of the artist in question or the conceptual statement of their action. Higgin's conception of Intermedia is connected to the growth of multimedia digital practice such as immersive virtual reality, digital art and computer art.

=== Telematic Art ===
Telematic art is a descriptive of art projects using computer mediated telecommunications networks as their medium. Telematic art challenges the traditional relationship between active viewing subjects and passive art objects by creating interactive, behavioural contexts for remote aesthetic encounters. Roy Ascott sees the telematic art form as the transformation of the viewer into an active participator of creating the artwork which remains in process throughout its duration. Ascott has been at the forefront of the theory and practice of telematic art since 1978 when he went online for the first time, organizing different collaborative online projects.

=== Appropriation art and neo-conceptual art ===
Philip Taaffe, We Are Not Afraid, 1985

In his 1980 essay The Allegorical Impulse: Toward a Theory of Postmodernism, Craig Owens identifies the re-emergence of an allegorical impulse as characteristic of postmodern art. This impulse can be seen in the appropriation art of artists such as Sherrie Levine and Robert Longo because, "Allegorical imagery is appropriated imagery." Appropriation art debunks modernist notions of artistic genius and originality and is more ambivalent and contradictory than modern art, simultaneously installing and subverting ideologies, "being both critical and complicit".

=== Neo-expressionism and painting ===
The return to the traditional art forms of sculpture and painting in the late 1970s and early 1980s seen in the work of Neo-expressionist artists such as Georg Baselitz and Julian Schnabel has been described as a postmodern tendency, and one of the first coherent movements to emerge in the postmodern era. Its strong links with the commercial art market has raised questions, however, both about its status as a postmodern movement and the definition of postmodernism itself. Hal Foster states that neo-expressionism was complicit with the conservative cultural politics of the Reagan-Bush era in the U.S. Félix Guattari disregards the "large promotional operations dubbed 'neo-expressionism' in Germany," (an example of a "fad that maintains itself by means of publicity") as a too easy way for him "to demonstrate that postmodernism is nothing but the last gasp of modernism". These critiques of neo-expressionism reveal that money and public relations really sustained contemporary art world credibility in America during the same period that conceptual artists, and practices of women artists including painters and feminist theorists like Griselda Pollock, were systematically reevaluating modern art. Brian Massumi claims that Deleuze and Guattari open the horizon of new definitions of Beauty in postmodern art. For Jean-François Lyotard, it was painting of the artists Valerio Adami, Daniel Buren, Marcel Duchamp, Bracha Ettinger, and Barnett Newman that, after the avant-garde's time and the painting of Paul Cézanne and Wassily Kandinsky, was the vehicle for new ideas of the sublime in contemporary art.

=== Institutional critique ===
Critiques on the institutions of art (principally museums and galleries) are made in the work of Andrea Fraser, Michael Asher, Marcel Broodthaers, Daniel Buren and Hans Haacke.

== See also ==
- Anti-art
- Anti-anti-art
- Artificial intelligence art
- Classificatory disputes about art
- Cyborg art
- Electronic art
- Experiments in Art and Technology
- Gaze
- Late Modernism
- Modern art
- Modernist project
- Neo-minimalism
- Net.art
- New European Painting
- New Media art
- Post-conceptual
- Superflat
- Superstroke
- Remodernism
- Irving Sandler
- Virtual art

== Sources ==
- The Triumph of Modernism: The Art World, 1985–2005, Hilton Kramer, 2006, ISBN 978-0-15-666370-0
- Pictures of Nothing: Abstract Art since Pollock (A.W. Mellon Lectures in the Fine Arts), Kirk Varnedoe, 2003
- Art of the Postmodern Era: From the Late 1960s to the Early 1990s, Irving Sandler
- Postmodernism (Movements in Modern Art) Eleanor Heartney
- Sculpture in the Age of Doubt Thomas McEvilley 1999
