= Formalesque =

Art style

The term Formalesque was coined in 1994 by Australian art historian Bernard Smith to replace Modernism as the name of the artistic style of the period from around 1890 to 1960, now that this is no longer "modern".

Modernism had emerged as a generic term to replace Post-Impressionism for the paintings of Manet, Cézanne, van Gogh, and Gauguin. According to Smith, the key emphasis in such work is the importance of form and flatness. The term was soon applied also in architecture (e.g. Frank Lloyd Wright and Walter Gropius) and sculpture (e.g. Epstein and Brâncuși).

After 1960, Modernism was displaced by Postmodernism, and then by the art still at present referred to as "contemporary art". Since Modernism is no longer "modern", Smith argues that it requires a more appropriate period style name to distinguish it: hence his introduction of Formalesque. Like "romanesque" and "arabesque", the name is intended to indicate a style that arose by the development of a basic interest in form (but without the specific connotations of the term Formalism).

== See also ==
- Modernism
- Contemporary art
- Modern architecture
- Postmodern art
