= Nahlah Ayed =

Canadian journalist

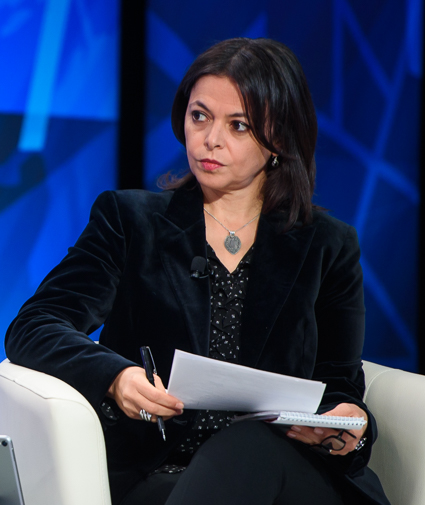
- Ayed at the Halifax International Security Forum in 2017
- Born: April 1970 (age 56); Winnipeg, Manitoba, Canada
- Education: University of Manitoba (BSc); Carleton University
- Occupations: Reporter, Correspondent, Author

Nahlah Ayed (Arabic: نهله عَايِد) is a Canadian journalist. She is currently the host of the academic documentary program Ideas on CBC Radio One and formerly a foreign correspondent with CBC News. Prior to that, she worked as a parliamentary correspondent with The Canadian Press. Her global reporting has garnered multiple awards, both domestic and international.

== Early life ==
Ayed was born in Winnipeg, Manitoba, in 1970 to Palestinian parents. The couple had immigrated to Canada in 1966 and lived in suburban Winnipeg until Ayed was six years old. Ayed's mother gave the children lessons in Arabic at home. The Ayed family moved to a Palestinian refugee camp in Amman, Jordan, where their relatives lived, to become acquainted with them and their culture. The family stayed there for seven years before moving back to Winnipeg in 1983.

After completing high school in Winnipeg, Ayed pursued a Bachelor of Science in genetics and a master's degree in interdisciplinary studies at the University of Manitoba. Her time as a writer with the student newspaper at the university led her to the Master of Journalism program at Carleton University in Ottawa, where she also worked as a freelance writer for the Ottawa Citizen newspaper. Shortly after graduating, Ayed began working as a parliamentary correspondent for The Canadian Press in 1997.

== Career ==
Ayed joined the CBC in 2002 on a freelance contract and, in 2003, served as the network's Amman correspondent during the American invasion of Iraq. Ayed spent months in Baghdad prior to the outbreak of the subsequent war, and later returned to report live from Baghdad as the city fell. Her coverage of Iraq in the aftermath earned her a Gemini Award nomination.

From 2004 until 2009, Ayed was the CBC's Beirut correspondent, covering events throughout the Middle East region, including the 2006 Lebanon War and the 2008–2009 Gaza War. She received her second Gemini Award nomination in 2010 for her coverage of the Iran presidential elections the year prior, and her third nomination for her coverage of the 2011 uprisings in Egypt.

In 2012, Ayed published her memoir, titled A Thousand Farewells: A Reporter's Journey from Refugee Camp to the Arab Spring, describing her early life and her experiences covering conflict in the Middle East. The book was a finalist for the 2012 Governor General's Literary Awards.

She joined the CBC's London, UK bureau in 2012, reporting on events such as Russia's annexation of Crimea, Brexit, and Europe's refugee crisis.

She returned to Canada in 2019 when it was announced that she would be the new host of Ideas, taking over from the retiring Paul Kennedy in September.

On May 28, 2024, Ayed published The War We Won Apart: The Untold Story of Two Elite Agents Who Became One of the Most Decorated Couples of WWII. She relates the factual account of two secret agents, Sonia Butt, a British woman, and Guy D'Artois, a French-Canadian soldier. They served in Winston Churchill's secret army, the Special Operations Executive, in separate parts of Nazi-occupied France.

== Awards ==
Year	Award name	Category	Organization	Work	Result
2004	Gemini Award	News Reportage, National	Academy of Canadian Cinema & Television	CBC News, The National (Coverage of postwar Iraq)	Nominated
2010	Gemini Award	News Reportage, National	Academy of Canadian Cinema & Television	CBC News, The National (Iran presidential elections)	Nominated
2011	Prix Italia	Best Interactive Website Linked to a TV or Radio Program	RAI	Exile Without End: Palestinians in Lebanon	Won
	Online Journalism Award	Digital Video Storytelling (Medium Site)	Online Journalism Awards	Exile Without End: Palestinians in Lebanon	Won
	Online Journalism Award	Multimedia Feature Presentation (Medium Site)	Online Journalism Awards	Exile Without End: Palestinians in Lebanon	Won
	Gemini Award	News Reportage, National	Academy of Canadian Cinema & Television	CBC News, The National: "Mubarak Refuses to Resign"	Nominated
2012	Governor General's Literary Award	Non-Fiction	Canada Council for the Arts	A Thousand Farewells: A Reporter's Journey from Refugee Camp to Arab Spring	Nominated
	Canadian Association for Journalists Award	JHR/CAJ Award for Human Rights Reporting	Canadian Association for Journalists	CBC News, The National: "Seeking Safety"	Won
	J-Source Award	Newsperson of the Year	Canadian Journalism Project		Nominated
2013	Canadian Screen Award	Best Web Program or Series, Non-Fiction	Academy of Canadian Cinema & Television	Exile Without End: Palestinians in Lebanon	Nominated
2015	Canadian Screen Award	News Reportage, National	Academy of Canadian Cinema & Television	CBC News, The National: "Charlie Hebdo"	Nominated
	Canadian Association for Journalists Award	Open Media	Canadian Association for Journalists	Refugee Crisis: Walking Across a Continent	Nominated
	Canadian Association for Journalists Award	JHR/CAJ Award for Human Rights Reporting	Canadian Association for Journalists	CBC News, The National: "Inside India's Gender Revolution"	Nominated
2016	Canadian Screen Award	News Reportage, National	Academy of Canadian Cinema & Television	CBC News, The National: "Trapped at the Border"	Won
	Canadian Screen Award	News or Information Segment	Academy of Canadian Cinema & Television	CBC News, The National: "Dirty Work"	Nominated
	Foreign Press Association Award	Story of the Year	Foreign Press Association	CBC News, The National: "Dirty Work"	Won
	Canadian Association for Journalists Award	Photojournalism Award	Canadian Association for Journalists	CBC News: "The Rescuers"	Won
	Canadian Association for Journalists	Open Broadcast News	Canadian Association for Journalists	CBC News, The National: "Rohingya Muslim Crisis"	Nominated
2019	Canadian Screen Award	Best National Reporter	Academy of Canadian Cinema & Television	CBC News, The National: "Rohingya Muslim Crisis"	Nominated

=== Undated awards ===
- The Canadian Press President's Award
- The LiveWire Award

=== Honorary degrees ===
- LL.D., University of Manitoba (2008)
- LL.D., Concordia University (2016)
- LL.D., University of Alberta (2018)
