= Massey Lectures =

Canadian lecture series

The Massey Lectures (advertised as the CBC Massey Lectures) is an annual five-part series of lectures given in Canada by distinguished writers, thinkers, and scholars who explore ideas and issues of contemporary interest. Created in 1961 by the Canadian Broadcasting Corporation (CBC) in honour of Vincent Massey, the founder of Massey College at the University of Toronto, a former Governor General of Canada and coordinator of the 1951 Massey Report, it is broadcast on CBC Radio One. It is widely regarded as one of the most acclaimed lecture series in the country.

Notable Massey lecturers have included Northrop Frye, John Kenneth Galbraith, Noam Chomsky, Jane Jacobs, Margaret Atwood, Ursula Franklin, George Steiner, Stephen Lewis, Claude Levi Strauss, and Nobel laureates Martin Luther King Jr., George Wald, Willy Brandt, and Doris Lessing.

== Sponsorship ==
The event is co-hosted by CBC Radio, House of Anansi Press and Massey College of the University of Toronto. The lectures have been broadcast by the CBC Radio show Ideas since 1965.

Prior to 1989, the lectures were recorded for broadcast in a CBC Radio studio in Toronto. From 1989 to 2002, the lectures were delivered before a live audience at the University of Toronto. Since 2002, the lectures have been presented and recorded for broadcast at public events in five different cities across Canada.

The lectures are broadcast each November on Ideas and published simultaneously in book form by House of Anansi Press.

Many of the lectures can be listened to online on the Ideas website, while others can be purchased on various sites.

In addition to the print version for each individual year, several of the earlier lectures are available in compilations, including The Lost Massey Lectures.

== Massey lecturers ==
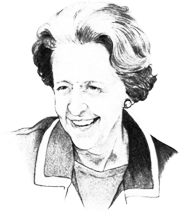
Barbara Ward, the first Massey Lecturer

- 1961 – Barbara Ward, The Rich Nations and the Poor Nations
- 1962 – Northrop Frye, The Educated Imagination
- 1963 – Frank Underhill, The Image of Confederation
- 1964 – C. B. Macpherson, The Real World of Democracy
- 1965 – John Kenneth Galbraith, The Underdeveloped Country
- 1966 – Paul Goodman, The Moral Ambiguity of America
- 1967 – Martin Luther King Jr., Conscience for Change
- 1968 – R. D. Laing, The Politics of the Family
- 1969 – George Grant, Time as History
- 1970 – George Wald, Therefore Choose Life
- 1971 – James Corry, The Power of the Law
- 1972 – Pierre Dansereau, Inscape and Landscape
- 1973 – Stafford Beer, Designing Freedom
- 1974 – George Steiner, Nostalgia for the Absolute
- 1975 – J. Tuzo Wilson, Limits to Science
- 1976 – No Lecture
- 1977 – Claude Lévi-Strauss, Myth and Meaning
- 1978 – Leslie Fiedler, The Inadvertent Epic
- 1979 – Jane Jacobs, Canadian Cities and Sovereignty Association
- 1980 – No Lecture
- 1981 – Willy Brandt, Dangers and Options: The Matter of World Survival
- 1982 – Robert Jay Lifton, Indefensible Weapons
- 1983 – Eric Kierans, Globalism and the Nation State
- 1984 – Carlos Fuentes, Latin America: At War with the Past
- 1985 – Doris Lessing, Prisons We Choose to Live Inside
- 1986 – No Lecture
- 1987 – Gregory Baum, Compassion and Solidarity: The Church for Others
- 1988 – Noam Chomsky, Necessary Illusions: Thought Control in Democratic Societies
- 1989 – Ursula Franklin, The Real World of Technology
- 1990 – Richard Lewontin, Biology as Ideology: The Doctrine of DNA
- 1991 – Charles Taylor, The Malaise of Modernity
- 1992 – Robert Heilbroner, Twenty-First Century Capitalism
- 1993 – Jean Bethke Elshtain, Democracy on Trial
- 1994 – Conor Cruise O'Brien, On the Eve of the Millennium
- 1995 – John Ralston Saul, The Unconscious Civilization
- 1996 – No Lecture (see Notes below)
- 1997 – Hugh Kenner, The Elsewhere Community
- 1998 – Jean Vanier, Becoming Human
- 1999 – Robert Fulford, The Triumph of Narrative
- 2000 – Michael Ignatieff, The Rights Revolution
- 2001 – Janice Stein, The Cult of Efficiency
- 2002 – Margaret Visser, Beyond Fate
- 2003 – Thomas King, The Truth About Stories
- 2004 – Ronald Wright, A Short History of Progress
- 2005 – Stephen Lewis, Race Against Time: Searching for Hope in AIDS-Ravaged Africa
- 2006 – Margaret Somerville, The Ethical Imagination
- 2007 – Alberto Manguel, The City of Words
- 2008 – Margaret Atwood, Payback: Debt and the Shadow Side of Wealth
- 2009 – Wade Davis, The Wayfinders: Why Ancient Wisdom Matters in the Modern World
- 2010 – Douglas Coupland, Player One: What is to Become of Us
- 2011 – Adam Gopnik, Winter: Five Windows on the Season
- 2012 – Neil Turok, The Universe Within: From Quantum to Cosmos
- 2013 – Lawrence Hill, Blood: The Stuff of Life
- 2014 – Adrienne Clarkson, Belonging: The Paradox of Citizenship
- 2015 – Margaret MacMillan, History's People: Personalities and the Past
- 2016 – Jennifer Welsh, The Return of History: Conflict, Migration and Geopolitics in the Twenty-First Century
- 2017 – Payam Akhavan, In Search of a Better World: A Human Rights Odyssey
- 2018 – Tanya Talaga, All Our Relations: Finding the Path Forward
- 2019 – Sally Armstrong, Power Shift: The Longest Revolution
- 2020 – Ronald J. Deibert, Reset: Reclaiming the Internet for Civil Society (shortlisted for the 2020 Donner Prize)
- 2021 – Esi Edugyan, Out of the Sun: On Art, Race and the Future
- 2022 – Tomson Highway, Laughing with the Trickster: On Sex, Death and Accordions
- 2023 – Astra Taylor, The Age of Insecurity: Coming Together as Things Fall Apart
- 2024 – Ian Williams, What I Mean To Say: Remaking Conversation in our Time
- 2025 – Alex Neve, Universal: Renewing Human Rights in a Fractured World
- 2026 – Leilani Farha, Housing Inc.: A Global Takeover and Our Fight for Home

=== Notes ===
For Lawrence Hill's Massey Lectures in 2013, the CBC Radio website featured a visual narrative to accompany that year's theme Blood: The Stuff of Life. The story included full-screen images of blood, animations that visually demonstrated historical attitudes towards blood and videos of people affected culturally by it.

1996 did not feature a lecture because Ideas producers and the selected Lecturer Robert Theobald could not agree on an appropriate manuscript for the programme. The theme was to have been on the future of work. Theobald later published his manuscript as Reworking Success: New Communities at the Millennium (1997).

== See also ==
- Watts Lectures
- Massey Foundation
- Massey Medal
- Reith Lectures
- Boyer Lectures
