= Kevin McCarey =

English filmmaker and author

- Occupations: Emmy and Peabody Award winning filmmaker and author
- Known for: National Geographic Television documentaries
- Notable work: Coyotes (1999), Extinction (2010)

Kevin McCarey is an Emmy and Peabody Award winning filmmaker and author. He has worked extensively for National Geographic Television and the Turner Networks as producer, writer and director of documentaries. His narrative film work includes festival winners Coyotes, San Juan Story and Extinction.

== Early career ==
McCarey was raised in the Hudson River Valley of New York. He graduated from SUNY Maritime College with a B.S. degree and a merchant marine deck officer's license. From 1967–1970, he sailed on merchant ships as third mate. Most were tramp freighters carrying explosive cargoes bound for Vietnam. These early adventures at sea are recounted in his memoir Oceans Apart: the Wanderings of a Young Mariner.

In 1970, he took a job as captain of a small research vessel in Puerto Rico. There, McCarey became involved in the controversy over the naval bombardment of the island of Culebra. This experience is recounted in his memoir Islands Under Fire: The Improbable Quest to Save the Corals of Puerto Rico, a book described as "rich with humor, misadventure and triumph" in a starred review by Publishers Weekly.

In the 1970s, McCarey worked on environmental studies in the Hudson River, and oceanographic studies in the North Atlantic and South Pacific.

== Career in film ==
In 1978 he left the sea to pursue a career in film. McCarey graduated from the University of Oregon in 1980 with an M.A. in Film Studies. In 1981, he was hired by Turner Broadcasting as a documentary filmmaker. There he worked as writer-director on the Peabody Award winning series Portrait of America. This acclaimed series, hosted by Hal Holbrook, created a portrait of America through its people and its landscape. McCarey's films documented such far-flung locales as American Samoa, Guam and the Marianas Islands—as well as Oregon, Rhode Island, Puerto Rico and the U.S. Virgin Islands.

In 1985, he produced and directed Trumpet of Conscience—a visual and musical interpretation of the last Christmas sermon of Martin Luther King Jr. Called "a rousing special" by the Atlanta Journal-Constitution, and given four stars by the Chicago Tribune, the film aired on the Turner Networks every Christmas for twelve years. In 1995, McCarey was series writer-director for Pirate Tales, a four-hour special blending dramatic reenactments and documentary footage. It was shot on location in the British Isles, the Caribbean, North Africa and aboard period sailing ships. Roger Daltrey hosted. "Writer-director Kevin McCarey pulls off an intelligent, densely detailed documentary/dramatization ..." wrote Variety.

His narrative work includes San Juan Story (1991), a comedy short he wrote and directed starring Jacobo Morales ("Bananas") and Rosana DeSoto ("La Bamba"). Premiering at the Kennedy Center, it won the Cine Golden Eagle and was among the final ten for a Best Live Action Short Oscar nomination. McCarey's feature debut as writer-director, Coyotes (1999), stars Leo Gannon ("Prince of Tides") and Kirsten Carmody ("From Earth to Moon"). It's the story of two drifters—a thirteen-year-old girl and her father—and their struggle for survival in the desert of Baja, Mexico. The film premiered in the 1999 Palm Springs International Film Festival and won the Best Feature Film Award at the Savannah International Film Festival.

His most recent narrative work, Extinction, (2010) is set in South Africa. An African boy whose village is struggling with AIDS befriends paleontologists studying an extinction event. This award-winning short screened in New York's Times Square as part of the NYC Film Festival.

In 1996, McCarey began a long association with National Geographic Film and Television. He made films on subjects ranging from giant squids to the lions of the Kalahari. He also wrote the NBC specials Okavango: Africa's Savage Oasis, Tigers of the Snow, Dolphins: the Wild Side and Storm of the Century. In 1999, he was writer and field producer for the two-hour Adventures in Time: the National Geographic Millennium Special which Daily Variety called "a bold, new vision underscoring the wizardry of writer Kevin McCarey."

In 2000, he joined the staff of National Geographic as supervising producer and/or writer of such Emmy-nominated films as Killer Cats of the Kalahari, Deadly Love and Wolf Pack which won the Emmy for Best Documentary Film in 2003.

McCarey's films are driven by his passion for adventure, travel and wildlife. They are notable for their stunning visuals and inspired narration. McCarey currently teaches filmmaking at the Savannah College of Art and Design.

== Selected filmography ==
- Extinction (2010) narrative short, writer-director
- Arctic Tale (2007) feature documentary, executive producer
- National Geographic Explorer: Roar: One Man's Pride (2004) writer-director
- National Geographic Explorer: Deadly Love (2004) writer, supervising producer
- National Geographic Explorer: Wolf Pack (2003) supervising producer
- National Geographic Explorer: Killer Cats of the Kalahari (2003) supervising producer
- Frederick Frieseke: Portrait of an American Impressionist (2000) writer-director
- Adventures in Time: the National Geographic Millennium Special (1999) writer-field producer
- Coyotes (1999), narrative feature, writer-director
- National Geographic Special: Dolphins, the Wild Side (1999) writer
- Gunfighters of the West, documentary mini-series, TLC (1998) director
- National Geographic Special: Sea Monsters (1998) writer/co-director
- National Geographic Special: Tigers of the Snow (1997) writer
- Pirate Tales, documentary miniseries, TBS (1997) writer-director
- San Juan Story, (1991) narrative short, writer-director
- Trumpet of Conscience, special, TBS (1985) producer-director
- Portrait of America, series, TBS (1983–87) writer-director

== Books ==
- Islands Under Fire: the Improbable Quest to Save the Corals of Puerto Rico, Ocean Publishing (2012)
- Oceans Apart: the Wanderings of a Young Mariner, The Glencannon Press (2016)
- Moonglow Bay: Stories by Kevin McCarey Glendalough Press (2021)

== Selected awards ==
- 2006: Emmy nomination, Best Documentary Writing, Kevin McCarey, Deadly Love
- 2004: Emmy Nomination, Best Documentary, Killer Cats of the Kalahari
- 2003: Emmy Award, Best Natural History Documentary, Wolf Pack
- 1999: Best Feature Film, Savannah Int'l Film Festival, Coyotes
- 1997: Emmy nomination, Best Documentary, Tigers of the Snow

Regional Emmy awards

- Emmy Award, Best Documentary Trumpet of Conscience
- Emmy Award, Best Director, Kevin McCarey, Portrait of America

Others

- 1991: CINE Golden Eagle Award, San Juan Story
- 1983: George Foster Peabody Award, Portrait of America
- 2017: Lifetime Achievement Award, National Marine Sanctuaries
