= Alex Neve =

Canadian human rights activist

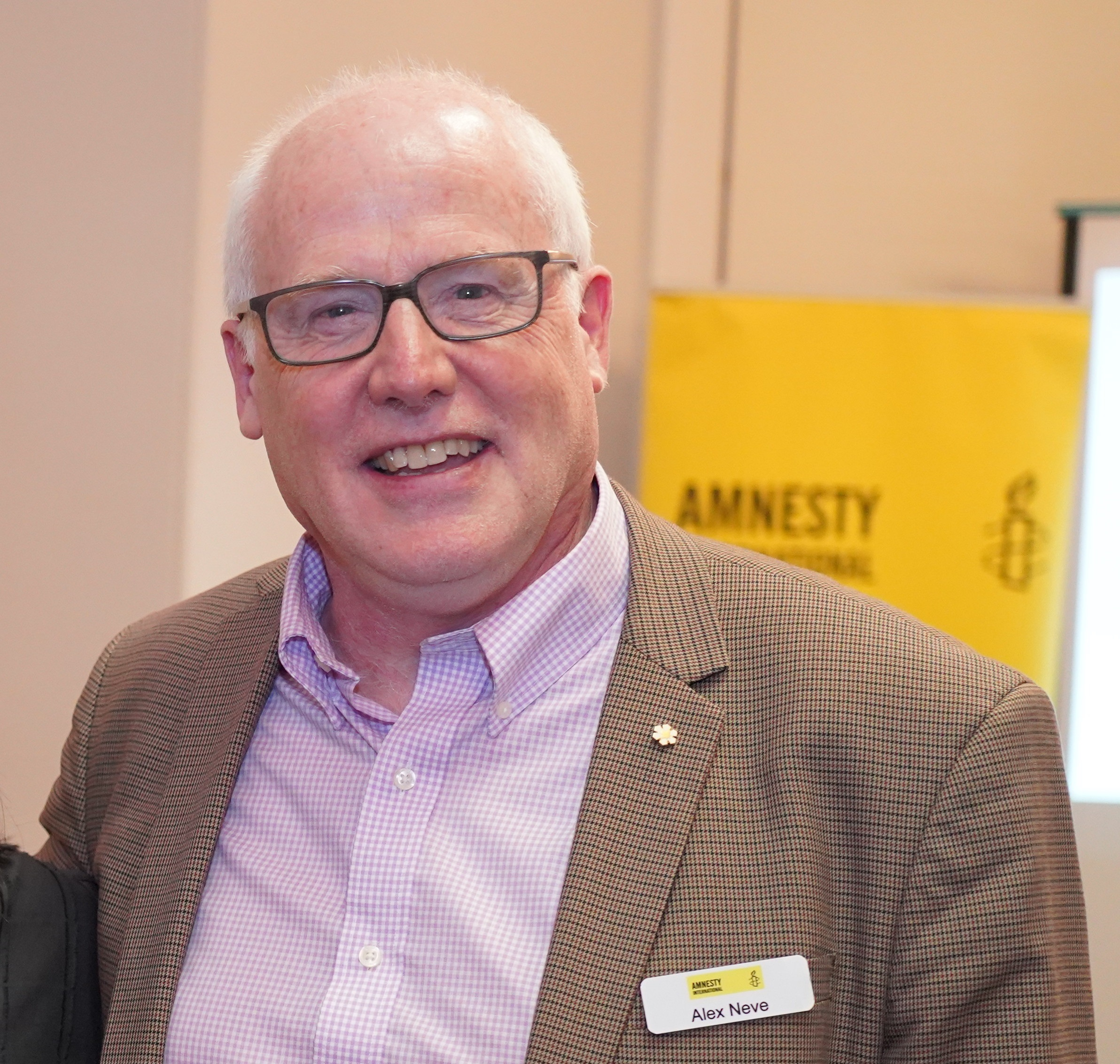
Alex Neve at the Amnesty International National Office - Ottawa

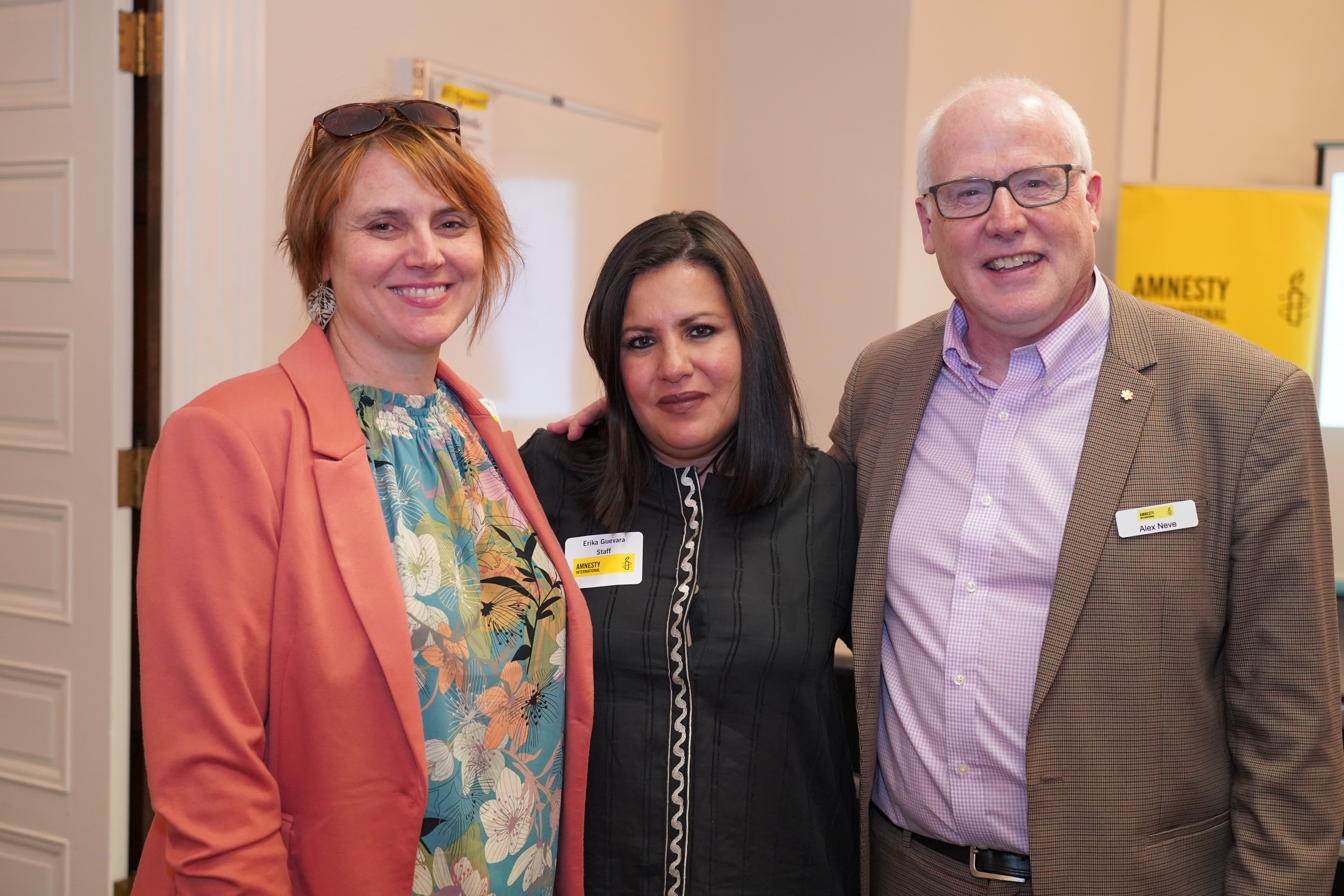
Alex Neve with Erika Guevara Rosas, Director for the Americas at the International Secretariat of Amnesty International and Tara Scurr, the Business and Human Rights Campaigner for Amnesty Canada

Robert Alexander Neve, OC (born May 24, 1962) is a Canadian human rights activist and international human rights lawyer. He served as the secretary general of Amnesty International Canada from January 2000 until October 2020.

== Personal life ==
Neve was born in Calgary, Alberta, to Robert Rex Neve and Jean Elizabeth Taylor. Neve received a Bachelor of Commerce degree in 1984 and a Bachelor of Laws degree in 1987, both from Dalhousie University. He later studied international human rights law at the University of Essex, and received a Master of Laws degree in 1991.

He is married to Patricia Goyeche and they have three children.

== Career ==
Neve practiced law in Ottawa with a focus in the areas of refugee and immigration law.

He has been a member of Amnesty International since the mid-1980s and has worked for the organization nationally and internationally in a number of different roles, including missions to Tanzania, Guinea, Mexico, Burundi, Chad, Colombia, Honduras, Zimbabwe, Côte d'Ivoire, South Africa, South Sudan, Bangladesh, and Ghana. He has authored and contributed to reports and studies for Amnesty International, as well as legal submissions to parliamentary committees and United Nations human rights bodies, including the Maher Arar Commission. He became secretary general of Amnesty International in January 2000.

Prior to becoming secretary general, Neve served as a member of the Immigration and Refugee Board of Canada.

In Toronto, he has also been affiliated with the Centre for Refugee Studies at York University and has taught international human rights and refugee law at Osgoode Hall Law School. Neve has also been involved with the issue of Alberta's Lubicon Cree.

Neve is currently a visiting and adjunct professor of international human rights law at the University of Ottawa and Dalhousie University, and a Senior Fellow with the Graduate School of Public and International Affairs at the University of Ottawa. He regularly posts on a range of human rights topics on his blog, Moving Rights Along. Neve frequently lectures, participates in conferences, and speaks and writes in the national media on a range of human rights topics.

Neve was the 2025 lecturer for the Massey Lectures, a lecture series cohosted by CBC Radio, House of Anansi Press, and Massey College at the University of Toronto, and author of the accompanying book, Universal: Renewing Human Rights in a Fractured World.

In December 2025, Neve was appointed as one of three expert members of the United Nations Human Rights Council's Independent International Fact-Finding Mission on Venezuela.

== Awards ==
On December 28, 2007, Neve was appointed an Officer of the Order of Canada, in honour of his human rights work.

In May 2009, he was awarded an Honorary Doctorate of Laws degree by the University of New Brunswick.

In June 2016, he was awarded an Honorary Doctorate of Laws degree by the University of Waterloo.

In May 2017, he was awarded an Honorary Doctorate of Laws degree from St. Thomas University.
