= Prisons We Choose to Live Inside =

Essays by Doris Lessing

- First edition
- Author: Doris Lessing
- Language: English
- Publisher: CBC Enterprises
- Publication date: 1986
- Publication place: Canada
- Media type: Print Paperback
- ISBN: 0-06-039077-8
- OCLC: 318276776
- Dewey Decimal: 823/.914 19
- LC Class: PR6023.E833 P7 1987

Prisons We Choose to Live Inside is a collection of five essays by the British writer Doris Lessing, which were previously delivered as the 1985 Massey Lectures.

== The essays ==
The five collected essays are generally meant to be read in order, though they can be read independently. The essays appear in the collection in the order that they were delivered as lectures. The titles of the essays are:

- When In the Future They Look Back On Us
- You Are Damned, We Are Saved
- Switching Off to See "Dallas"
- Group Minds
- Laboratories of Social Change
