= Player One =

Book by Douglas Coupland, October 2010

Player One What Is to Become of Us
- Author: Douglas Coupland
- Language: English
- Genre: Fiction
- Publisher: House of Anansi Press
- Publication date: October 2010
- Publication place: Canada
- Media type: Print (Paperback), Audio
- Pages: 246
- ISBN: 978-0-88784-972-5
- Preceded by: Generation A
- Followed by: Worst. Person. Ever.

Player One: What Is to Become of Us is a novel written by Douglas Coupland for the 2010 Massey Lectures. Each of the book's five chapters was delivered as a one-hour lecture in a different Canadian city: Vancouver on October 12, Regina on October 14, Charlottetown on October 19, Ottawa on October 25 and ending in Toronto on October 29. The lectures were broadcast on CBC Radio One's Ideas, November 8–12. The book was published by House of Anansi Press.

The plot follows four characters, Karen, Rick, Luke, and Rachel, as they arrive in the lounge of an airport bar, as they interact with one another, and as they cope with chaos that erupts as cataclysmic events occur. The story addresses their motivations and perceptions, as well as their thoughts on certain themes. There are several minor characters and a fifth main character, Player One, who retells the events that the four main characters experience but from the perspective of an outside observer, like someone exploring a video game environment.

== Background ==
In 2009, a panel of representatives, including Sarah MacLachlan of House of Anansi Press, John Fraser of Massey College and Ideas executive producer Bernie Lucht, selected Douglas Coupland to deliver the 2010 Massey Lectures. Coupland, a West Vancouver resident who would be 48 years old during the lectures, was best known for his previous novels Generation X (1991), jPod (2006), and Generation A (2009); he has also written non-fiction works and screenplays. Coupland did not immediately agree; after some thought, however, he accepted the panel's offer. He was given the creative freedom to select how the lecture would be delivered, and chose to write a novel. While previous novelists, such as Margaret Atwood and Thomas King, had delivered traditional academic lectures, Coupland felt that "a narrative seemed like the most efficient and accessible way of putting forth a large number of propositions about life in the year 2010."

== Synopsis ==
The book is divided into five chapters. Each chapter is divided into five parts, each describing events from the perspective of one of the five main characters: Karen, Rick, Luke, Rachel, and Player One. The first chapter, "Hour One: Cue the Flaming Zeppelin", has Karen arriving at the Toronto airport on a flight from Winnipeg to meet a man she met online. She sits on a stool at the airport hotel bar in which Rick is the bartender, Rachel is at a computer terminal, and Luke is sitting at a table drinking scotch. Rachel is there with the expectation to meet a man who can father her child and approaches Luke. Karen's date goes badly as she finds the man too assertive physically and too distant intellectually. A self-help guru, Leslie Freemont, enters with his assistant Tara to welcome Rick into his empowerment program; Leslie gives a speech to the group, takes Rick's money, and leaves. Meanwhile, oil prices rapidly increase and explosions start to occur outside. With the power unreliable, Karen, Rick, Luke, and Rachel run to Rick's vehicle to listen to the radio. Karen's date, Warren, is killed by a sniper as he runs to the group, who quickly return to the bar lounge where they barricade themselves in.

This is Player One here with your story upgrade. I know that you, as this story's user, may be curious and wondering what are the next sequences to come, so I will not tease. What will happen next is that Karen's head will continue to spin, and as with Rachel, Karen's brain will make a duplicate copy of the afternoon's events.

— Player One, as told from Player One's perspective in Hour Two, page 85.

In "Hour Three: God's little Dumpsters" Karen's daughter tells them, over the phone, of rioting and general chaos that is occurring. Rick and Luke crawl through the ventilation shafts to the roof to overpower the sniper but fail and retreat to the lounge. As chemical fall-out starts to land on the airport, the sniper seeks shelter in the lounge and is taken prisoner by the other characters. In "Hour Four: Hello, My Name Is: Monster" Rick and Rachel have sex, the sniper explains his motivations, and a teenager suffering from chemical burns seeks their help. In the final chapter "Hour Five: The View From Inside Daffy Duck's Hole" Karen and Luke tend to the teenager's wounds. Rachel discovers that the sniper is actually Leslie Freemont's son, and upon stating this, the sniper panics, manages to get his gun back and shoots Rachel. The final part of the final chapter is told from the combined point-of-view of Rachel and Player One, who exist in what is labeled as Eternity, and provide an epilogue revealing the fates of the characters.

=== Characters ===
- Karen — A divorced mother of one daughter, and a receptionist at a psychiatrist office, who travels from Winnipeg to Toronto to meet Warren, whom she met in an online forum.
- Rick — A divorced father of one son, and a recovering alcoholic, who works as a bartender at the Toronto Airport Camelot Hotel. He has been saving money to enroll in an empowerment program operated by Leslie Freemont.
- Luke — A pastor of a church in Nipissing, Ontario who lost his faith in religion, stole $20,000 from the church and fled to Toronto.
- Rachel — A young woman who operates a business that breeds lab mice and lives with psychological conditions on the Autism spectrum. Among her psychological conditions is prosopagnosia, as well as an inability to understand humour, metaphors, irony, or social cues. She wants to become pregnant to prove to her parents that she can lead what they consider a normal life.
- Player One — A disembodied voice who watches the events and comments on the character's past, present, and future actions and circumstances.
- Warren — The man who Karen is scheduled to meet at the hotel bar.
- Leslie Freemont — A self-help guru who operates the Power Dynamics Seminar System. He arrives with his assistant Tara to accept Rick into the program.
- Bertis — A religious fanatic, the son of Leslie Freemont, and the sniper on the bar's roof.
- Max — A teenager who tries to covertly take photos of Karen during their flight. He stumbles upon the group as he flees the chemical fall-out.

== Style and themes ==
Player One is the first Massey Lecture to be delivered as a work of fiction: a 50,000-word novel. The story is told as a first-person narrative with the perspective rotated between the five main characters: Karen, Luke, Rick, Rachel, and Player One. The narrative voice was described as being the typical "Coupland-esque coolness" with the "same apocalyptic feel" as his previous novel, Generation A. Rachel, though, speaks with a unique tone, devoid of emotion and unable to detect emotion in the voice of others, similar to how people communicate online without seeing one another, like via email.

The story's themes reflect many of the themes Coupland has addressed in his other works, including themes on time, religion, an afterlife, and communication. One reviewer mentioned that the book has "quintessential Coupland themes, chiefly, how the speed of change, both technologically and socially driven, is altering the world, our own sense of self and our souls". In relation to the Future Legend glossary at the end of the book Coupland said "The future is happening so fast and furious right now, there's no language to describe all these new sensations, so we have to begin inventing one".

== Publication and reception ==
The book was published by House of Anansi Press and released in October 2010 as Coupland began the Massey lecture series in Vancouver on October 12. Each lecture consisted of Coupland reading aloud one chapter, followed by questions from the audience and a book signing. The second lecture took place in Regina on October 14, followed by Charlottetown on October 19, Ottawa on October 25, and ending on October 29 in Toronto. The series was recorded then aired on CBC Radio One's Ideas between November 8 and 12. The book was long-listed for the Scotiabank Giller Prize.

The review in the Library Journal wrote that the book is "eminently readable, humorous, and philosophical if at times slightly lightweight" and that it "is a worthwhile novel that may also appeal to younger readers". By selecting Coupland, the Massey Lecture selection committee did intend to appeal to "a slightly younger demographic than previous Massey Lectures". In the Booklist review, Jonathan Fullmer writes, "A taut and scintillating exploration of time, Coupland's tale is both smart and suspenseful while simultaneously questioning the meaning of narration."
