= The Constellation of Leo =

1980–1981 painting by Carlo Maria Mariani

- Artist: Carlo Maria Mariani
- Year: 1980–1981
- Medium: Oil on canvas
- Dimensions: 340 cm × 450 cm (130 in × 180 in)
- Location: Galleria Nazionale d'Arte Moderna; Rome

The Constellation of Leo (Italian: La costellazione del leone) is a painting made by Carlo Maria Mariani in 1980–1981. It is a group portrait of prominent people from Italy's art world at the time, including Mariani himself, and has the subtitle The School of Rome (Italian: La scuola di Roma). It contains visual references to ancient sculptures, early modern paintings and contemporary artworks. It was exhibited in 1981 together with Mariani's comments about the people portrayed. It is in the collection of the Galleria Nazionale d'Arte Moderna in Rome.

== Subject and composition ==
The Constellation of Leo (The School of Rome) was painted in oil on canvas and has the dimensions 340 by 450 centimetres (130 in × 180 in). It was made in 1980–1981 and took a year to create. The title refers to the painter Carlo Maria Mariani's astrological sign, Leo.

A group of people from Italy's contemporary art world are portrayed. Mariani is seated in the centre, wearing the Accademia di San Luca's cloak and holding a drawing of the Medusa Rondanini. The other people are, from left to right, the artist Gino De Dominicis who sits facing away from the viewer, the critic and curator Achille Bonito Oliva in a red toga, an allegorical personification of Rome, the German art dealer Paul Maenz in the hat from Goethe in the Roman Campagna, Mario Diacono behind Goethe's Good Fortune stone, the face of Jannis Kounellis on a mask worn by a putto, the art dealer Gian Enzo Sperone who reads a letter, Luigi Ontani as Ganymede who ascends with an eagle, the critic Italo Mussa together with a muse with a hermaphrodite at her feet, the artists Francesco Clemente and Sandro Chia, the collector Giorgio Franchetti, the artist Mario Merz with the Farnese Hercules' body and standing in a tub, and the American artist Cy Twombly on horseback and with an SPQR banner. Chia and Clemente represented the Transavantgarde movement, on which Bonito Oliva recently had written a book. Merz was painted naked as a representative of Arte Povera. The castle of Genazzano and the Pyramid of Cestius are visible in the background.

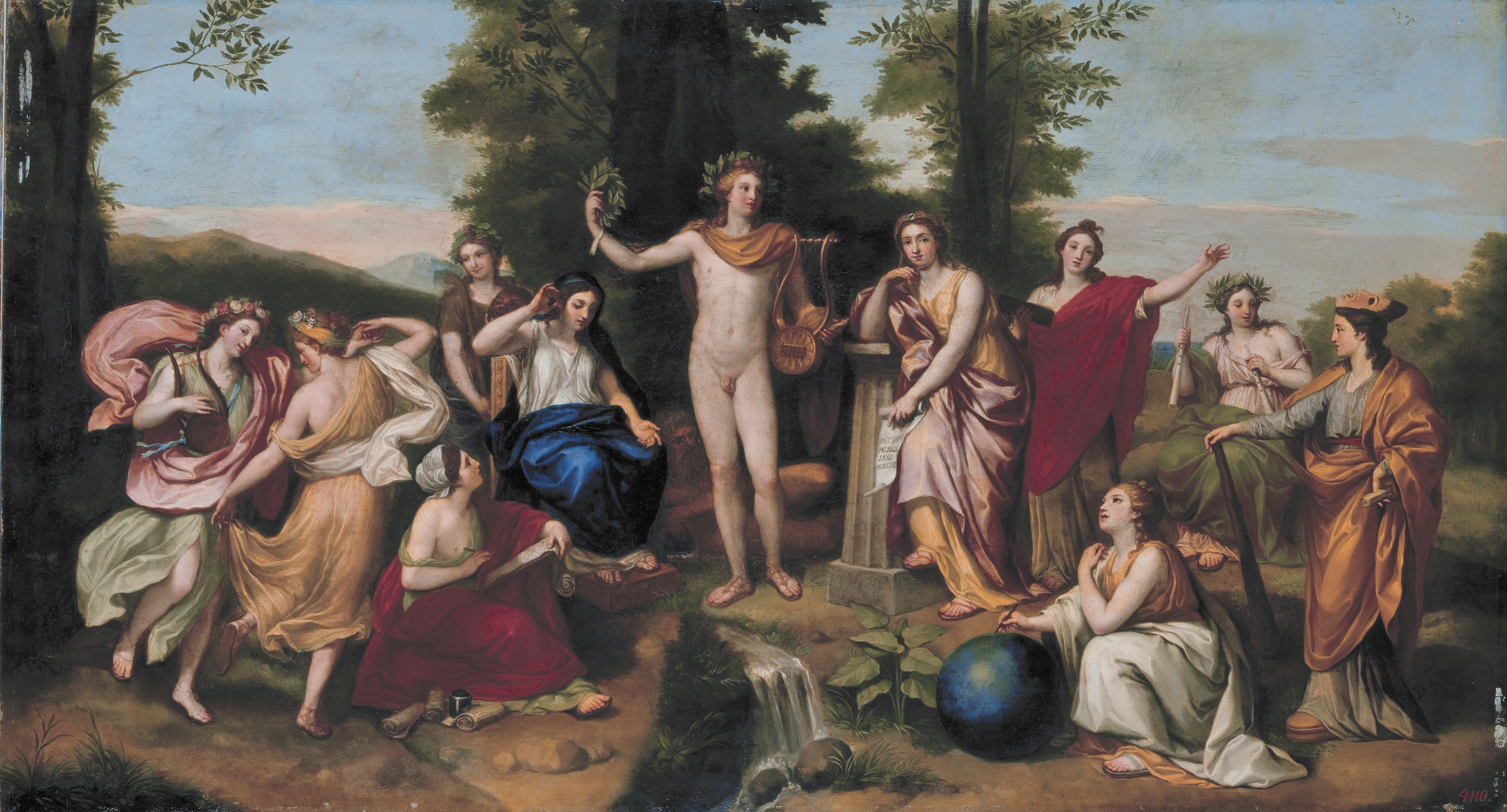
Parnassus (1761) by Anton Raphael Mengs was a source of inspiration.

Mariani was inspired by the fresco Parnassus, made by Anton Raphael Mengs for the Villa Albani in 1761, which in turn was inspired by Raphael's paintings for the Stanza della Segnatura. There are visual references to contemporary artworks such as Giulio Paolini's sculpture Mimesi, Renaissance art and The Apotheosis of Homer by Jean-Auguste-Dominique Ingres.

== Analysis and reception ==
The Constellation of Leo is one of Mariani's most famous works. It received much attention in 1981 and 1982, was reproduced in many periodicals and contributed to bringing back figuration in avant-garde painting. Charles Jencks praised it as a work that came to define a trope within postmodern painting: "an ironic comment on a comment on a comment which signals the distance; a new myth thrice removed from its originating ritual". Joan Casademont of Artforum wrote that The Constellation of Leo may contain private humour, but comes off as a serious work about "the timeless nature of creativity", and stands out among Mariani's paintings because of its "provocative strain of visual self-aggrandizement". The art historian Bente Kiilerich writes that the painting is characterised by "friendly irony", as Mariani used allusions and symbols to portray the currents of Italian art as one constellation, not as poles in opposition to each other. She connects the Medusa image to what she thinks was Mariani's intention: "Like Medusa, visual images, whether ancient or modern, must continue to bewilder and fascinate."

== Provenance ==
The Constellation of Leo was exhibited as the title work of a solo exhibition at the Galleria Gian Enzo Sperone in Rome, starting on 5 June 1981. Mariani's paintings Ganimede (1981) and Eros e Psiche (1979) were also part of the exhibition and each painting was placed next to a preparatory cartoon. The Constellation of Leo was accompanied by a typewritten text that said "not without a trace of irony". Mariani wrote comments about each person portrayed, which were part of the exhibition. The same show was held at Sperone Westwater in New York City in 1982. The Constellation of Leo was part of documenta 7 in Kassel in 1982.

The Constellation of Leo is in the collection of the Galleria Nazionale d'Arte Moderna in Rome. Several of the people it portrays appear in a portrait series of Italian and American artists that Mariani made in 1986.
