= Carlo Maria Mariani =

Italian painter (1931–2021)

- Born: 25 July 1931; Rome, Italy
- Died: 19 November 2021 (aged 90); New York City, NY
- Known for: Painting

Carlo Maria Mariani (25 July 1931 – 19 November 2021) was an Italian painter.

== Career ==
His paintings are rooted both in neoclassicist theory and modernism. In the 1970s he defended his choice of medium from attacks by art critics by making parallels between the melancholy for the past of neoclassicism and the then trendy conceptual art. He received international attention in the 1980s with what was called pittura colta ("cultivated painting") and la Nuova Maniera ("The New Style") in Italy, in which he employed old subjects and styles. Among other things he depicted Andy Warhol as Napoleon and made "improved" and "corrected" versions of works by Leonardo da Vinci and Raphael. One of his most famous paintings is The Constellation of Leo (1980–1981), a group portrait of people from Italy's art world, which is in the collection of the Galleria Nazionale d'Arte Moderna in Rome.

In the United States, Mariani's works were called postmodernism; the American art critic Hal Foster made a distinction between postmodernisms rooted in "reaction" and "resistance", and placed Mariani with his shameless use of "worn-out" styles in the former category. William Wilson of the Los Angeles Times described a Mariani exhibition in Los Angeles in 1992 as "an extraordinarily complex, beautifully executed attempt to make classical drawing and painting meaningful again."
