= Phyllis Webb =

Canadian poet and broadcaster (1927–2021)

Phyllis Webb OC
- Born: April 8, 1927; Victoria, British Columbia, Canada
- Died: November 11, 2021 (aged 94); Salt Spring Island, British Columbia, Canada
- Occupations: Poet; radio broadcaster
- Writing career
- Notable works: Naked Poems (1965); Wilson's Bowl (1980)
- Notable awards: Governor General's Award (1982)

Phyllis Webb OC (April 8, 1927 – November 11, 2021) was a Canadian poet and broadcaster.

Webb's poetry had diverse influences, ranging from neo-Confucianism to the field theory of composition developed by the Black Mountain poets. Critics have described her collections Naked Poems (1965) and Wilson's Bowl (1980) as important works in contemporary Canadian literature.

As a broadcaster at the Canadian Broadcasting Corporation (CBC) in the 1960s, Webb created programs including Ideas and Extension, a television program about Canadian poetry. She left the CBC in 1967 to return to British Columbia, where she remained for much of her life.

== Early life and education ==
Phyllis Webb was born on April 8, 1927, in Victoria, British Columbia. She attended the University of British Columbia, where she received a BA in English and philosophy in 1949, and McGill University. In 1949, aged 22, she ran as a candidate for the Co-operative Commonwealth Federation in the 1949 British Columbia general election. In 1957 Webb won a grant that allowed her to study theatre in France.

== Poetry ==
Webb's first poems were published in Contemporary Verse, a magazine run by Alan Crawley. Her first book publication was in Trio, a collection of poems by Eli Mandel, Gael Turnbull, and Webb published by Raymond Souster's Contact Press. In the 1950s, Webb became interested in Eastern philosophy; critic Pauline Butling suggests that Webb's early work shows the influence of neo-Confucianism's metaphysics of time.

Webb's approach shifted in the 1960s toward a model of poetry influenced by the field theory of composition developed by Charles Olson and the Black Mountain poets. The field theory was a jumping-off point for Naked Poems, which she started in 1963 and published in 1965. George Bowering describes Naked Poems as a "key text in contemporary Canadian literature". Wilson's Bowl (1980) adopts a new poetics centred on a critique of political and interpersonal power, drawing from Haida stories "to undermine the binary structures of Western thought". Critic Northrop Frye called it a "landmark". Webb composed the poems in Hanging Fire (1990) by waiting for words to arrive in her mind. She said in an interview that adopting this passive stance allowed her to focus more on the external world.

Webb taught creative writing at the University of British Columbia, the University of Victoria, and the Banff Centre, and was writer-in-residence at the University of Alberta from 1980 to 1981.

Webb's poems often concern death, particularly suicide.

== Broadcasting ==
Beginning in 1964, Webb worked as a writer and broadcaster for the Canadian Broadcasting Corporation (CBC). In 1965 she created, with William A. Young, the radio program Ideas. From 1967 to 1969, Webb was its executive producer. In 1967, she travelled to the Soviet Union, carrying out research on the anarchist Peter Kropotkin; she later proposed, but did not complete, a cycle of poems called "The Kropotkin Poems". Also in 1967, Webb created the CBC television program Extension, a series about Canadian poetry.

== Honours ==
In 1980, Webb was awarded a prize of CA$2,300 by fellow Canadian poets in recognition of her book Wilson's Bowl, which was overlooked for a Governor General's Award nomination that year. The award citation stated, in part, "this gesture is a response to your whole body of work as well as to your presence as a touchstone of true good writing in Canada, which we all know is beyond awards and prizes".

Webb won the Governor General's Literary Award for Poetry, 1982, for The Vision Tree.

She won Canada Council awards in 1981 and 1987.

She became an officer of the Order of Canada in 1992.

== Personal life ==
Soon after Extension finished, Webb moved from Toronto to Salt Spring Island, British Columbia, where she lived for much of her life. Webb died at Lady Minto Hospital on Salt Spring Island on November 11, 2021.

== Bibliography ==
=== Poetry ===
- Trio: First Poems by Gael Turnbull, Phyllis Webb, and Eli Mandel. Toronto: Contact Press, 1954.
- Even Your Right Eye. Toronto: McClelland & Stewart, 1956.
- In a Garden of the Pitti Palace; A Pang Cantata: 2 New Poems. Vancouver: Pica Press, 1961.
- The Sea is Also a Garden: Poems. Toronto: Ryerson Press, 1962.
- Naked Poems. Vancouver: Periwinkle Press, 1965.
- For Fyodor. Toronto: Mongrel, 1973.
- Wilson's Bowl. Toronto: Coach House Press, 1980.
- The Bowl. Lantzville, BC: Island Magazine, 1981.
- Talking. Montreal: Quadrant Editions, 1982.
- Sunday Water: Thirteen Anti-Ghazals. Lantzville, BC: Island Writing Series, 1982.
- Prison Report. Vancouver: Slug Press, 1982.
- Water and Light: Ghazals and Anti-Ghazals: Poems. Toronto: Coach House Press, 1984.
- Hanging Fire. Toronto: Coach House Press, 1990.
- Hulcoop, John, ed. Selected Poems, 1954–1965. Vancouver: Talonbooks, 1971.
- Thesen, Sharon, ed. Selected Poems: The Vision Tree. Vancouver: Talonbooks, 1982.
- Hulcoop, John, ed. Peacock Blue: The Collected Poems. Vancouver: Talonbooks, 2014.

=== Prose ===
- Nothing but Brush Strokes: Selected Prose. Edmonton, AB: NeWest, 1995.

=== Edited ===
- The Griffin Poetry Prize Anthology: A Selection of the 2004 Shortlist. Toronto: House of Anansi Press, 2004.

== Sources ==
- Butling, Pauline (August 24, 2009). "Phyllis Webb as Public Intellectual". In Brandt, Di; Godard, Barbara (eds.). Wider Boundaries of Daring: The Modernist Impulse in Canadian Women's Poetry. Wilfrid Laurier University Press. ISBN 978-1-55458-032-3.
- Butling, Pauline (1997). Seeing in the Dark: The Poetry of Phyllis Webb. Wilfrid Laurier University Press. ISBN 0-585-18356-2. OCLC 44963039.
- Collis, Stephen (2007). Phyllis Webb and the Common Good: Poetry, Anarchy, Abstraction. Talonbooks. ISBN 978-0-88922-559-6. OCLC 82772035.
- Frey, Cecelia (1985). "Phyllis Webb: An Annotated Bibliography". In Lecker, Robert; David, Jack (eds.). The Annotated Bibliography of Canada's Major Authors. Vol. 6. ECW Press. pp. 389–448. ISBN 0-920802-08-7. OCLC 6489562.
- McLeod, Katherine (2019). "Poetry on TV: Unarchiving Phyllis Webb's CBC-TV Program, Extension (1967)". In Camlot, Jason; McLeod, Katherine (eds.). CanLit Across Media: Unarchiving the Literary Event. McGill–Queen's University Press. doi:10.2307/j.ctvscxtkg.8. ISBN 978-0-7735-5981-3. OCLC 1109389484. S2CID 242218949.
