= Paul Kennedy (host) =

- Born: St. Catharines, Ontario, Canada
- Education: Queen's University; University of Edinburgh
- Occupation: Journalist
- Employer: Canadian Broadcasting Corporation
- Notable work: Ideas (1999–2019)

Paul Kennedy is a broadcast journalist who worked at the Canadian Broadcasting Corporation. He is a veteran broadcaster and award-winning documentarist, and is best known for being the host of the program Ideas on CBC Radio One from 1999 to his retirement in 2019.

In 1977, he researched and wrote his first documentary segment (on the subject of the fur trade), titled The Fur Trade Revisited. This was featured in an Ideas series entitled Red Man, White World.

While hosting Ideas, Kennedy continued to do documentary work.

== Education ==
Born and raised in St. Catharines, Ontario, Kennedy has a Bachelor of Arts degree from Queen's University, Kingston, Ontario, and a Master of Letters degree from the University of Edinburgh, Scotland. He has also done postgraduate work at the University of Toronto, where he studied with the media theoretician Marshall McLuhan.

== Awards ==
- ACTRA award for best Canadian radio documentary for War on the Home Front, co-authored with Timothy Findley
- B'nai B'rith Media Human Rights Award for Nuremberg on Trial
- Woods Hole Oceanographic Institution Special Citation for Excellence in Ocean Science Journalism (2005), for Learning from the Oceans
