= A Thousand Small Sanities =

2019 nonfiction book by Adam Gopnik

A Thousand Small Sanities: The Moral Adventure of Liberalism
- First edition
- Author: Adam Gopnik
- Language: English
- Subject: Political science, Liberalism
- Genre: Non-fiction
- Publisher: Basic Books
- Publication date: May 14, 2019
- Publication place: United States
- Media type: Print, CD, E-book
- Pages: 272
- ISBN: 978-1541699359
- OCLC: 1051137376

A Thousand Small Sanities: The Moral Adventure of Liberalism is a non-fiction book about liberalism written by American writer Adam Gopnik. It was published by Basic Books on May 14, 2019, to mixed reviews.

== Summary ==
The premise of the book is that liberalism and liberals are under attack, from both the right and the left. It argues that liberalism is more than "political centrism or the idea of free markets" and thus is an overarching concern for "positive, inclusive changes at all social and political levels," through which Gopnik attempts to clarify the definition of "liberalism".

== Themes ==
The book explores concepts surrounding liberalism, pragmatism, humanism, and conservatism. After covering the roots of liberalism and conservatism, the book discusses historical people that are deemed liberal in the present, but who were not deemed liberals in their own time, avoiding popular liberal references of 17-18th century Western philosophers and Founding Fathers in favor of figures such as Harriet Taylor, Frederick Douglass, Emma Goldman, Bayard Rustin, George Eliot, and E. D. Morel, among others.

Gopnik also argues for incremental, inclusive liberalism, and that engaging in the "extremes of the far-left" will attempt "to define liberty for everyone"—an attitude he argues has historically resulted in the formation of totalitarian regimes. The book attempts to steer Democrats away from 2020-era progressive policies and towards a liberalism that is "sensible, skeptical, cautious, reformist, and moderate—a path to centrist "political safety" between the so-called extremes of the left and the right.

== Reception ==
David Sessions heavily criticized the book in his review for The New Republic, stating that, "A Thousand Small Sanities is not about politics but about feelings toward politics," and that the book, "lacked a fundamental understanding of political & economic power." Gabino Iglesias on the other hand praised the book in his review for the National Public Radio, calling it a "Sophie's World [for] politically engaged adults," for its capacity to simplify 'complex concepts,' but acknowledged that it had inherently polarizing aspects that made it, "impossible to engage with on only one level, or to agree or disagree with [in] entirety."
