= Conscience for Change =

Book of lectures by Martin Luther King Jr.

- First edition
- Author: Martin Luther King Jr.
- Publisher: CBC
- Publication date: 1967

Conscience for Change is a book of transcribed lectures by Martin Luther King Jr. that includes five talks King gave in late 1967 for the Canadian Broadcasting Corporation's Massey Lectures. First published by the CBC, the book was later republished as The Trumpet of Conscience with a foreword by his widow, Coretta Scott King.

Dr. King's lectures included in the book are Impasse in Race Relations, Conscience and the Vietnam War, Youth and Social Action, Nonviolence and Social Change, and a live broadcast of Dr. King's 1967 sermon at Ebenezer Baptist Church, A Christmas Sermon on Peace.

== See also ==
- "Beyond Vietnam: A Time to Break Silence", 1967 speech by King
- Bibliography of Martin Luther King Jr.
