= Inscape (disambiguation) =

Inscape and instress are complementary and enigmatic concepts about individuality and uniqueness derived by the poet Gerard Manley Hopkins.

Inscape may also refer to:

- Inscape (album), the 2018 album from Canadian composer Alexandra Stréliski
- Inscape (company), a short-lived publisher of video games in the 1990s
- Inscape (Copland), a 1967 musical composition by Aaron Copland
- Inscape (visual art), an artistic term conveying the notion of an artist's psyche as an interior landscape
