= Paris to the Moon =

- Author: Adam Gopnik
- Language: English
- Publisher: Random House
- Publication date: 2000
- Publication place: United States
- Media type: Print (Hardback, Paperback)
- ISBN: 0375758232

Paris to the Moon (2000, ISBN 0-375-75823-2, Random House) is a book of essays by The New Yorker writer Adam Gopnik.

== Overview ==
The essays detail life in modern Paris and what drew author Gopnik to Paris.
