= Adam Gopnik =

American-Canadian writer (born 1956)

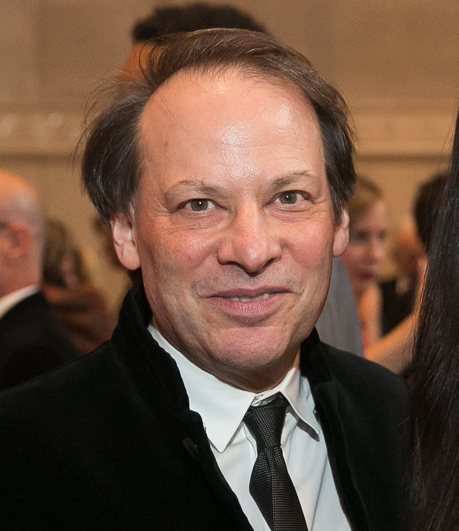
- Gopnik in 2014
- Born: August 24, 1956 (age 70); Philadelphia, Pennsylvania, U.S.
- Education: McGill University (BA)
- Occupations: Writer; essayist; commentator
- Parent: Myrna Gopnik (mother)
- Relatives: Alison Gopnik (sister); Blake Gopnik (brother)
- Writing career
- Period: 1986–present
- Website: adamgopnik.com

Adam Gopnik (born August 24, 1956) is an American-Canadian writer and essayist. He is best known as a staff writer for The New Yorker, to which he has contributed nonfiction, fiction, memoir, and criticism since 1986.

He is the author of nine books, including Paris to the Moon, Through the Children's Gate, The King in the Window, and A Thousand Small Sanities: The Moral Adventure of Liberalism. In 2020, his essay "The Driver's Seat" was cited as the most-assigned piece of contemporary nonfiction in the English-language syllabus.

== Early life and education ==
Gopnik was born to a Jewish family in Philadelphia and raised in Montreal. His family lived at Habitat 67. Both his parents were professors at McGill University; father Irwin was a professor of English literature and mother Myrna was a professor of linguistics. During a storytelling session for The Moth in 2014, Gopnik explained that his paternal grandfather and maternal grandmother fell in love with each other, left their respective spouses and married.

Gopnik studied at Dawson College and then at McGill University, earning a BA in art history. At McGill, he contributed to The McGill Daily. He completed graduate work at the New York University Institute of Fine Arts.

Gopnik studied art history and with his friend Kirk Varnedoe curated the 1990 High/Low show at New York's Museum of Modern Art. He later wrote an article for Search Magazine on the connection between religion and art and the compatibility of Christianity and Darwinism. He states in the article that the arts of human history are products of religious thought and that human conduct is not guaranteed by religion or secularism.

== Career ==
=== The New Yorker ===
In 1986, he began his long association with The New Yorker with a piece that would show his future range, a consideration of connections among baseball, childhood, and Renaissance art. He has written for four New Yorker editors: William Shawn, Robert Gottlieb, Tina Brown, and David Remnick. Gopnik has contributed fiction, humor, book reviews, profiles, and internationally reported pieces to the magazine. After writing his first piece for the magazine in 1986, Gopnik became the magazine's art critic. He worked in this position from 1987 to 1995, after which he became the magazine's Paris correspondent.

In 1995, The New Yorker dispatched him to Paris to write the "Paris Journals", in which he described life in that city. These essays were later collected and published by Random House in 2000 in Paris to the Moon, after Gopnik had returned to New York City. The book became a bestseller on The New York Times Best Seller list.

After five years in Paris, Gopnik returned to New York to write a journal on life in the city. Gopnik continues to contribute to The New Yorker as a staff writer. In recent years, he has written extensively about gun control and gun violence in the United States.

=== Books ===
In addition to Paris to the Moon, Random House published the author's reflections on life in New York, and particularly the comedy of parenting, Through the Children's Gate, in 2006. (As in the earlier memoir, much of the material had appeared previously in The New Yorker.) In 2005, Hyperion Books published his children's novel The King in the Window about Oliver, an American boy living in Paris, who is mistaken for a mystical king and stumbles upon an ancient battle waged between Window Wraiths and the malicious Master of Mirrors.

A book on Abraham Lincoln and Charles Darwin, called Angels and Ages, followed in January 2009. In 2010, Hyperion Books published his children's fantasy novel The Steps Across the Water which chronicles the adventures of a young girl, Rose, in the mystical city of U Nork.

In 2011, Gopnik was chosen to deliver the 50th Massey Lectures, where he presented five lectures in five Canadian cities on the ideas expounded in his book Winter: Five Windows on the Season.

His book The Table Comes First (2011), is about food, cooking and restaurants.

In 2019, Gopnik authored A Thousand Small Sanities: The Moral Adventure of Liberalism, a nonfiction book published by Basic Books.

In 2023, he wrote The Real Work: On the Mystery of Mastery, published by Liveright.

=== Musical theatre ===
Gopnik began working on musical projects in 2015, as a lyricist and libretto writer. With the composer David Shire he has written book and lyrics for the musical comedy Table, inspired by Gopnik's 2011 book; it was workshopped in 2015 at the Long Wharf Theatre under the direction of Gordon Edelstein, featuring Melissa Errico. For a 2017 revival at the Long Wharf Theatre, Table was retitled The Most Beautiful Room in New York. He wrote the libretto for Nico Muhly's oratorio Sentences, which premiered in London at the Barbican Centre in June 2015.

Other projects include collaborating on a one-woman show for Errico, Sing the Silence, which debuted in November 2015 at The Public Theater in New York, and included new songs co-written with David Shire, Scott Frankel, and Peter Mills. Future projects include a new musical with Scott Frankel.

== Personal life ==
Gopnik lives in New York City with his wife, Martha Rebecca Parker, and two children, Luke and Olivia. Martha's mother is Canadian filmmaker Gudrun Parker. His five siblings include Blake Gopnik, art critic for The Daily Beast, and Alison Gopnik, a developmental psychologist and professor of psychology at the University of California, Berkeley.

== Honors and appearances ==
A guest on Charlie Rose, Gopnik has received three National Magazine Awards for Essay and Criticism, and a George Polk Award for Magazine Reporting. His entry on the culture of the United States is featured in the Encyclopædia Britannica.

Gopnik participates as a member of the jury for the New York International Children's Film Festival.

In 2015 Gopnik wrote and presented Lighting Up New York, a cultural journey through the recent history of New York for Britain's BBC Four and is a regular contributor to the BBC Radio 4 weekly talk series A Point of View.

He taught at the annual Iceland Writers Retreat in Reykjavík in spring 2015. In 2016, Gopnik began a free lecture series at the Lincoln Center's David Rubenstein Atrium, titled The History of the World in 100 Performances.

Throughout the pandemic years, Adam appeared as a regular guest on the Bayard Rustin Center for Social Justice Power Hour with BRCSJ Chief Activist Robt Martin Seda-Schreiber, which was broadcast live every night for over two years, and he is now a regular visitor to this LGBTQIA+ Safe-Space and community activist hub at their physical HQ in Princeton, New Jersey.

Gopnik appears as himself in the 2022 film Tár, interviewing the film's protagonist, Lydia Tár (Cate Blanchett), about her views on conducting at The New Yorker Festival.
