= Ideas (radio show) =

Canadian radio documentary show

- Other names: Ideas in the Afternoon; Ideas in the Summer; The Best Ideas You'll Hear Tonight
- Running time: 54 minutes
- Country of origin: Canada
- Language: English
- Home station: CBC Radio One
- Hosted by: Ken Haslam; Russ Germain; Lister Sinclair; Paul Kennedy; Nahlah Ayed
- Original release: 1965
- Website: www.cbc.ca/radio/ideas
- Podcast: www.cbc.ca/radio/podcasts/documentaries/the-best-of-ideas/

Ideas is a long-running scholarly radio documentary series on CBC Radio One, first broadcast in 1965. Since September 2019 it has been hosted by Nahlah Ayed and is broadcast between 8:05 and 9:00 p.m. weekday evenings; one episode each week is repeated on Monday afternoons under the title Ideas in the Afternoon. The CBC Ideas podcast series initiative began in 2005.

== Background ==
Co-created by Phyllis Webb and William A. Young, the premiere broadcast of the hour-long daily program, The Best Ideas You'll Hear Tonight, aired on CBC Radio on October 25, 1965, and featured a "series on Darwin's theory of evolution by Dr. June Clare, a British biochemist". The Best Ideas was a "series of talks, discussions and commentaries for 'people who just enjoy thinking.'" Two programs, The Learning Stage and University of the Air had merged because of budget cuts to create the Best Ideas first series.

A 1988 Toronto Star article said that the show described itself as a radio program on contemporary thought. The subject matter of the shows varies, but music, philosophy, science, religion, and history were common topics. By 1988, the show had won many plaudits for its quality and depth.

According to a 1989, Calgary Herald article, the series was notable at that time, for soliciting programming proposals from people who are not professional broadcasters, and having the successful applicants write and host their own documentaries (aided in production by CBC staff producers). In the 1990s, the series was sometimes temporarily replaced in the summer season by Ideas in the Summer, a companion series by the same producers which specifically explored cultural and entertainment topics such as music, literature and art.

Many Ideas programs are multi-part, with two, three, four, or more fifty-five-minute programs devoted to a single topic. Transcripts and audio recordings of many programs are made available, and sold directly by the CBC.

In 2013, notable CBC staff producers who have been associated with the program included Bernie Lucht, Geraldine Sherman, Damiano Pietropaolo, Phyllis Webb, and David Cayley. Individual programs are produced at CBC Radio One facilities across Canada. Documentarian William Whitehead also wrote or cowrote a number of shows for Ideas.

A television version for CBC News Network, Ideas on TV, was short-lived. The book Ideas: Brilliant Thinkers Speak Their Minds, edited by Bernie Lucht, commemorated the series' 40th anniversary.

The show broadcasts Canada's annual Massey Lectures, Lafontaine-Baldwin Lecture, and the Munk Debates. Since 2006, they have included the Henry G. Friesen lectures. Audio downloads of many episodes are available from the CBC website, as well as via the CBC Listen application.

On June 24, 2019 it was announced that Nahlah Ayed would be the new host of Ideas, taking over from the retiring Paul Kennedy in September. The CBC's 2019 fall schedule also moved the program an hour earlier from its longtime 9 p.m. slot, and it will now be heard from 8 to 9 p.m. nightly.

== Podcast ==
Ideas podcast, which was, by popular demand, one of the first to be included in the network's large podcasting initiative begun in 2005. (Note: Many episodes are also available for sale on audio CD.)

== Hosts ==
- 1965–mid-1970s: Ken Haslam
- Mid-1970s–1983: Russ Germain
- 1983–1999: Lister Sinclair
- 1999–2019: Paul Kennedy
- 2019–present: Nahlah Ayed
