= Kirk Varnedoe =

American art historian (1946–2003)

- Born: John Kirk Train Varnedoe; January 18, 1946; Savannah, Georgia, U.S.
- Died: August 14, 2003 (aged 57); New York City, U.S.
- Occupation: Art curator
- Spouse: Elyn Zimmerman

John Kirk Train Varnedoe (January 18, 1946 – August 14, 2003) was an American art historian, the chief curator of painting and sculpture at the Museum of Modern Art (MoMA) from 1988 to 2001, Professor of the History of Art at the Institute for Advanced Study in Princeton, New Jersey, and Professor of Fine Arts at the New York University Institute of Fine Arts.

== Biography ==
Varnedoe was born and raised in Savannah, Georgia, and attended Savannah Country Day School. He studied at St. Andrew's School and Williams College, where he was a member of Kappa Alpha Society. At Williams he began studying studio art, but soon switched to art history under the influence of Professor Lane Faison, and received his A.B. in 1967. He also played college football and, after graduating, returned to work as a coaching assistant and to lead art history discussion sections for a year.

In 1972 Varnedoe earned a Ph.D. at Stanford under Rodin scholar Albert Elsen, with whom he collaborated on an exhibition and catalog, The Drawings of Rodin (1971), about the profusion of drawings falsely attributed to Rodin. He married the artist Elyn Zimmerman, taught art history at Stanford for a year, then taught at Columbia University and at New York University Institute of Fine Arts. In 1987 he published a book about the French painter Gustave Caillebotte, which helped to initiate a revival of scholarly and public interest in that little-known Impressionist. A 1982 exhibition Varnedoe curated, "Northern Light: Realism and Symbolism in Scandinavian Painting, 1880-1910" introduced American audiences to yet more unfamiliar artists.

In 1984, the same year that he was awarded a MacArthur Fellowship, he co-curated with William Rubin, the principal curator and future director of the Museum of Modern Art (MoMA), an important and controversial exhibition at MoMA, "Primitivism in Twentieth-Century Art." That relationship with Rubin led to his appointment at MoMA four years later to the position of chief curator of painting and sculpture, a position he held for thirteen years before leaving for Princeton. It was a precarious moment in which to take charge of the most highly regarded collection of modern art in the world; contemporary artists bitterly complained that MoMA had lost touch with the current art scene and those opposed to many of the new developments in the current art scene feared that MoMA would alter its historical allegiance to high Modernism from Matisse to Rothko. "Varnedoe inherits his mantle in difficult times," one commentator observed.

Varnedoe curated or co-curated a number of major exhibitions at MoMA during his tenure, some which were considered highly controversial. A list of the exhibitions he brought to MoMA also indicates the breadth of his interests: "Vienna: 1900" in 1986, "High and Low: Modern Art and Popular Culture" (co-curated with the writer Adam Gopnik) in 1990, retrospectives of the art of Cy Twombly (1995), Jasper Johns (1997), and Jackson Pollock (1999), and "Van Gogh's Postman: The Portraits of Joseph Roulin (2001). He was highly regarded as a public speaker and lectured frequently; among his most notable lecture series were the Slade Lectures at Oxford and the Mellon Lectures at the National Gallery of Art in Washington, D.C.

Varnedoe was elected to the American Academy of Arts and Sciences in 1993. In 2001, he was elected to the American Philosophical Society.

Varnedoe left MoMA in 2001. His departure came, according to his wife and to Adam Gopnik, after a period of difficult relations with the museum's new director, Glenn Lowry. He then became a scholar-in-residence at Princeton's Institute for Advanced Studies until his death two years later.

Kirk Varnedoe died of cancer in 2003 at the age of fifty-seven. Adam Gopnik, one of his graduate school protégés in the mid-1980s, wrote a tribute in The New Yorker in 2004, which was subsequently republished in Reader's Digest.

== Publications ==
- Primitivism in Twentieth-Century Art (1984)
- Vienna 1900 (1986)
- Gustave Caillebotte (1987)
- Northern Light: Nordic Painting at the Turn of the Century (1988)
- High and Low: Modern Art and Popular Culture (1990)
- A Fine Disregard (1990)
- Cy Twombly (1994)
- Jasper Johns (1996)
- Jackson Pollock (1998)
- Pictures of Nothing (2006)

High and Low, written with co-curator Adam Gopnik, was the catalogue that accompanied the MoMA exhibition of that same name. That exhibition was an examination of the overlap between "high culture" (i.e., painting, art works created for display in galleries and museums) and popular culture (i.e., caricature, graffiti, advertising, comic books) that gave rise to the Cubism of Picasso, Kurt Schwitters' collages, Miró's surrealism, the Pop Art of Ed Ruscha and Claes Oldenburg, Jasper Johns' paint brushes and coffee cans, Robert Rauschenberg's Rebus, and late Philip Guston. The exhibition was faulted by some critics for the small number of contemporary works it displayed in proportion to the large number of works by better-known artists whose relation to pop culture had been previously studied. The value of the catalogue, then, was in its thoughtful essays which also discussed, and illustrated, the work of more recent artists whose roots were in pop culture: e.g., Jean-Michel Basquiat, Ashley Bickerton, Roger Brown, Peter Halley, Jenny Holzer, Jeff Koons, Sherrie Levine, Elizabeth Murray, David Salle, Peter Saul, Kenny Scharf, Cindy Sherman, among others.

Varnedoe's last book, Pictures of Nothing, was published posthumously and was based on notes from his A.W. Mellon lectures in the Fine Arts, which he delivered at the National Gallery of Art in Washington, D.C. a few months before his death. His topic was abstract art after Jackson Pollock. His title was taken from a William Hazlitt essay about J. M. W. Turner. In making an impassioned case for post-1950s abstraction, Varnedoe was, in part, offering a response to a much earlier Mellon lecturer, E.H. Gombrich, who in Art and Illusion had extolled the history of representation since the Renaissance and characterized abstract art as a romantic but essentially primitivizing and limiting enterprise. Varnedoe's view, not surprisingly, was quite the opposite. Moreover, he knew that abstraction from Kandinsky to Rothko had achieved an Old master-like acceptance among a broad audience but that large numbers of educated art lovers still harbored doubts about art from Ellsworth Kelly, Robert Morris, and Cy Twombly to Donald Judd, Robert Ryman, and Sol LeWitt, and his lectures made an argument for the depth, variety, and meaningfulness of art after Abstract Expressionism. "What is abstract art good for? Why should we spend our time looking at 'pictures of nothing'?" Varnedoe accepted those as the fundamental questions that had to be addressed. He also acknowledged the gulf between those who revered the School of New York and those who embraced the un-painterly successors to Mark Rothko and Morris Louis, those artists who seemed to represent a repudiation of Abstract Expressionism. His lectures asked: "What have we gained in return for giving up the painterly beauty and sophistication of the art that Minimalism killed off?" Ultimately, he argued that Minimalism represented a profound gain, that it could be taken "both as a legitimate reflection of the way we think individually and as a valuable aspect of a liberal society." He disputed the view that Minimalism was reductive, narrow, or mute: "Minimalism revives and renovates what it seems to kill...it is a radically new kind of art, not a sophisticated variation on traditional modernism."
