= Leap Manifesto =

2015 Canadian political manifesto

- Cover of the Leap Manifesto, designed by artist Julie Flett
- Formation: September 2015
- Founded at: Toronto
- Location: Canada
- Key people: Naomi Klein; Avi Lewis; Martin Lukacs
- Website: leapmanifesto.org

The Leap Manifesto is a Canadian political manifesto that was issued by a coalition of environmentalists, Indigenous, labour, and faith leaders, authors, and artists in September 2015 in the context of that year's Canadian federal election campaign. The document proposes broad changes to Canadian society and economics to respond to climate change through a policy framework that also addresses issues of wealth and income inequality, racism, and colonialism.

The Leap Manifesto launched with the backing of approximately 100 prominent signatories and attracted more than 10,000 signatures the day of its release. Polling indicated that a majority of supporters of most major political parties supported the principles of the manifesto. The manifesto was not significant to parties other than the NDP. It caused significant debate within the New Democratic Party when it was not adopted at their 2016 convention due in part to opposition from Alberta Premier Rachel Notley and her supporters. A compromise saw the document instead referred to riding associations for later study.

Organizers behind the manifesto launched an organization in 2017 to promote its vision, called The Leap. It operated until 2021 and succeeded in being a key convenor of "Canada's Pact for a Green New Deal" in 2019.

== Platform ==
The Leap Manifesto includes 15 points under the slogan of calling "for a Canada based on caring for each other and the planet, moving swiftly to a post-carbon future, upholding Indigenous rights, and pursuing economic justice for all." The points include:

1. Fully implementing the United Nations Declaration on the Rights of Indigenous Peoples
2. A shift to a "100% clean energy economy" by 2050
3. A moratorium on new fossil fuel infrastructure projects
4. Support for community-owned clean energy projects
5. A universal program for energy efficiency and retrofitting, prioritizing low income communities
6. High-speed rail and affordable, nation-wide public transit
7. Re-training and resources for workers in carbon-intensive industries
8. A national infrastructure-renewal program
9. An overhaul of the agricultural industry, prioritizing local production
10. A moratorium on international trade deals that infringe upon democratic rights
11. Immigration status and full legal protection for all workers, including immigrants and refugees
12. Investment in expanding "low-carbon" sectors of the economy, including through the development of a national childcare program
13. A "vigorous debate" on the implementation of a universal basic income
14. An end to austerity and subsidies to the fossil fuel industry, paid for with cuts to military spending and robust progressive, wealth, and corporate taxation
15. An end to corporate funding of political campaigns and examination of voting reform

== History ==
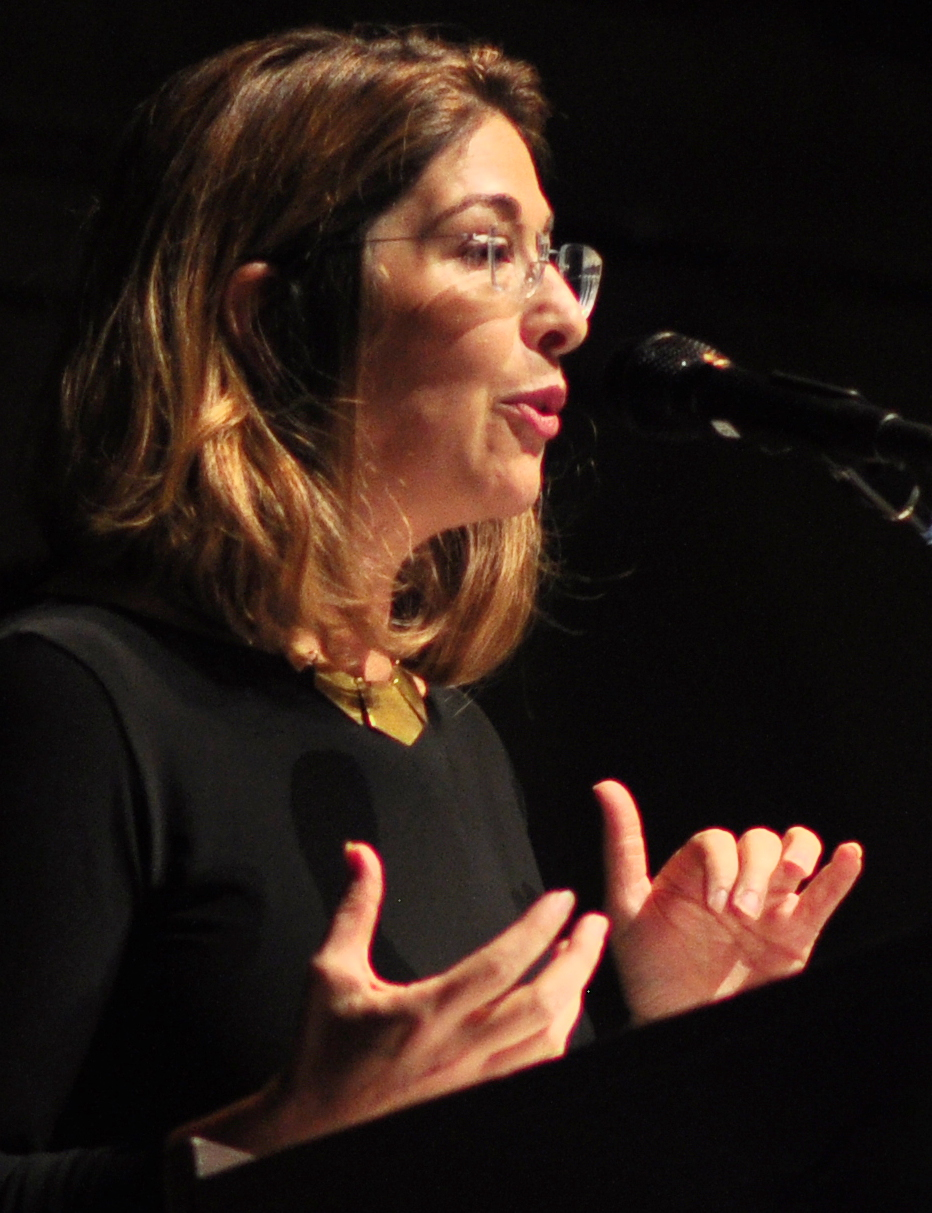
Naomi Klein, seen here in 2015, was a key instigator of the Leap Manifesto

=== 2015 coalition and launch ===
The creation of the manifesto was led by prominent activist and author Naomi Klein, who wrote an initial draft before convening a summit in Toronto in May 2015 with a team of collaborators including Klein's husband, documentary filmmaker Avi Lewis, and journalist Martin Lukacs. The purpose of the summit was to bring together dozens of representatives from various sectors, such as labour unions, environmental organizations, and Indigenous rights advocates, from across the country to read, discuss, and re-shape the draft through a collaborative process. Although Klein, Lewis, and Lukacs are frequently cited as authors of the manifesto, Klein has insisted that it was largely informed by input from the summit, stating that "[t]he finished draft bears no resemblance to the first draft, which I think speaks to the fact that this was a genuinely collective process."

Those involved in the process noted that it was non-partisan and that the work was inspired by the perceived unwillingness of Canadian political parties to engage meaningfully with the climate crisis, particularly in a way that also addressed issues of economic inequality and racism. Lukacs stated that the timing—leading up to the 2015 Canadian election—was purposeful, as "we felt that none of the political parties was offering that kind of vision for the country. A vision that was in line with the urgency of the overlapping crises that we are facing." In her 2017 book No Is Not Enough, Klein wrote of the effort:

The goal was to come up with a vision so concrete and inspiring that voters could, practically speaking, do two things at once. They could go to the polls to vote against what they didn't want (the disastrous government of the day); and they would still have a space, even if it was outside electoral politics, to say yes to a vision we hoped would reflect what many actually do want, by adding their names to our people's platform or otherwise voicing public support.

The manifesto was launched on 15 September during the Toronto International Film Festival, where Lewis' documentary This Changes Everything, based on Klein's book of the same name, was being screened. Initial signatories included environmentalists David Suzuki and Maude Barlow; then-president of the Canadian Union of Public Employees Paul Moist; Indigenous rights advocate Melina Laboucan-Massimo; former Ontario NDP leader Stephen Lewis; actors Donald Sutherland, Rachel McAdams, Elliot Page, and Sarah Polley; writer/director Patricia Rozema; musicians Neil Young, Leonard Cohen, Gord Downie, Sarah Harmer, and Alanis Morissette; and writers William Gibson and Michael Ondaatje, among others. Within a day of its release, organizers reported that more than 10,000 Canadians signed on to the manifesto, and within three weeks the number of signatories had reached 25,000 along with dozens of organizational endorsements.

Despite this public momentum the manifesto was largely ignored by the major Canadian parties during the federal election. Organizers were clear that the manifesto was not focused on any one party, with Lewis stating that they would be happy to talk with any party and that ultimately the party they hoped to influence was whichever one was in power. However, Lukacs has written that there was some hope that the New Democratic Party (NDP), which had its roots in the socialist Co-operative Commonwealth Federation (CCF) and has traditionally been seen as the progressive standard-bearer among major political parties, would take the opportunity to embrace the manifesto, or a discussion of its ideas. In reality, NDP leader Tom Mulcair distanced the party from the manifesto and instead ran a moderate, "pragmatic" campaign that included promises to balance the budget and effectively perpetuate austerity.

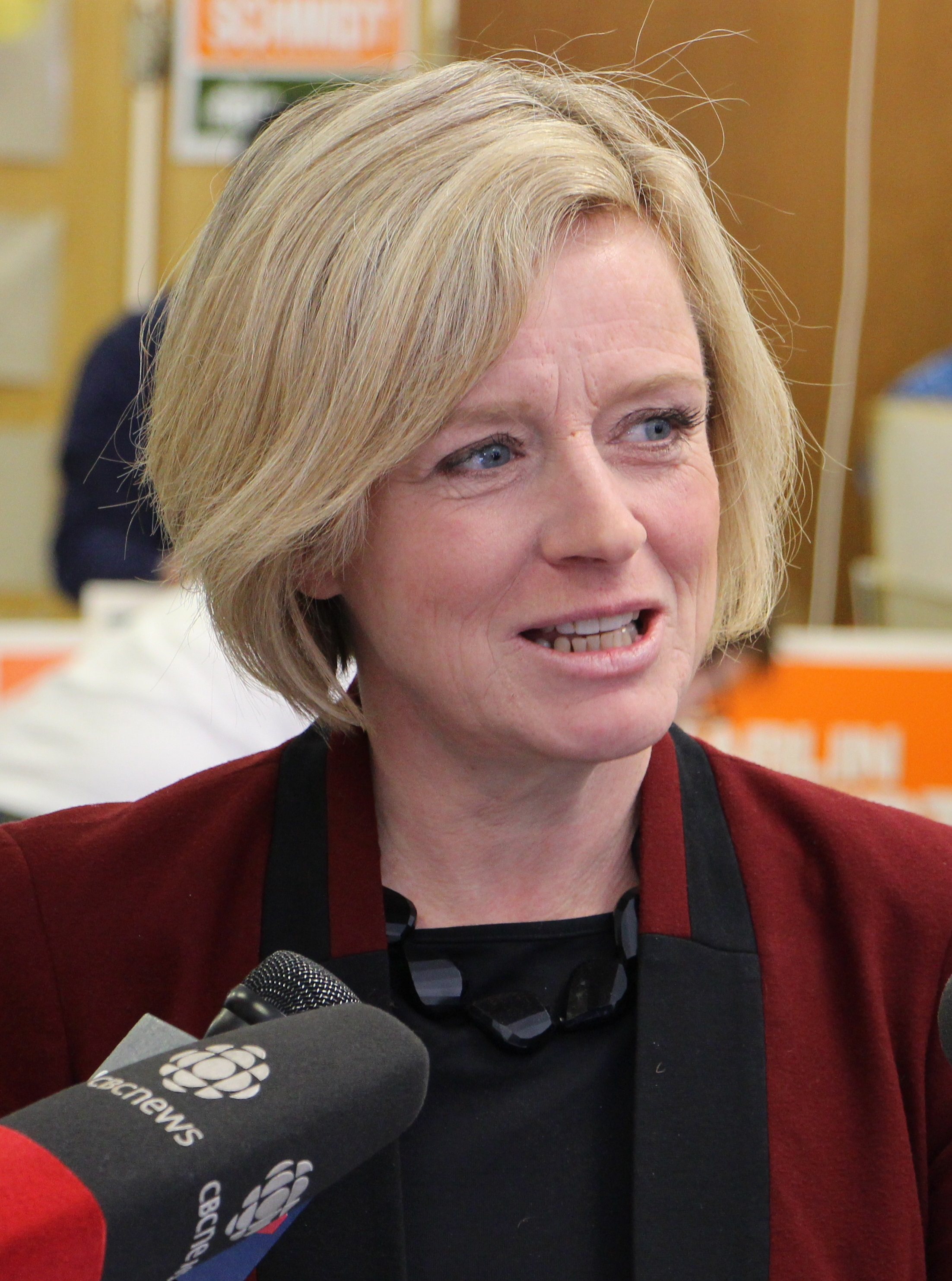
Rachel Notley was a vocal critic of the manifesto as Alberta Premier and provincial NDP leader

=== 2016 New Democratic Party convention ===
While the manifesto was largely ignored during the election, in the aftermath of that campaign it became more tightly linked with the NDP. Early in the election campaign Mulcair and the NDP were leading in the polls; however, they ultimately lost seats and finished third. Many analysts from inside and outside the party blamed the NDP's moderate campaign for these results, and by February more than a dozen NDP riding associations from across the country adopted resolutions for the party to embrace the Leap Manifesto as a means of party renewal. This made the manifesto a significant point of debate at the party's 2016 national convention, which took place in April in Edmonton, Alberta, where the year before a New Democratic government had been elected for the first time. The convention included a resolution that the NDP recognize the manifesto as a "high-level statement of principles that speaks to the aspirations, history and values of the party," and that its specific policy proposals be discussed at the riding level across the country to be adapted to local needs.

Some commentators noted that the NDP, and its CCF predecessor, had a long history of principled debates about manifestos, including the Waffle Movement in the 1970s, which sought to return the NDP to its socialist roots. However, unlike the Waffle, the Leap Manifesto originated from outside the party. Although leading up to the 2016 convention it had significant grassroots momentum within the NDP, the Alberta NDP organized staunchly against, taking issue particularly with its proposal for a moratorium on the development of new fossil fuel infrastructure and a gradual phase-out of fossil fuels from the Canadian economy. Then premier Rachel Notley and president of the Alberta Federation of Labour Gill McGowan were vocal opponents, citing the centrality of the oil industry to Alberta's economy—and the industry's desire for new pipelines—as reasons to reject the manifesto.

The 2016 convention also included a leadership review that would determine the future of Mulcair, and in advance of the convention he softened his stance on the Leap Manifesto. However, in the course of the convention Mulcair failed the leadership review, being demoted to interim party leader, while the Leap resolution passed in a tense vote.

In the aftermath of the convention the NDP put a summer deadline on riding-level discussions of the Leap Manifesto, which some, like Lukacs, argued was tantamount to sabotaging the resolution. The party focused on organizing a leadership race to choose a successor to Mulcair, and no candidate formally championing the manifesto ultimately entered the race; Lewis was encouraged to run by some, but ultimately declined. In 2017 some party members helped launch the Courage Coalition, a grassroots effort aiming in part to promote progressive reform within the NDP, and which stemmed from organizers who helped pass the Leap resolution at the 2016 convention. The group helped organize an effort alongside Leap organizers to revive the discussion of the manifesto within the NDP ahead of its 2018 convention in Ottawa, which also included key organizers from the campaigns of Bernie Sanders in the United States and Jeremy Corbyn in the United Kingdom, but the NDP, under new leader Jagmeet Singh, again distanced itself from the manifesto. Lewis would later be elected leader of the NDP in 2026.

=== The Leap ===
In 2017, the team that drove the development of the manifesto launched an organization called The Leap to push forward implementation of the manifesto's vision. The organization largely focused on organizing outside of party politics, instead supporting the development of local groups dedicated to implementing the principles of the manifesto—one such group in Thunder Bay created a 10-point local manifesto and worked towards organizing a slate of candidates for the municipal election—and working with different partners on a variety of projects. One such project is a collaboration with Friends of Public Services and the Canadian Union of Postal Workers called Delivering Community Power, which seeks to place Canada Post at the center of a national renewable energy transition, including the establishment of postal banking and an electric vehicle fleet.

=== The Green New Deal ===
The Leap was also involved in organizing around the Green New Deal, a proposed economic stimulus program to address the climate crisis alongside inequality, in both the United States and Canada. Organizers with the American Sunrise Movement cited Naomi Klein's work, including on the Leap Manifesto, as a key influence in the genesis of American policy proposals, and the Leap collaborated on the two-part "Message from the Future" campaign designed to popularize the vision of the Green New Deal. The Leap was also instrumental in convening the Pact for a Green New Deal in Canada, a coalition pushing for the development of a Canadian-specific version of the proposal.

In March 2021, The Leap announced that it was winding down its operations, due in large part to funding and operating difficulties in the context of the COVID-19 pandemic. Around the same time, some key members of The Leap team including Lewis, Klein, and Lukacs, helped launch The Breach, a new independent media outlet with a focus on issues central to the Leap Manifesto.

== Reception ==
=== Critical reception ===
After its launch, the Leap Manifesto attracted criticism from many politicians and pundits. Premiers of western provinces were vocally critical from the outset, including Notley, British Columbia premier Christy Clark, and Saskatchewan premier Brad Wall, each of whom considered the manifesto a threat to western extractive industries. Some columnists expanded this to the national level, with Barrie McKenna, for example, calling the manifesto "a prescription for economic ruin." While analysts from the Canadian Centre for Policy Alternatives released a backgrounder alongside the manifesto outlining how its proposals could be funded, some more moderate commentators warned of potential consequences for measures like raising new sources of taxation revenue. Former New Democrat and co-founder of The Waffle, James Laxer, was also critical of the manifesto, arguing that it prioritized the climate crisis, and in particular the shuttering of extractive industries, ahead of the economic concerns of the working class. Lawrence Martin, meanwhile, compared the association of the manifesto with the NDP to the Waffle, and suggested that it was moving the party backwards and into unelectability, "returning to... days when it didn't even pretend to be a serious contender for the prize of governance."

Many commentators were more moderate in their assessments. Aaron Wherry wrote in Maclean's that "many of the [manifesto's] concerns are probably widely held," and that "[m]any of the specifics are basically within the realm of acceptable thought." Linda McQuaig, who had previously run for the NDP, urged national engagement with the manifesto, writing that "reports of the manifesto's scariness have been greatly exaggerated; its call for a transition from fossil fuels to green energy is solidly based in science and widely accepted." Crawford Killian, writing for iPolitics, asked "[w]hen did stating the obvious become 'political suicide'?"

=== Popular reception ===
Polling data about the Leap Manifesto was published in April 2016 and showed support for the document among the Canadian public. Data showed that more than half of Canadians were aware of the manifesto and that there was an even split between those who supported and those who opposed it. A majority of supporters of the NDP, the Liberal Party, and the Green Party were in favour of the manifesto, and it also enjoyed plurality support among supporters of the Bloc Québécois; however, two-thirds of Conservative Party supporters were opposed to the manifesto. An April 2019 poll about the Pact for a Green New Deal, meanwhile, of which The Leap was a key organizer, found that 61% of Canadians were in favour of the proposal.

== See also ==
- Green New Deal
- Green industrial policy
