= Doppelganger: A Trip into the Mirror World =

2023 book by Naomi Klein

- Author: Naomi Klein
- Language: English
- Published: 2023
- Publisher: Farrar, Straus and Giroux
- Publication place: Canada
- Pages: 350 pp.
- ISBN: 978-0-374-61032-6
- Preceded by: How To Change Everything
- Website: naomiklein.org/doppelganger

Doppelganger: A Trip into the Mirror World is a 2023 memoir and political analysis by Canadian author, social activist, and filmmaker Naomi Klein. In it, Klein examines the 2020s climate of political polarization and conspiracy thinking, by contrasting Klein's worldview with that of Naomi Wolf, with whom Klein is often confused.

== History ==
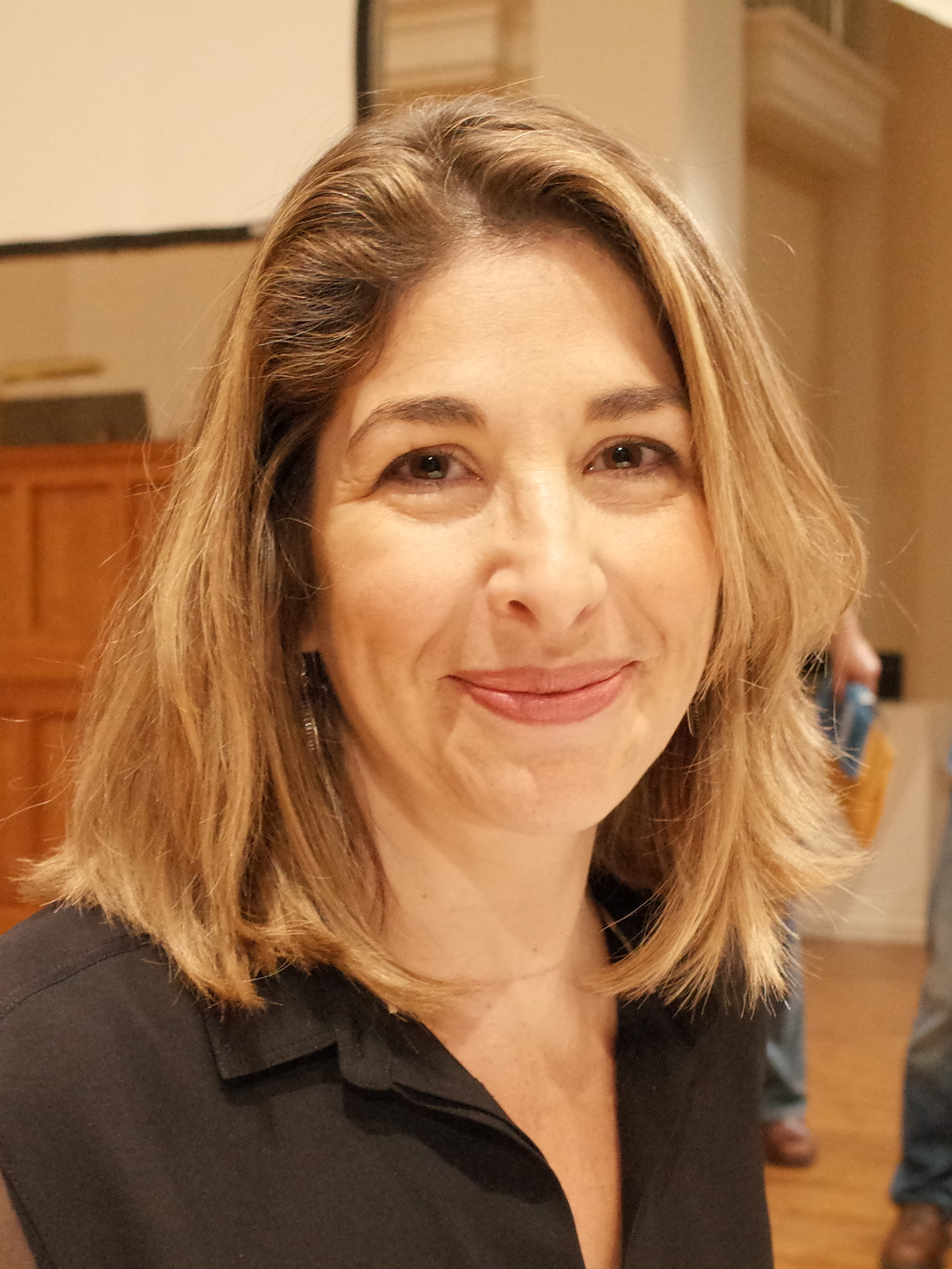
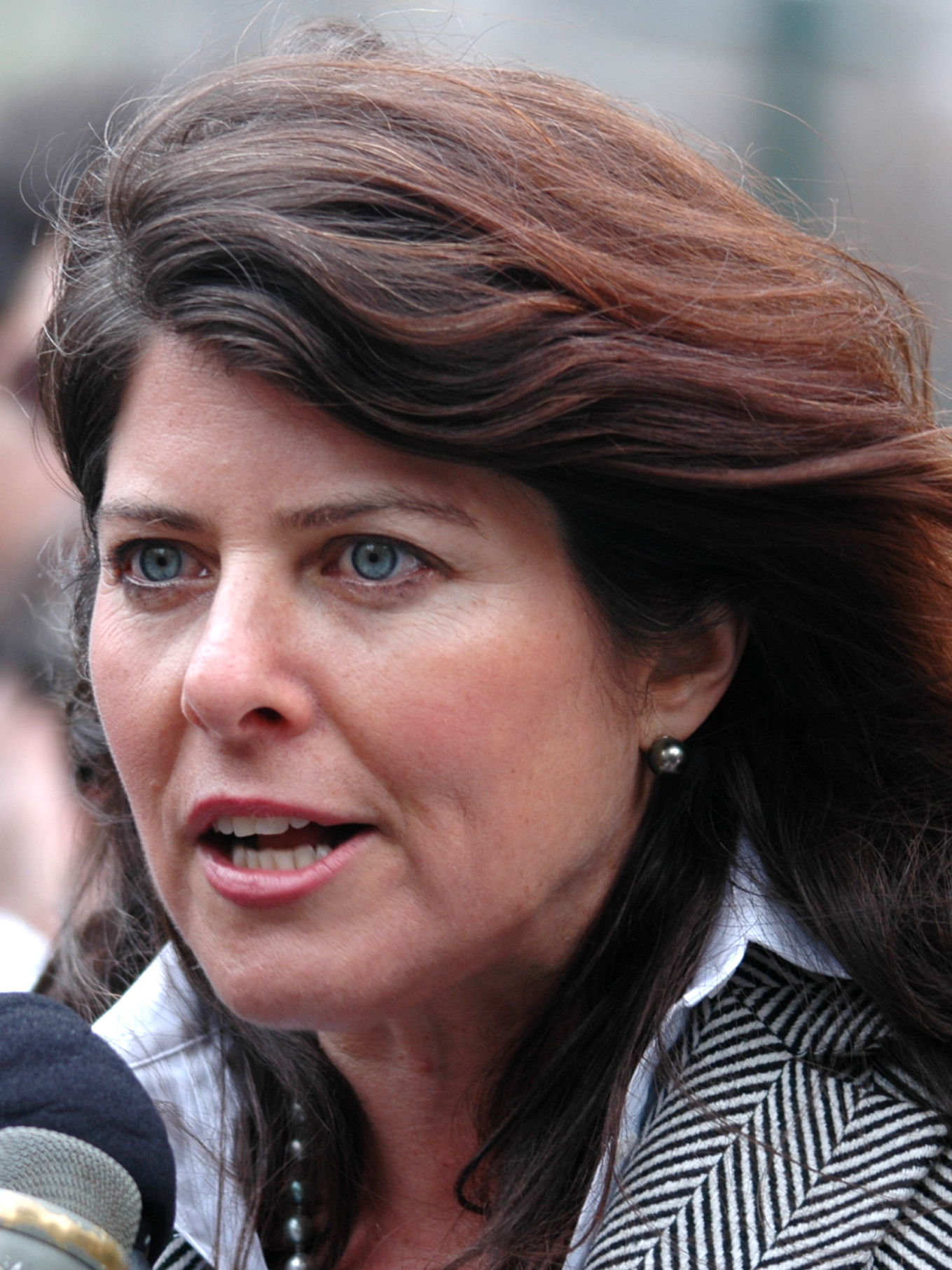
Naomi Klein and Naomi Wolf

=== Development ===
Naomi Klein is a Canadian author known for her generally left-leaning political views and analysis. Klein is often confused with Naomi Wolf, an American author who originally rose to prominence as a notable third-wave feminist, with generally centre-left views; however, by the time of writing, Wolf had become known for her right-wing political opinions, especially those related to the COVID-19 pandemic, the anti-vaccination movement, and other conspiracy theories. The Washington Post's Laura Wagner described the two as both being "White Jewish women" who "published big-idea bestsellers in the '90s" (Wolf wrote The Beauty Myth, Klein No Logo), writing that the two had been casually confused with each other for several years, prior to the publication of Doppelganger. The claim that Wolf and Klein were confused with each other was backed up by other commentators, including those in New York, The New Yorker, and Wired.

In the early stages of writing the book, Klein kept it secret and used the writing process to make sense of the confusion others experienced. Klein intended the book to be different from her previous works, The Shock Doctrine and This Changes Everything, which were structured like a traditional thesis defense. Instead, Klein structured Doppelganger in a more narrative manner. Despite several contact attempts by Klein, Wolf was not involved in the writing of the book.

=== Publication history ===
Doppelganger was published in the United States by Farrar, Straus and Giroux on 12 September 2023. It was published in the United Kingdom by Allen Lane.

== Reception ==
Doppelganger was positively received by critics. Kirkus Reviews described the prose as being "tight and urgent, almost breathless" and praised Klein's blend of cultural criticism and biographical research into Wolf's life. The New Republic published a positive review, describing the story of Klein and Wolf's mistaken identities as being riveting and praising the book for explaining "how so many people have ... broken with conventional left-right political affiliations and shared understandings of reality". The Evening Standard was also positive, saying that Klein wrote with lucidity and noting that the book was much more personal than Klein's earlier work. The Los Angeles Times praised the book for tying its disparate concepts together, describing it as "both timely and timeless". William Davies, writing in The Guardian, praised Klein's analysis of conspiracy theories and the book's attempt to understand and empathize with conspiracy theorists. The New York Times' Michelle Goldberg wrote that no text "better captures the berserk period we're living through", while Katie Roiphe positively described Klein's hopeful tone. Publishers Weekly similarly reviewed the book positively, noting, "Klein’s mesmerizing narrative reflects the unique anxieties and modes of analysis that have come to dominate the online era. Like Klein’s previous books, it’s a definitive signpost of the times."

The Irish Independent praised the book for its personal moments but criticized its breadth, writing that "the scope is so wide-ranging that, at times, the reader can wonder how everything is linked." The Washington Post criticized the book's argument that leftists ought to reconsider their approaches to conflict, language, and identity politics, writing that "it's the only argument in the book not bolstered by specifics". New York magazine was also somewhat critical, with Jacob Bacharach writing that the book did not substantially engage with the doppelgänger concept, instead using it as a jumping-off point to a range of different topics. According to Bacharach, the result was that too many concepts seemed to fit into Klein's framework, without sufficient analysis to justify their inclusion.

Doppelganger debuted at number eight on the New York Times Best Seller list for hardcover nonfiction works. On June 13, 2024, the book won the inaugural Women's Prize for Non-Fiction.
