= On Fire (book) =

2019 book by Naomi Klein

On Fire: The (Burning) Case for a Green New Deal
- First edition (US)
- Author: Naomi Klein
- Published: 17 September 2019
- Publisher: Simon & Schuster (US); Allen Lane (UK)
- Pages: 320
- ISBN: 9781982129910
- Preceded by: The Battle for Paradise
- Followed by: How to change everything

On Fire: The (Burning) Case for a Green New Deal is Naomi Klein's seventh book, published in September 2019 by Simon & Schuster. On Fire is a collection of essays focusing on climate change and the urgent actions needed to preserve the planet.

== Synopsis ==
Klein relays her meeting with Greta Thunberg in the opening essay in which she discusses how young people are speaking out for climate awareness and change. Throughout the book, Klein discusses her support for the Green New Deal and in the final essay she notes of the 2020 U.S. election that, "The stakes of the election are almost unbearably high. It’s why I wrote the book and decided to put it out now and why I’ll be doing whatever I can to help push people toward supporting a candidate with the most ambitious Green New Deal platform—so that they win the primaries and then the general."

Klein emphasizes the moral and practical imperatives for the Green New Deal, rather than only concentrating on the brass tacks of policy and funding.

== Reception ==
In his review for The New York Times, Jeff Goodell says that Klein's book "makes a strong case for tackling the climate crisis as not just an urgent undertaking, but an inspiring one." Despite what Goodell sees as a "hodgepodge and repetitive" structure built from previously published works, which themselves Goodel identifies as "dated," with only "perfunctory...updates" attached.

Writing for The New York Review of Books, Eric Klinenberg describes On Fire as the "coda" to Klein's previous book, This Changes Everything, adding the policy suggestions missing from her previous book. Though Klinenberg notes that "On Fire is nowhere near as ambitious as Klein's other books," he adds that "Klein is a talented polemicist, and On Fire is a powerful manifesto." Despite what Klinenberg sees as the book's lack of deep reporting, the fact that "it's repetitive and unfairly dismissive of some genuinely difficult scientific and political questions," and lack of "coherent strategy for overcoming partisan opposition," Klinenberg concludes his review by noting that it may be the book necessary for the historical moment of 2020: "If ever there were an opportunity to advocate for new social and economic models, this is it."

Steve Leigh's review in Against the Current offers a critique from his perspective as a socialist. Leigh credits Klein as being "an excellent writer [who] as usual makes a solid case for radical transformation of the energy system," to which he adds his criticism: "Yet this is exactly what’s frustrating about Klein’s writing on this topic. Her prescriptions don’t meet her analysis." In Leigh's view, "To end the threat of global ecocide, we need to eliminate private and bureaucratic ownership, not just regulate it," which leads him to his conclusion that the book "is a useful analysis of the problem, even if its prescriptions fall short."
