= Political positions of Pierre Poilievre =

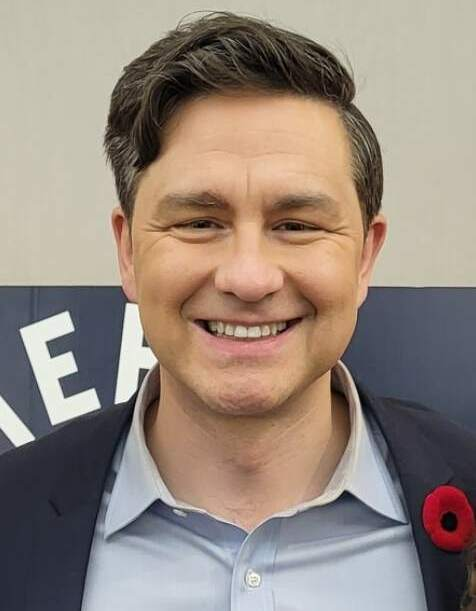
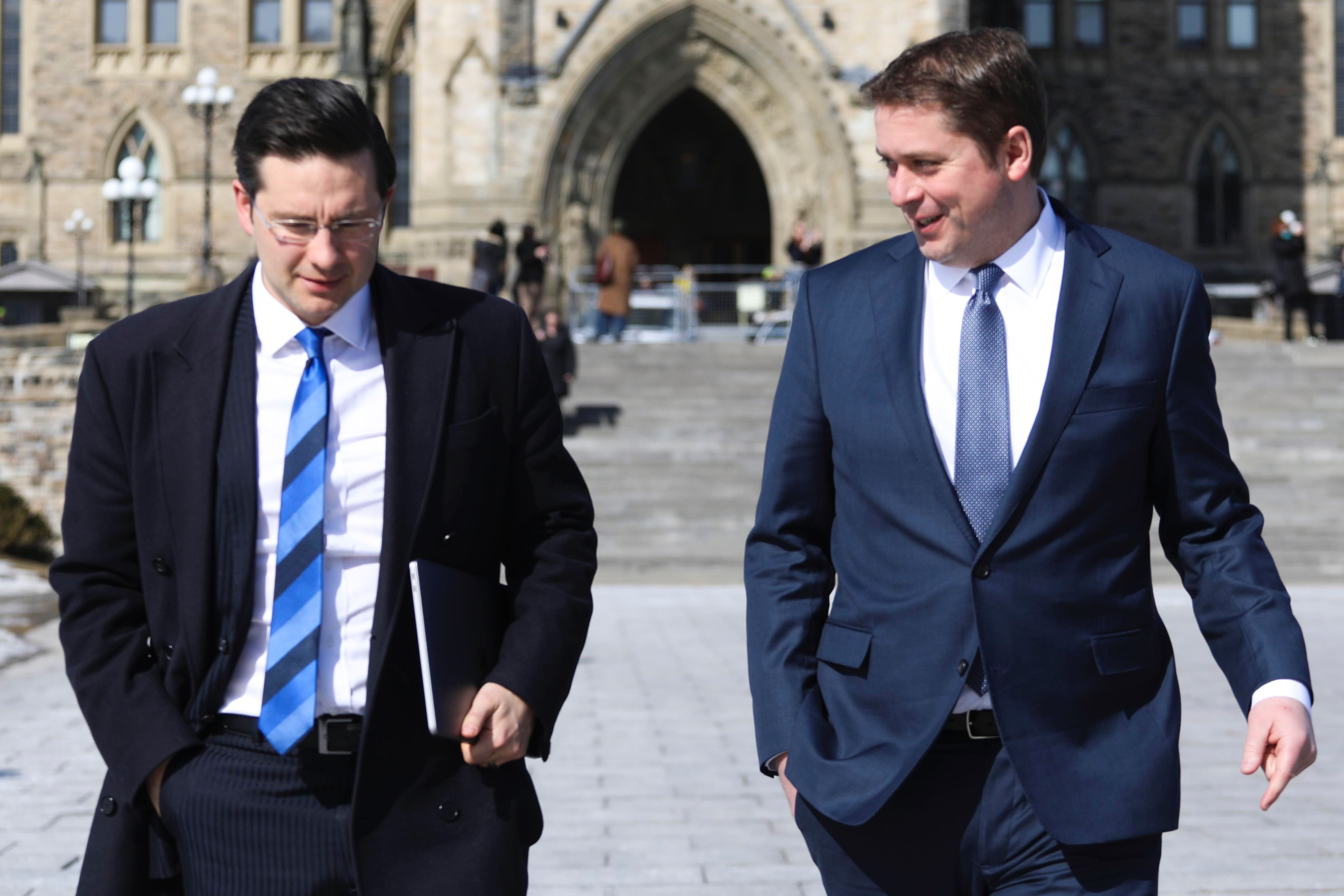
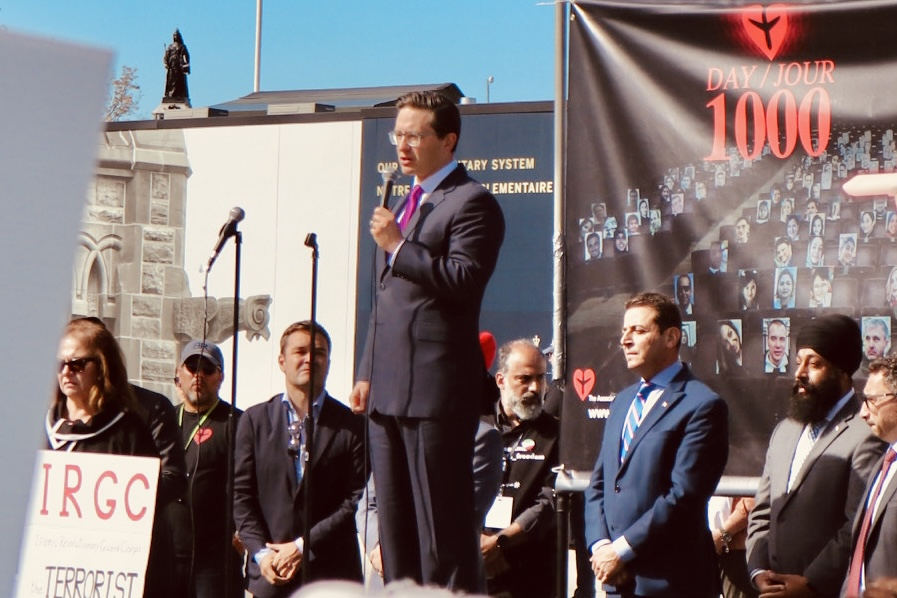
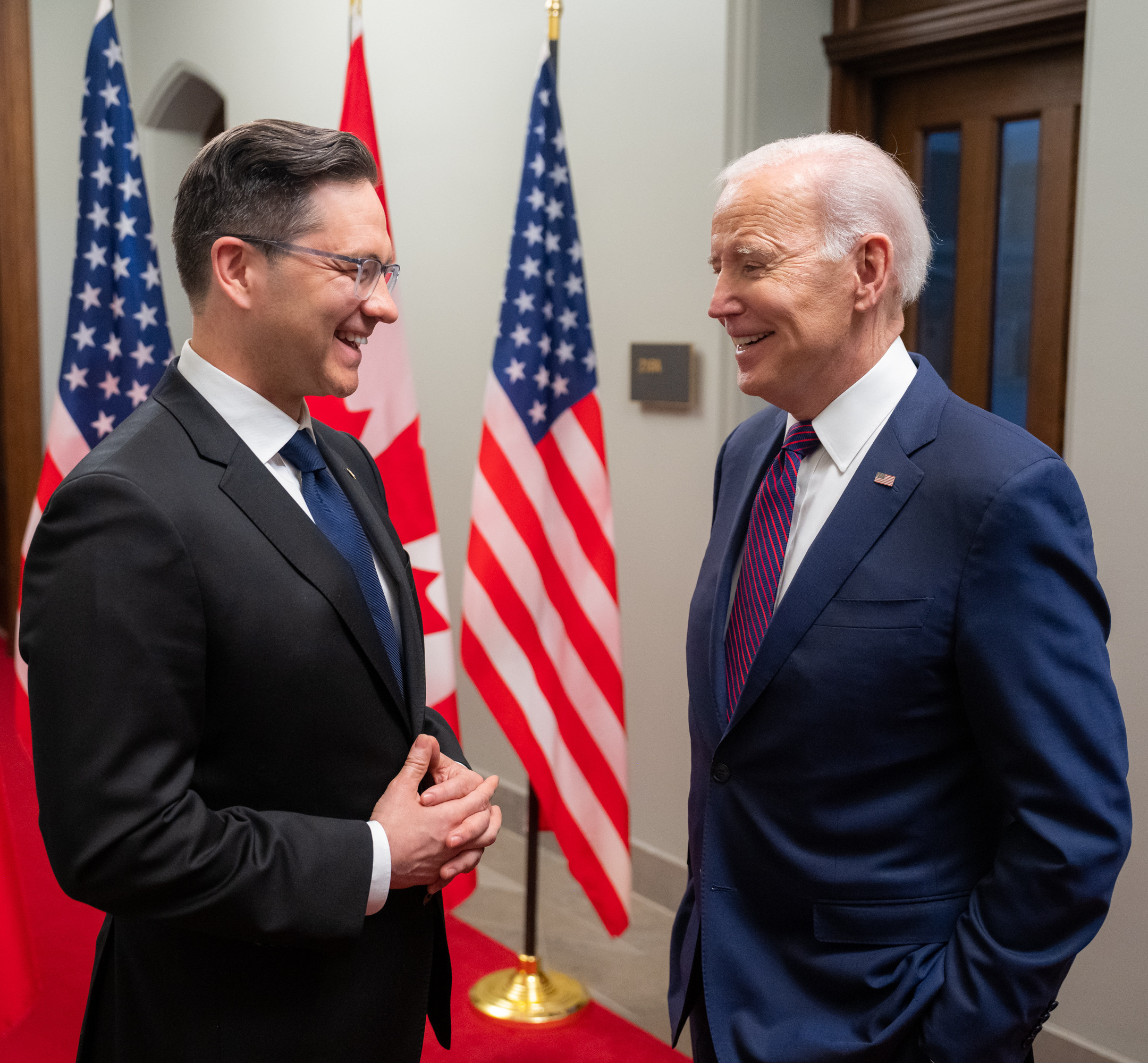
From left to right, top to bottom:
- Poilievre in 2023 as leader of the Conservative Party
- Poilievre with then-party leader Andrew Scheer in 2018
- Poilievre at a protest marking 1,000 days since the IRGC shot down UIA Flight 752
- Poilievre with U.S. President Joe Biden

Pierre Poilievre is the leader of the Conservative Party of Canada and leader of the Opposition. He has often been described as a true-blue conservative, with libertarian and populist political stances. Poilievre's political ideology is also occasionally referred to as Poilievreism (also spelt Poilievre-ism).

== Themes ==
According to The Hill Times, Poilievreism "is increasingly all about opposing the three main 'isms' of the 21st century: globalism, wokism, and elitism."

=== Right-wing populism ===
Poilievre has been described as populist by several journalists. According to the Canadian Centre for Policy Alternatives, "much of Poilievre’s commentary to date is centred around trash-talking Canada and blaming everything on Justin Trudeau and the federal Liberals. While that makes for good populist politics, it’s far from clear what he actually stands for and what Canadians can expect should he become the next Prime Minister."

=== Anti-globalism ===
In 2022, Poilievre stated that a government led by him would ban Cabinet ministers from participating in the World Economic Forum, stating that the forum "is against the interests of our people". He also barred his ministers from attending any World Economic Forum conferences and claimed that then Prime Minister Justin Trudeau was working for the World Economic Forum rather than working for Canada.

=== Militarism ===
Poilievre stated that a government under his leadership would cut back "foreign aid to terrorist dictators and multinational bureaucracies" use the money to "rebuild the Canadian Armed Forces." He also pledged to "change the culture of the Canadian Armed Forces" from a "woke culture to a warrior one." Poilievre also said that he is "prepared to increase the military's resources." During a speech in Iqaluit in February 2025, Poilievre said that a government under his leadership would built a permanent military base in Nunavut and pay for it by "dramatically cutting Canada’s foreign aid budget."

== Comparisons to American politicians and politics ==
=== Comparisons to Trumpism ===
Zack Beauchamp of Vox Media referred to Poilievre's political rhetoric as "Canada’s polite Trumpism".
