= Naomi Klein =

Canadian author and activist (born 1970)

- Klein in 2026
- Born: May 8, 1970 (age 56); Montreal, Quebec, Canada
- Education: University of Toronto (attended)
- Occupations: Author, activist, professor, filmmaker
- Spouse: Avi Lewis (m. 1998)
- Children: 1
- Parent: Bonnie Sherr Klein (mother)
- Relatives: Lewis family
- Writing career
- Period: 1999–present
- Genre: Nonfiction
- Subjects: Anti-war, anti-globalization, organized labour, feminism, anti-Zionism
- Notable works: This Changes Everything, No Logo, The Shock Doctrine, Doppelganger: A Trip into the Mirror World
- Political party: New Democratic
- Website: naomiklein.org

Naomi Klein (born May 8, 1970) is a Canadian author, social activist, and filmmaker known for her political analyses, support of ecofeminism and organized labour, and criticism of corporate globalization, fascism, and capitalism.

Klein first became known internationally for her alter-globalization book No Logo (1999). The Take (2004), a documentary film about Argentine workers' self-managed factories, written by her and directed by her husband Avi Lewis, further increased her profile. The Shock Doctrine (2007), a critical analysis of the history of neoliberal economics, solidified her standing as a prominent activist on the international stage and was adapted into a six-minute companion film by Alfonso and Jonás Cuarón, as well as a feature-length documentary by Michael Winterbottom. Klein's This Changes Everything: Capitalism vs. the Climate (2014) was a New York Times nonfiction bestseller and the winner of the Hilary Weston Writers' Trust Prize for Nonfiction.

In 2016, Klein was awarded the Sydney Peace Prize for her activism on climate justice. Klein frequently appears on global and national lists of top influential thinkers, including the 2014 Thought Leaders ranking compiled by the Gottlieb Duttweiler Institute, Prospect magazine's world thinkers 2014 poll, and Maclean's 2014 Power List. She was formerly a member of the board of directors of the climate activist group 350.org. In 2021, Klein took up the UBC Professorship in Climate Justice, joining the University of British Columbia's Department of Geography. She has been the co-director of the Centre for Climate Justice since it was launched in 2021.

== Family ==
Naomi Klein was born in Montreal, Quebec, into a Jewish family with a history of peace activism. Her parents were self-described hippies who emigrated from the United States in 1967 as war resisters to the Vietnam War. Her mother, documentary filmmaker Bonnie Sherr Klein, is best known for her anti-pornography film Not a Love Story. Her father, Michael Klein (1938-2026), was a physician and a member of Physicians for Social Responsibility who was awarded in the Order of Canada in 2016. Her brother, Seth Klein, is an author and the former director of the British Columbia office of the Canadian Centre for Policy Alternatives; he is the domestic partner of politician Christine Boyle.

Before World War II, her paternal grandparents were members of the Communist Party USA (CPUSA) but began to turn against the Soviet Union after the Molotov–Ribbentrop Pact in 1939. In 1942, her grandfather, an animator at Disney, was fired after the 1941 strike, and had to switch to working in a shipyard instead. By 1956, they had abandoned Communism. Klein's father grew up surrounded by ideas of social justice and racial equality but found it "difficult and frightening to be the child of Communists", or a "red diaper baby".

Klein's husband, Avi Lewis, was born into a political and journalistic family. His grandfather, David Lewis, was an architect and leader of the federal New Democratic Party (NDP), while his father, Stephen Lewis, was a leader of the Ontario New Democratic Party. Avi's mother is Michelle Landsberg, journalist, feminist, and campaigner. Avi Lewis is a filmmaker and journalist who serves as leader of the federal NDP. The couple have one son, Toma.

== Early life and education ==
Klein spent much of her teenage years in shopping malls, obsessed with designer labels. As a child and teenager, she found it "very oppressive to have a very public feminist mother", and she rejected politics, instead embracing "full-on consumerism".

She has attributed her change in worldview to two catalysts. One was when she was 17 and preparing for the University of Toronto, her mother had a stroke and became severely disabled. Naomi, her father, and her brother took care of Bonnie through the period in hospital and at home, making educational sacrifices to do so. That year off prevented her "from being such a brat". The next year, after she had begun her studies at the University of Toronto, the second catalyst occurred: the 1989 École Polytechnique massacre of female engineering students, which proved to be a wake-up call to feminism.

Klein's writing career began with contributions to The Varsity, a student newspaper, where she served as editor-in-chief. After her third year at the University of Toronto, she dropped out of university to take a job at The Globe and Mail, followed by an editorship at This Magazine. In 1995, she returned to the University of Toronto with the intention of finishing her degree; however, she left to pursue an internship in journalism before acquiring the final credits required to complete her degree.

== Works ==
=== No Logo ===
In 1999, Klein published the book No Logo, which for many became a manifesto of the anti-globalization movement. In it, she attacks brand-oriented consumer culture and the operations of large corporations. She also accuses several such corporations of unethically exploiting workers in the world's poorest countries in pursuit of greater profits. In this book, Klein criticized Nike so severely that Nike published a point-by-point response. No Logo became an international bestseller, selling over one million copies in over 28 languages.

=== Fences and Windows ===
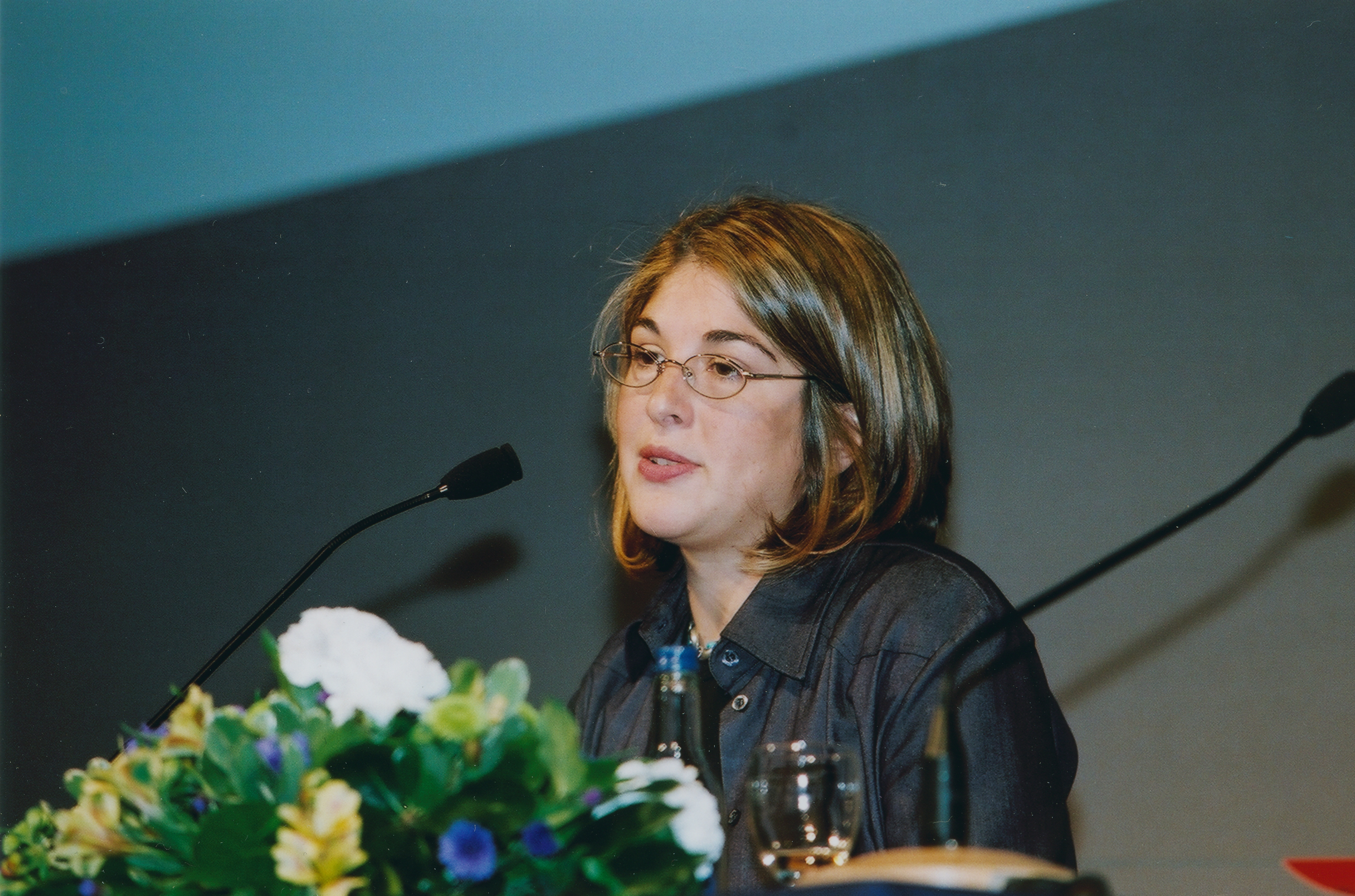
Klein speaking in 2002

Klein's Fences and Windows (2002) is a collection of her articles and speeches written on behalf of the anti-globalization movement (all proceeds from the book go to benefit activist organizations through The Fences and Windows Fund).

=== The Take ===
The Take (2004), a documentary film collaboration by Klein and Lewis, concerns factory workers in Argentina who took over a closed plant and resumed production, operating as a collective. The first African screening was in the Kennedy Road shack settlement in the South African city of Durban, where the Abahlali baseMjondolo movement began. An article in Z Communications criticized The Take for its portrayal of the Argentine general and politician Juan Domingo Perón arguing that he was falsely portrayed as a social democrat.

=== The Shock Doctrine ===
Klein's third book, The Shock Doctrine: The Rise of Disaster Capitalism, was published in 2007. The book argues that the free market policies of Nobel Laureate Milton Friedman and the Chicago school of economics have risen to prominence in countries such as Chile under Pinochet, Poland, and Russia under Yeltsin. The book also argues that policy initiatives (for instance, the privatization of Iraq's economy under the Coalition Provisional Authority) were rushed through while the citizens of these countries were in shock from disasters, upheavals, or invasion. The book became an international and New York Times bestseller and was translated into 28 languages.

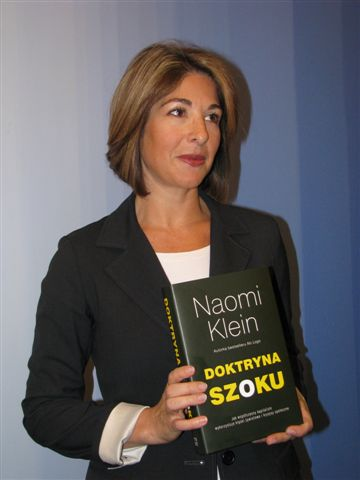
Klein in 2008 with the Polish edition of Shock Doctrine

Central to the book's thesis is the contention that those who wish to implement unpopular free market policies now routinely do so by taking advantage of certain features of the aftermath of major disasters, be they economic, political, military or natural. The suggestion is that when a society experiences a major 'shock' there is a widespread desire for a rapid and decisive response to correct the situation; this desire for bold and immediate action provides an opportunity for unscrupulous actors to implement policies which go far beyond a legitimate response to disaster. The book suggests that when the rush to act means the specifics of a response will go unscrutinized, that is the moment when unpopular and unrelated policies will intentionally be rushed into effect. The book appears to claim that these shocks are in some cases intentionally encouraged or even manufactured. Klein identifies the "shock doctrine", elaborating on Joseph Schumpeter, as the latest in capitalism's phases of "creative destruction".

The Shock Doctrine was adapted into a short film of the same name, released onto YouTube. The original is no longer available on the site; however, a duplicate was published in 2008. The film was directed by Jonás Cuarón, produced and co-written by his father Alfonso Cuarón. The original video was viewed over one million times. The director Michael Winterbottom, alongside Mat Whitecross, also produced a documentary on the book which premiered in 2009.

The publication of The Shock Doctrine increased Klein's prominence, with The New Yorker judging her "the most visible and influential figure on the American left—what Howard Zinn and Noam Chomsky were thirty years ago." On February 24, 2009, the book was awarded the inaugural Warwick Prize for Writing from the University of Warwick in England. The prize carried a cash award of £50,000.

=== This Changes Everything ===
Klein's fourth book, This Changes Everything: Capitalism vs. the Climate, was published in September 2014. The book puts forth the argument that the hegemony of neoliberal market fundamentalism is blocking any serious reforms to halt climate change and protect the environment. Questioned about Klein's claim that capitalism and controlling climate change were incompatible, Benoit Blarel, manager of the Environment and Natural Resources global practice at the World Bank, said that the write-off of fossil fuels necessary to control climate change "will have a huge impact all over" and that the World Bank was "starting work on this". The book won the 2014 Hilary Weston Writers' Trust Prize for Nonfiction, and was a shortlisted nominee for the 2015 Shaughnessy Cohen Prize for Political Writing.

=== No Is Not Enough ===
Klein's fifth book, No Is Not Enough: Resisting Trump's Shock Politics and Winning the World We Need, was published in 2017. In a feature on Klein in Geographical magazine, Chris Fitch described her book as arguing for "radical change, and for bold, ambitious policies, to provide a credible alternative to the world vision of the Trump White House, and avert the worst effects of climate change." Klein takes particular issue in No Is Not Enough with the concept of philanthrocapitalism: "the idea that wealth attaches itself to wisdom and the capacity to solve problems on a global scale". She attributes Trump's political rise in part to a misplaced public faith in oligarchs. She writes:

Trump's assertion that he knows how to fix America because he's rich is nothing more than the uncouth, vulgar echo of a dangerous idea we have been hearing for years; that Bill Gates can fix Africa. Or that Richard Branson and Michael Bloomberg can solve climate change.

=== The Battle for Paradise ===
The Battle for Paradise: Puerto Rico Takes on the Disaster Capitalists was released in June 2018 as a paperback and e-book. It covers what San Juan Mayor Carmen Yulín Cruz refers to as "a fight for our lives. Hurricanes Irma and María unmasked the colonialism we face in Puerto Rico, and the inequality it fosters, creating a fierce humanitarian crisis." In the book, Klein applies principles outlined in The Shock Doctrine to describe the management of Puerto Rico in a post-Maria context. She criticizes the inadequate recovery efforts of the Puerto Rican government in the aftermath of the storm. She singles out officeholders like Gov. Ricardo Rosselló, who prioritized foreign investment interests while the island's residents were left to fend for themselves or seek refuge on the U.S. mainland. She notes that less than one year after the hurricane, Rosselló "told a business audience in New York that Maria had created a 'blank canvas'", implying that Puerto Rico would cater to "disaster capitalists" who aimed to profit off the hurricane's devastating effects.

=== On Fire ===
In April 2019, Simon & Schuster announced they would be publishing Klein's seventh book, On Fire: The (Burning) Case for a Green New Deal, which was published on September 17, 2019. On Fire is a collection of essays focusing on climate change and the urgent actions needed to preserve the world. Klein relates her meeting with Greta Thunberg in the opening essay in which she discusses the entrance of young people into those speaking out for climate awareness and change. She supports the Green New Deal throughout the book and in the final essay she discusses the 2020 U.S. election stating: "The stakes of the election are almost unbearably high. It's why I wrote the book and decided to put it out now and why I'll be doing whatever I can to help push people toward supporting a candidate with the most ambitious Green New Deal platform—so that they win the primaries and then the general."

=== Doppelganger ===
Released in September 2023, Doppelganger: A Trip into the Mirror World is a memoir and social critique that contrasts Klein's worldview with that of Naomi Wolf, a writer who is often mistaken for Klein and vice versa. In her introduction, Klein explains how she has been mistaken for the "other Naomi", with whom she "has been chronically confused for over a decade... I have been confused with Other Naomi for so long and so frequently that I have often felt that she was following me". For this reason, she started to follow what she calls Wolf's "new alliances with some of the most dangerous men on the planet", and wrote the book with the intention of using her doppelganger experience "as a guide into and through what I have come to understand as our doppelganger culture".

Klein suggests that the Western world has fractured along political and ideological lines to such an extent that each side feels the other exists in a "mirror world". The book received primarily positive reviews and debuted at number 8 on The New York Times hardcover nonfiction weekly best seller list. In 2024, Doppelganger won the inaugural Women's Prize for Non-Fiction.

=== End Times Fascism ===
Naomi Klein has critiqued the environmental impact of AI, expanding her work on what she believes is the global rise of fascism, and releasing it as the book End Times Fascism, published in September 2026. The book, co-written with Astra Taylor, expands her long‑running analysis of right-wing authoritarianism and how it intersects with elements of fatalistic end times brought about by threats like artificial intelligence, supernatural forces, political crises, or nuclear war.

== Views ==
=== Iraq War criticism ===
Klein has written about the Iraq War. In "Baghdad Year Zero" (Harper's Magazine, September 2004), Klein argues that, contrary to popular belief, the George W. Bush administration did have a clear plan for post-invasion Iraq: to build a completely unconstrained free market economy. She describes plans to allow foreigners to extract wealth from Iraq and the methods used to achieve those goals. Her "Baghdad Year Zero" was one of the inspirations for the 2008 film War, Inc. Klein's "Bring Najaf to New York" (The Nation, August 2004) argued that Muqtada Al Sadr's Mahdi Army "represents the overwhelmingly mainstream sentiment in Iraq" and that, if he were elected, "Sadr would try to turn Iraq into a theocracy like Iran", although his immediate demands were for "direct elections and an end to foreign occupation".

=== Venezuela ===
Klein signed a 2004 petition titled "We would vote for Hugo Chávez". In 2007, she described Venezuela under the Chávez government as a country where "citizens had renewed their faith in the power of democracy to improve their lives", and described Venezuela as a place sheltered by Chávez's policies from the economic shocks produced by capitalism. Rather, according to Klein, Chávez protected his country from financial crisis by building "a zone of relative economic calm and predictability." The Shock Doctrine was described as consistent with Klein's prior thinking about globalization, and in that book she portrays Chávez's policies as an example of public control of some sectors of the economy as protecting poor people from harm caused by globalization.

According to reviewer Todd Gitlin, who described the overall argument of Klein's book The Shock Doctrine (2007) as "more right than wrong", Klein is "a romantic" with unrealistic expectations [that] the Chávez government would produce a bright future in which worker-controlled co-operatives would run the economy. In 2017, Mark Milke lambasted Klein as a "useful idiot" who overlooked the authoritarian media control and many human rights abuses of the Chávez regime, and journalist James Kirchick criticized Klein, among other prominent Chávez boosters, who were "conspicuous [by their] silence in the face of the Venezuelan calamity" as the nation's economy and infrastructure collapsed during the crisis in Venezuela.

=== Criticism of Israel ===
In 2008, Klein was the keynote speaker at the first national conference of the Alliance of Concerned Jewish Canadians (now Independent Jewish Voices). In January 2009, during the Gaza War, Klein supported the Boycott, Divestment and Sanctions (BDS) campaign against Israel, arguing that "the best strategy to end the increasingly bloody occupation is for Israel to become the target of the kind of global movement that put an end to apartheid in South Africa."

In 2009, on the occasion of the publication of the Hebrew translation of her book The Shock Doctrine, Klein visited Israel, the West Bank, and the Gaza Strip, combining the promotion of her book and the BDS campaign. In an interview with the Israeli newspaper Haaretz, she emphasized that it was important "not to boycott Israelis but rather to boycott the normalization of Israel and the conflict." In a speech in Ramallah on June 27, she apologized to Palestinians for not joining the BDS campaign earlier. Her remarks, particularly that "[some Jews] even think we get one get-away-with-genocide-free card", were characterized by Noam Schimmel, an op-ed columnist for The Jerusalem Post, as "violent" and "unethical", and as the "most perverse of aspersions on Jews, an age-old stereotype of Jews as intrinsically evil and malicious."

Klein was a spokesperson for the protest against the spotlight on Tel Aviv at the 2009 Toronto International Film Festival, which Klein said was a very selective and misleading portrait of Israel. She has also served on the advisory board of the anti-Zionist organization Jewish Voice for Peace. In 2023, in the context of the Gaza war, she wrote:

For Zionist believers (I'm not one of them), Jew-hatred is the central rationale for why Israel must exist as a nuclear-armed fortress. Within this worldview, antisemitism is cast as a primordial force that cannot be weakened or confronted. The world will always turn away from us in our hour of need, Zionism tells us, just as it did during the Holocaust, which is why force alone is presented as the only conceivable response to any and all threats. The Israeli state's current murderous leveling of Gaza is the latest, unspeakably horrific manifestation of this ideology, and there will be more in the coming days.

At a "Seder in the Streets" event in 2024, held near Senator Chuck Schumer's residence, Klein spoke about the contemporary meaning of Passover and its relation to the war. Using the Exodus story of Israelites worshipping the golden calf as an idol, she drew parallels to what she called "the false idol of Zionism." She said: "It is a false idol that takes our most profound biblical stories of justice and emancipation from slavery, the story of Passover itself, and turns them into brutalist weapons of colonial land theft, roadmaps for ethnic cleansing and genocide."

=== Environmentalism ===
Indeed the three policy pillars of the neoliberal age—privatization of the public sphere, deregulation of the corporate sector, and the lowering of income and corporate taxes, paid for with cuts to public spending—are each incompatible with many of the actions we must take to bring our emissions to safe levels. And together these pillars form an ideological wall that has blocked a serious response to climate change for decades.

— Naomi Klein

By 2009, Klein's attention had turned to environmentalism, with particular focus on climate change, the subject of her book This Changes Everything (2014). According to her website in 2016, the book and its accompanying film (released in 2015) would be about "how the climate crisis can spur economic and political transformation." She served on the board of directors of the non-profit group 350.org from 2011, through the fiscal year ending September 2018, and took part in their "Do the Math" tour in 2013, encouraging a divestment movement.

In an interview by Graeme Greene in New Internationalist, Klein rejected criticism that This Changes Everything politicized the climate issue and that the issue should be apolitical, asserting that such criticism reflected "how blind so many within the mainstream climate discussion are to the fact that they themselves are fully immersed within the confines of neoliberalism; ... It's a fantasy that you could fundamentally shift the building blocks of your economy without engaging with politics."

She encouraged the Occupy movement to join forces with the environmental movement, saying the financial crisis and the climate crisis are similarly rooted in unrestrained corporate greed. She gave a speech at Occupy Wall Street where she described the world as "upside down", where people act as if "there is no end to what is actually finite—fossil fuels and the atmospheric space to absorb their emissions", and as if there are "limits to what is actually bountiful—the financial resources to build the kind of society we need."

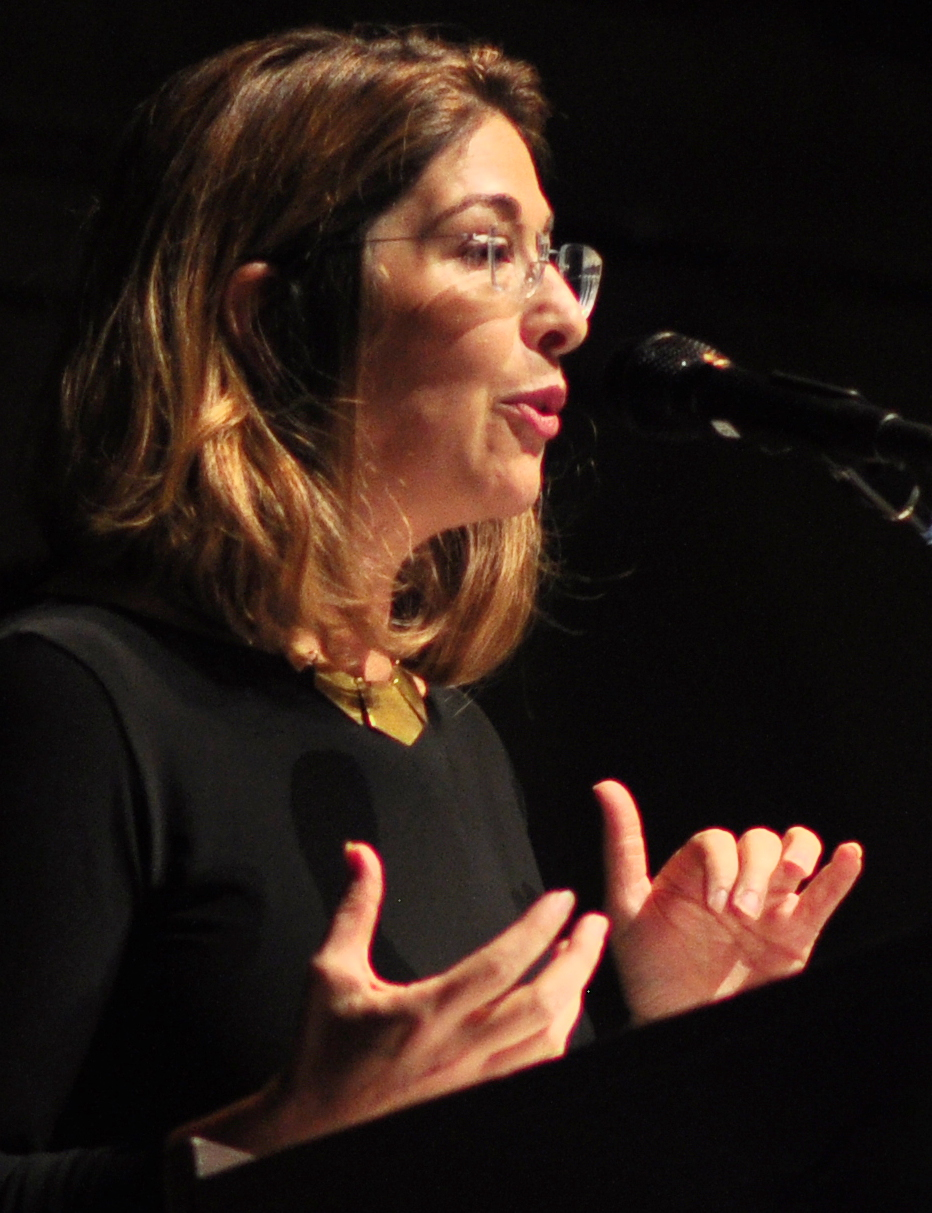
Klein in 2015

She has been a particularly vocal critic of the Athabasca oil sands development in Alberta, describing it in a TED Talk as a form of "terrestrial skinning." On September 2, 2011, she attended the demonstration against the Keystone Pipeline outside the White House and was arrested. Klein celebrated Obama's decision to postpone a decision on the Keystone pipeline until 2013 pending an environmental review as a victory for the environmental movement.

She attended the 2009 United Nations Climate Change Conference in Copenhagen. She put the blame for the failure of Copenhagen on President Barack Obama, and described her own country, Canada, as a "climate criminal". She presented the Angry Mermaid Award (a satirical award designed to recognize the corporations who have best sabotaged the climate negotiations) to Monsanto. Writing in the wake of Hurricane Sandy, she warned that the climate crisis constitutes a massive opportunity for disaster capitalists and corporations seeking to profit from crisis. But equally, the climate crisis "can be a historic moment to usher in the next great wave of progressive change", or a "People's Shock".

In 2016, following the election of Donald Trump as the 45th president of the United States, Klein called for an international campaign to impose economic sanctions on the United States if his administration refused to abide by the terms of the Paris Agreement. In October 2022, Klein published an article on The Intercept that addressed the 2022 United Nations Climate Change Conference and the repression of the Egyptian government; the conference took place in Egypt, a country widely seen as repressive and autocratic. She goes on to state "Sisi's Egypt is making a big show of solar panels and biodegradable straws ... but in reality, the regime imprisons activists and bans research. The climate movement should not play along", calling it greenwashing. In an interview with Democracy Now!, she says "what is not welcome would be pointing out this enormous lucrative network of deals that the military itself is engaged in that are linked to fossil fuels, that are linked to destroying remaining green space in cities like Cairo". Klein also stressed the release of prominent political prisoner and activist Alaa Abd El-Fattah, and wrote a foreword to You Have Not Yet Been Defeated (2021), his collected writings translated by an anonymous collective.

== Other activities ==
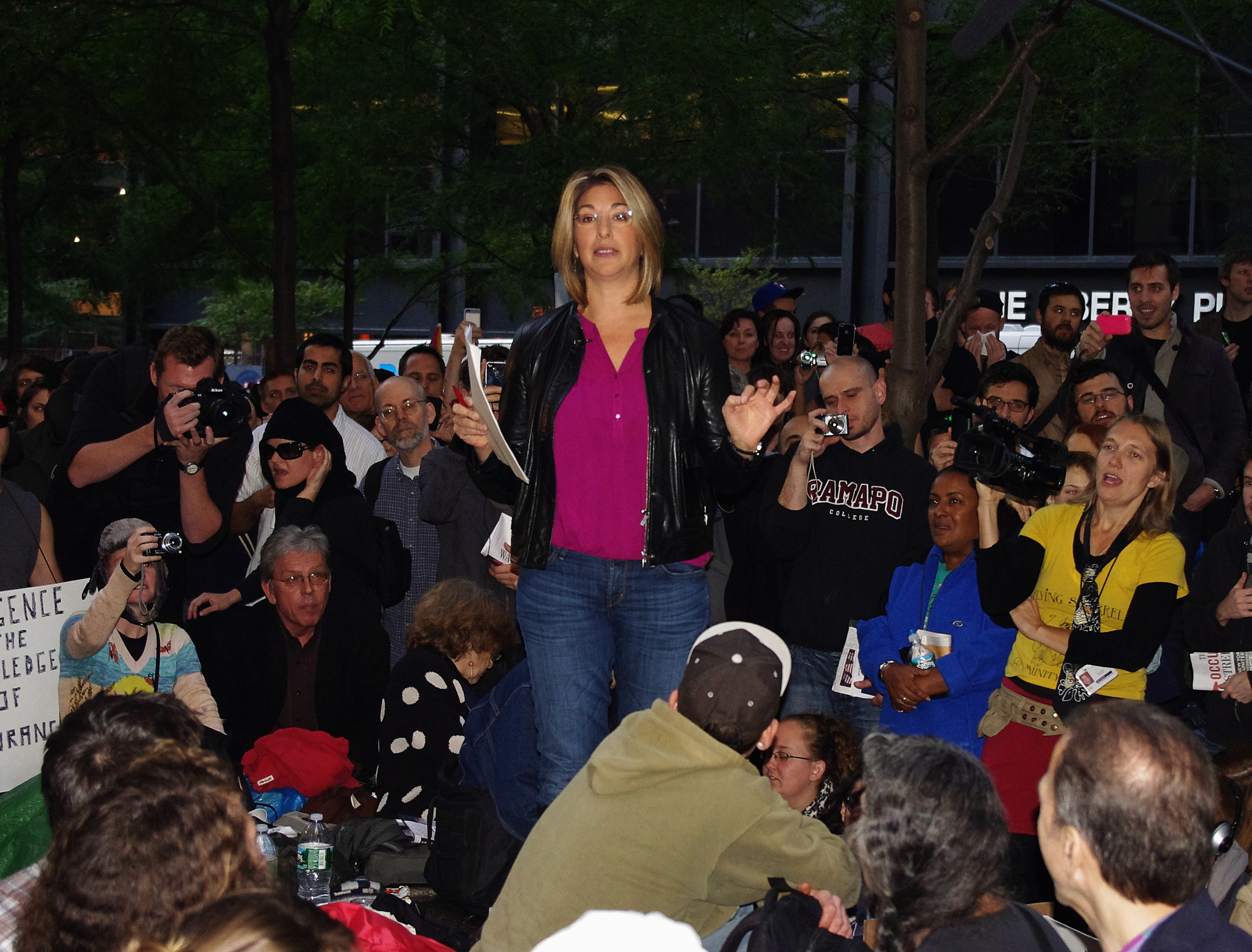
Klein speaking at Occupy Wall Street in 2011

Klein contributes to The Nation, In These Times, The Globe and Mail, This Magazine, Harper's Magazine, and The Guardian, and is a senior contributor for The Intercept. She is a former Miliband Fellow and lectured at the London School of Economics on the anti-globalization movement. Her appointment as the inaugural Gloria Steinem Endowed Chair in Media, Culture and Feminist Studies at Rutgers University–New Brunswick began in October 2018 and ran for 3 years.

Klein ranked 11th in an internet poll of the top global intellectuals of 2005, a list of the world's top 100 public intellectuals compiled by the Prospect magazine in conjunction with Foreign Policy magazine. On Google Scholar which tracks academic articles, Klein has an overall h-index of 53 and her publications have been cited in the scholarly literature over 49,000 times as of May 2023. She was involved in 2010 G-20 Toronto summit protests, condemning police force and brutality. She spoke to a rally seeking the release of protesters in front of police headquarters on June 28, 2010.

In 2011, she visited Occupy Wall Street and gave a speech declaring the protest movement "the most important thing in the world". On November 10, 2011, she participated in a panel discussion about the future of Occupy Wall Street with four other panelists, including Michael Moore, William Greider, and Rinku Sen, in which she stressed the crucial nature of the evolving movement. Klein also made an appearance in the British radio show Desert Island Discs on BBC Radio 4 in 2017.

Klein was a key instigator of the Leap Manifesto, a political manifesto issued in the context of the 2015 Canadian federal election focused on addressing the climate crisis through restructuring the Canadian economy and dealing with issues of income and wealth inequality, racism, and colonialism. The manifesto has been noted as an influence in the development of the Green New Deal and eventually led to the establishment of The Leap, an organization that works to promote the realization of the principles behind the original manifesto.

In 2019, along with other public figures, Klein signed a letter supporting Labour Party leader Jeremy Corbyn describing him as "a beacon of hope in the struggle against emergent far-right nationalism, xenophobia and racism in much of the democratic world" and endorsed him in the 2019 UK general election. In 2025, Klein actively participated in New York canvassing for Democratic mayoral candidate Zohran Mamdani. She also supported her husband Avi Lewis's campaign for leader of the New Democratic Party in 2026.

== Honours and awards ==
- 2009: Warwick Prize for Writing, for The Shock Doctrine
- 2011: Honorary doctorate, Saint Thomas University
- 2011: Time magazine's list of Top 100 Non-Fiction books published since 1923, No Logo
- 2014: Hilary Weston Writers' Trust Prize for Nonfiction for This Changes Everything
- 2014: The Observer 'Book of the Year', This Changes Everything
- 2014: The Guardian Readers' 10 best books of 2014, for This Changes Everything
- 2016: Sydney Peace Prize
- 2017: No Logo – Included in The Guardian's list of the Top 100 Non Fiction books of all-time
- 2019: Honorary doctorate, University of Amsterdam
- 2021: The Neil Postman Award for Career Achievement in Public Intellectual Activity, Media Ecology Association
- 2023: The Guardian's Best Ideas Books of 2023, Doppelganger
- 2024: Women's Prize for Non-Fiction for Doppelganger

== List of works ==
=== Books ===
- No Logo: Taking Aim at the Brand Bullies. Knopf Canada and Picador. 1999. ISBN 9780312421434.
- Fences and Windows: Dispatches from the Front Lines of the Globalization Debate. St. Martin's. 2002. ISBN 9780312307998.
- The Shock Doctrine: The Rise of Disaster Capitalism. Knopf Canada. 2007. ISBN 9780676978001.
- This Changes Everything: Capitalism vs. the Climate. Simon & Schuster. 2014. ISBN 9781451697384.
- No Is Not Enough: Resisting Trump's Shock Politics and Winning the World We Need. Haymarket Books. 2017. ISBN 9781608468904.
- The Battle for Paradise: Puerto Rico Takes on the Disaster Capitalists. Haymarket Books. 2018. ISBN 9781608463572.
- On Fire: The (Burning) Case for a Green New Deal. Simon & Schuster. 2019. ISBN 9781982129910.
- How to Change Everything: The Young Human's Guide to Protecting the Planet and Each Other. Penguin Books. 2021. ISBN 9780241530023.
- Doppelganger: A Trip into the Mirror World. Farrar, Straus and Giroux. 2023. ISBN 9780374610326.
- with Taylor, Astra (2026). End Times Fascism and the Fight for the Living World. Knopf Canada. ISBN 9781039059375.

=== Filmography ===
- The Corporation (2003) (interviewee)
- The Take (2004) (writer)
- The Shock Doctrine (2009) (writer)
- Catastroika (2012) (appearance)
- This Changes Everything (2015)
