= Kate McInturff =

Canadian policy analyst and activist (1968–2018)

Kate Elaine McInturff (22 August 1968 – 27 July 2018) was a Canadian policy analyst, scholar, and gender-equality activist.

McInturff was born in Seattle, Washington, United States. She received a PhD from the University of British Columbia in postcolonial studies. McInturff started her career as an academic, teaching at the American University of Cairo, McMaster University, and the University of Ottawa. She then moved into the nonprofit sector, working at Peacebuild, the Feminist Alliance for International Action and Amnesty International. For several years, she wrote the gender issues chapter of the Canadian Centre for Policy Alternatives Alternative Federal Budget and in 2013 she formally joined the staff where her work included directing the "Making Women Count" initiative and compiling a significant annual report on gender equality across Canada. She also served on the United Nations Advisory Group on Inequalities and the Coordinating Committee of Social Watch.
