= Avi Lewis =

Canadian politician and filmmaker (born 1967)

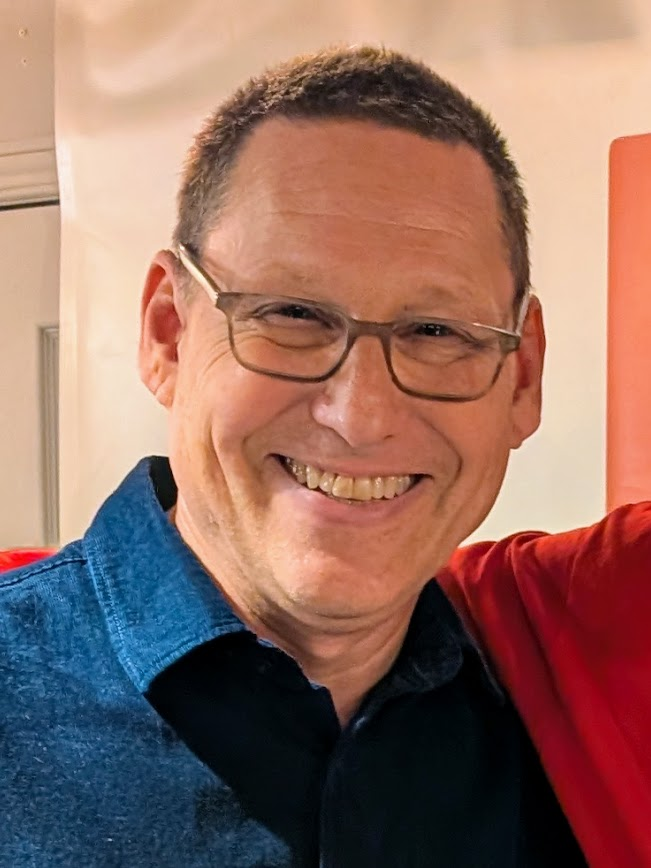
- Lewis in 2025

Leader of the New Democratic Party
- Incumbent
- Assumed office March 29, 2026
- Preceded by: Don Davies (interim)

Personal details
- Born: Avram David Lewis; May 1967 (age 59) Toronto, Ontario, Canada
- Party: New Democratic
- Spouse: Naomi Klein (m. 1998)
- Children: 1
- Parents: Stephen Lewis (father); Michele Landsberg (mother)
- Relatives: Lewis family
- Education: University College, Toronto (BA)
- Occupation: Journalist; broadcaster; filmmaker; academic; activist
- Website: lewisforleader.ca

Avram David "Avi" Lewis (born May 1967) is a Canadian politician and filmmaker who has served as leader of the New Democratic Party (NDP) since 2026.

Raised in a political family, Lewis began his career in broadcasting, hosting several programs for Citytv, CBC News and Al Jazeera English including The NewMusic, CounterSpin, On the Map with Avi Lewis, The Big Picture with Avi Lewis, and Fault Lines. With his wife Naomi Klein, Lewis directed the documentaries The Take and This Changes Everything. Lewis was also an associate professor at the University of British Columbia and a lecturer at Rutgers University.

Lewis first became involved in politics with the Leap Manifesto, published along with Naomi Klein and several other activists in 2015. He later ran as an NDP candidate in the 2021 and 2025 federal elections, placing third each time. He was elected the party's leader in March 2026 on the first ballot, with 56 percent of the vote.

== Early life and education ==
Avram David Lewis was born in May 1967 in Toronto, Ontario, where he was raised. Lewis is the great-grandson of Mojżesz Łoś (Moishe Losz), better known in Canada as Morris Lewis, an outspoken Polish-Jewish member of the Jewish Bund, who left Europe amid shifting borders and was threatened by the Bolsheviks for his political activity. Moishe arrived in Montreal in 1921, with his wife Rose and three children. Avi's grandfather David Lewis was the leader of the NDP from 1971 to 1975, and his father Stephen Lewis was the leader of the Ontario NDP from 1970 to 1978 and served as the Canadian ambassador to the United Nations from 1984 to 1988. Stephen died on March 31, 2026, two days following Avi's election as federal NDP leader. His mother is journalist and author Michele Landsberg. Lewis has two siblings: casting director Jenny Lewis and human rights activist Ilana Landsberg-Lewis.

Lewis attended Jarvis Collegiate Institute and Upper Canada College, graduating with a Bachelor of Arts from University College at the University of Toronto in 1988.

== Career ==
=== Early broadcasting career ===
Between 1996 and 1998, Lewis was the host of The NewMusic, a music magazine show on MuchMusic and Citytv. He also served as MuchMusic's political specialist, doing extensive special events coverage for the channel, covering the 1993 Canadian federal election and the 1995 Quebec referendum. Lewis won a Gemini Award for Best Event Coverage. He also worked for Bell Media's CP24.

=== Canadian Broadcasting Corporation ===
From 1998 to 2001, he hosted CBC Newsworld's current affairs discussion show CounterSpin, where he presided over 500 debates. He was later the host of Counterspin Sunday. Lewis began hosting The Big Picture with Avi Lewis in the autumn of 2006 and On the Map in 2007. In the latter program, Lewis conducted interviews with Ayaan Hirsi Ali and John Bolton, among others. He was a panellist on Canada Reads, which aired from March 2 to 6, 2009, where he presented, and successfully defended, the winning book, Lawrence Hill's The Book of Negroes.

In June 2007, CBC Newsworld debuted On the Map with Avi Lewis, a daily (Monday to Thursday) half-hour of international news commentary. On the Map's half-hour time slot was replaced with a half-hour summary of the daily hour-long show Politics by Don Newman. During the same time period on CBC Television, The Hour, hosted by George Stroumboulopoulos aired.

=== Al Jazeera ===
Inside USA was first telecast on Al Jazeera English on February 8, 2008, with the episode "Politics of Race". Al Jazeera describes Inside USA as "an in-depth look at the real issues at stake in the US presidential election." "Politics Of Race", released on February 22, 2008, focused on the situation in New Orleans and the disenfranchisement of Black voters. "Native Americans", released on March 1, 2008, focused on Lakota Sioux separatism and the social and economic issues surrounding the Lakota Sioux, Navajo and the Shoshone peoples. The last few minutes were devoted to the role online videos play in US elections, including a clip from "Yes We Can".

Following the presidential election, Lewis became a co-host of Fault Lines in 2009, a program known for investigative storytelling examining the United States and its role in the world.

=== Documentary films ===
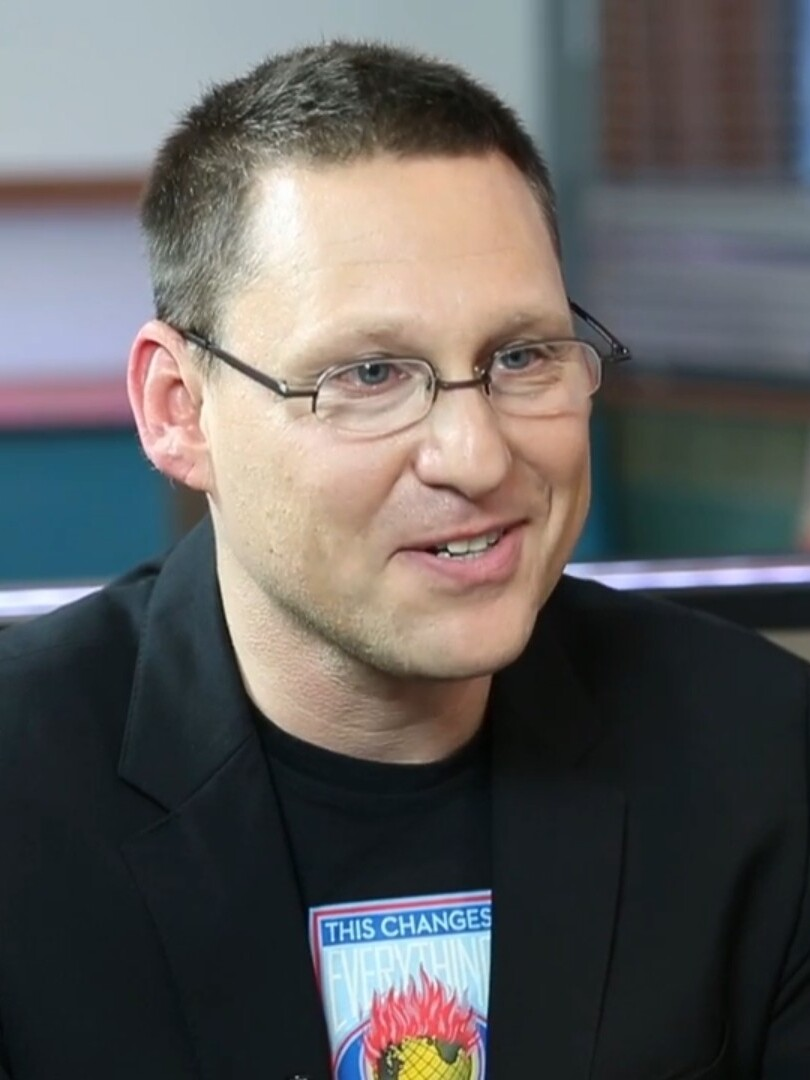
Lewis in 2016

In 2004, Lewis and his wife Naomi Klein collaborated on The Take, a documentary that detailed the "recovered factory" movement in Argentina. The Take, winner of the International Jury Prize at the American Film Institute festival, was nominated for four Gemini Awards. Collaboration between Lewis, Klein, and Brendan Martin led to the creation of The Working World/La Bas foundation, a non-profit microcredit aimed at cooperatives active in the United States and Argentina.

Lewis directed the 2015 feature-length documentary This Changes Everything, which finished second in the audience voting, for the documentary category, at the 2015 Toronto International Film Festival.

With his organization, The Leap, Lewis co-wrote a short film titled A Message from the Future with Alexandria Ocasio-Cortez in 2019. It was nominated for Outstanding News Analysis: Editorial and Opinion at the 41st News and Documentary Emmy Awards. A sequel, titled Message from the Future II: The Years of Repair was also co-written by Lewis and was released in 2020 by The Intercept.

=== Academics and journalism ===
He was a journalism and media studies lecturer at Rutgers University in New Jersey and an associate professor in the geography department of the University of British Columbia, where he taught courses on social and political change, communication and documentary filmmaking.

== Political beginnings ==
An active member of the NDP, he was speculated as a potential candidate in the 2017 leadership election, but declined to run. Lewis supports shifting the NDP further to the left, endorsing and campaigning for several progressive candidates in internal NDP elections, such as Anjali Appadurai in the 2022 BC NDP leadership election.

In May 2021, Lewis was nominated as the NDP's candidate for West Vancouver—Sunshine Coast—Sea to Sky Country, British Columbia for the 2021 Canadian federal election, which was subsequently called for September 20, 2021. Lewis' run for federal parliament was endorsed by environmentalist David Suzuki, and actress Jane Fonda. He received 25.63% of the vote, the NDP's best result in the riding, but still came in third behind incumbent Liberal Patrick Weiler and Conservative John Weston.

In September 2024, Lewis was acclaimed as the NDP candidate in Vancouver Centre for the 2025 Canadian federal election. He placed third, behind incumbent Liberal Hedy Fry and Conservative Elaine Allan, as the NDP lost the majority of its seats in the House of Commons and official party status.

=== Leap Manifesto ===
In September 2015, Lewis, Naomi Klein, and others launched the Leap Manifesto, which proposed broad changes to Canadian society and economics in order to respond to climate change through a policy framework that also addressed issues of wealth and income inequality, racism, and colonialism in hopes of influencing the policy debate during the 2015 Canadian federal election campaign. The oil and gas provisions within the manifesto were criticized by Rachel Notley's Alberta NDP government. In 2016, Lewis spearheaded a motion at the NDP's federal convention in Edmonton, Alberta, which would have had the party endorse the manifesto. In the end, the motion was amended to refer the manifesto to constituency associations for debate. Lewis and other manifesto signatories launched an organization to promote the manifesto's vision in 2017, called The Leap, which operated until 2021 and was a key convenor of Canada's Pact for a Green New Deal in 2019.

== Leader of the New Democratic Party (2026–present) ==
=== 2026 leadership campaign ===
Lewis was a candidate in the 2026 NDP leadership election. He launched his campaign on September 19, 2025, being the first candidate approved to run. He held his campaign launch in Toronto and used the slogan "for the many, not the money" throughout the campaign. His policies include establishing a Canadian Green New Deal, supporting Palestinian rights, creating public options for groceries, telecommunications, postal banking, and pharmaceuticals, building a million public housing units, implementing a moratorium on AI data centre construction, a wealth tax on the top 1%, and expanding healthcare access by incorporating dental, vision, and mental health services into the public system.

By the end of December 2025, his campaign claimed to have raised nearly $783,000. By the end of January 2026, it was reported that his campaign had raised over $1,000,000. During the campaign period, Lewis was endorsed by several current and former MPs including Libby Davies, Leah Gazan, Niki Ashton and Svend Robinson, and provincial politicians including Peter Tabuns, Amir Khadir, Joel Harden, Cheri DiNovo and Flor Marcelino. Before her floor-crossing, Nunavut MP Lori Idlout had appeared at a Lewis campaign event in Ottawa. At the end of the campaign, Lewis had raised $1.23 million from 10,410 donors.

=== Tenure ===
On March 29, 2026, at the NDP convention in Winnipeg, he was elected party leader on the first ballot with 39,734 votes (56.02%). Lewis delivered his victory speech alongside caucus members, leadership rivals, volunteers, and Manitoba Premier Wab Kinew. Afterwards, Alberta NDP leader Naheed Nenshi distanced himself and his party from the federal NDP, criticising its oil and gas policy under Lewis. In addition, Saskatchewan NDP leader Carla Beck released an open letter, refusing to meet with Lewis until he publicly reversed his "ideological and unrealistic" opposition to new fossil fuel developments. Other provincial NDP leaders including BC NDP leader David Eby and Ontario NDP leader Marit Stiles, congratulated Lewis on his victory. He is the first NDP leader to have never previously held elected office.

On April 10, 2026, Lewis shuffled the New Democratic Party's shadow cabinet, which included naming Don Davies as the party's parliamentary leader, and appointing Heather McPherson as the party's House leader. In late April, the party's deputy leader and lone Quebec MP, Alexandre Boulerice, announced his intention to join provincial politics and resign from the House of Commons to run provincially for the Quebec sovereigntist party Québec solidaire. Lewis has declined to seek immediate election to the House of Commons after becoming NDP leader, choosing not to become a party candidate in multiple scheduled by-elections in 2026.

On November 12, 2026, the Toronto Star reported Lewis had been assigned an RCMP protection detail for several weeks following the publication of a National Post article titled "Jewish law tells us how to deal with Avi Lewis," which called for physical violence against Lewis.

== Political positions ==
=== Economic policy ===
Lewis describes himself as a socialist. He advocates for a wealth tax of 1% to 3% on the top 1%, a tax on corporate profits, a crackdown on tax havens, and the end of oil and gas subsidies. He advocates for public options for groceries, telecom providers, pharmaceutical manufacturing, and the implementation of a public home builder to construct co-op, non-profit and supportive housing.

=== Housing and infrastructure ===
Lewis advocates for a national cap on rent increases, while signing protections against renovictions and displacements into law. He supports a tax on corporate landlords and investment properties. Additionally, he advocates for the federal government recognizing housing as a human right, with all federal investments and programs being required to prioritize housing use over profitability.

Lewis supports the establishment of a federal agency to build "one million social, co-op, non-profit and supportive homes within five years" of the election of a NDP majority in federal parliament.

=== Healthcare ===
Lewis stated his intention to implement universal pharma care, dental, vision, hearing, and mental health care. He also supports public options for long-term care and regulating it under the Canada Health Act.

Lewis is pro-choice, advocating for equal access to abortion services across the country.

=== Environment ===
Lewis advocates for investing 2% of Canada's GDP into fighting climate change. Half of such funding would be allocated specifically to funding a national jobs program known as the "Green Jobs Transfer" intended to transition workers in fossil fuel industries to renewable infrastructure projects such as those in "clean energy, building retrofits and public transit".

Lewis supports a windfall profits tax on the oil and gas sector.

=== Israel, Gaza and antisemitism ===
Lewis describes himself as an anti-Zionist and is a member of Independent Jewish Voices Canada.

Lewis has consistently described Israel's ongoing assault on Gaza following the October 7 attacks as a genocide. In his March 2026 acceptance speech as NDP leader, he said: "When Israel commits a genocide in Gaza, we call it by its name, and we do everything in our power to bring it to an end."

During the 2026 leadership campaign, Lewis said he sought to "unlearn and unpack the Zionist myths that most Canadian Jews were brought up with", and in a debate described Zionism as "linked inextricably to the ethnic cleansing of Palestine". On the eve of the leadership convention, the Centre for Israel and Jewish Affairs (CIJA) published an open letter that criticized the party's response to alleged incidents of anti-semitism as "inconsistent, hesitant, or clouded by rhetoric", criticizing the "repeated elevation of fringe or non-representative Jewish voices". After Lewis's election, CIJA said it received the result "with a deep sense of sadness" and that "Jewish identity is not a shield against accountability". It argued that Lewis' statements on Zionism and Israel were "telling Jewish Canadians that a core part of their identity is illegitimate".

==== Views on antisemitism in Canada ====
In October 2025, Lewis and other members of the Jewish Faculty Network co-authored a report accusing CIJA of anti-Palestinian racism and genocide denial. It claimed that CIJA promoted a "false narrative" in linking the movement for Palestinian rights to the rise of antisemitism in Canada. Lewis has stated that antisemitism is on the rise in Canada.

==== Yom Kippur statement ====
On September 20, 2026, the eve of Yom Kippur, Lewis posted on X that he was "reflecting on the fact that we failed to do our part to stop an ongoing genocide committed in our name".

Liberal MPs Anthony Housefather and Ben Carr said the post wrongly held Jews collectively responsible for Israel's actions. Housefather called it "despicable". Carr said it was "the type of narrative that is actually contributing to the type of threats that we're seeing levied against the Jewish community". The federal government's definition of antisemitism cautions against holding Jews collectively accountable for Israel's actions. CIJA argued that "when Jewish people are collectively portrayed as complicit in atrocities, that rhetoric can become a justification for targeting Jews here at home". Lewis described the criticism as "partisan", stating that holding Jews collectively responsible for Israel's actions is "dangerous", "antisemitic" and "absolutely not" what he said in his statement.

== Personal life ==
Lewis is married to journalist and author Naomi Klein. The couple have one son, Toma.

He was featured on the November 20, 2001, Life & Times episode of "The Lewis Family". Lewis' genealogical search was featured on the January 31, 2008, episode of the CBC's Who Do You Think You Are?

== Awards and nominations ==
Year	Award	Category	Nominee	Result	Refs
1995	Gemini Awards	Best Special Event Coverage	Election Night '93	Won	
1996	Gemini Awards	Best Special Event Coverage	Holy Macro Economics Taxman! – Budget '95 (as producer)	Nominated	
1999	Gemini Awards	Best Host or Interviewer in a News or Talk/General Information Program or Series	CounterSpin (as host)	Nominated	
2000	Gemini Awards	Best Host or Interviewer in a News or Talk/General Information Program or Series	CounterSpin (as host)	Nominated	
2001	Gemini Awards	Best Host or Interviewer in a News or Talk/General Information Program or Series	CounterSpin (as host)	Nominated	
2004	International Documentary Association Awards	Feature Documentaries	The Take	Nominated	
2004	American Film Institute Festival Awards	International Jury Prize	The Take	Won	
2005	Gemini Awards	Donald Brittain Award for Best Social/Political Documentary Program	The Take (as producer)	Nominated	
2005	Gemini Awards	Best Direction in a Documentary Program	The Take (as producer)	Nominated	
2015	Toronto International Film Festival Awards	People's Choice Award: Documentaries	This Changes Everything	Runner-up	
2015	CPH:DOX Awards	Politiken Audience Award	This Changes Everything	Nominated	
2015	CPH:DOX Awards	F:ACT Award	This Changes Everything	Nominated	
2016	Docville Awards	ConScience Award	This Changes Everything	Won	
2020	News and Documentary Emmy Awards	Outstanding News Analysis: Editorial and Opinion	A Message from the Future With Alexandria Ocasio-Cortez (as co-executive producer)	Nominated	

== Works ==
=== Television ===
Year	Title	Role	Notes
1996–1998	The NewMusic	Himself/host	
1998–2001	CounterSpin	Himself/host	
2006	The Big Picture with Avi Lewis	Himself/host	
2007	On the Map with Avi Lewis	Himself/host	
2008	Inside USA	Himself/host	
2009	Canada Reads	Himself/panelist	
2009–2010	Fault Lines	Himself/host	

=== Film ===
Year	Title	Director	Writer	Executive Producer	Actor/narrator	Role	Notes
2004	The Take	Yes	No	No	Yes	Himself	
2007	Why Democracy?	No	No	No	Yes	Himself	
2009	The Shock Doctrine	No	No	Yes	No	Himself	
2015	This Changes Everything	Yes	Yes	Yes	No	Himself	
2019	A Message from the Future with Alexandria Ocasio-Cortez	No	Yes	Yes	No	Himself	Short film
2020	Message from the Future II: The Years of Repair	No	Yes	No	No	Himself	Short film

== Electoral record ==
=== Summary ===
Electoral history of Avi Lewis — Constituency elections
Year	Type	Riding	Party	Votes for Lewis				Result	Swing
Year	Type	Riding	Party	Total	%	P.	±%	Result	Swing
2021	Federal election	West Vancouver—Sunshine Coast— Sea to Sky Country	New Democratic	16,265	25.63%	3rd	+11.74	Lost	Hold
2025	Federal election	Vancouver Centre	New Democratic	6,807	12.49%	3rd	−18.25	Lost	Hold

=== Leadership elections ===
2026 New Democratic Party leadership election
Candidate	First ballot	
Candidate	Votes	%
Avi Lewis	39,734	56.02%
Heather McPherson	20,899	29.46%
Tanille Johnston	5,159	7.27%
Rob Ashton	4,193	5.91%
Tony McQuail	945	1.33%
Total valid votes	70,930	99.99%
Rejected ballots	4	0.01%
Turnout	70,934	70.55%
Eligible voters	100,542	
Source: New Democratic Party

=== Federal elections ===
2025 Canadian federal election: Vancouver Centre
Party	Candidate	Votes	%	±%	Expenditures
Liberal	Hedy Fry	29,855	55.22	+14.56	$101,446.10
Conservative	Elaine Allan	16,368	30.28	+8.38	$93,043.15
New Democratic	Avi Lewis	6,807	12.59	–17.75	$118,277.26
Green	Scott MacDonald	757	1.40	–2.41	none listed
People's	Christopher Varga	211	0.39	–2.89	none listed
Independent	Drew William McPherson	63	0.12	–	none listed
Total valid votes/expense limit		54,061	99.23	–	$131,689.42
Total rejected ballots		422	0.77	–0.04	
Turnout		54,483	63.17	+6.52	
Eligible voters		86,246			
Liberal notional hold		Swing		+3.09	
Source: Elections Canada

2021 Canadian federal election: West Vancouver—Sunshine Coast—Sea to Sky Country
Party	Candidate	Votes	%	±%	Expenditures
Liberal	Patrick Weiler	21,500	33.88	–1.01	$104,912.15
Conservative	John Weston	19,062	30.04	+3.32	$132,156.43
New Democratic	Avi Lewis	16,265	25.63	+11.74	$111,019.05
Green	Mike Simpson	4,108	6.47	–15.96	$35,675.05
People's	Doug Bebb	2,299	3.62	+2.07	$26,851.78
Rhinoceros	Gordon Jeffrey	98	0.15	–0.11	none listed
Independent	Chris MacGregor	77	0.12	–	none listed
Independent	Terry Grimwood	50	0.08	–0.17	none listed
Total valid votes/expense limit		63,459	99.56	–	$131,270.53
Total rejected ballots		279	0.44	–0.08	
Turnout		63,738	64.57	–3.90	
Eligible voters		98,717			
Liberal hold		Swing		–2.17	
Source: Elections Canada

Party political offices
Preceded by Don Davies (interim)	Leader of the New Democratic Party; 2026–present	Incumbent
