= This Changes Everything (book) =

2014 book by Naomi Klein

This Changes Everything: Capitalism vs. the Climate
- Author: Naomi Klein
- Language: English
- Subject: Climate change, economics
- Genre: Nonfiction
- Publisher: Simon & Schuster
- Publication date: 2014
- Publication place: United States
- Media type: Hardcover
- ISBN: 978-1451697384
- Preceded by: The Shock Doctrine
- Followed by: No Is Not Enough

This Changes Everything: Capitalism vs. the Climate is Naomi Klein's fourth book; it was published in 2014 by Simon & Schuster. Klein argues that the climate crisis cannot be addressed in the current era of neoliberal market fundamentalism, which encourages profligate consumption and has resulted in mega-mergers and trade agreements hostile to the health of the environment.

Klein spent five years writing the book, which debuted on the New York Times bestseller list at number five on 5 October 2014. The book is credited with popularising the anti-extractivist Blockadia movement.

== Reception ==
In Rolling Stone, Roy Scranton wrote that the book "superbly dramatizes the seemingly intractable ways that global capitalism is locked into a carbon death spiral, and how small bands of activists are fighting worldwide to stop it, against increasingly punishing repression."

In The New York Times Book Review, Rob Nixon wrote that This Changes Everything was "the most momentous and contentious environmental book since Silent Spring." It was also included on The New York Times' list of 100 notable books for 2014.

In a New York Review of Books discussion on her subsequent book, On Fire: The (Burning) Case for a Green New Deal, Eric Klinenberg notes that This Changes Everything had "become a touchstone of progressive climate activism. It's the single strongest statement we have for why carbon-fueled capitalism (or 'extractivism') with its imperative of relentless growth and exploitation, is fundamentally incompatible with ecological sensibility and climate justice."

In his 2020 book The Citizen's Guide to Climate Success: Overcoming Myths That Hinder Progress, Mark Jaccard is critical of Klein's assertion that capitalism must be abolished in order to solve the climate crisis. Instead Jaccard asserts that solving climate change is completely possible in capitalist economies and that all progress on climate thus far has been made in mixed-capitalist economies. He says that abolishing capitalism is actually only Klein's preferred path to solving climate change and not essential to solving climate change as Klein declares. While acknowledging that there may be good reasons to "change everything" about capitalism, Jaccard resists that it is the best way to solve the current climate crisis.

This Changes Everything was also reviewed across different scholarly disciplines in the academic literature, with Australian business professor, Christopher Wright, commenting:

This is a book that should be read by everyone with an interest in climate politics, the contradictions of capitalism and our increasingly precarious existence on this planet.

In the Monthly Review, Professors John Bellamy Foster and Brett Clark provided detailed counter-arguments in response to what they term are the "liberal critics" of the book. They also praised the book, writing:

Klein, who in No Logo ushered in a new generational critique of commodity culture, and who in The Shock Doctrine established herself as perhaps the most prominent North American critic of neoliberal disaster capitalism, signals that she has now, in William Morris's famous metaphor, crossed "the river of fire" to become a critic of capitalism. The reason is climate change, including the fact that we have waited too long to address it, and the reality that nothing short of an ecological revolution will now do the job.

== Awards and honors ==
The book won the 2014 Hilary Weston Writers' Trust Prize for Nonfiction and was a shortlisted for the 2015 Shaughnessy Cohen Prize for Political Writing.

== Film ==
A documentary based on the book, titled This Changes Everything, was directed by Avi Lewis and produced by Alfonso Cuaron and Joslyn Barnes. Additionally, Seth MacFarlane and Danny Glover shared producer credits.

== See also ==
- Anti-capitalism – Political ideology and movement opposed to capitalism
- Criticism of capitalism – Arguments against the economic system of capitalism
- Eco-capitalism – View that capital exists in nature as "natural capital"
- Eco-socialism – Ideology merging socialism with green politics
