= The Take (2004 film) =

- Directed by: Avi Lewis
- Written by: Naomi Klein
- Narrated by: Naomi Klein and Avi Lewis
- Distributed by: First Run Features / Icarus Films
- Release date: 3 September 2004 (Venice Film Festival)
- Running time: 87 minutes
- Country: Canada
- Languages: English; Spanish

The Take is a Canadian documentary film released in 2004 by the wife and husband team of Naomi Klein and Avi Lewis. It tells the story of workers in Buenos Aires, Argentina, who reclaim control of a closed Forja auto plant where they once worked and turn it into a worker cooperative.

== Summary ==
The plant closed as a result of the economic policies of the Carlos Menem government under the watchful eye of the International Monetary Fund.

While in bankruptcy protection, the company appeared to be selling off property and inventory to pay creditors – a move which further reduced the chances of the facility returning to production. In an effort to establish their own control, the workers occupied the factory and began a long battle to win the right to operate it themselves, as a cooperative.

This collective movement has gained strength in Argentina, having started with a garment factory several years earlier. The factory workers waded through the courts and legislative system with help from the experience of these other groups who had fought the same battle, and ultimately secured their right to operate the plant. The film describes the ideological fights beyond co-operative ownership, showing how Menem regained strength as he ran for a subsequent term, despite the poor performance of his privatisation while in office. Ultimately, the workers succeed.

== Legacy ==
The Take, winner of the International Jury Prize at the American Film Institute festival, was nominated for four Gemini Awards.

Collaboration among Lewis, Klein, and Brendan Martin led to the creation of The Working World/La Base foundation. It is a non-profit microcredit aimed at cooperatives. It has been registered in the United States as the non-profit The Working World, and in June 2008 has obtained the status of an NGO in Argentina as La Base.

== See also ==
- Brukman factory
- Workers' self-management
