= This Changes Everything (2015 film) =

- Film poster
- Directed by: Avi Lewis
- Based on: This Changes Everything by Naomi Klein
- Produced by: Joslyn Barnes; Avi Lewis; Alfonso Cuarón (executive)
- Narrated by: Naomi Klein
- Cinematography: Mark Ellam
- Edited by: Nick Hector; Mary Lampson
- Music by: David Wall; Adam B. White
- Production companies: Klein Lewis Productions; Louverture Films
- Distributed by: Abramorama
- Release date: 13 September 2015 (Toronto)
- Running time: 89 minutes
- Countries: Canada; United States
- Language: English
- Box office: $16,692

This Changes Everything is a 2015 documentary film directed by Avi Lewis. It is based on the book This Changes Everything: Capitalism vs. the Climate by his wife, Naomi Klein.

The film is a Canada-United States coproduction.

At the 2015 Toronto International Film Festival, the film was first runner-up for the People's Choice Award: Documentaries.

== Synopsis ==
The film surveys a number of environmental activists around the world:

- Alberta, Canada— Crystal, a young indigenous Beaver Lake Cree Nation leader in Athabasca oil sands country, fights for access to a restricted military base.
- Powder River Basin, Montana— Mike and Alexis, a goat ranching couple impacted by oil from a broken pipeline. They organize against fossil fuel extraction and form an alliance with the Northern Cheyenne tribe to bring solar power to the nearby reservation.
- Halkidiki, Greece— Melachrini, a housewife opposed to mining and drilling projects by Canadian corporation Eldorado Gold; against the backdrop of Greece in crisis.
- Andhra Pradesh, India— Jyothi, a matriarch fighting a proposed coal-fired power plant that will destroy a wetland.
- China— Smog-choked Beijing.

== Reception ==
=== Box office ===
The domestic box office total as of 2020 is $16,692.

=== Reviews ===
The film received a mixed reaction from film critics. It garnered a 56% rating at Rotten Tomatoes, based on 16 reviews. At Metacritic, which assigns a weighted average score out of 100 to reviews from mainstream critics, the film has received a mixed or average score of 59, based on seven reviews.

Writing for the Los Angeles Times, critic Michael Rechtshaffen wrote: "They may not do enough to alter the climate change film landscape, but Klein and those impassioned protesters provide something that has been in short supply in the predecessors — namely, a modicum of hope for the future."

Writing for The Guardian, reviewer Henry Barnes stated that the "implication [of the film's opening confession from the author that she's 'always kind of hated films about climate change'] is that This Changes Everything is going to excite and inspire in a way that climate change documentaries have failed to before. It really doesn’t. It gives those of us in the affluent parts of the world more reason to feel bad and only a suggestion of what to do with that feeling."
