= Fences and Windows =

2002 non-fiction book by Naomi Klein

Fences and Windows Dispatches from the Front Lines of the Globalization Debate
- Author: Naomi Klein
- Subject: Anti-globalization
- Genre: Non-fiction
- Publisher: Vintage Canada, Picador
- Publication date: 2002
- Media type: Print (trade paperback)
- Pages: 267
- ISBN: 978-0-312-30799-8
- Dewey Decimal: 337 21
- LC Class: JZ1318 .K575 2002

Fences and Windows: Dispatches from the Front Lines of the Globalization Debate is a 2002 book by Canadian journalist Naomi Klein and editor Debra Ann Levy. The book is a collection of newspaper articles, mostly from The Globe and Mail, with a few magazine articles from The Nation and speech transcripts. The articles and speeches were all written by Klein in the 30 months after the publication of her first book, No Logo (1999), from December 1999 to March 2002. The articles focus upon the anti-globalization movement, including protest events and responses by law enforcement. The book was published in North America and the United Kingdom in October 2002.

The imagery of fences and windows appear throughout the work. The fences represent exclusion and barriers, while the windows are opportunities for expressing alternative ideas. The book garnered both positive and negative reviews. Two of the articles were singled out as exceptional by several reviewers: "America is not a Hamburger" discusses the US State Department's attempt to re-brand America's image overseas; "The Brutal Calculus of Suffering" discusses media portrayals of war.

== Background ==
The unexpected success of her first book, No Logo (1999), extended author and journalist Naomi Klein's book tour beyond its original two-week schedule. She spent the next 30 months traveling the world promoting the book as well as writing newspaper articles covering the anti-globalization movement. Most of her articles were originally published in the Canadian national newspaper The Globe and Mail, while some were published by The Nation, The New York Times, and The Guardian. During this time she resisted her publisher's urgings to write a new book, and the pressure to match No Logo's success was bearing down upon her. She relented to the pressure for another publication by collecting the best of the articles and speeches she had written since No Logo. She did not intend this new book to be a sequel or follow-up, but rather a stand alone collection of writing.

== Content ==
The first section, entitled "Windows of Dissent", begins with an article written for The New York Times, wherein she covers the 1999 Seattle protests, which she calls the coming-out party of the anti-globalization movement. The remaining five articles in the section come from The Globe and Mail, with one from The Nation; they cover the World Bank, International Monetary Fund, and World Trade Organization (WTO) protests in Washington, D.C., Prague, and Toronto from April to September 2000. She describes the protesters as hundreds of decentralized groups with various independent interests, leaderless but organized, and searching for a strategy.

The next section, "Fencing in Democracy", consists of articles from The Globe and Mail and the transcript of a speech. The section is divided into two sub-sections. The first explores some of the impacts that economic globalization has had on communities, focusing on Mexico and Argentina, and misconceptions that supporters of the WTO-associated organizations have of the anti-globalization movement. The second focuses on the co-opting of the commons, such as genetics, culture, and public sector infrastructure, for private economic gains.

The third section, "Fencing in the Movement", chronicles the escalation of security tactics to counter protesters. Klein finds that police have been removing the distinction between civil disobedience and violence and purposefully normalizing violence so it is the expected outcome, not a rare event. She matches the decline of civil liberties and freedom of speech with the rise of free speech zones, indiscriminate use of tear gas and pepper spray, plain clothes officers, surveillance, and pre-emptive arrests. The fourth section, "Capitalizing on Terror", discusses opportunism that used the September 11 attacks to further political and economic objectives. In an editorial piece for the Los Angeles Times, Klein argues that the US has sold its image too well as the land of opportunity and plenty and that rising anti-Americanism was the result of the US inability to share this.

The final section, "Windows to Democracy", contains two articles written for The Nation, two for The Globe and Mail and one for The Guardian. These articles examine potential directions for the movement to take, focusing upon the World Social Forum, Mexican Zapatistas, and political parties. The final article calls upon the movement to shift from attacking symbols of globalization at protests and use the decentralized local groups to provide alternatives: define themselves as fighting for, rather than against, something.

Most of the book's content is freely and legally available in the form of individual articles on Klein's website. The printed text has often been edited or reworked, in some cases very heavily.

== Style and themes ==
The book takes the form of an anthology of news and magazine articles, along with the transcripts of several speeches, all written by Klein between December 1999 and March 2002. With the help of Debra Ann Levy, the articles were edited to fit them better together in the book. A preface, with original writing, is used by Klein to introduce her background on how she came to write the articles, provide context for the content, and set up the themes. The two most predominant themes are the two title images, "fences" and "windows". The fences represent exclusion and are portrayed, both literally and metaphorically, as the barriers that keep protesters away from the economic meetings, the walls between factories and neighbouring impoverished communities, and the restrictions on intellectual property or the commons. The windows are opportunities where dissenting or alternative voices and ideas can be expressed.

== Publication and reception ==
Fences and Windows was published as a trade paperback by Picador in the US, Vintage Canada in Canada, and Flamingo in the UK. It was released in October 2002 with little promotion. The resulting sales were lower than expected. A portion of the book's proceeds was given to a legal defense fund for activists and for education concerning global democracy. Just after the book's release, a debate on the topic of globalization was held between Klein and The Economist journalist Sameena Ahmad in New York.

Reception to the book was mixed. Reviewers found that the collection of re-printed journalistic articles made the book sometimes repetitive, lacking details, historical context and analysis of its subjects. Some reviewers criticized the book's silence on alternatives to globalization or the democracy that lead to globalization. The writing was variously described as choppy, colourful, engaging, and straightforward. Singled out as being exceptionally well done was Klein's Los Angeles Times article "America is not a Hamburger", which described the American attempt to re-brand itself by believing that the escalating anti-Americanism was a misunderstanding rather than a reaction to American policy directions. Klein's October 2001 speech at a journalism conference in Stockholm was also singled out as being very well done. Entitled "The Brutal Calculus of Suffering", it contrasted the media depictions of American versus non-American deaths.

The reviewer for the feminist magazine Herizons wrote, "Fences and Windows was written to be read and shared and talked about and carried around in your bag. It is a book that begs you to write in the margins, and highlight relevant quotes because it's filled with stories, insights, shocking statistics, inspiring anecdotes and refreshing critiques. It's small, it's smart and it's jammed with information and ideas that inspire hope and motivate action." Similarly, reviewing for The Guardian, Stuart Christie wrote, "This is a book to be savoured and referred to every so often, even if just to recharge one's moral batteries." In The Globe and Mail, Stan Persky wrote, "What I like about Klein's reflections on the nascent movement that she both participates in and analyzes is that she indulges in minimal rhetorical rah-rah. Nor does she fudge the shortcomings and screwups of the fledgling activists."

The reviews in The Economist and Books in Canada, the latter written by Shane Neilson, were very negative. Neilson called the work "idiocy", "intellectual sloppiness that approaches dishonesty", maintaining that "the ideological failure of this book is total." He argued that Klein assumed, rather than proved, that the international organizations which were being protested against were guilty of the protesters' charges. The Economist's review criticized Klein for ignoring the benefits of globalization, like "lifting people out of poverty", and for failing to present a coherent alternative. The reviewer called Klein "an angry adolescent" and opined that her reporting was assisting "a cause that can only harm the people she claims to care most about".

== Notes ==
=== References ===
- Shipman, Alan (November 29, 2002). "Fences and Windows (Book)". The Times Literary Supplement (5200). London: 30.
- Lee, John (September 28, 2002). "Naomi Klein reports from the anti-global front lines". Vancouver Sun. p. D16.
- Smith, Jeremy (December 2002 – January 2003). "Fences and Windows (Book)". Ecologist. 32 (10): 50.
- Hari, Johann (November 11, 2002). "Whatever happened to No Logo?". New Statesman. 15: 20. ISSN 1364-7431.
- Bigge, Ryan (September 22, 2002). "Naomi Klein morphs from poster girl to public intellectual". Toronto Star. p. D14.
