= The Shock Doctrine =

2007 non-fiction book by Naomi Klein

The Shock Doctrine: The Rise of Disaster Capitalism
- Front cover of The Shock Doctrine
- Author: Naomi Klein
- Language: English
- Subject: Economics
- Publisher: Knopf Canada (first edition)
- Publication date: 2007
- Publication place: Canada
- Media type: Print; e-book
- Pages: 662 (first edition)
- ISBN: 978-0-676-97800-1 (hardcover)
- Dewey Decimal: 330.12/2
- Preceded by: Fences and Windows
- Followed by: This Changes Everything

The Shock Doctrine: The Rise of Disaster Capitalism is a 2007 book by Canadian author and social activist Naomi Klein. In the book, Klein argues that neoliberal economic policies promoted by Milton Friedman and the Chicago school of economics have risen to global prominence because of a deliberate strategy she calls "disaster capitalism". In this strategy, political actors exploit the chaos of natural disasters, wars, and other crises to push through unpopular policies such as deregulation and privatization. This economic "shock therapy" favors corporate interests while disadvantaging and disenfranchising citizens when they are too distracted and overwhelmed to respond or resist effectively. The book challenges the narrative that free market capitalist policies have been welcomed by the inhabitants of regions where they have been implemented, and it argues that several man-made events, including the Iraq War, were intentionally undertaken with the goal of pushing through these unpopular policies in their wake.

Some reviewers claimed the book oversimplifies political phenomena, while others lauded it as a compelling and important work. The book served as the main source of a 2009 documentary feature film with the same title directed by Michael Winterbottom.

== Synopsis ==
The book is divided into seven parts with a total of 21 chapters.

Part 1 begins with a chapter on psychiatric shock therapy and the covert experiments conducted by the psychiatrist Ewen Cameron in collusion with the Central Intelligence Agency. The second chapter introduces Milton Friedman and his Chicago school of economics, whom Klein describes as leading a laissez-faire capitalist movement committed to creating free markets that are even less regulated than those that existed before the Great Depression.

Part 2 discusses the use of the "shock doctrine" to transform South American economies in the 1970s, focusing on the 1973 coup in Chile led by General Augusto Pinochet and influenced by the Chicago Boys, a group of Chilean economists who had studied under Friedman at the Chicago School and were funded by the CIA. Klein connects torture with economic shock therapy.

Part 3 covers attempts to apply the shock doctrine without the need for extreme violence against sections of the population. Klein says that Margaret Thatcher applied mild shock "therapy" facilitated by the Falklands War, while free market reform in Bolivia was possible due to a combination of pre-existing economic crises and the charisma of Jeffrey Sachs.

Part 4 reports on how Klein thinks the shock doctrine was applied in Poland, China, South Africa, Russia, and the Four Asian Tigers. In Poland she discusses how the left-leaning trade union Solidarity won the country's 1989 legislative elections, but subsequently employed the shock doctrine due to IMF pressure. The section on China discusses the 1989 Tiananmen Square Protests, and the liberalization of China's economy. In South Africa she explains that the negotiations to end apartheid resulted in economic policy that went against the core of the Freedom Charter. In Russia she describes how Boris Yeltsin took power after the collapse of the Soviet Union and crafted an economic policy that turned Russia into an oligarchy. Finally, she says that during the 1997 Asian financial crisis the Tiger Nations were forced to sell off numerous state enterprises to private, foreign companies.

Part 5 introduces the "Disaster Capitalism Complex", a complex series of networks and influence employed by private companies that allows them to profit from disasters. She mirrors this new Disaster Capitalism Complex with the Military Industrial Complex and explains that both employ the blurring of the line between private and public, through tactics like the revolving door.

Part 6 discusses the use of "shock and awe" in the 2003 invasion of Iraq and the subsequent occupation of Iraq, which Klein describes as the most comprehensive and full-scale implementation of the shock doctrine ever attempted, with mass privatization of Iraqi state-owned enterprises (including thousands of men being laid off) which is argued as contributing to the insurgency, since many of the unemployed became embittered toward the US as a result and joined insurgent groups afterward.

Part 7 is about winners and losers of economic shock therapy – how small groups will often do very well by moving into luxurious gated communities while large sections of the population are left with decaying public infrastructure, declining incomes and increased unemployment. Klein describes economic policy after Hurricane Katrina, the 2004 Sri Lanka Tsunami, and the apartheid-style policy of the Israeli government toward Palestinians.

The Conclusion details the backlash against the "shock doctrine" and economic institutions which, in Klein's view, encourage it – like the World Bank and IMF. South America and Lebanon post-2006 are shown in a positive light, where politicians are already rolling back free-market policies, with some mention of the increased campaigning by community-minded activists in South Africa and China.

== Reception ==
Paul B. Farrell from the Dow Jones Business News argued that The Shock Doctrine "may be the most important book on economics in the 21st century." In The Guardian, John Gray hailed it as one of the "very few books that really help us understand the present", describing the work as "both timely and devastating". William S. Kowinski of the San Francisco Chronicle praised Klein's prose and wrote that the author "may well have revealed the master narrative of our time." In The Irish Times, Tom Clonan reported that she "systematically and calmly demonstrates to the reader" the way in which neoconservative figures were intimately linked to seismic events that "resulted in the loss of millions of lives."

In the Los Angeles Times, Richard Rayner opined, "Not everybody's going to agree with her, but this is reporting and history-writing in the tradition of Izzy Stone and Upton Sinclair. Klein upends assumptions and demands that we think – her book is thrilling, troubling and very dark." Stephen Amidon of the New York Observer affirmed the applicability of Klein's thesis to the Iraq War and argued, "Seen through the lens of Naomi Klein's analysis, [it] makes horrifying sense, right down to Mr. Rumsfeld's decision to allow the looting of the nation's cultural identity." Shashi Tharoor noted the work's "meticulous endnotes" and stated, referring to globalization, that Klein "has established herself as its principal naysayer." Katy Guest of The Independent praised the book as "a compelling account of the way big business and politics use global disasters for their own ends." Juan Santos, winner of the 2016 Nobel Peace Prize, called the book "as gripping as the best murder mystery, as well researched as the best investigative journalism – on a par with the work of a Seymour Hersh."

The Shock Doctrine was named one of the best books of 2007 by the Village Voice, Publishers Weekly, The Observer, and the Seattle Times. In 2019, The Guardian ranked it the 18th greatest book since 2000.

The Nobel Laureate and former Chief Economist of the World Bank Joseph Stiglitz wrote a review of The Shock Doctrine for The New York Times calling the parallel between economic shock therapy and the psychological experiments conducted by Ewen Cameron "overdramatic and unconvincing" and claiming that "Klein is not an academic and cannot be judged as one. There are many places in her book where she oversimplifies." He also said, "the case against these policies is even stronger than the one Klein makes" and that the book contains "a rich description of the political machinations required to force unsavory economic policies on resisting countries." Shashi Tharoor in The Washington Post says that The Shock Doctrine takes Klein's criticism of capitalism an important step further. He also said Klein "is too ready to see conspiracies where others might discern little more than the all-too-human pattern of chaos and confusion, good intentions and greed."

Sociologists as Ulrich Beck envisioned the society of risk as a new cultural value which posed risk as a commodity to be exchanged in globalized economies. As Klein observed, this suggested that disasters and capitalist economy was inevitably entwined. Some voices have praised the contributions of Klein to the study of the "spectacle of disasters".

In the London Review of Books, Stephen Holmes criticizes The Shock Doctrine as naïve, and opines that it conflates "'free market orthodoxy' with predatory corporate behaviour." John Willman of the Financial Times describes it as "a deeply flawed work that blends together disparate phenomena to create a beguiling – but ultimately dishonest – argument." Tom Redburn in The New York Times states that "what she is most blind to is the necessary role of entrepreneurial capitalism in overcoming the inherent tendency of any established social system to lapse into stagnation."

Jonathan Chait wrote in The New Republic that Klein "pays shockingly (but, given her premises, unsurprisingly) little attention to right-wing ideas. She recognizes that neoconservatism sits at the heart of the Iraq war project, but she does not seem to know what neoconservatism is; and she makes no effort to find out." Robert Cole from The Times said, "Klein derides the 'disaster capitalism complex' and the profits and privatisations that go with it but she does not supply a cogently argued critique of free market principles, and without this The Shock Doctrine descends into a muddle of stories that are often worrying, sometimes interesting, and occasionally bizarre."

Economist Tyler Cowen, who called Klein's arguments "ridiculous" and the book a "true economics disaster", wrote on The New York Sun that the book contains "a series of fabricated claims, such as the suggestion that Margaret Thatcher created the Falkland Islands crisis to crush the unions and foist unfettered capitalism upon an unwilling British public." Johan Norberg of the libertarian Cato Institute criticizes the book, saying that "Klein's analysis is hopelessly flawed at virtually every level." Norberg finds fault with specifics of the analysis, such as with the Chinese government crackdown on the Tiananmen Square protests of 1989. He argues that, rather than crushing opposition to pro-market reforms (as Klein would have it), the crackdown itself caused liberalization to stall for years. Klein responded on her website to both Norberg and Chait, stating that both had misrepresented her positions. Klein wrote that Norberg had erected a straw man by claiming that her book is about one man, Friedman, but that it is in fact about a "multifaceted ideological trend". Norberg again responded that Klein "actually defends only one of her central claims that I criticized. Instead, she gives the impression that I have just tried to find small mistakes here and there in her book." He went on to say that the numbers Klein supplied in her reply reveal the statistics in her central argument to be "rubbish".

== Later comments ==
In a piece related to the COVID-19 pandemic, Klein wrote in 2020 that a "Pandemic Shock Doctrine" was beginning to emerge and called it the "Screen New Deal".

== Awards ==
- Winner of the Warwick Prize for Writing (2008/2009)

== See also ==
- Chicago school of economics
- Confessions of an Economic Hit Man
- Criticism of capitalism
- History of Russia (1991–present)#"Shock_therapy"
- Fearmongering
- Political economy
- Shock therapy (economics)
