= No Logo =

1999 nonfiction book by Naomi Klein

No Logo: Taking Aim at the Brand Bullies
- Front cover of No Logo
- Author: Naomi Klein
- Language: English
- Subject: Alter-globalization
- Genre: Non-fiction
- Publisher: Knopf Canada, Picador
- Publication date: December 1999
- Publication place: Canada
- Media type: Print (hardcover & paperback)
- Pages: 490 (first edition)
- ISBN: 978-0-312-20343-6
- Followed by: Fences and Windows

No Logo: Taking Aim at the Brand Bullies is a book by the Canadian author Naomi Klein. First published by Knopf Canada and Picador in December 1999, shortly after the 1999 Seattle WTO protests had generated media attention around such issues, it became one of the most influential books about the alter-globalization movement and an international bestseller.

The book focuses on corporate branding and makes connections with the anti-globalization movement. Throughout the four sections of the book, titled "No Space", "No Choice", "No Jobs", and "No Logo", Klein examines issues such as sweatshops in the Americas and Asia, culture jamming, corporate censorship, and Reclaim the Streets. Specific attention is given to the deeds and misdeeds of Nike, The Gap, McDonald's, Shell and Microsoft, as well the lawyers, contractors, and advertising agencies of these corporations. While globalization is a recurring theme, Klein rarely addresses the topic directly, and discusses it in much greater detail in her 2002 book Fences and Windows.

== Summary ==
The book is structured into four distinct sections: "No Space," which examines the encroachment of corporate branding into public and private spheres; "No Choice," which critiques the consolidation of retail and the homogenization of consumer culture; "No Jobs," which investigates the shift toward outsourcing and the precarious nature of low-wage service employment; and "No Logo," which documents the rise of activist movements and the emergence of anti-corporate resistance as a global political force. The first three sections deal with the negative effects of brand-oriented corporate activity, while the fourth and final section discusses various movements that arose in opposition to the corporate activities discussed in the rest of the book.

=== "No Space" ===
The book begins by tracing the history of brands. Klein argues that there has been a shift in the usage of branding and gives examples of this shift to "anti-brand" branding. Early examples of brands were often used to put a recognizable face on factory-produced products. These slowly gave way to the idea of selling lifestyles. According to Klein, in response to an economic crash in the late 1980s (due to the Latin American debt crisis, Black Monday (1987), the savings and loan crisis, and the Japanese asset price bubble), corporations began to seriously rethink their approach to marketing and to target the youth demographic, as opposed to the baby boomers, who had previously been considered a much more valuable segment.

The book discusses how brand names such as Nike or Pepsi expanded beyond the mere products which bore their names, and how these names and logos began to appear everywhere. As this happened, the brands' obsession with the youth market drove them to further associate themselves with whatever the youth considered "cool". Along the way, the brands attempted to associate their names with everything from movie stars and athletes to grassroots social movements.

Klein argues that large multinational corporations consider the marketing of a brand name to be more important than the actual manufacture of products; this theme recurs in the book, and Klein suggests that it helps explain the shift to production in Third World countries in such industries as clothing, footwear, and computer hardware. This section also looks at ways in which brands have "muscled" their presence into the school system, and how in doing so, they have pipelined advertisements into the schools and used their position to gather information about the students. Klein argues that this is part of a trend toward targeting younger and younger consumers.

=== "No Choice" ===
In the second section, Klein discusses how brands use their size and clout to limit the number of choices available to the public – whether through market dominance (e.g., Wal-Mart) or through aggressive invasion of a region (e.g., Starbucks). Klein argues that each company's goal is to become the dominant force in its respective field. Meanwhile, other corporations, such as Sony or Disney, simply open their own chains of stores, preventing the competition from even putting their products on the shelves.

This section discusses the way that corporations merge with one another in order to add to their ubiquity and provide greater control over their image. ABC News, for instance, is allegedly under pressure not to air any stories that are overly critical of Disney, its parent company. Other chains, such as Wal-Mart, often threaten to pull various products off their shelves, forcing manufacturers and publishers to comply with their demands. This might mean driving down manufacturing costs or changing the artwork or content of products like magazines or albums so they better fit with Wal-Mart's image of family friendliness. Also discussed is the way that corporations abuse copyright laws in order to silence anyone who might attempt to criticize their brand.

=== "No Jobs" ===
In this section, the book takes a darker tone and looks at the way in which manufacturing jobs move from local factories to foreign countries, and particularly to places known as export processing zones. Such zones often have no labor laws, leading to dire working conditions. The book then shifts back to North America, where the lack of manufacturing jobs has led to an influx of work in the service sector, where most of the jobs are for minimum wage and offer no benefits. The term "McJob" is introduced, defined as a job with poor compensation that does not keep pace with inflation, inflexible or undesirable hours, little chance of advancement, and high levels of stress. Meanwhile, the public is being sold the perception that these jobs are temporary employment for students and recent graduates, and therefore need not offer living wages or benefits.

This trend developed alongside increased corporate profitability and wealth accumulation. Concurrently, a segment of workforce grew critical of corporate financial success. This shift in public and employee sentiment has been attributed to factors such as rising unemployment, international labour disputes, environmental concerns, and the expansion of corporate advertising.

=== "No Logo" ===
The final section of the book discusses various movements that have sprung up during the 1990s. These include Adbusters magazine and the culture-jamming movement, as well as Reclaim the Streets and the McLibel trial. Less radical protests are also discussed, such as the various movements aimed at putting an end to sweatshop labour. Klein concludes by contrasting consumerism and citizenship, opting for the latter. "When I started this book," she writes, "I honestly didn't know whether I was covering marginal atomized scenes of resistance or the birth of a potentially broad-based movement. But as time went on, what I clearly saw was a movement forming before my eyes."

== Reception ==
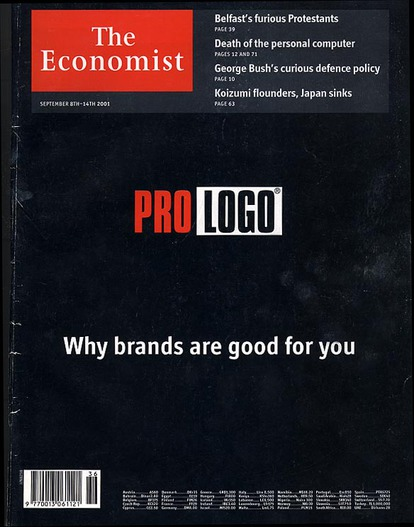
A cover of The Economist (8 September 2001) in reference to No Logo

After the book's release, Klein was heavily criticized by the newspaper The Economist, leading to a broadcast debate with Klein and the magazine's writers, dubbed "No Logo vs. Pro Logo". The 2004 book The Rebel Sell (published as Nation of Rebels in the United States) specifically criticized No Logo, stating that turning the improving quality of life in the working class into a fundamentally anti-market ideology is shallow. Nike published a point-by-point response to the book, attempting to refute each of the statements Klein had made about the company's labor practices.

== Awards ==
In 2000, No Logo was short-listed for the Guardian First Book Award in 2000. In 2001, the book won the following awards:

- The 2001 National Business Book Award
- The 2001 French Prix Médiations

== Editions ==
Several imprints of No Logo exist, including a hardcover first edition, a subsequent hardcover edition, and a paperback. A 10th anniversary edition, published by Fourth Estate, includes a new introduction by the author. Translations from the original English into several other languages have also been published. The subtitle, "Taking Aim at the Brand Bullies", was dropped in some later editions.

== Video ==
Naomi Klein explains her ideas in the 40-minute video No Logo – Brands, Globalization & Resistance (2003), directed by Sut Jhally, later distributed by Media Education Foundation.

== Legacy ==
Members of the English rock group Radiohead recommended the book to fans on their website and was rumored to have considered calling the album Kid A "No Logo" for a time. Argentine artist Indio Solari wrote a song for his first solo album named "Nike es la cultura" ("Nike is the culture"), in which he says, "You shout No Logo! Or you don't shout No Logo! Or you shout No Logo No!" in reference to this book. Argentine-American rock singer Kevin Johansen wrote a song, "Logo", inspired by Klein's book. A copy of No Logo is even used in the official video for the song. Dave Longstreth of american indie-pop band Dirty Projectors names the book and its author in their 2016 song "Keep Your Name"

== See also ==
- China Blue
- Culture industry
- Occupy movement
- The Society of the Spectacle
- The Corporation (2003 film)
