= Canadian Centre for Policy Alternatives =

Canadian think tank

- Abbreviation: CCPA
- Formation: 1980
- Type: Public policy think tank, charity
- Headquarters: 141 Laurier Ave. West; Ottawa, Ontario, Canada
- Website: policyalternatives.ca

The Canadian Centre for Policy Alternatives (CCPA) is an independent think tank in Canada. It has been described as "left leaning".

The CCPA concentrates on economic policy, international trade, environmental justice and social policy. It is especially known for publishing an alternative federal budget on an annual basis. The centre is based in Ottawa but has branch offices in Winnipeg, Regina, Toronto and Halifax. It is funded primarily through individual donations, research grants, and trade unions.

== History ==
The CCPA was founded in Ottawa in 1980 by a group of university professors and union activists. Many of those first involved with the CCPA's founding wanted to use it to counter the neoliberal consensus that was emerging during this period. Following its formation, the centre began organizing conferences, publishing pamphlets, and producing booklets and reports created by volunteer researchers.

The organization ran into financial difficulties in the late 1980s due to inadequate funding. However, it was able to successfully lobby trade unions and other NGOs in the early 1990s to take out memberships. In 1994, the centre's capacities expanded further when it increased membership outreach to individual donors. It then went on to set up provincial offices across the country. By 2002, it had established offices in British Columbia, Manitoba, Nova Scotia, and Saskatchewan.

In 2012, the Canada Revenue Agency launched a $13.4-million program through which it undertook a political audit of 52 charities, including the CCPA, "to determine whether any [were] violating a rule that limits their spending on political activities to 10 per cent of resources". In 2014, the CRA claimed on its website that the CCPA appeared to be "biased" and "one-sided." In an open letter, 400 academics called for a moratorium on the CCPA audit, claiming that it was an attempt by the Conservative Party of Canada government to "intimidate, muzzle and silence its critics". The Toronto Star reported that two Canadian market-oriented think tanks, the C. D. Howe Institute and the Macdonald–Laurier Institute, were not under audit at the time.

== Projects and initiatives ==
=== Alternative federal budget ===
In 1995, the CCPA published its first alternative federal budget (AFB) with the Winnipeg-based CHO!CES. The AFB has since become the centre’s signature initiative. The AFB is a collaborative project that includes inputs from various civil society groups from across the country. It typically contains about 20 chapters that are each written by field experts and reviewed in consultation with other researchers and advocates.

=== The Monitor ===
In 1994, the CCPA launched The Monitor, which continues to serve as the organization’s regularly-published flagship magazine that complies analyses conducted by their researchers and affiliates.

== See also ==
- Ed Finn
- Kate McInturff
- Jim Stanford
