= Education reform =

Changing how people are taught, especially on a mass scale

Education reform is the goal of changing public education. The meaning and educational methods have changed through debates over what content or experiences result in an educated individual or an educated society. Historically, the motivations for reform have not reflected the current needs of society. A consistent theme of reform includes the idea that large systematic changes to educational standards will produce social returns in citizens' health, wealth, and well-being.

As part of the broader social and political processes, the term education reform refers to the chronology of significant, systematic revisions made to amend the educational legislation, standards, methodology, and policy affecting a nation's public school system to reflect the needs and values of contemporary society. In the 18th century, classical education instruction from an in-home personal tutor, hired at the family's expense, was primarily a privilege for children from wealthy families. Innovations such as encyclopedias, public libraries, and grammar schools aimed to relieve some of the financial burden of the classical education model. Motivations during the Victorian era emphasized the importance of self-improvement. Victorian education focused on teaching commercially valuable topics, such as modern languages and mathematics, rather than classical liberal arts subjects, such as Latin, art, and history.

Motivations for education reformists like Horace Mann and his proponents focused on making schooling more accessible and developing a robust state-supported common school system. John Dewey, an early 20th-century reformer, focused on improving society by advocating for a scientific, pragmatic, or democratic principle-based curriculum. Maria Montessori, meanwhile, incorporated humanistic motivations to "meet the needs of the child". In historic Prussia, a drive to foster national unity led to formal education focused on teaching national-language literacy to young children, resulting in Kindergarten.

The history of educational pedagogy in the United States has ranged from teaching literacy and proficiency of religious doctrine to establishing cultural literacy, assimilating immigrants into a democratic society, producing a skilled labor force for the industrialized workplace, preparing students for careers, and competing in a global marketplace. Educational inequality is also a motivation for education reform, seeking to address problems of a community.

== Motivations ==
Education reform, in general, implies a continual effort to modify and improve the institution of education. Over time, as the needs and values of society change, attitudes towards public education also change. As a social institution, education plays an integral role in the process of socialization. "Socialization is broadly composed of distinct inter- and intra-generational processes. Both involve the harmonization of an individual's attitudes and behaviors with that of their socio-cultural milieu." Educational matrices aim to reinforce those socially acceptable informal and formal norms, values, and beliefs that individuals need to learn in order to be accepted as good, functioning, and productive members of their society. Education reform is the process of constantly renegotiating and restructuring the educational standards to reflect the ever-evolving contemporary ideals of social, economic, and political culture. Reforms can be based on bringing education into alignment with a society's core values. Reforms that attempt to change a society's core values can connect alternative education initiatives with a network of other alternative institutions.

Education reform has been pursued for a variety of reasons, but most reforms aim to redress societal ills such as poverty-, gender-, or class-based inequities, or perceived ineffectiveness. Current education trends in the United States represent multiple achievement gaps across ethnicities, income levels, and geographies. As McKinsey and Company reported in a 2009 analysis, "These educational gaps impose on the United States the economic equivalent of a permanent national recession." Reforms are usually proposed by thinkers who aim to redress societal ills or institute societal changes, most often through a change in the education of the members of a class of people—the preparation of a ruling class to rule or a working class to work, the social hygiene of a lower or immigrant class, the preparation of citizens in a democracy or republic, etc. The idea that all children should be provided with a high level of education is a relatively recent idea, and has arisen largely in the context of Western democracy in the 20th century.

The "beliefs" of school districts are optimistic that quite literally "all students will succeed", which in the context of high school graduation examination in the United States, all students in all groups, regardless of heritage or income will pass tests typically fall beyond the ability of all but the top 20 to 30 percent of students. The claims clearly renounce historical research that shows that all ethnic and income groups score differently on all standardized tests and standards based assessments and that students will achieve on a bell curve. Instead, education officials across the world believe that by setting clear, achievable, higher standards, aligning the curriculum, and assessing outcomes, learning can be increased for all students, and more students can succeed than the 50 percent who are defined to be above or below grade level by norm referenced standards.

States have tried to use state schools to increase state power, especially to make better soldiers and workers, and increase nationalism. This strategy was first adopted to unify related linguistic groups in Europe, including France, Germany and Italy. Exact mechanisms are unclear, but it often fails in areas where populations are culturally segregated, as when the U.S. Indian school service failed to suppress Lakota and Navaho, or when a culture has widely respected autonomous cultural institutions, as when the Spanish failed to suppress Catalan.

Advocates of democracy suggest that improving public education leads to better government. They reason that democracies rely on citizens who can think clearly and make informed decisions, and education helps people develop those abilities.

Politically motivated educational reforms of the democratic type are recorded as far back as Plato in The Republic. In the United States, this lineage of democratic education reform was continued by Thomas Jefferson, who advocated ambitious reforms partly along Platonic lines for public schooling in Virginia.

Another motivation for reform is the desire to address socio-economic problems, which many people see as having significant roots in lack of education. Starting in the 20th century, people have attempted to argue that small improvements in education can have large returns in such areas as health, wealth and well-being. For example, in Kerala, India in the 1950s, increases in women's health were correlated with increases in female literacy rates. In Iran, increased primary education was correlated with increased farming efficiencies and income. In both cases some researchers have concluded these correlations as representing an underlying causal relationship: education causes socio-economic benefits. In the case of Iran, researchers concluded that the improvements were due to farmers gaining reliable access to national crop prices and scientific farming information.

== History ==
=== Classical education ===
As taught from the 18th to the 19th century, Western classical education curriculums focused on concrete details like "Who?", "What?", "When?", "Where?". Unless carefully taught, large group instruction naturally neglects asking the theoretical "Why?" and "Which?" questions that can be discussed in smaller groups.

Classical education in this period also did not teach local (vernacular) languages and culture. Instead, it taught high-status ancient languages (Greek and Latin) and their cultures. This produced odd social effects in which an intellectual class might be more loyal to ancient cultures and institutions than to their native vernacular languages and their actual governing authorities.

=== 18th century ===
==== Child-centered pedagogy ====
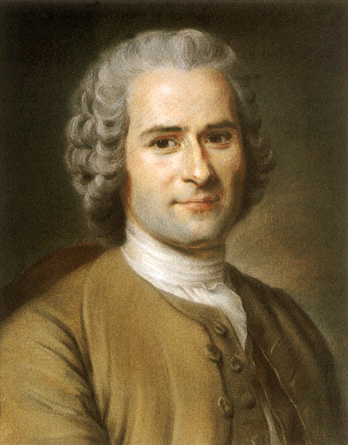
Jean-Jacques Rousseau

Jean-Jacques Rousseau, father of the Child Study Movement, centered the child as an object of study.

In Emile: Or, On Education, Rousseau's principal work on education lays out an educational program for a hypothetical newborn's education through adulthood.

Rousseau provided a dual critique of the educational vision outlined in Plato's Republic and that of his society in contemporary Europe. He regarded the educational methods contributing to the child's development; he held that a person could either be a man or a citizen. While Plato's plan could have brought the latter at the expense of the former, contemporary education failed at both tasks. He advocated a radical withdrawal of the child from society and an educational process that utilized the child's natural potential and curiosity, teaching the child by confronting them with simulated real-life obstacles and conditioning the child through experience rather intellectual instruction.

Rousseau ideas were rarely implemented directly, but influenced later thinkers, particularly Johann Heinrich Pestalozzi and Friedrich Wilhelm August Fröbel, the inventor of the kindergarten.

In the 1760s, David Manson, a schoolmaster in Belfast, Ireland, developed a peer-teaching and monitoring system within the context of what he called a "play school" that dispensed with "the discipline of the rod". There is no evidence that Manson's "sensory, logical and child-orientated" pedagogy was directly influenced by Rousseau, but it does appear to have foreshadowed some of the experiments usually ascribed to a new school of educationalists that Rousseau inspired.

What is suggested is that John Locke's child-centred pedagogical theories "set the terms by which education was debated in eighteenth century Ireland", and that, consciously or not, Manson's pedagogy was "an exemplar of the Lockean approach". Manson does refer to Locke, but it is to distinguish his own "Plan for the improvement of children in virtue and learning" (1764) as being one entirely "without the use of the rod". While Locke (Some Thoughts Concerning Education, 1693) allows for physical correction in cases of "obstinacy". Manson suggests that direct challenges to a teacher's authority can be avoided either by "the force of example" or by proposing what is otherwise commanded as "a matter of choice, or as a particular favour granted the child". Such alternatives may take "more time than the discipline of the rod", but "the rod only quenches the flame [of resentment] which will break out afterwards in greater fury than before".

==== National identity ====
European and Asian nations regard education as essential to maintaining national, cultural, and linguistic unity. In the late 18th century (~1779), Prussia instituted primary school reforms expressly to teach a unified version of the national language, "Hochdeutsch".

One significant reform was kindergarten whose purpose was to have the children participate in supervised activities taught by instructors who spoke the national language. The concept embraced the idea that children absorb new language skills more easily and quickly when they are young

The current model of kindergarten is reflective of the Prussian model.

In other countries, such as the Soviet Union, France, Spain, and Germany, the Prussian model has dramatically improved reading and math test scores for linguistic minorities.

=== 19th century England ===
In the 19th century, before the advent of government-funded public schools, Protestant organizations established Charity Schools to educate the lower social classes. The Roman Catholic Church and governments later adopted the model.

Designed to be inexpensive, Charity schools operated on minimal budgets and strived to serve as many needy children as possible. This led to the development of grammar schools, which primarily focused on teaching literacy, grammar, and bookkeeping skills so that the students could use books as an inexpensive resource to continue their education. Grammar was the first third of the then-prevalent system of classical education.

Educators Joseph Lancaster and Andrew Bell developed the monitorial system, also known as "mutual instruction" or the "Bell–Lancaster method" (which, their contemporary, educationalist and writer Elizabeth Hamilton, suggested was in important aspects "anticipated" by David Manson. Lancaster, an impoverished Quaker during the early 19th century in London and Bell at the Madras School of India developed this model independent of one another. However, by design, their model utilizes more advanced students as a resource to teach the less advanced students; achieving student-teacher ratios as small as 1:2 and educating more than 1000 students per adult. The lack of adult supervision at the Lancaster school resulted in the older children acting as disciplinary monitors and taskmasters.

To provide order and promote discipline the school implemented a unique internal economic system, inventing a currency called a Scrip. Although the currency was worthless in the outside world, it was created at a fixed exchange rate from a student's tuition and student's could use scrip to buy food, school supplies, books, and other items from the school store. Students could earn scrip through tutoring. To promote discipline, the school adopted a work-study model. Every job of the school was bid-for by students, with the largest bid winning. However, any student tutor could auction positions in his or her classes to earn scrip. The bids for student jobs paid for the adult supervision.

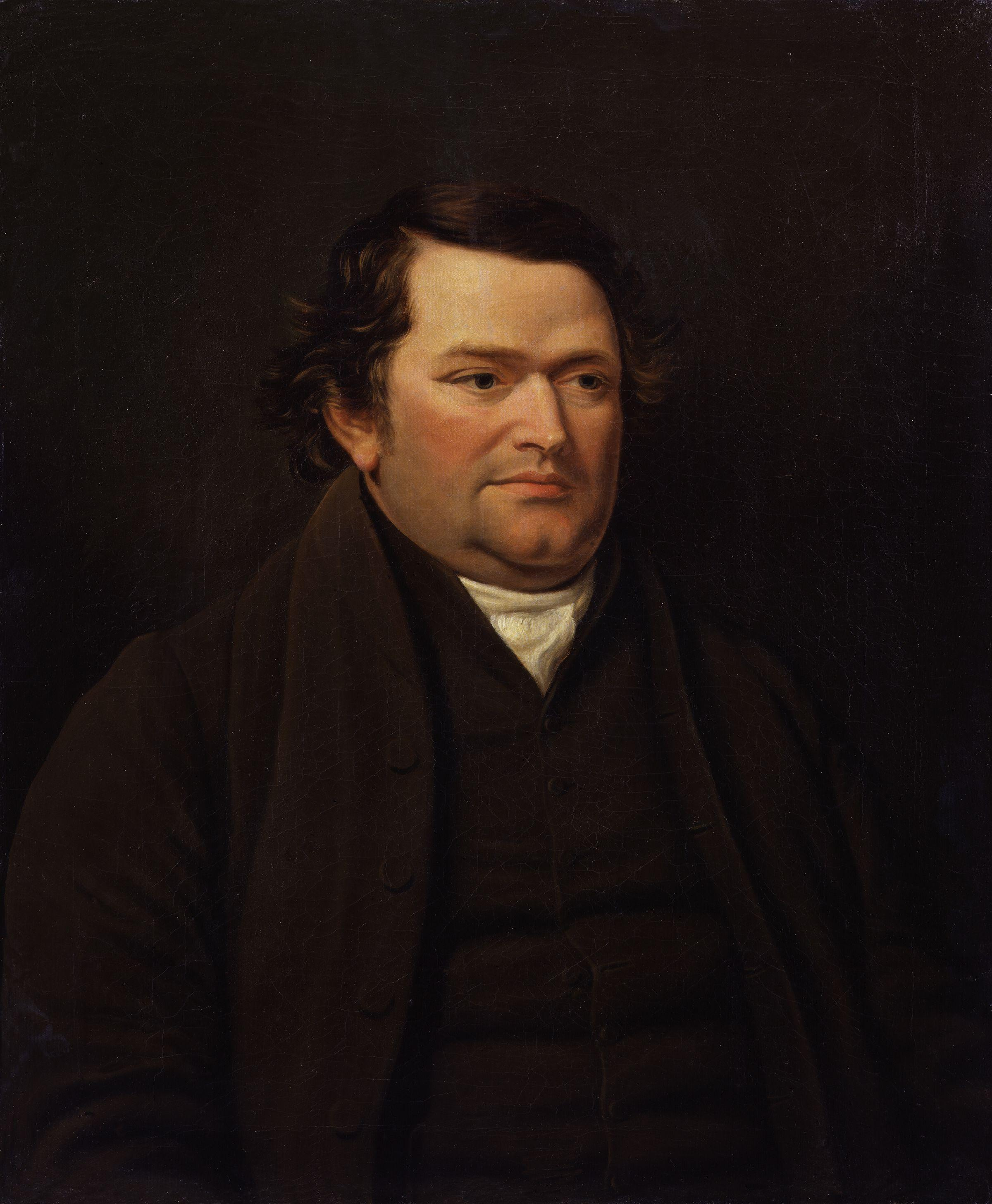
Joseph Lancaster

Lancaster promoted his system in a piece called Improvements in Education that spread widely throughout the English-speaking world. Lancaster schools provided a grammar-school education with fully developed internal economies for a cost per student near $40 per year in 2010 U.S. dollars. To reduce cost and motivated to save up scrip, Lancaster students rented individual pages of textbooks from the school library instead of purchasing the textbook. Student's would read aloud their pages to groups. Students commonly exchanged tutoring and paid for items and services with receipts from down tutoring.

The schools did not teach submission to orthodox Christian beliefs or government authorities. As a result, most English-speaking countries developed mandatory publicly paid education explicitly to keep public education in "responsible" hands. These elites said that Lancaster schools might become dishonest, provide poor education, and were not accountable to established authorities. Lancaster's supporters responded that any child could cheat given the opportunity, and that the government was not paying for the education and thus deserved no say in their composition.

Though motivated by charity, Lancaster claimed in his pamphlets to be surprised to find that he lived well on the income of his school, even while the low costs made it available to the most impoverished street children. Ironically, Lancaster lived on the charity of friends in his later life.

=== Modern reformist ===
Although educational reform occurred on a local level at various points throughout history, the modern notion of education reform is tied with the spread of compulsory education. Economic growth and the spread of democracy raised the value of education and increased the importance of ensuring that all children and adults have access to free, high-quality, effective education. Modern education reforms are increasingly driven by a growing understanding of what works in education and how to go about successfully improving teaching and learning in schools. However, in some cases, the reformers' goals of "high-quality education" has meant "high-intensity education", with a narrow emphasis on teaching individual, test-friendly subskills quickly, regardless of long-term outcomes, developmental appropriateness, or broader educational goals.

==== Horace Mann ====
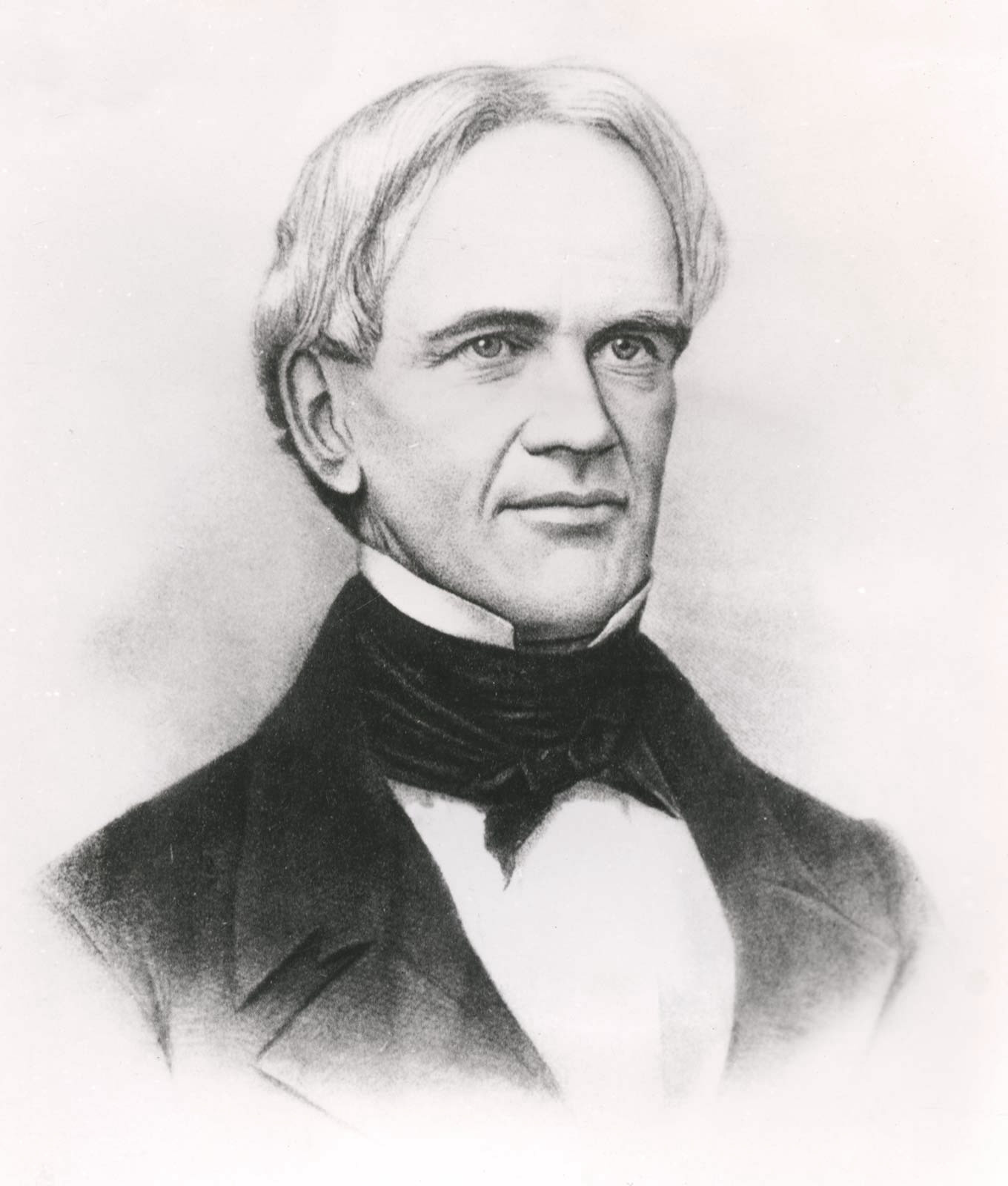
Horace Mann, regarded as the father of American public education.

In the United States, Horace Mann (1796–1859) of Massachusetts used his political base and role as Secretary of the Massachusetts State Board of Education to promote public education in his home state and nationwide. Advocating a substantial public investment be made in education, Mann and his proponents developed a strong system of state supported common schools.

His crusading style attracted wide middle class support. Historian Ellwood P. Cubberley asserts:

No one did more than he to establish in the minds of the American people the conception that education should be universal, non-sectarian, free, and that its aims should be social efficiency, civic virtue, and character, rather than mere learning or the advancement of sectarian ends.

In 1852, Massachusetts passed a law making education mandatory. This model of free, accessible education spread throughout the country and Mississippi was the final state to adopt the law (in 1917).

==== John Dewey ====
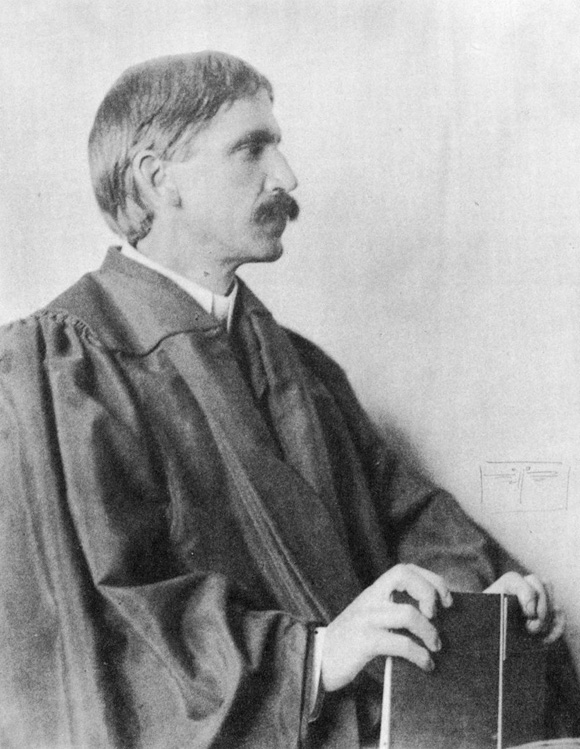
John Dewey

John Dewey, a philosopher and educator based in Chicago and New York, helped conceptualize the role of American and international education during the first four decades of the 20th century. An important member of the American Pragmatist movement, he carried the subordination of knowledge to action into the educational world by arguing for experiential education that would enable children to learn theory and practice simultaneously; a well-known example is the practice of teaching elementary physics and biology to students while preparing a meal. He was a harsh critic of "dead" knowledge disconnected from practical human life.

Dewey criticized the rigidity and volume of humanistic education, and the emotional idealizations of education based on the child-study movement that had been inspired by Rousseau and those who followed him. Dewey understood that children are naturally active and curious and learn by doing. Dewey's understanding of logic is presented in his work "Logic, the Theory of Inquiry" (1938). His educational philosophies were presented in "My Pedagogic Creed", The School and Society, The Child and Curriculum, and Democracy and Education (1916). Bertrand Russell criticized Dewey's conception of logic, saying "What he calls "logic" does not seem to me to be part of logic at all; I should call it part of psychology."

Dewey left the University of Chicago in 1904 over issues relating to the Dewey School.

Dewey's influence began to decline in the time after the Second World War and particularly in the Cold War era, as more conservative educational policies came to the fore.

==== Administrative progressives ====
The form of educational progressivism which was most successful in having its policies implemented has been dubbed "administrative progressivism" by historians. This began to be implemented in the early 20th century. While influenced particularly in its rhetoric by Dewey and even more by his popularizers, administrative progressivism was in its practice much more influenced by the Industrial Revolution and the concept economies of scale.

The administrative progressives are responsible for many features of modern American education, especially American high schools: counseling programs, the move from many small local high schools to large centralized high schools, curricular differentiation in the form of electives and tracking, curricular, professional, and other forms of standardization, and an increase in state and federal regulation and bureaucracy, with a corresponding reduction of local control at the school board level. (Cf. "State, federal, and local control of education in the United States", below)

== By country ==
Education reform in the United States has a long history and many barriers and persisting issues.

=== Ireland ===
Education reform in the Republic of Ireland has included the expansion of access to second-level education, statutory reform of school governance, curriculum change, and restructuring of further and higher education. A major access reform was the introduction of free post-primary education, announced in a Department of Education circular dated 1 February 1967 and effective from 1 September 1967. The European Commission's Eurydice profile for Ireland states that free post-primary education, introduced in 1967, led to a major increase in pupil participation.

The Education Act 1998 provided a general statutory framework for primary, post-primary, adult and continuing education. The Act made provision for school recognition and funding, boards of management, the Inspectorate, the role of principals and teachers, and the National Council for Curriculum and Assessment. Subsequent school-level reforms have included the Framework for Junior Cycle, published in 2015, and the Senior Cycle Redevelopment programme, described by the Department of Education and Youth as being guided by a vision of "equity and excellence for all". Inclusion policy has also been a continuing reform theme. The Department's Delivering Equality of Opportunity in Schools programme targets educational needs of children and young people from disadvantaged communities from pre-school through second-level education.

In further and higher education, structural reforms have included the Education and Training Boards Act 2013, which dissolved vocational education committees and established Education and Training Boards for the coordination and delivery of education and training. The National Strategy for Higher Education to 2030 set out a reform agenda for higher education's roles in teaching and learning, research, scholarship and engagement with wider society. The Technological Universities Act 2018 provided for the establishment and governance of technological universities and for the dissolution or transfer of functions of institutes of technology in specified circumstances.

The Higher Education Authority Act 2022 revised the role of the Higher Education Authority by providing for system performance frameworks, performance agreements with designated institutions, and functions related to teaching, learning, research, governance, equality of opportunity and student success. The HEA and the Department of Further and Higher Education, Research, Innovation and Science also publish the National Access Plan 2022–2028 for equity of access, participation and success in higher education. In 2022, the HEA announced that the National Forum for the Enhancement of Teaching and Learning in Higher Education and a Teaching and Learning Committee would operate under the auspices of the HEA, advising the HEA Board on teaching-and-learning enhancement in Irish higher education.

== Cross-cutting issues ==
=== Learning crisis ===
The learning crisis is the reality that while the majority of children around the world attend school, a large proportion of them are not learning. A World Bank study found that "53 percent of children in low- and middle-income countries cannot read and understand a simple story by the end of primary school." While schooling has increased rapidly over the last few decades, learning has not followed suit. Many practitioners and academics call for education system reform in order to address the learning needs of all children.

=== Digital education ===
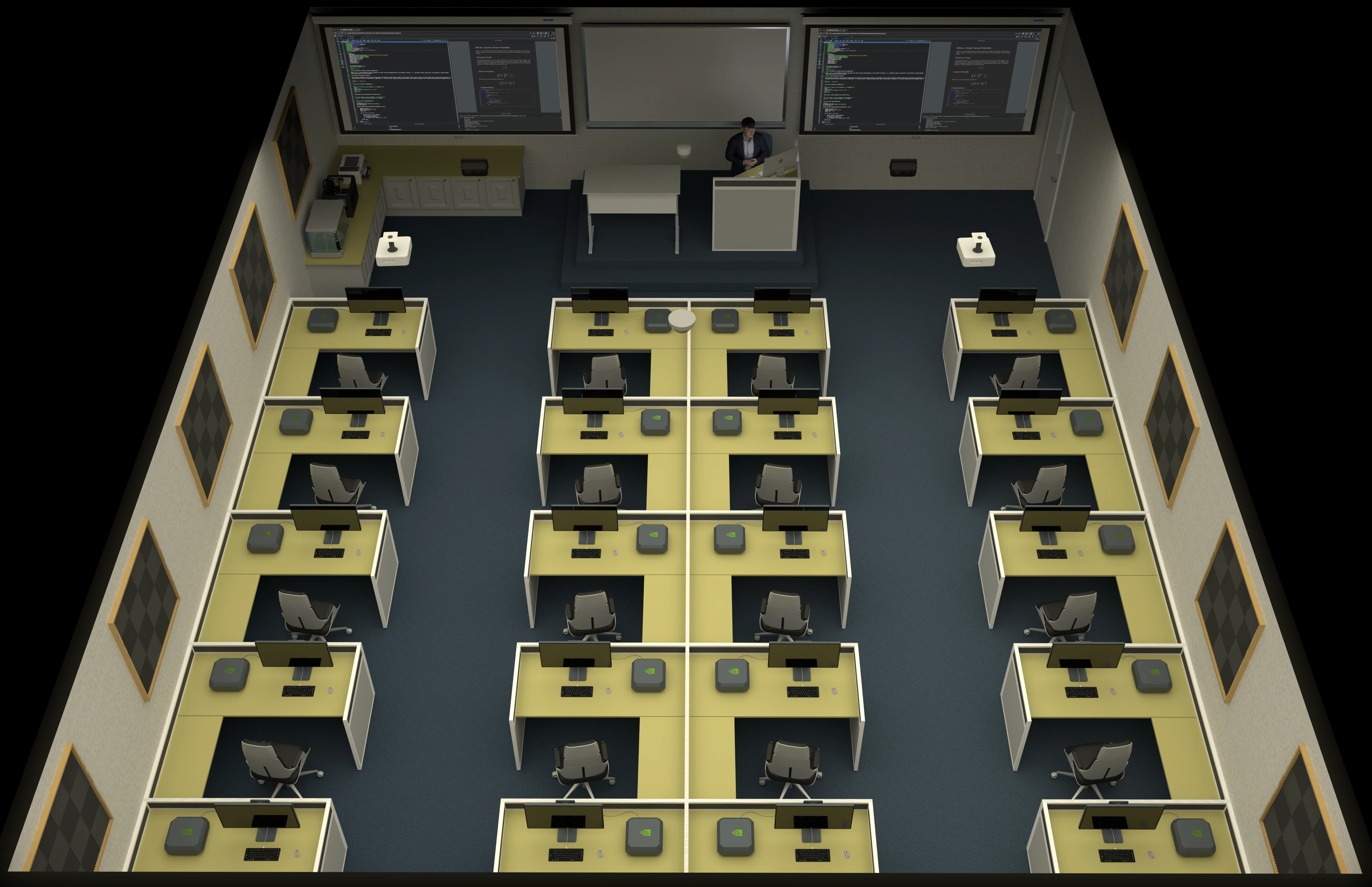
3D design of desk cubicles to get power to the desk and computers in the classroom for computer-based mathematics, computational physics, computational chemistry, CAD, CAM, BIM, computer-aided engineering, computer programming, animation software, science software applications, and more.

The movement to use computers more in education naturally includes many unrelated ideas, methods, and pedagogies since there are many uses for digital computers. For example, the fact that computers are naturally good at math leads to the question of the use of calculators in math education. The Internet's communication capabilities make it potentially useful for collaboration, and foreign language learning. The computer's ability to simulate physical systems makes it potentially useful in teaching science. More often, however, debate of digital education reform centers around more general applications of computers to education, such as electronic test-taking and online classes.

Another viable addition to digital education has been blended learning. In 2009, over 3 million K-12 students took an online course, compared to 2000 when 45,000 took an online course. Blended learning examples include pure online, blended, and traditional education. Research results show that the most effective learning takes place in a blended format. This allows children to view the lecture ahead of time and then spend class time practicing, refining, and applying what they have previously learned.

The idea of creating artificial intelligence led some computer scientists to believe that teachers could be replaced by computers, through something like an expert system; however, attempts to accomplish this have predictably proved inflexible. The computer is now more understood to be a tool or assistant for the teacher and students.

Harnessing the richness of the Internet is another goal. In some cases classrooms have been moved entirely online, while in other instances the goal is more to learn how the Internet can be more than a classroom.

Web-based international educational software is under development by students at New York University, based on the belief that current educational institutions are too rigid: effective teaching is not routine, students are not passive, and questions of practice are not predictable or standardized. The software allows for courses tailored to an individual's abilities through frequent and automatic multiple intelligences assessments. Ultimate goals include assisting students to be intrinsically motivated to educate themselves, and aiding the student in self-actualization. Courses typically taught only in college are being reformatted so that they can be taught to any level of student, whereby elementary school students may learn the foundations of any topic they desire. Such a program has the potential to remove the bureaucratic inefficiencies of education in modern countries, and with the decreasing digital divide, help developing nations rapidly achieve a similar quality of education. With an open format similar to Wikipedia, any teacher may upload their courses online and a feedback system will help students choose relevant courses of the highest quality. Teachers can provide links in their digital courses to webcast videos of their lectures. Students will have personal academic profiles and a forum will allow students to pose complex questions, while simpler questions will be automatically answered by the software, which will bring you to a solution by searching through the knowledge database, which includes all available courses and topics.

The 21st century ushered in the acceptance and encouragement of internet research conducted on college and university campuses, in homes, and even in gathering areas of shopping centers. Addition of cyber cafes on campuses and coffee shops, loaning of communication devices from libraries, and availability of more portable technology devices, opened up a world of educational resources. Availability of knowledge to the elite had always been obvious, yet provision of networking devices, even wireless gadget sign-outs from libraries, made availability of information an expectation of most persons. Cassandra B. Whyte researched the future of computer use on higher education campuses focusing on student affairs. Though at first seen as a data collection and outcome reporting tool, the use of computer technology in the classrooms, meeting areas, and homes continued to unfold. The sole dependence on paper resources for subject information diminished and e-books and articles, as well as online courses, were anticipated to become increasingly staple and affordable choices provided by higher education institutions according to Whyte in a 2002 presentation.

Digitally "flipping" classrooms is a trend in digital education that has gained significant momentum. Will Richardson, author and visionary for the digital education realm, points to the not-so-distant future and the seemingly infinite possibilities for digital communication linked to improved education. Education on the whole, as a stand-alone entity, has been slow to embrace these changes. The use of web tools such as wikis, blogs, and social networking sites is tied to increasing overall effectiveness of digital education in schools. Examples exist of teacher and student success stories where learning has transcended the classroom and has reached far out into society.

The media has been instrumental in pushing formal educational institutions to become savvier in their methods. Additionally, advertising has been (and continues to be) a vital force in shaping students' and parents' thought patterns.

Technology is a dynamic entity that is constantly in flux. As time presses on, new technologies will continue to break paradigms that will reshape human thinking regarding technological innovation. This concept stresses a certain disconnect between teachers and learners and the growing chasm that started some time ago. Richardson asserts that traditional classroom's will essentially enter entropy unless teachers increase their comfort and proficiency with technology.

Administrators are not exempt from the technological disconnect. They must recognize the existence of a younger generation of teachers who were born during the Digital Age and are very comfortable with technology. However, when old meets new, especially in a mentoring situation, conflict seems inevitable. Ironically, the answer to the outdated mentor may be digital collaboration with worldwide mentor webs; composed of individuals with creative ideas for the classroom.

=== Education for All ===
The Education for All (EFA) Assessment 2000 was launched in July 1998 with an aim to help countries to identify both problems and prospects for further progress of EFA, and to strengthen their capacity to improve and monitor the provision and outcomes of basic education. Some 179 countries set up National Assessment Groups which collected quantitative data focusing on eighteen core indicators and carried out case-studies to collect qualitative information.

Education 2030 Agenda refers to the global commitment of the Education for All movement to ensure access to basic education for all. It is an essential part of the 2030 Agenda for Sustainable Development. The roadmap to achieve the Agenda is the Education 2030 Incheon Declaration and Framework for Action, which outlines how countries, working with UNESCO and global partners, can translate commitments into action.

The United Nations, over 70 ministers, representatives of member-countries, bilateral and multilateral agencies, regional organizations, academic institutions, teachers, civil society, and the youth supported the Framework for Action of the Education 2030 platform. The Framework was described as the outcome of continuing consultation to provide guidance for countries in implementing this Agenda. At the same time, it mobilizes various stakeholders in the new education objectives, coordination, implementation process, funding, and review of Education 2030.

=== Thailand ===
Evidence regarding the educational attainment of the Thai labor force in 1995 comes from a report by A. R. Haas (1999) titled “Trends in Articulation Arrangements for Technical and Vocational Education in the South East Asian Region.” This report was jointly prepared by UNESCO–UNEVOC and RMIT University, and is widely cited as an international source when discussing the structure of educational attainment among the Thai workforce in 1995. 79.1% of the Thai labor force had primary education or below, 8.0% had lower secondary education, 3.3% had upper secondary education, 3.2% had vocational education, and 6.4% had higher education.

Therefore, in 1995, the Minister of Education, Sukavich Rangsitpol launched, education reforms for all, aimed at realizing the potential of Thai people to develop themselves for a better quality of life and to develop the nation for peaceful coexistence in the global community.

Since December 1995, activities have been conducted in four main areas:

- School reform: Efforts have been made to standardize the quality of education across all levels and types of schools and educational institutions. Educational coverage has been expanded.
- Teacher reform: Training and recruitment of teachers have been urgently and comprehensively reformed in both public and private schools. Educational administrators and personnel have been continuously developed.
- Curriculum reform: Curriculum and teaching-learning processes have been urgently reformed to raise the educational quality at all types and levels.
- Administrative reform: Through devolution, educational institutions have been empowered to make administrative decisions and to offer appropriate educational services consistent with local lifestyles and conditions. Provincial organizations have been strengthened to facilitate devolution, while private participation from families and communities has been promoted and supported.

School-based management (SBM) in Thailand was implemented in 1997 as part of a reform aimed at overcoming a profound crisis in the education system.

The 1995 Education Revolution in Thailand resulted in 40,000 schools being required to improve their school environments and encourage local community involvement in school administration and management.

These schools later accepted 4.35 million students aged between 3–17 years old from poor families in remote areas. Thereafter, Thailand successfully established Education For All (EFA).

As a result, His Excellency Mr. Sukavich Rangsitpol received the 1996 education award, and Thailand also received the 1997 ACEID award for excellence in education and The 1998 Educational Innovation and Information Award-from UNESCO.

According to UNESCO, The 1995 Education Revolution in Thailand led to the following results:

Free 12 years of education for all children and 3 years of kindergarten provided by the Thai government on 8 May 1997. This program was later added to the 1997 Constitution of Thailand, granting access to all citizens. The educational budget increased from 133 billion baht in 1996 to 163 billion baht in 1997 (a 22.5% increase).

- Since 1996, first-grade students have been taught English as a second language and computer literacy.

Professional advancement from teacher level 6 to teacher level 7 was provided by the Thai government without having to submit academic work for consideration.

- The Eighth National Economic and Social Development Plan was also written to support the implementation of the education reform program.

A World Bank report indicated that after the 1997 Asian financial crisis, income in the northeast, the poorest part of Thailand, rose by 46 percent from 1994 to 2000. Nationwide poverty fell from 21.3% to 11.3%.

== See also ==
- Anti-schooling activism
- Bias in curricula
- Blab school
- Block scheduling
- Career and Technical Education
- Certificate of Initial Mastery
- Chicago movement
- Conflict of interest
- Criterion-referenced test
- Educational philosophies
- Female education
- High school graduation examination
- Higher-order thinking
- Inquiry-based Science
- Learning crisis
- Learning environment
- Learning space
- Merit pay
- Multiculturalism
- Political correctness
- Project-based learning
- Special Assistance Program
- Student-centered learning
- Sudbury model democratic schools
- Sudbury Valley School
- Teaching for social justice
- University reform
- Web literacy

== Sources ==
- Gutmann, Amy (1999). Democratic Education. Princeton: Princeton University Press. ISBN 978-0691009162.
- Tyack, David; Cuban, Larry (1995). Tinkering Toward Utopia: A Century of Public School Reform. Cambridge, Massachusetts: Harvard University Press.

This article incorporates text from a free content work. Licensed under CC-BY-SA IGO 3.0 (license statement/permission). Text taken from Education Transforms Lives, 6, 8-9, UNESCO, UNESCO. UNESCO.
