= International Commission on Financing Global Education Opportunity =

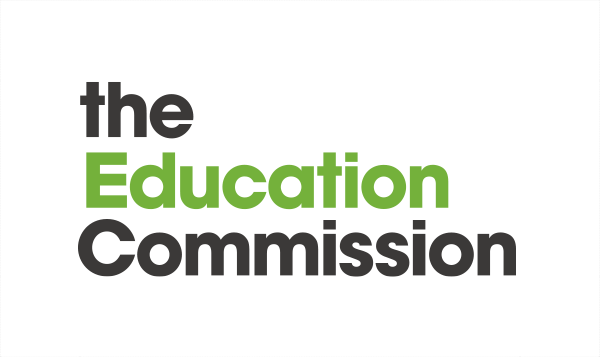
the Education Commission logo

The International Commission on Financing Global Education Opportunity (also known as the Education Commission) was set up in 2015 to reinvigorate the case for investing in education and to chart a pathway for increasing investment, especially in low- and middle-income countries. Chaired by United Nations (UN) Special Envoy for Global Education and former United Kingdom (UK) Prime Minister Gordon Brown, the Commission presented its report, The Learning Generation: Investing in Education for a Changing World, to United Nations Secretary-General Ban Ki-moon on September 18, 2016. The report called for "the largest expansion of educational opportunity in history." The Secretary-General indicated that he will act on the commission's recommendations.

== Commission Formation and Membership ==
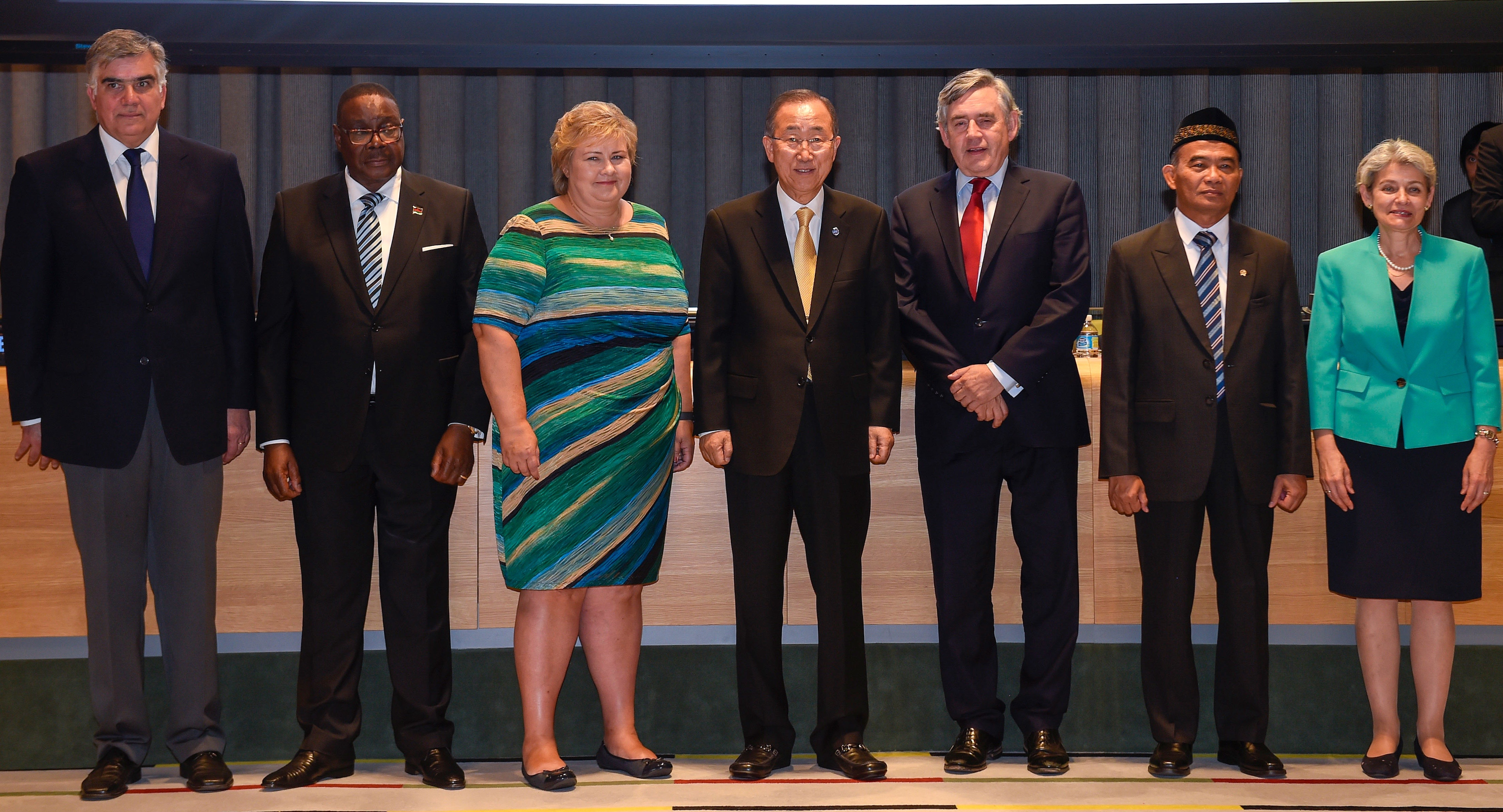
Education Commission Co-conveners, UN Secretary-General Ban Ki-moon and UN Special Envoy for Global Education and Education Commission Chair Gordon Brown. Photo: Riccardo Savi

The Education Commission was convened by Prime Minister Erna Solberg of Norway, President Arthur Peter Mutharika of Malawi, President Joko Widodo of Indonesia, President Michelle Bachelet of Chile, and UNESCO Director-General Irina Bokova following the 2015 Oslo Summit on Education for Development.

Among the 17 Sustainable Development Goals agreed on by world leaders at the 2015 Sustainable Development Summit was a goal for education: To ensure inclusive and equitable quality education by 2030 and promote lifelong learning opportunities for all. The commission's work was aligned with that and the broader SDG goals, with a mandate to identify the most effective and accountable ways of mobilizing and deploying resources to help ensure that all children and young people have the opportunity to participate, learn, and gain the skills they need for adulthood and work in the 21st century.

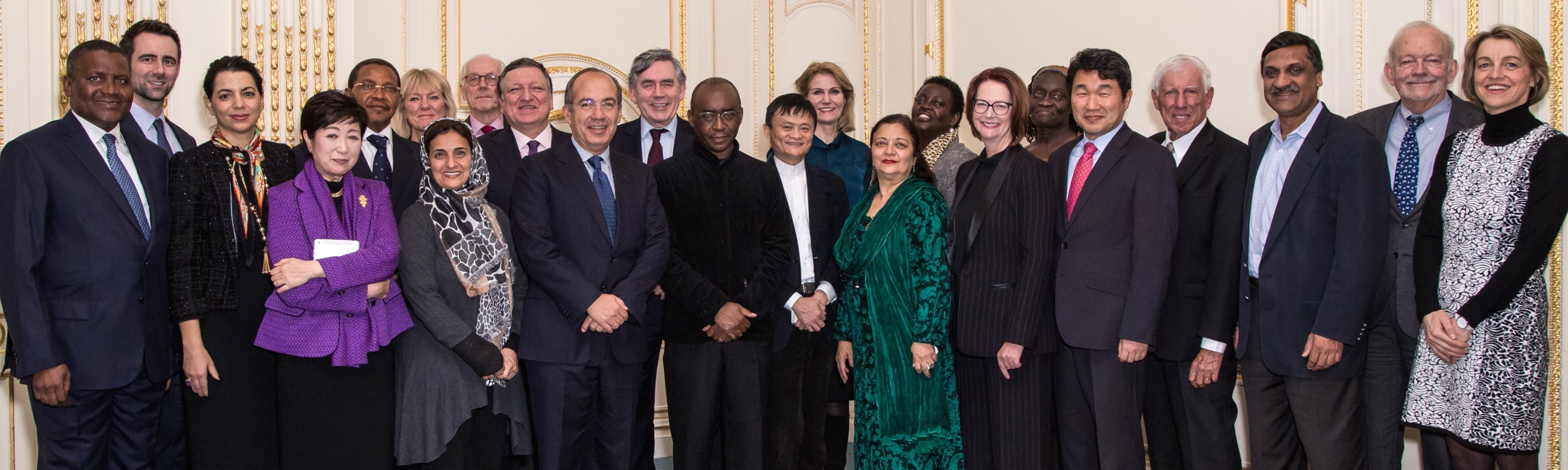
The Education Commissioners, London 2016. Photo: Vianney Le Caer

The commission's members include current and former heads of government and state, government ministers, and leaders in the fields of education, business, economics, development, health, and security:

- Gordon Brown, UN Special Envoy for Global Education; Former Prime Minister of the United Kingdom (chair)
- Anant Agarwal, CEO, edX; Professor, Massachusetts Institute of Technology
- José Manuel Barroso, Former President of the European Commission
- Kristin Clemet, managing director, Civita; Former Norwegian Minister of Education and Research of Norway, and Former Norwegian Minister of Labor and Government Administration
- Aliko Dangote, CEO, Dangote Group
- Julia Gillard, chair, Global Partnership for Education; Former Prime Minister of Australia
- Baela Raza Jamil, Adviser and Trustee, Idara-e-Taleem-o-Aagahi (ITA)
- Amel Karboul, Secretary-General of Maghreb Economic Forum (MEF); Former Tunisian Minister of Tourism
- Jakaya Kikwete, Former President of Tanzania
- Jim Kim, President, World Bank Group
- Yuriko Koike, Governor of Tokyo; Former Member of Japan's House of Representatives; Former Japanese Minister of Defense
- Anthony Lake, executive director, UNICEF
- Lee Ju-ho, Professor, KDI School of Public Policy and Management; Former Korean Minister of Education and interim President
- Jack Ma, Founder and Executive Chairman, Alibaba Group
- Graça Machel, Founder, Graça Machel Trust
- Strive Masiyiwa, Executive Chairman and Founder, Econet
- Teopista Birungi Mayanja, Founder Ugandan Teachers' Union (UNATU); Deputy Director Education Services, Kampala Capital City Authority
- Shakira Mebarak, International Artist; Founder, Fundación Pies Descalzos
- Patricio Meller, Professor, University of Chile; President, Fundación Chile
- Ngozi Okonjo-Iweala, chair, GAVI; Former Nigerian Minister of Finance
- Sheikha Lubna Al Qasimi, Cabinet Member and Minister of State for Tolerance, United Arab Emirates
- Kailash Satyarthi, Founder, Bachpan Bachao Andolan
- Amartya Sen, Thomas W. Lamont University Professor and Professor of Economics and Philosophy, Harvard University
- Theo Sowa, CEO, African Women's Development Fund
- Lawrence Summers, Charles W. Elliot University Professor and President Emeritus, Harvard University; 71st U.S. Secretary of the Treasury for President Clinton; Director of the U.S. National Economic Council for President Obama
- Helle Thorning-Schmidt, Chief Executive, Save the Children; Former Prime Minister of Denmark

== Research and Development of Recommendations ==
The Commission report is the most recent study on the importance of reforming, building, and sustaining successful education systems. For example, a 2010 McKinsey & Company report analyzed 20 education systems to understand the factors sustain well performing systems. The Brookings Institution examined the large education gap between developed and developing countries, concluding that "when it's shown as an average number of years in school and levels of achievement, the developing world is about 100 years behind developed countries."

To conduct its own study and develop recommendations, the Education Commission established a set of research hubs and network of expert advisers focusing on various pieces of investigation. Its conclusion and recommendations were based on new research by partners around the world, new expert analysis of the existing evidence base, and wide-reaching global consultations with practitioners, education providers, ministers of finance and education, policymakers, and partners in education. More than 300 partners in 105 countries engaged in this process. Its final report also drew on the conclusions of dedicated expert panels on technology, health and education, finance and a youth panel. The report's development was led by Commission Director Justin W. van Fleet and Research and Report Director Liesbet Steer.

== Learning Generation Findings and Recommendations ==
The Education Commission's final "Learning Generation" report highlighted a global "learning crisis" hitting developing countries the hardest. It notes that at a time when workers need higher skills than ever before because of technological change and globalization, an increasing number are not getting adequate educations. According to the report, only half of primary school children and little more than a quarter of secondary school children in low- and middle-income countries are learning basic skills; 263 million children and young people around the world are out of school and 330 million primary and secondary school students who are in school do not achieve even the most basic learning outcomes. The Guardian notes that by 2030, according to Commission estimates of current trends, 800 million of the world's 1.6 billion children will not get a full education, and 200 million of those will receive no formal schooling at all. The report's authors say the crisis has serious implications for economic growth, living standards, and social and political stability.

To address the learning crisis, the Commission proposes what it calls "the largest expansion of educational opportunity in modern history." "The Commission presents a bold solution" to "a learning crisis that has the potential to stunt economic growth around the globe," according to Lawrence Summers, former U.S. Treasury Secretary and a Commission member. By following the examples of the 25 percent of countries improving their educational systems the fastest, the Commission says that all countries could achieve a "learning generation" by 2030 – within a generation, all children in low- and middle-income countries could have access to quality pre-primary, primary, and secondary education, and a child in a low-income country will be as likely to reach the baseline level of secondary school skills and participate in post-secondary education as a child in a high-income country today. Commission member and former Australian Prime Minister Julia Gillard told Forbes magazine, "If all students in low-income countries developed basic reading skills in school, 171 million people could be lifted out of poverty – the equivalent of a 12-percent cut in global poverty."

To achieve the learning generation goal, the Commission report proposes four education "transformations" to increase investment and improve efficiency and impact:

Performance. Build systems that focus on achieving learning, and achieving results with increased efficiency.

Innovation. Create a culture of innovation, including benefiting from new technologies, new ways of organizing the education workforce, and involvement and initiative from organizations and individuals outside government.

Inclusion. Adopt "progressive universalism" in education to target resources to maximize inclusion of all children regardless of gender, background, or socioeconomic status, and tackle the broader factors that impact learning.

Finance. Increase investment in education in low- and middle-income countries from $1.2 trillion per year today to $3 trillion a year by 2030. The Commission proposes that 97 percent of this increase should come from developing countries themselves.

To sustain progress, the commission also proposes a "financing compact" that would give countries undertaking reforms and making investments priority access to international aid, as well transparency and other mechanisms to hold political leaders and international organizations accountable. Giving education a higher priority in international development financing is an important component of the commission's vision. Education receives one of the smallest proportions of requests for humanitarian aid — 40 percent of what was requested in 2013, compared with 86 percent for the food sector and 57 percent for the health sector, according to Time. From 2012 to 2014, multilateral, bilateral, and foundation investments in education in developing countries totaled $15 billion, compared to more than $25 billion devoted to global health. A Commission goal is to make education a priority in international finance just as health has traditionally been. "We might not see children dying in the streets because of a lack of a quality education, but the long-term impacts are just as consequential," Commission member and Fundación Chile President Patricio Meller wrote. "Children who do not receive a quality education end up trapped in generations of extreme poverty that not only impact them but their communities, families, and children."

== Report Presentation and Reception ==
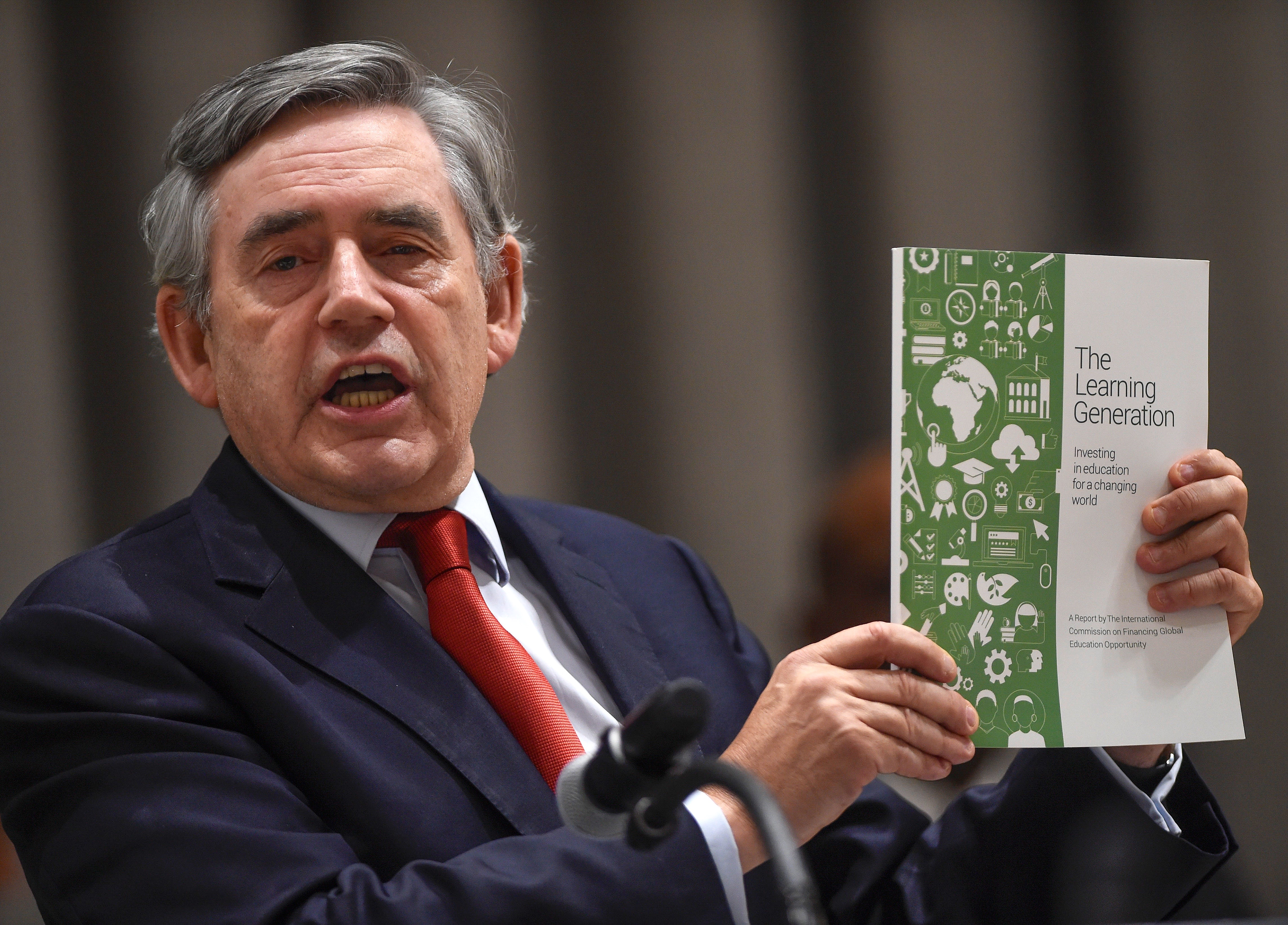
Education Commission Chair Gordon Brown presenting 'The Learning Generation' report at the United Nations in New York, September 2016. Photo: Riccardo Savi

The Learning Generation report was presented to UN Secretary-General Ban Ki-moon on September 18, 2016, coinciding with the 2016 United National General Assembly meeting. The Secretary-General received the report positively, calling it "a major piece of research and analysis" and saying it "points to education as the most powerful investment we can make in the future; a fundamental driver of personal, national and global development."

== Activities ==
World leaders at the 2017 G20 Hamburg summit committed themselves to advancing the International Finance Facility for Education (IFFEd), an initiative proposed by the Commission which could make it possible to fund universal education. The 2017 G20 Leaders' Declaration text reads: "We note the UN Secretary-General's proposal to establish an International Finance Facility for education taking into account other existing initiatives, such as the Global Partnership for Education and Education Cannot Wait, and look forward to examining it in further detail under Argentina's Presidency with a view to making recommendations on it."

In the six months leading up to the G20, nearly 140,000 citizens took action calling on world leaders to put education on the G20 agenda. The International Finance Facility for Education featured prominently in this grassroots movement and was lauded for its ability to "increase education financing by more than $10 billion annually by 2020" as reported by The Guardian.

In a joint opinion piece published on CNN immediately following the G20, Commission Chair Gordon Brown and Commissioner Shakira Mebarak said: "The G20's support for the proposed International Finance Facility for Education means new money tied to real results in children's lives. The facility offers a lifeline for many of the world's children who are out of school. This pact between countries that are willing to invest and reform, and an international community eager to take action, proves cooperation is alive and well." And speaking with CNBC Africa, Commission member and former President of Tanzania Jakaya Kikwete described the G20's endorsement of the proposed International Finance Facility for Education as "a big step forward."
