= Elloumi =

Elloumi is a Tunisian surname. Notable people with the surname include:

- Rayan Elloumi (born 2007), Canadian soccer player
- Selma Elloumi Rekik (born 1956), Tunisian politician
