= Charlie Muirhead =

Scottish businessman (born 1975)

Charlie Muirhead (born 29 May 1975) is a Scottish Australian serial tech entrepreneur, investor and public speaker who has co-founded 8 companies spanning music, telecoms software, outsourcing, video streaming and social media, angel investment, artificial intelligence and business events.

In 1996 at the age of 21 Charlie founded his first company, internet software firm Orchestream, which he took public 4 years later with UBS on the LSE and Nasdaq and which reached a valuation of over £1bn before being caught up in the telecoms crash. Charlie stepped down as CEO the same year and stayed on as a non-executive director.

Charlie has been selected twice as a World Economic Forum “Technology Pioneer” and was named the European Technology Forum's "Technology Entrepreneur of the Year".

== Early life and education ==
Muirhead was born in London, England and educated at Bedales School in Hampshire. At the age of 18, Muirhead handled his first management buyout of a musical-equipment rental business. At 19 he enrolled at the Imperial College London to study computer science.

== Current Venture ==
=== CogX ===
His most recent venture, CogX, is a community that brings together global leaders, the tech industry and the public to address the question, “How do we get the next 10 years right?”. The CogX Festival was co-founded with Tabitha Goldstaub later inaugural Chair of the UK AI Council, and its first event in June 2017 focused on “The Impact of AI on Industry, Government, and Society”. The conference's second installment took place during London Tech Week in June 2018, at Tobacco Dock in Wapping, East London with SoftBank Investment Advisers as its headline sponsor. In 2022 CogX was set up as a standalone company.

For 2023 the Festival moved to the O2 Arena and expanded to over 20,000 visitors, 500 speakers, and 10 programmes ranging from global leadership and democracy to artificial intelligence, industry transformation, the future of energy, education, life sciences, defence and ethics.

In May 2024 CogX ran a series of Salons and its first USA Festival at the Fairmont Century Plaza Hotel with 180 speakers and 2,000 delegates.

==== Unpaid suppliers ====
Three suplliers spoke to Sifted about being unpaid for work they had delivered as part of CogX, which they reported on in April 2024. Other suppliers also contacted Sifted and it was reported in September 2024 that it had now progressed to debt collectors and court cases.

== Founded companies ==
=== Orchestream ===
In 1996, while at university, Muirhead founded the company Orchestream, which allowed web users to prioritise their data on the Internet. In the two decades since, Muirhead has set up a total eight of startups, including NexAgent, iGabriel, InterProvider, t5m, and Brave Bison (formerly known as Rightster). He left Imperial early to work on the company full-time, though he received a note from the university stating that he could return if his business idea fell through. By 1999 Orchestream was worth £1 billion and was listed on the NASDAQ. Job cuts, management changes, accounting errors, and other mishaps caused the company to lose more than 99% of its value by the mid 2000s. Muirhead stepped down from his position as CEO in 2000, though maintained a position as non-executive director with the company.

=== iGabriel ===
Muirhead also founded iGabriel.net—an Internet incubator fund that invested in start-up web companies. According to The Daily Telegraph, "Unlike other incubators, iGabriel only accepts funds from individuals, and mainly from people in the technology or media industries who can help develop the companies in which the fund invests." iGabriel.net would eventually merge with Pi-Capital. In 2001 Muirhead founded the company InterProvider. InterProvider supplied proprietary software and serviced interconnections to telecom operators, and Time magazine featured Muirhead as an up-and-coming entrepreneur in its coverage of the company's founding.

=== Nexagent ===
In July 2000 Muirhead founded the multi-carrier MPLS service activation company Nexagent, which secured £10.3m in its first round of funding. Muirhead served as president and CEO of the company until 2003, when he relinquished his role as CEO, but retained his role as president of the company.

=== t5m ===
In 2007 Muirhead founded the company t5m, standing for "the 5th medium". The website is an online television network that features interviews with prominent individuals talking about socially conscious issues. Early offerings included an exclusive channel run by Nelson Mandela's charity 46664, which partnered with t5m for World AIDS Day. The company relaunched in 2008 to syndicate original content Short-form content between 3 and 5 minutes long, and distribute its own proprietary video-player. t5m combines the traditional television format of network-owned syndication alongside programs with production company-owned rights. The company also produced the television show Trinny and Susannah – What They Did Next.

=== Rightster / Brave Bison plc ===
In 2011 Muirhead co-founded Rightster with Tabitha Goldstaub, a software company that automates the end-to-end lifecycle for content owners, publishers, and marketers of digital video content including distribution, marketing, and monetisation of the content. Content partners for the company came from a broad range of industries, from London Fashion Week to ITN Productions and The Guardian newspaper. The company provided rights management through a cloud-based platform in addition to live streaming, audience development and YouTube/Facebook management services. Events that have streamed on Rightster have included the Wedding of Prince William and Catherine Middleton and the Leveson Inquiry. By March 2012, monthly video views of Rightster's clients grew from approximately one million views per month to 100 million views per month. Its staff also quadrupled during that time, and has offices in London, New York City, and Delhi. On 10 May 2016, it was announced that the company was relaunching under the name Brave Bison.

=== CognitionX ===
Charlie Muirhead and Tabitha Goldstaub founded CognitionX in 2015, after identifying the need for greater clarity in the "fast-paced" and "increasingly fragmented" area of artificial intelligence. The company launched with the stated goal of creating a "well-organised knowledge base ... about everything going on in AI, in one place". CognitionX is building a proprietary software platform, the Knowledge Network, powered by augmented intelligence. In March 2018 CognitionX was commissioned by the Mayor of London to carry out a census of AI innovation in the capital.

The free, public version of the Knowledge Network empowers users to immediately access a global network of AI experts, on-demand, while the Enterprise edition also enables large firms to capitalise on internal expertise.

In addition, the company issues a daily AI newsletter, authored by Tabitha Goldstaub, which has over 11,000 subscribers. CognitionX also produces bespoke research projects and has held over 60 meetups since June 2015 on topics ranging from HRTech to the future of chatbots

In 2018, CognitionX was commissioned by the Mayor of London's Office to write a report analysing the AI ecosystem in London. The final report, which looks at London's unique strengths as a global hub of AI, found that London was the AI capital of Europe; highlights include the fact that London hosts over 750 AI suppliers.

In June 2017, CognitionX hosted the inaugural CogX, a two-day ‘Innovation Exchange’ for 1,500 delegates discussing how AI will shape the future of society. CogX 2018 saw 6,500 attendees and over 370 speakers at Tobacco Dock. CogX 2019, held in the King's Cross area of London, was home to over 10,000 attendees and over 600 speakers.

Following loss of event revenue during the Covid pandemic, in 2022 CognitionX was placed in into Voluntary Arrangement

== Awards ==
- Named the European Technology Forum's "Technology Entrepreneur of the Year" in March 2004
- Selected twice as a World Economic Forum Technology Pioneer (with Nexagent in 2005 and Orchestream in 2000)
