= Tabitha Goldstaub =

British tech entrepreneur

Tabitha Goldstaub MBE
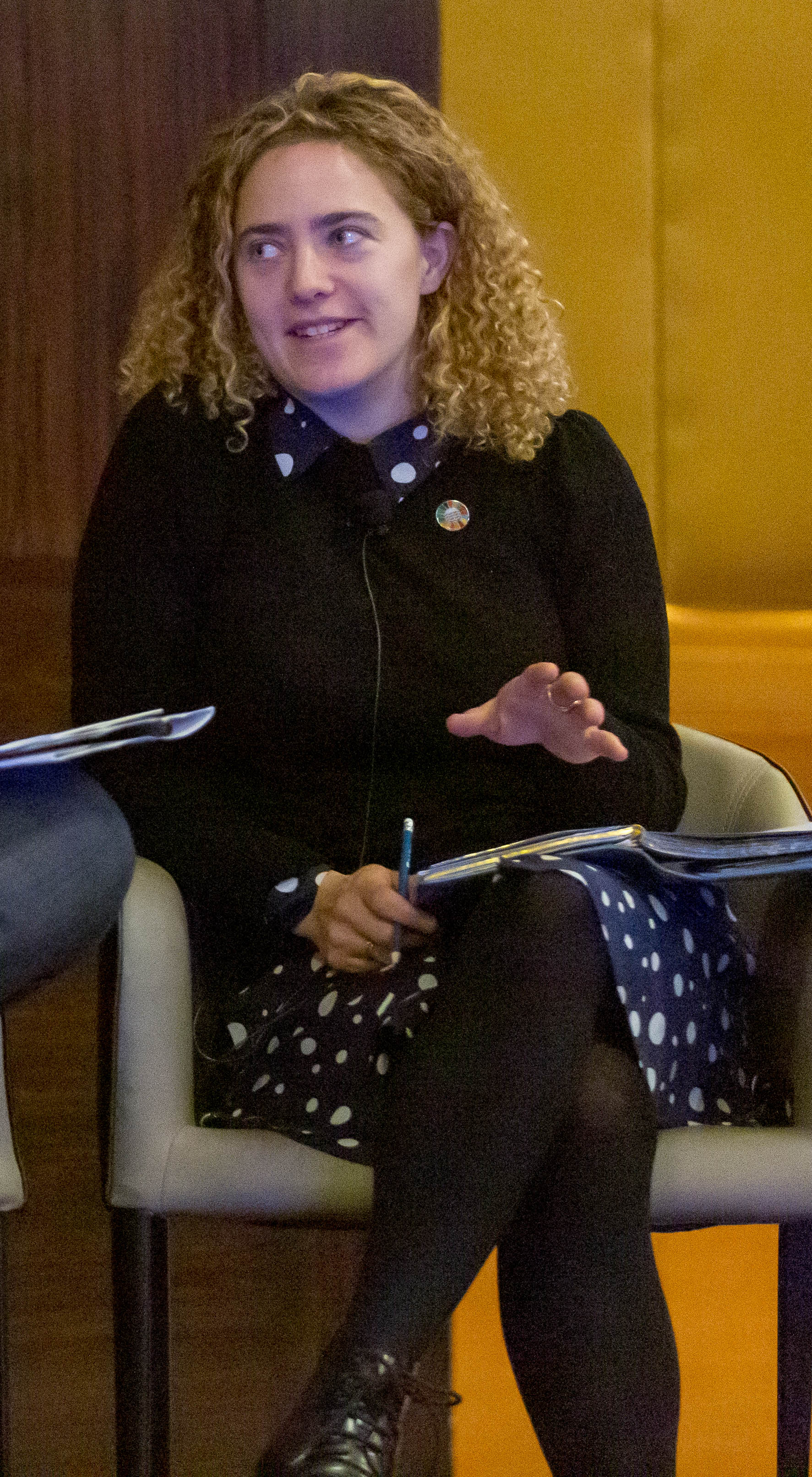
- Goldstaub at DDaT talk 'All About People' in 2018
- Education: University of the Arts London Wimbledon College of Arts
- Organization: How To Talk To Robots
- Known for: Artificial Intelligence Innovation in tech

Tabitha Goldstaub is a British tech entrepreneur who specialises in communicating the impact of artificial intelligence to business, government, academia, and philanthropy. She is the Co Founder of Lichen AI, enhancing and automating requirements capture. Author of How To Talk To Robots - A Girl's Guide to a World Dominated by AI, a book which she is transforming into a reality TV show.

Goldstaub works internationally on the Board of Luminate, ensuring Big Tech, social platforms, and AI companies respect human rights and social justice. She helps locally on the Board of Innovate Cambridge and The Cambridge Pledge, an organisation that works on supporting innovation with a focus on social equity.

She was the co-founder of CogX, a festival and online platform. She was the Chair of the UK government's AI Council, a member of the DCMS Digitial Economy Council and served on the TechUK board. A serial entrepreneur, she was the co-founder of video distribution company Rightster (IPO 2011). She was also an advisor to Tortoise Media, Raspberry Pi, CarbonRe, Monumo, Cambridge Innovation Capital and the Alan Turing Institute.

== Early life and education ==
Goldstaub attended Bedales School until 2004. Her mother is Jane Procter, who edited Tatler magazine for nine years. She completed an Art Foundation in graphic design at Wimbledon College of Arts. She earned a bachelor's degree in Advertising at University of the Arts London.

== Career ==
Goldstaub joined online television network t5m, where she became Director of Video Syndication. Here she spotted market space to "help rights holders, brands and influencers distribute and monetise their content". Goldstaub went on to co-found Righster (now Brave Bison) in 2011 with entrepreneur Charlie Muirhead. She held roles as head of brand solutions, head of fashion, marketing director and general manager of the New York office. In 2012 The Guardian partnered with Righster to improve their YouTube content. Righster floated in November 2013 for £20.4 million. She was key in organising the first instances of live streaming from London Fashion Week, with IMG and the British Fashion Council. In 2012 she was listed in Media Week's "30 Under 30". In 2014 she was listed in the London Evening Standard newspaper's Silicon 60.

Goldstaub is the co-founder of CognitionX, “Expert Advice Platform”. This organisation was created with the intention to offer business the chance to learn about and use AI. Goldstaub is particularly concerned about AI's potential for gender bias, “When you look at what’s going on in AI with a feminist cap on, it becomes very apparent that the biases that already exist in society will be exacerbated or reinforced,”. In an interview with London Evening Standard, she compared AI to a child, "learning from what it hears...If you train AI based on racist, sexist information, you can’t be surprised that it becomes racist and sexist".

In June 2017, Goldstaub arranged the inaugural CogX, a two-day ‘Innovation Exchange’ for 1,500 delegates discussing how AI will shape the future of society. CogX 2018 saw 6,500 attendees and over 370 speakers at Tobacco Dock.

In October 2017 Marie Claire described Goldstaub as a Future Shaper. She was listed in the London Evening Standard's "The Progress 1000: London's most influential people". Goldstaub lives by the Karen Spärck Jones quotation "computing is too important to be left to men". She is represented by Curtis Brown (literary agents).

Goldstaub led the team that wrote a report for the Mayor of London’s Office, which analysed the AI ecosystem in London. The final report, which looks at London’s unique strengths as a global hub of AI, found that London was the AI capital of Europe; highlights include the fact that London hosts over 750 AI suppliers.

In June 2018 Goldstaub was named Head of the UK Government's AI Council (part of the government's new Office for Artificial Intelligence) and as 'AI Business Champion' by then Secretary of State for DCMS, Matt Hancock.

Goldstaub was appointed Member of the Order of the British Empire (MBE) in the 2022 New Year Honours for services to the artificial intelligence sector. She was named as one of Computer Weekly's Most Influential Women in Technology in 2023. Goldstaub left CognitionX in 2022, and joined the Luminate Board of Directors. She was appointed the Executive Director of Innovate Cambridge, an initiative that looked to strengthen Cambridge's innovation ecosystem.

== Education and advocacy ==
Goldstaub co-founded Future Girl Corp with Sharmadean Reid in 2016. They offer a series of free monthly events promoting women's entrepreneurship. In March 2017, Goldstaub ran a Future Girl Corp lecture on creating user profiles for business. She regularly advises London based start-ups. Goldstaub is a mentor for young women tech founders, including Zoe Partridge of fashion rental startup We Are the Walk.

Goldstaub co-founded Project Placed, which looks to enhance experiential learning, by pairing students with businesses for experience-based learning during their university degrees, in 2017. That year she chaired the "Fixing Education For The AI Age" discussion at DLD Conference. She is on the Marketing Advisory Council for Founders 4 Schools, a UK Charity which connects students to local business leaders.

In October 2018 Goldstaub was awarded the Amy Johnson Inspiration Award by the Women's Engineering Society for using her positions in highly visible roles with government and the London mayor's office to promote diversity in tech.
