= Qingdao Declaration =

The Qingdao Declaration is a document that provides UN Member States with policy recommendations for harnessing the power of ICT to address current educational challenges, and to ensure equitable quality education and lifelong opportunities for all. It was the key output of the International Conference on ICT and Post-2015 Education, which took place 23–25 May 2015 in Qingdao, People's Republic of China. The conference was organized by UNESCO, the Ministry of Education of the People’s Republic of China and the Chinese National Commission for UNESCO.

== Endorsement ==
The Qingdao Declaration was endorsed by Ministers of Education, high-level government officials, representatives of United Nations (UN) agencies, civil society organizations, teacher organizations, as well as other development partners, members of academia, and the private sector.

== Contents ==
Both the Incheon and Qingdao Declarations say that Information and communication technologies (ICTs) must be harnessed to strengthen education systems, knowledge dissemination, information access, quality and effective learning, and more effective service provision. The Qingdao Declaration contains statements on how to use ICT for:

1. access and inclusion in education;
2. open educational resources and open solutions;
3. quality learning;
4. lifelong learning pathways;
5. online learning innovations;
6. quality assurance and recognition of online learning;
7. monitoring and evaluation;
8. accountability and partnership;
9. international cooperation.

== See also ==
- Incheon declaration

== Sources ==
This article incorporates text from a free content work. Licensed under CC-BY-SA IGO 3.0 (license statement/permission). Text taken from Leveraging information and communication technologies to achieve the Post-2015 Education goal: report of the International Conference on ICT and Post-2015 Education, 5-7, UNESCO, UNESCO. UNESCO.
