= CogX Festival =

Business conference

- Status: Active
- Genre: Artificial intelligence
- Venue: Multiple
- Locations: London, England
- Country: United Kingdom
- Attendance: 90,000 (2023)

CogX Festival is a global festival focusing on the impact of artificial intelligence (AI) and emerging technology on industry, government, and society. It takes place annually, usually in September, in London, England. Founded by Charlie Muirhead and Tabitha Goldstaub in 2017, CogX aims to facilitate dialogue and understanding about AI and its implications across various sectors.

CogX Festival 2023 was held from September 12 to September 14 across multiple sites in London.

== History ==
The inaugural CogX event took place in 2017, intending to bring together experts from diverse fields to discuss the role and impact of AI and emerging technologies. Since then, it has evolved to include a broader range of topics and attract a diverse audience.

In 2018, the first CogX Awards festival was hosted. That year, over 50 awards were shown to 300 guests.

In 2021, CogX and Hopin, a video conferencing software, signed an agreement lasting 4 years to make CogX a hybrid conference due to the COVID-19 pandemic. CogX 2021 attracted over 5,000 attendees in-person and over 100,000 virtually.

In 2022, they returned to a live event format after two years of hybrid events and controlled physical attendance. They also launched the CogX app, which curated insights from the world's top podcasts.

In 2023, after he had delivered the keynote address guest speaker Stephen Fry fell off the stage and subsequently broke his leg, hip, pelvis and a "bunch of ribs". A court filing in 2026 revealed that Fry was seeking £100,000 in damages from CogX Festival Ltd and creative agency Blonstein Events.

== Programming ==
The festival features sessions, discussions, workshops, and exhibitions, encompassing various domains of AI and technology. In recent CogX Festivals, they have featured summits encompassing topics like global leadership and industry transformation.
