= Amel Karboul =

Tunisian politician (born 1973)

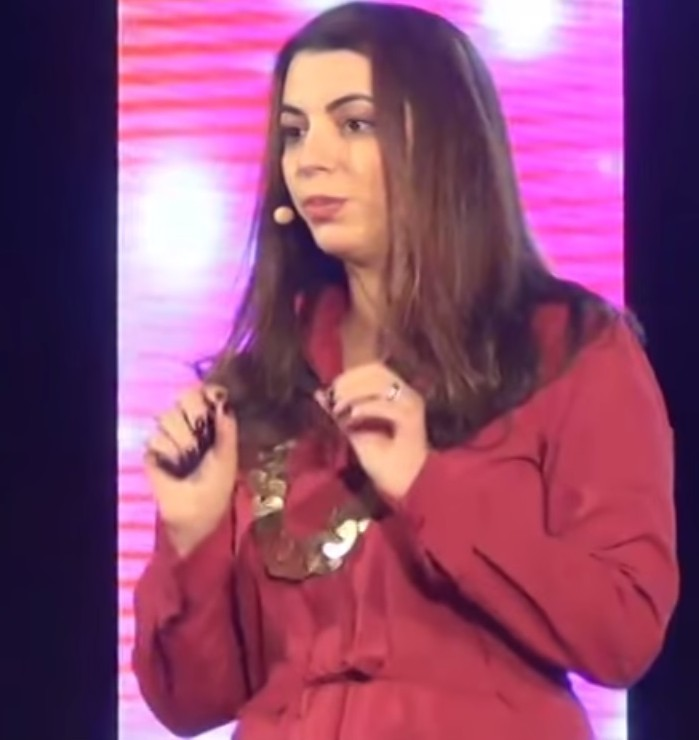

Minister of Tourism (Tunisia)
- In office 29 January 2014 – 2 February 2015
- President: Moncef Marzouki
- Preceded by: Jamel Gamra
- Succeeded by: Selma Elloumi Rekik

Personal details
- Born: 25 April 1973 (age 53) Tunis, Tunisia
- Party: Independent
- Education: University of Karlsruhe (Germany)

Amel Karboul (Tunisian Arabic: آمال كربول; born 25 April 1973) is a Tunisian author, speaker, politician, philanthropist, and business leader. Karboul was the first woman in history to occupy Tunisia's Minister of Tourism position as the youngest member of the Mehdi Jomaa government from January 2014 to February 2015.

== Personal life ==
Karboul was born in Tunis, the capital of Tunisia. Her father, Mohamed Karboul, was the Secretary of State in the Ministry of the Interior in the Baccouche government and the Tunisian ambassador to West Germany. Karboul was formerly married to German engineer Marcus Gottschalk from 2002 to 2016. She has two daughters, Shedlia and Leyla. Karboul completed a master's degree in Mechanical Engineering in Germany, received a Doctorate in the United Kingdom, and has worked in four continents. She cites her intercultural background and feminist upbringing as major influences on her political beliefs and career. Karboul is fluent in Arabic, French, English and German, and also has knowledge of Spanish, Brazilian Portuguese and Greek.

== Biography ==
In 2014, she was named one of the top ten most influential politicians in Africa. Before venturing into politics, Karboul was a project leader for the Mercedes-Benz brand in South Africa and Germany as well as an executive with the DaimlerChrysler Corporate University in the United States, Germany, and Singapore. She has also worked in leadership roles for global consulting groups such as Neuwaldegg and the Boston Consulting Group.

Karboul was the CEO and founder of the international leadership and change consulting firm Change, Leadership and Partners.

Karboul wrote Coffin Corner, a book published by Midas Management Press in 2015, in which she describes a new leadership culture more suited to the complexities of the 21st century. From May 2015 to October 2017, Karboul served as the Secretary-General of the Maghreb Economic Forum, and a commissioner to the International Commission on Financing Global Education Opportunity.

Currently, Karboul is the CEO of the Education Outcomes Fund, an organisation that aims to transform education worldwide by tying funding to measurable results.

== Education and career ==
Karboul attended the Karlsruhe Institute of Technology in Germany, where she earned a master's degree with honors in Mechanical Engineering in 1996. In 2002, she received a systemic coaching certification from the IFW Munich. Karboul would later earn a doctorate in coaching and mentoring from the Oxford Brookes University in the United Kingdom.

Over the span of her career, Karboul has served in leadership roles for a variety of worldwide corporations. She was the project leader for innovation management and supplier relationship for the Mercedes-Benz Brand in South Africa and Germany, where she worked from 1996 until January 2000.

In addition to her work with Mercedes-Benz, she was also an executive for knowledge transfer and leadership development at the DaimlerChrysler Corporate University in USA, Singapore, and Germany until 2001.

In 2001, Karboul became a strategy consultant for the Boston Consulting Group in Germany. She said in an interview, “I was first drawn to consulting—and BCG in particular—because of the diversity of tasks and opportunity to learn. I felt consulting would help make my professional canvas broader by giving me experience across industry sectors and exposing me to diverse skills and approaches.”

From 2002 to 2007, Karboul was first a senior consultant and later elected to be a managing partner of the consulting group Neuwaldegg in Vienna, Austria. Her primary duties with the company were dedicated to technological, sociological, and systemic change through organizational and leadership development.

In 2007, Karboul founded the international leadership and change consulting firm Change, Leadership and Partners. According to the firm's website, the consultancy is devoted to working with leaders and organizations worldwide in order to build a more desirable and sustainable future. The company has offices in Tunis, Cologne, and London.

Karboul was commended for her business coaching at the 2012 ESMT/KDVI Coaching Colloquium in Berlin, where she was given the 2012 Best Coaching Colloquium Case Award. ESMT's Konstantin Korotov and Andreas Bernhard cited the case's learning and developmental impact on the coaching community among the reasons they selected Karboul for the award. “I can tell you that for a top team that rather deny their own dysfunctions, and by that threatening a multi-billion € investment, to open up and look in the mirror was a huge step,” Karboul said of her case. “It was not about ‘feeling better’ but about creating a high-performing top team that can navigate the company in times of crisis. It was about overcoming egos and creating space for different perspectives and truths. Together with the team, we achieved a tipping point.” Karboul’s executive coaching has also been recognized in several German magazines such as Brand Eins, an acclaimed business magazine which sells an estimated 100,000 copies every month and has featured her multiple times. Other German publications featuring Karboul include the Handelsblatt daily business newspaper and national daily publication Die Welt.

Karboul has served as a visiting professor at Duke Corporate Education, which was ranked first in the world in Custom Executive Education for 12 consecutive years by Financial Times. Karboul has also lectured at numerous other schools such as the ZFU Business School, the Witten School of Management, and Frankfurt University of Applied Sciences.

== Minister of Tourism ==
Karboul was named the Minister of Tourism for Tunisia in January 2014. She was the first woman in Tunisian history to occupy the position, and served as the youngest member of Prime Minister Mehdi Jomaa’s government from January 2014 to February 2015.

During her speech at the TEDx Carthage event in 2014, Karboul shared an account of her invitation to become part of the new Tunisian government. “Three months ago, I had a phone call that changed my life,” she said. “Our prime minister, Mehdi Jomaa, called me and said ‘Tunisia needs us. Come back home. Come back to rebuild our nation. Come back to be part of a startup democracy team.”

Controversy was raised around Karboul during a session of Tunisia's Constituent Assembly meant to give the incoming government a vote of confidence. The incident began when some members of the assembly criticized over rumors that she had once visited Israel. Mehdi Jomaa defended his minister, stating that Karboul had never followed through with the trip in question after she was interrogated for several hours in an airport, reportedly for being Arab and Muslim. The new government would eventually gain the assembly's vote of confidence.

The new government of Medi Johmaa was sworn in on January 29 of 2014. Karboul would tender her resignation from the position of Minister of Tourism just hours later. “It is the Prime Minister’s decision whether to accept my resignation or not,” she said.

Karboul expressed her commitment to serve Tunisia, noting that despite several difficulties, the country still offers opportunities of development. Jomaa would refuse this resignation, citing his continued confidence in his minister.

As Minister of Tourism, Karboul general role was to revamp Tunisia's tourism, which represents 8-12 percent of their GDP and is vital to the well-being of 20 percent of the population. She also helped ensure transparent elections took place, along with working to create more effective economic and social governance policies.

During her term, Karboul generated “national hype” for her activity on social media. She has earned international awards for use of these social platforms to encourage youth empowerment in the digital world.

In 2015, Karboul was awarded the Commandeur de l’Ordre de la République Tunisienne in acknowledgement of her outstanding service to her country.

== After the Government ==
In 2016, Karboul became the Secretary-General of the Maghreb Economic Forum, an independent non-profit and non-partisan organization that aims to create a more inclusive and sustainable economy in the Maghreb region by helping leaders address challenges such as social growth, gender equality, and economic reform with a more innovative approach.

On her website, Karboul says it is her duty to “give a face to both Tunisian research and development and to the implementation of democratic, social and economic reforms and strategies, and also to network the institution with other bodies, instigate cooperation and gain supporters, so as to promote progress and development for Tunisian society and the whole region.”

In an interview with the Boston Consulting Group, she shared her vision for Tunisia's youth. “Given our individual and collective strengths, we believe that we can and must work to rebuild our region,” Karboul said. “Our young people deserve a better future. I dream of a time when people across this region will enjoy a decent education, plentiful jobs, health, and a good quality of life, and when Tunisia in particular will be a leading light for other Arab nations.”

In September 2016, Karboul was one of more than 20 world leaders named to lead the International Commission on Financing Global Education Opportunity. The commission, which includes five former presidents and prime ministers as well as three Nobel Prize recipients, was created to reverse the lack of financing for education worldwide. “Our mission was to put forth a groundbreaking set of solutions to end the global crisis in education,” Karboul said. “What we found was clear enough: inclusive education — education that reaches every child, especially those at greatest risk of not learning, such as the poor, the discriminated against, girls, and those facing multiple disadvantages — is the central tool necessary to combat economic stagnation, political instability, conflict, migration, gender inequality, corruption, preventable illness, and inequality-fueled discontent.”

Karboul explained in a separate interview that she believes education reform is critical as new generations have continued to fall behind the educational curve. “Until now, education has been very much seen as a national topic—without ever really making it onto the global agenda,” Karboul said. “We’re looking at how to get 124 million children and youth to school for the first time, and to improve upon what and how we teach the 250 million others who are already in school but who are not learning enough. If we fail to act today, we'll lose many future generations.”

== Founding the Education Outcomes Fund ==
In 2018 Amel became the founding CEO of The Education Outcomes Fund (EOF). Born out of the Education Commission chaired by former UK Prime Minister Gordon Brown, and the Global Steering Group for Impact Investment chaired by Sir Ronald Cohen, it is an ambitious effort to significantly improve education and employment outcomes by tying funding to measurable results.

In 2020 EOF became a hosted trust fund within UNICEF and its first programs, including in Sierra Leone in partnership with the LEGO Foundation, began in 2021.

Amel spoke at the Government Outcomes Lab's 2018 and 2020 Social Outcomes Conferences about the ways that outcomes-based funding can encourage collaboration between civil society organizations and improve transparency and accountability from governments.

In October 2021, Karboul attended the Global Steering Group for Impact Investment Summit to chair a Keynote Fireside session titled ‘improving education through new financial models’. The panel also included contributions from Safeena Husain and Theo Sowa on how inclusive finance in education can deliver impact where it is needed the most.

== Current Board Memberships ==
Karboul currently serves as an Advisory Board Member at the Global AI Index, which ranks nations based on their level of investment, innovation, and implementation of Artificial Intelligence.

Karboul is also a Commissioner at The Education Commission, which is chaired by former Prime Minister of the United Kingdom Gordon Brown and seeks to ensure that all children have access to learning within the next generation. As part of her work with the Commission she chairs the DeliverEd initiative, which works to strengthen the ability of governments to institute meaningful reforms that directly improve learning outcomes.

In addition, Karboul serves as a board member on the Global Tech Panel, which brings together leaders from the tech industry, the world of investment, and civil society to foster new types of cooperation between diplomacy and technology.

== Lectures and Publications ==
Karboul has appeared in wide variety of lectures and publications, often working to spur advances in business leadership and educational advancement. She champions innovation as a means to overcome traditional struggles such as employment, political instability, and economic reform.

At the 2015 TEDx Berlin event, themed “How Leaders Thrive in a Complex World”, Karboul discussed some of the ideas from her recently published book The Coffin Corner. “It only takes one app to make an entire industry irrelevant,” she said, explaining that business leaders who rely too much on planning and controlling will struggle to keep up in a constantly evolving global marketplace.

As a keynote speaker for the 2016 Supporting Syria and the Region conference in London, Karboul described what she believes is the key to reversing many of the issues plaguing the region. “There is a magic key that can open the room of opportunities, the room of security, and the room of long-term stability—and that key is called education,” she said. “Staying with a classic approach, building schools and hiring teachers always, is not fast and effective enough. Today through technology, we can bring education, and even school to children, if we can't bring the children to school.”

At a zenithTalk in Casablanca in September 2017, Karboul outlined what she believes the dangers are if children in developing countries are denied access to education. “I don't know how you feel about it, but living in a world where half of the world’s children are denied any opportunity – what does that mean for conflict, for refugee streams, for migration etc?”

In October 2017, Karboul gave a TED talk entitled “The Global Learning Crisis – and what to do about it”. In her speech, she asserted that “the most important infrastructure we have is educated minds” and outlined strategies to ensure that every child is in school within a generation. At the 2019 CogX festival, Karboul contributed to a panel discussion about the future of work and education, where she highlighted the ways that AI could help provide solutions to the learning crisis in the Middle East and Africa.

== See also ==
- Mehdi Jomaa
- Elyes Fakhfakh
