= Sharmadean Reid =

British Jamaican entrepreneur (born 1984)

Sharmadean Reid MBE
- Born: Wolverhampton, England
- Education: Central Saint Martins
- Employer: WAH Nails
- Honours: MBE
- Website: wah-london.com

Sharmadean Reid MBE (born 28 May 1984) is a British Jamaican entrepreneur. She is the founder of WAH Nails and Beautystack. She is an advocate for women's empowerment.

== Early life and education ==
Reid was born to a Jamaican family with a father of Indian heritage in Wolverhampton in 1984. She completed a BTEC in Art and Design. She moved to London the month before she started a degree at Central Saint Martins, graduating with a degree in Fashion Communication and Promotion. During her degree she worked with Nicola Formichetti, Arena Homme + editor Jo-Ann Furniss and Alasdair McLellan. Reid started WAH (We Ain't Hoes) in 2005 while at university as a hip hop zine focusing on the new wave of street smart feminism. She used a Mac Mini and interviewed women in hip hop, building a community for women in the industry. She describes her skills in Adobe Photoshop and Adobe InDesign as the most important part of her feminist activism. The zine developed into the WAHappenings blog and WAH Power Lunches - opportunities for women to get together and discuss careers and ideas.

== Career ==
After graduating in 2007, Reid worked at the men's magazine Arena Homme Plus as a Sportswear Editor, before moving to Nike as a stylist. In June 2009, The Independent recognised Reid as one of the "15 people who will define the future of arts in Britain". Throughout 2018, Reid wrote a business advice column Bossing It for The Guardian. She delivered a TED talk about empowering women with technology at University College London in December 2018. Reid is an advisor for the charity Art Against Knives. She is a founding member of the British Beauty Council.

=== Wah Nails ===
Driven by the idea of a place for women to "hang out, form friendships and build communities" while being able to have "whatever you wanted on your nails", the first WAH Nails salon was opened in August 2009. In February 2010, WAH Nails opened concessions in Topshop Oxford Circus and Harvey Nichols Dublin. WAH Nails London was launched in September 2014. It used social media (including tumblr and Instagram) to grow a community by sharing viral images. WAH Nails has several high-profile patrons, including Serena Williams, Katarina Johnson-Thompson and Margot Robbie. They launched a product line at Boots UK, as well as a book. In November 2016, Reid launched her first clothing line inspired by Princess Diana and in collaboration with ASOS. In the same month WAH Nails launched in its London store a virtual reality nail experience, designed together with Kim Boutin, former digital art director at Kenzo. WAH have been featured in broadly.

=== Future Girl Corp ===
In 2016 Reid partnered with Tabitha Goldstaub to launch Future Girl Corp, a business boot camp for women entrepreneurs. The bootcamp launched with a twelve-month business workshop for future women CEOs in Shoreditch in 2016. She coordinated monthly training events for women entrepreneurs throughout 2017.

=== Beautystack ===
Reid became frustrated by the lack of technological solutions in beauty booking software. Reid founded BeautyStack alongside Daniel Woodbury and Ken Lalobo, an image-based booking system for beauty professionals, in May 2017. Beautystack closed a seed-funding round in 2018, raising over £1 million. This made Reid one of few black women worldwide to raise over £1 million. The platform allows influential beauty professionals to form networks. It was described as an Instagram-LinkedIn hybrid, combining social discovery with in-app booking. The app launched with a pop-up shop in Kings Cross, as well as a magazine and video. In 2021, BeautyStack evolved into The Stack to become a members club that involved other topics apart from beauty.

=== Awards and honours ===
Her awards and honours include; an MBE (Member of the Order of the British Empire) in the 2015 Queen's Birthday Honours for her services to the nail and beauty industry, a Marie Claire Future Shaper Award. In 2018 she received a CEW Achiever Award. In 2021 she won The Bold Future Award at the 2021 Bold Woman Awards.

=== New Methods for Women ===
In June 2024, Reid released her book New Methods for Women published by Penguin. The hardback featured 49 essays offering perspectives on life, career, friendship, parenting, and selfhood. The paperback was released in June 2025 featuring two new essays and a new cover.

=== 39BC ===
In August 2025, Reid launched her fragrance and bathing brand 39BC, inspired by Cleopatra, the brand launched with a collection of four scented body oil cleansers. In December 2025, Reid announced on LinkedIn that the brand was now stocked in Selfridges.

== Personal life ==
Reid has a son.
