= René Trabelsi =

Tunisian businessman and politician

René Trabelsi روني الطرابلسي
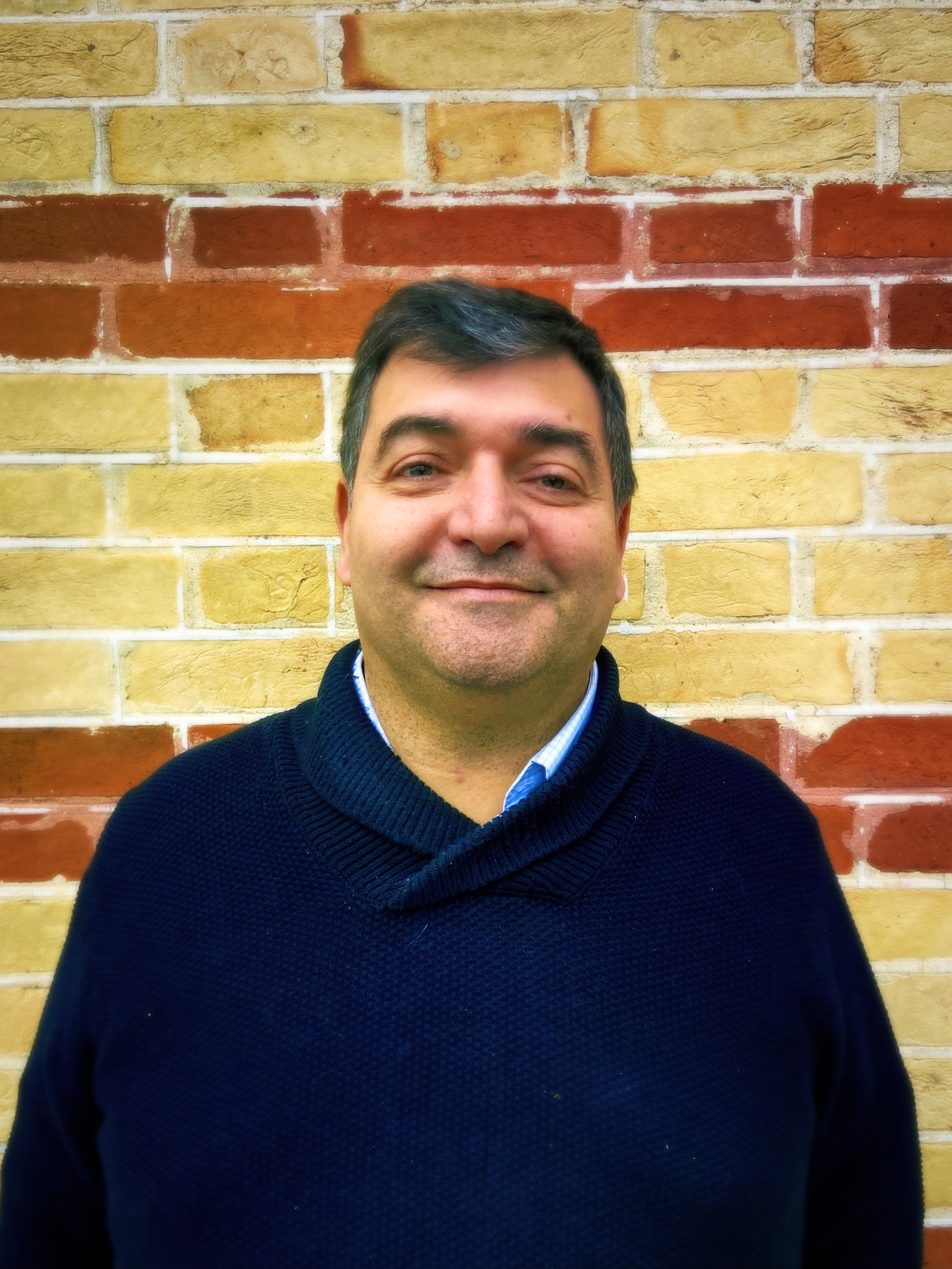
- Portrait of René Trabelsi

Minister of Tourism and Handicrafts
- In office 14 November 2018 – 27 February 2020
- Prime Minister: Youssef Chahed
- Preceded by: Selma Elloumi Rekik
- Succeeded by: Mohamed Ali Toumi

Personal details
- Born: 14 December 1962 (age 63) Djerba, Tunisia
- Party: Independent
- Profession: Businessman

René Trabelsi (Arabic: روني الطرابلسي; born 14 December 1962) is a Tunisian businessman and politician.

== Early career ==
Trabelsi completed his secondary studies in Djerba, Tunisia. In 1985, he left for France to continue his studies in management at a time when Tunisian Jews were particularly threatened: his 5-year-old nephew was killed in an antisemitic shooting in Djerba. Having dual French and Tunisian nationality, he initially managed franchise Franprix supermarkets in Ile-de-France before launching himself in the tourism industry. In the 1990s, he founded the tour operator Royal First Travel which specializes in visits to Tunisia. He managed a four-star hotel in Djerba for ten years.

Trabelsi is also a member of the Ghriba Pilgrimage Commission and is involved in the Tunisian Hotel Federation.

== Political career ==
In 2011, he joined a liberal political party by the name of the Party of the Future.

On 5 November 2018, during a cabinet reshuffle, the head of the Tunisian government, Youssef Chahed, appointed him to head the Ministry of Tourism to replace Selma Elloumi. The appointment of a Jewish minister is a first since 1957 and the nominations of Albert Bessis and André Barouch. As of the end of 2018 he was the only Arab country to count a Jewish minister.

His appointment created a controversy and protests occurred in the days following it. Hundreds of demonstrators denounce the supposed "pro-Zionist positions" of René Trablesi. The Tunisian Minority Support Association denounces a campaign of defamation against the new minister.

His appointment was, however, welcomed by Tunisian actors and specialists in tourism, who appreciate the arrival of a professional in the sector. On 12 November, MPs put their trust in all the proposed ministers, including Trabelsi, who won 127 votes to 25 and one abstention.

In January 2019, Trabelsi faced another controversy when rumors accused him of giving a television interview to I24news, an Israeli channel, during which he allegedly discussed the Palestinian situation and the possibility of normalization with Israel. He denied this information that the interview, conducted at the request of the Palestinian ambassador in Tunis, was conducted by a Tunisian team for SCOPAL, a British information platform.

Since September 2019, Trabelsi represented Tunisia on the Executive Board of the World Tourism Organization.

On 8 November 2019 Trabelsi was named interim Minister of Transport.

On 2 January 2020, incoming head of government Habib Jemli intended to keep Trabelsi in his position as Minister of Tourism. However, the Jemli government was unable to gain the confidence of the Assembly of People's Representatives and Trabelsi was replaced by Mohamed Ali Toumi.

== Private life ==
René Trabelsi is the son of Perez Trabelsi, chairman of the Jewish Ghriba Committee and leader of the Jewish community in Djerba.

A father of three children, he divides his time between Paris, Djerba and Tunis.

During the COVID-19 pandemic, Trabelsi tested positive for the virus and was admitted to hospital, in intensive care, in Paris. Trabelsi was released from the hospital on 27 May 2020.
