= Incheon declaration =

The Incheon declaration is a declaration on education adopted at the World Education Forum in Incheon, South Korea on 15 May 2015. It is the logical continuation of the Education For All (EFA) movement and the Millennium Development Goals on Education, and many of its goals were based on a review of progress made since the 2000 World Education Forum in Dakar.

== Declaration Content ==
=== Equality and Access ===
In keeping with its overall goal of ensuring education for all, the Incheon Declaration emphasizes several different types of equality. It focused on equal opportunity as well as the position that students' views must also be taken into consideration. In addition, emphasis is placed on ensuring that cost and discrimination do not prevent people from pursuing and receiving quality education. Gender equality is specifically mentioned as an important aspect of an educational system while diversity is not considered a problem but a resource.

=== Improvement of Outcomes ===
The signatories of the Incheon Declaration also agreed to make improvements in educational outcomes. For instance, it established its commitment "to ensuring that all youth and adults, especially girls and women, achieve relevant and recognized functional literacy and numeracy proficiency levels." Outcome goals also include having developed countries reaching 0.7% of gross national product (GNP) for official development assistance (ODA) to developing countries.

=== Funding ===
Another key recommendation contained in the Incheon Declaration regards funding for education. The signatories are urged to commit 4-6% of their Gross domestic product or 15-20% of their public expenditures to improving the status of education.

== Education 2030: A new vision for education ==
The Education 2030 Framework for Action, adopted at Incheon in May 2015, recognises lifelong learning for all as one of the underpinning principles of this new vision, stating that "all age groups, including adults, should have opportunities to learn and continue learning." The framework, which reaffirmed the commitments outlined in the Education for All initiative, became part of the Sustainable Development Goals as SDG4 and was adopted by the United Nations in September of the same year. Those who signed onto the declaration committed to provide twelve years of primary and secondary education paid for by the public. Further, nine of those years will be compulsory. It also calls on countries to "develop policies and programmes for the provision of quality distance learning in tertiary education, with appropriate financing and use of technology, including the Internet, massive open online courses (MOOCs) and other modalities that meet accepted quality standards to improve access."

== Progress ==
Between 2012 and 2019, expenditure per student in OECD countries increased by an average rate of 1.6% per year. Nonetheless, it was estimated that in 2018, on average, member countries of the Organisation for Economic Co-operation and Development (OECD) were spending 11% of their public budgets on education, compared to the 15-20% recommended by the Incheon declaration. About one third of the countries missed both of the benchmarks set out in the declaration.

During the COVID-19 pandemic, education budgets and official aid program budgets for education decreased. UNESCO estimates that educational shutdowns during the pandemic affected nearly 1.6 billion students: 94% of the student population and one-fifth of the global population. Closures are estimated to have lasted for an average of 41 weeks (10.3 months). They have had significant negative effects on student learning, which are predicted to have substantial long-term effects on both education and earnings. The pandemic has disproportionately affected already disadvantaged students. Countries and governments must prioritize education to mitigate the effects of such disruptions.

== See also ==
- Qingdao Declaration

== Sources ==
This article incorporates text from a free content work. Licensed under CC-BY-SA IGO 3.0 (license statement/permission). Text taken from Making Sense of MOOCs: A Guide for Policy-Makers in Developing Countries, 13, Patru, Mariana; Balaji, Venkataraman, UNESCO. UNESCO.
