= Selma Elloumi Rekik =

Tunisian minister and presidential candidate

Selma Elloumi Rekik سلمى اللومي الرقيق
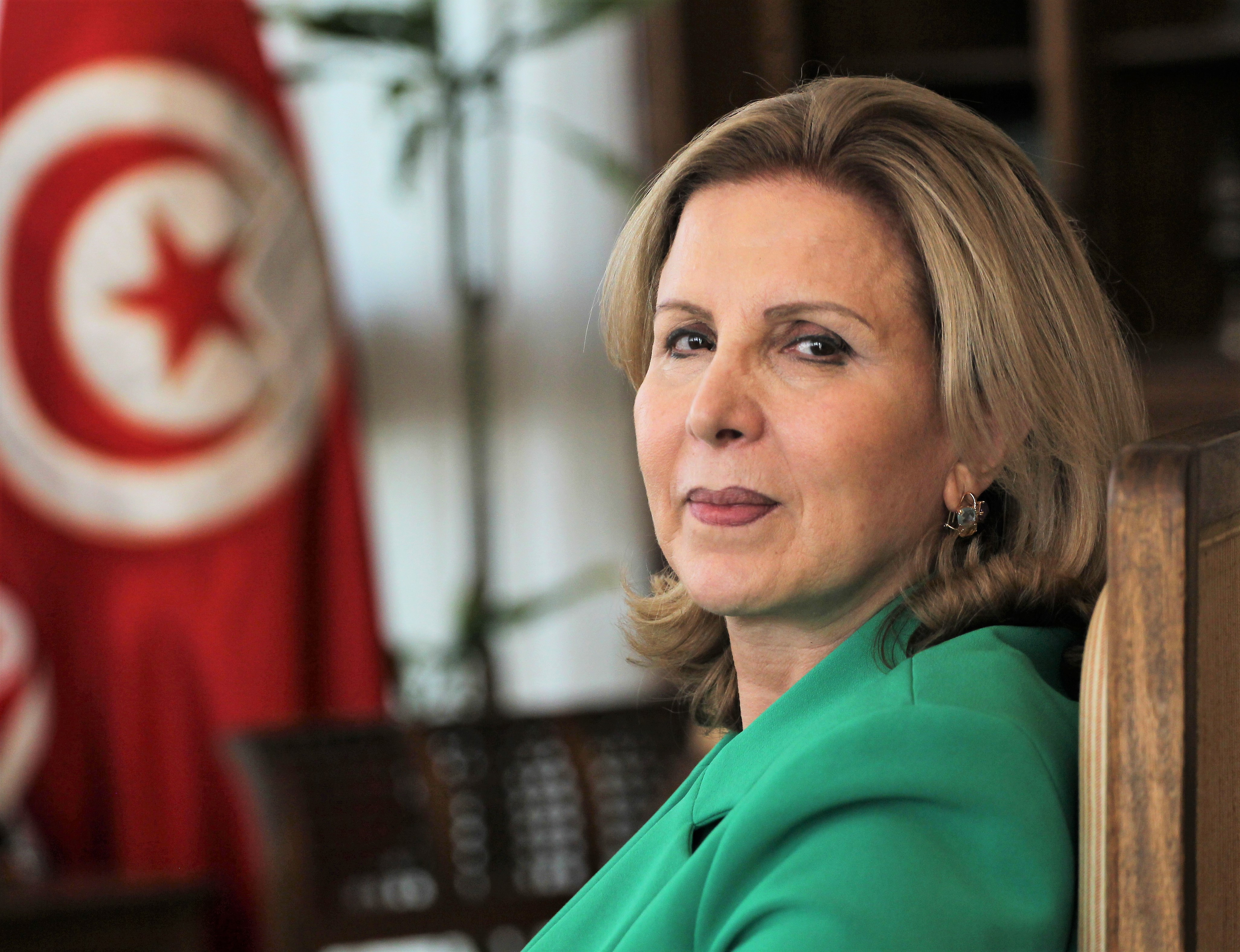
- Elloumi in 2017

Minister of Tourism and Handicrafts
- In office 2 February 2015 – 14 November 2018
- Prime Minister: Habib Essid; Youssef Chahed
- Preceded by: Amel Karboul
- Succeeded by: René Trabelsi

Personal details
- Born: 5 June 1956 (age 70) Tunis, Tunisia
- Party: Nidaa Tounes (2012–2019); Al Amal (from 2019)
- Spouse: Raouf Rekik
- Children: 3
- Education: University of Tunis
- Profession: Businesswoman, Politician

Selma Elloumi Rekik (Arabic: سلمى اللومي الرقيق; born 5 June 1956) is originally from Tunis. She is a businesswoman, Tunisian politician and was a member of Nidaa Tounes, though she currently is part of Al Amal.

== Biography ==
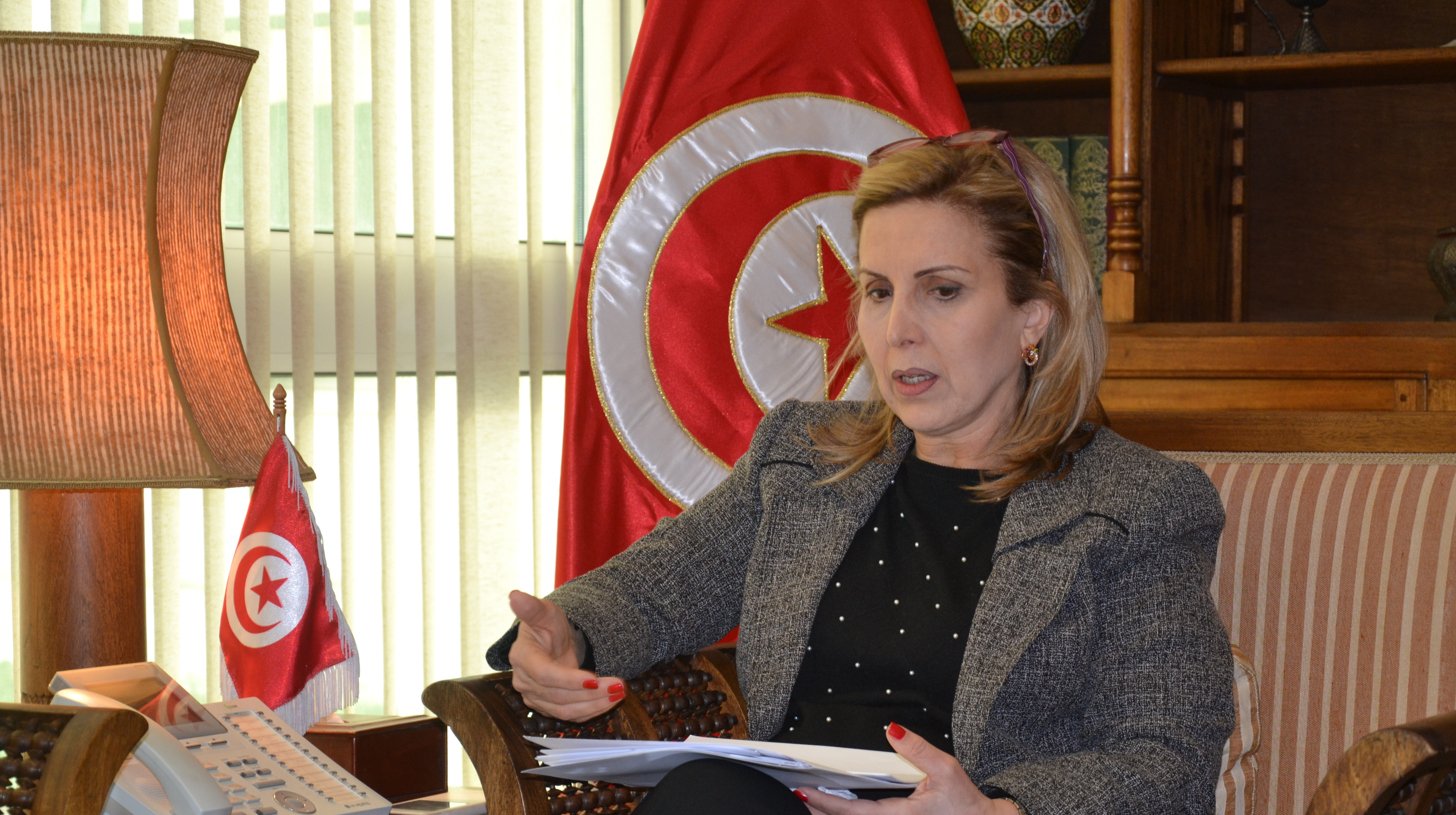
Elloumi at her office at the Ministry of Tourism

Elloumi was a member of the executive committee of Nidaa Tounes.

She was also a candidate for the legislative elections in 2014 representing her party and elected a deputy in the Assembly of the representatives of the people in the first district of Nabeul.

On 2 February 2015, she was nominated for the position of Minister of Vocational Training and Employment, then she was hired for the position of Minister of Tourism and Handicrafts, in succession to Amel Karboul, in Habib Essid government.

On August 13, 2017, on the occasion of the Women's Day, she was decorated with the insignia of the Commander of the Order of the Tunisian Republic.

On November 1, 2018, she was appointed director of the presidential cabinet to replace Selim Azzabi. She resigned on May 14, 2019, in the context of the internal tensions in Nidaa Tounes, of which she assumed the presidency on May 28. However, she resigned from office on June 23, and left the party.

In late June, after the justice system recognized Hafedh Caid Essebsi as the party's legal representative, Elloumi took over the chairmanship of Amal Tounes, the new name of the Democratic Reform movement founded in 2011, a decision however canceled on July 20. Elloumi then took the head of another party, Al Amal, formerly known as the Tunisian National Party. She was a candidate in the 2019 Tunisian presidential elections of September 15, but she is finally eliminated in the first round. On September 24, 2019, she called for the release of Nabil Karoui.
