= Madras School =

System of education in Chennai, India

Madras School is a system of education prevailing in the city of Chennai, India (formerly known as Madras) discovered in the early part of the 19th century, though believed to be much older, wherein education was imparted by senior pupils who educated juniors. This mode of education was recommended for implementation in the United Kingdom by the educationist Andrew Bell.
