= Brave Bison =

UK-based media, marketing and technology company

- Type: Public
- Traded as: AIM: BBSN
- Industry: Digital marketing, social media, media technology, market research & consultancy, professional education
- Founded: 2011 (as Rightster)
- Headquarters: London, United Kingdom
- Key people: Oliver Green (Executive Chair), Theo Green (Chief Growth Officer)
- Revenue: 2024: £21.3 million (net revenue); 2023: £20.9 million (net revenue); 2022: £16.9 million; 2021: £7.8 million; 2020: £4.0 million
- Website: Official website

Brave Bison Group plc is a media, marketing and technology company listed on London's AIM market. The company provides services across digital marketing, social media, fan engagement, marketing training and technology consultancy through a portfolio of specialist divisions including SocialChain, Engage Digital Partners, Brave Bison Performance, Brave Bison Commerce, MiniMBA and MTM. It also operates its own digital media network of over 650 channels and 158 million followers. The business is headquartered in London with hubs in Manchester, New York, India, Australia and Egypt.

== History ==
The company was founded in 2011 as Rightster, a YouTube multichannel network and rights-management platform, and rebranded as Brave Bison in 2016.

In January 2020, Oli Green joined the board following an investment by Tangent, a technology business, with his brother Theo Green later taking an executive role in the company’s expansion programme.

Brave Bison has expanded through acquisitions since 2021. It bought digital media agency Greenlight Digital and Greenlight Commerce in 2021, acquiring clients including New Balance, Currys, Gap and Furniture Village.

In 2023, Brave Bison acquired social-media agency SocialChain, which was originally founded by entrepreneur Steven Bartlett. SocialChain worked with clients including KFC, Arla Foods and Pernod Ricard.

In December 2024, Brave Bison acquired Engage Digital Partners for about £11 million, expanding into sports rights and fan-engagement media for clients including Real Madrid, the All Blacks and Formula 1.

In March 2025, Brave Bison acquired independent SEO, content and digital PR agency Builtvisible, integrating it into its performance practice. Clients include The Very Group, Icelandair and Specsavers.

In April 2025, Brave Bison acquired The Fifth, an influencer-marketing agency founded by News UK in 2019. News UK is part of News Corp, the global media conglomerate controlled by Rupert Murdoch. As part of the transaction, News Corp became a top-ten shareholder in Brave Bison.

In June 2025, Brave Bison bought MiniMBA, the online marketing-training business founded by Professor Mark Ritson, for £19 million. The platform provides training across marketing, brand management and general management, educating more than 6,000 marketers each year and maintaining an alumni base of more than 50,000 people from brands such as Red Bull, Salesforce, Google, American Express, Unilever and Nike.

In September 2025, Brave Bison acquired MTM, an insights and consultancy firm, for up to £12 million, creating a new consultancy division focused on media, technology and audience strategy, with clients including Google, Samsung, Figma, Spotify and the BBC.

Earlier, in April 2020, Brave Bison acquired the intellectual property and social-media channels of The Hook following its administration, integrating them into the Brave Bison Media Network.

== Operations ==
Brave Bison operates through specialist divisions covering social and influencer marketing, performance marketing, commerce technology, fan engagement, training, consultancy and owned media.

- SocialChain — social-first creative and influencer marketing, producing campaigns for brands including Primark, TikTok and LinkedIn. SocialChain was originally founded by entrepreneur Steven Bartlett.
- Brave Bison Performance — provides paid-media, performance-marketing and SEO services across search, social and programmatic platforms for clients such as New Balance, The Very Group, Icelandair and Specsavers.
- Brave Bison Commerce — delivers digital-commerce and web-experience solutions, helping global retail clients including Caffè Nero and Worldline optimise their online operations.
- Engage Digital Partners — sports media, rights management and fan-engagement services for organisations such as Real Madrid, the ICC, Formula 1 and New Zealand Rugby.
- MiniMBA — an online marketing-education platform offering training programmes for professionals worldwide.
- MTM — insight and strategy consultancy delivering media and technology research for clients including Google and Spotify.
- Brave Bison Media Network — a portfolio of owned and operated YouTube channels across entertainment, sport and lifestyle, reaching more than 150 million monthly views.

== Clients and work ==
Brave Bison has published case studies or regulatory announcements referencing work with New Balance, PGA Tour, Australian Open, US Open, SharkNinja, Primark, YouTube, Disney+, Amazon Prime Video, TikTok, LinkedIn, Pfizer and Google.

== Ownership and investment ==
In January 2020, investors including Oli and Theo Green increased their holdings in Brave Bison, with Oli Green joining the board. In 2025, News UK (a subsidiary of News Corp, the media group controlled by Rupert Murdoch) became a minority shareholder following the acquisition of The Fifth.

== Strategic developments ==
In October 2025, The Times reported that Brave Bison was considering a possible £22 million offer for The Mission Group plc, an AIM-listed marketing-communications network.

== See also ==
- SocialChain
- MiniMBA
- Digital marketing
- Fan engagement
- E-commerce
- YouTube
