= Learning crisis =

Education issue

The learning crisis or global learning crisis is the education issue concerning poor learning despite access to schooling, especially in developing countries. Worldwide, millions of children who attend school do not acquire basic skills such as literacy and numeracy, and many more are far behind age-appropriate expectations in their national curricula. Proponents argue that this crisis needs to be addressed due to the importance of education in fostering children's development, social mobility, and subsequent opportunities.

Many factors have been identified as causes of the global learning crisis. These include inadequate funding, socioeconomic factors, and quality of teachers. Another contributing factor is that many education systems monitor educational quality using inadequate indicators. In many countries, governments rely on input-based proxies for quality such as budget spent on education and student enrolment numbers, rather than outcome-based measures of student learning.

Experts have argued that overcoming the global learning crisis will require systemic, well-aligned reform of national education systems that goes beyond addressing individual policy areas such as schooling access, student assessment, and teacher quality.

== Background ==
Schooling access has expanded massively in recent decades, almost reaching the target of universal primary-school enrollment by 2030. Making education accessible to everyone has been a priority of the international community since it was articulated in Article 26 of the Universal Declaration of Human Rights (UDHR) in 1948. The goal of expanding basic education was also articulated in the World Declaration on Education for All, which resulted from an assembly in Jomtien, Thailand, in 1990. The World Declaration on Education for All focuses on aspects such as the provision of basic education for everyone, the importance of education in improving world's prosperity, as well as incorporating local culture to promote education development.

However, in many education systems, children may progress in years of schooling without corresponding progress in learning levels. Researchers in economics and education have long argued that school enrollment expansion has a positive effect on economic growth. But recent statistical analyses and results from international student assessments have indicated that a greater school enrolment has not yet been followed by quality learning in many parts of the world.

A team of researchers from the World Bank have developed a database of internationally harmonized learning outcomes by linking regional assessments of core academic subjects in less developed countries to international achievement for developed countries. Based on their database, the rate of school enrolment reached more than 90 percent in 2010, but learning outcomes in developing countries are very low and stagnant. For example, the enrolment rate in the Middle East and North Africa region increased to 99 percent in 2010; however, the learning level from 2000 to 2015 remained nearly unchanged from the low-performance benchmark. For example, in Kenya, Tanzania, and Uganda, 75 percent of the students in grade 3 cannot read a basic sentence such as "the name of the dog is Puppy". Furthermore, 90 percent of 10-year-olds in low-income countries are unable to read and understand simple text. Across the 95 non-OECD countries with multiple years of observation, the average score is 405, compared to the OECD average of 500. At the current pace of progress, it will take 102 years for these countries to reach the OECD average.

In the case of middle-income countries, many education systems are also failing to facilitate the learning of children who are attending school.

- In South Africa, 78 percent of children do not learn to read for meaning in the first three years of school.
- In India, more than half of the Grade 5 students have not mastered Grade 2 literacy. A study conducted by Das and Zajonc (2008) finds that even after nine years of education, around 30 to 40 percent of children in Rajasthan and Orissa, India fail to pass the lowest international benchmark of basic mathematical knowledge.
- In Nigeria, 53 percent of 10-year-olds are unable to write nor read. According to a report by the World Bank (2017), only 66 percent of grade 4 students in Nigerian public schools can read one out of three words and 78 percent are able to do single digit addition. The number by gender is more concerning where only 1 percent of women who completed Grade 6 can read a single sentence in their native language.
- In Indonesia, despite achieving universal primary enrollment in 1988, the result of the Program for International Student Assessment (PISA) results of Indonesian students remained low in 2018. A 2021 paper confirms that less than 1 in 3 students in Indonesia had the ability to answer level 2 or above questions in mathematics. Similarly, the result from the Trends in International Mathematics and Science Study (TIMSS) in 2015 also finds that 27 percent of 4th graders in Indonesia failed to meet the most basic mathematical knowledge.

The learning crisis has worsened due to the COVID-19 pandemic that began in 2020. These learning losses have been attributed to temporary school closures and the shift to remote learning.

== Usage ==
Foundational thinking about the learning crisis was laid out in Lant Pritchett's 2013 book

The Rebirth of Education: Schooling Ain't Learning. The term "learning crisis" has since been used widely in the international education discourse, both by international organisations such as the World Bank and in academic research. According to the Google Books Ngram Viewer, usage of the terms "global learning crisis" and "learning crisis" has rapidly increased beginning in the 2010s

=== Usage of the term "learning crisis" by prominent global organizations ===
UNESCO used the term "learning crisis" in their 2014 report, Teaching and Learning: Achieving Quality for All. The report described the urgency for policymakers worldwide to prioritize tackling the global learning crisis as more than 250 out of 650 million children were not learning basic skills in math and reading.

In 2018, the term of "learning crisis" was again used in the World Development Report. The 2018 WDR explores several main themes: 1) education's promise; 2) the need to shine a light on learning; 3) how to make schools work for learners; and 4) how to make systems work for learning.

Although they do not explicitly use the term "learning crisis", the United Nations' Sustainable Development Goals create targets for student learning in addition completion of schooling. This emphasis on learning aligns with the concept of the learning crisis, and it contrasts with the previous educational target of the Millennium Development Goals, which focused on universal primary schooling without mentioning learning outcomes. Based on the United Nations' goal of ensuring quality education, the following Sustainable Development Goal targets have been defined:

- Target 4.1: By 2030, ensure that all girls and boys complete free, equitable, and quality primary and secondary education leading to relevant and effective learning outcomes.
- Target 4.2: By 2030, ensure that all girls and boys have access to quality early childhood development, care, and pre-primary education so that they are ready for primary education.
- Target 4.3: By 2030, ensure equal access for all women and men to affordable and quality technical, vocational, and tertiary education, including university.
- Target 4.4: By 2030, substantially increase the number of youth and adults who have relevant skills, including technical and vocational skills, for employment, decent jobs and entrepreneurship.
- Target 4.5: By 2030, eliminate gender disparities in education and ensure equal access to all levels of education and vocational training for the vulnerable, including persons with disabilities, indigenous peoples and children in vulnerable situations.
- Target 4.6: By 2030, ensure that all youth and a substantial proportion of adults both men and women achieve literacy and numeracy.
- Target 4.7: By 2030, ensure that all learners acquire the knowledge and skills needed to promote sustainable development, including, among others, through education for sustainable development and sustainable lifestyles, human rights, gender equality, promotion of a culture of peace and non-violence, global citizenship and appreciation of cultural diversity and of culture's contribution to sustainable development.

The term of "learning crisis" has also been used by private corporations. McKinsey & Company, for instance, have utilized this term in their 2022 report regarding the impact of COVID-19 in worsening the existing global learning crisis.

=== Usage of the term "learning crisis" in academic research ===
Apart from its use in international education and international development, the term "learning crisis" is increasingly used in academic research. For example, Sam Hickey and Naomi Hossain's 2019 edited volume, The Politics of Education in Developing Countries: From Schooling to Learning, uses the learning crisis as one of its organizing concepts.

Additionally, the International Journal of Educational Development (IJED) published a special issue assessing how learning profiles—an approach for analysing the progression of children's learning over time—can be used to inform key actors in education systems on the state of the learning crisis and how to address it.

A multi-country research programme called Research on Improving Systems of Education (RISE) aims to understand how education systems in developing countries can overcome the global learning crisis. This mission of eradicating the global learning crisis is pursued through generating rigorous research and working closely with governments, NGOs, and donors to connect research and policy and improve learning for all.

=== Usage in national policy documents ===
In terms of national policy documents, the term "learning crisis" was also included in India's National Education Policy 2020. It is mentioned that the Government of India is prioritizing policies to support students' ability to read, write, carry out basic numerical operations due to the ongoing learning crisis. This policy also acknowledges the need to support all methods in supporting teachers to attain universal foundational literacy and numeracy through one-on-one, peer tutoring, or volunteer activities.

== Learning poverty ==
The learning poverty indicator was first launched by the World Bank and the UNESCO Institute for Statistics in 2019 to highlight the global learning crisis.

Learning poverty is a standardized measure of literacy. Specifically, it measures the proportion of children who cannot read a simple story by the age of 10. One important objective of learning poverty is to compare learning levels across countries.

According to the World Bank (2021), the learning poverty indicator is calculated as follows:

LP = [LD x (1-SD)] + [1 X SD]

LP = Learning poverty

LD = Learning deprivation; this is defined as the share of children at the end of primary who read at below the minimum proficiency level.

SD = Schooling deprivation; this is defined as the share of primary aged children who are out-of-school. All out-of-school children are assumed to be below the minimum proficiency level in reading.

When we say that the learning poverty rate in Pakistan is 75 percent, this comprises children that are out of school and children who are in school but cannot read and comprehend a simple paragraph by the age of 10.

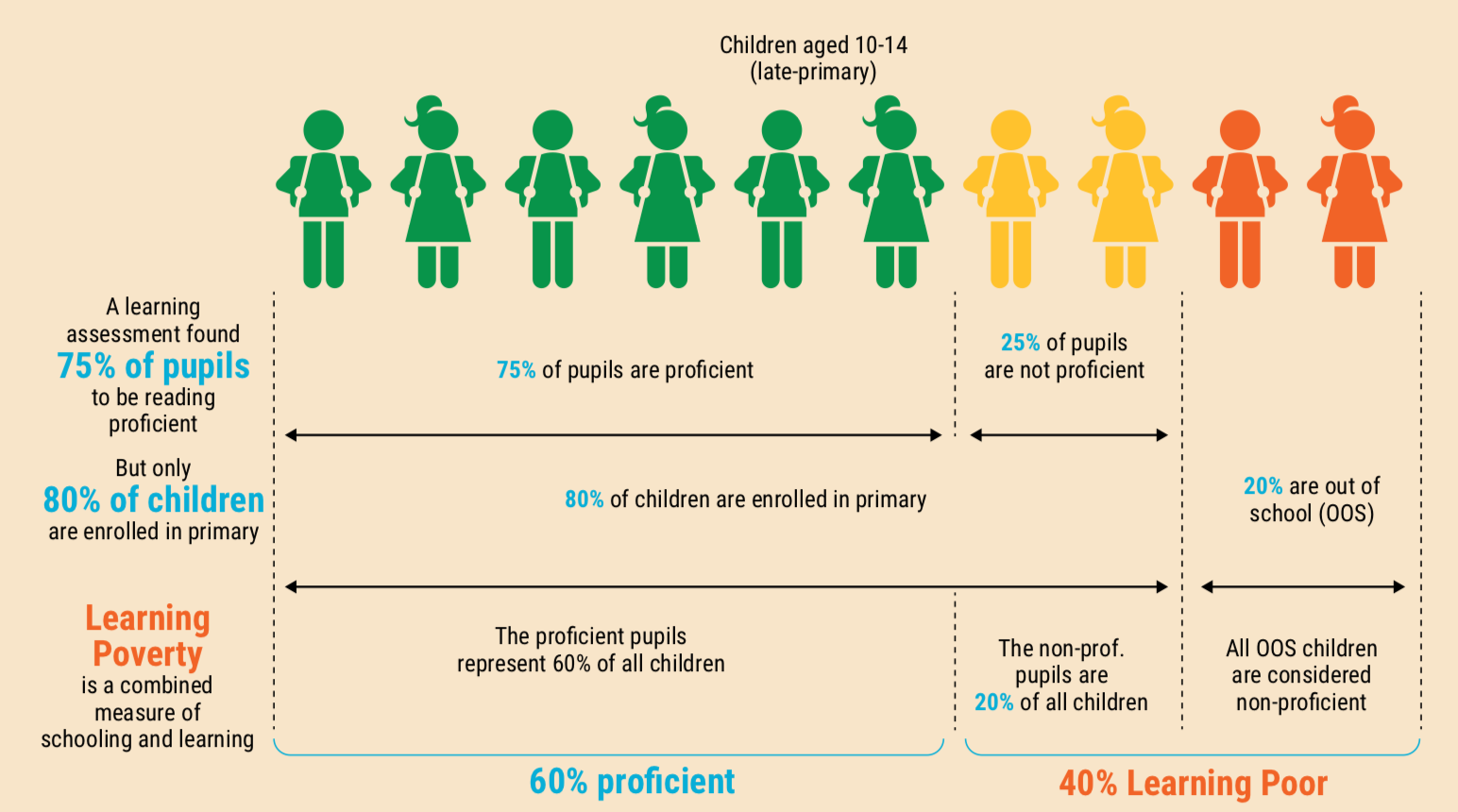
Learning Poverty is the weighted average of the share of the population below the minimum proficiency level, adjusted by the out-of-school population.

Thus, this indicator brings together schooling and learning indicators as it is measured by; i) the share of children who have not yet achieved minimum reading proficiency; ii) adjusted by the proportion of children who are out of school. Using this measure that was developed by the World Bank and UNESCO's Institute of Statistics, high rates of learning poverty are a signal that the current education system fails to ensure children's foundational skill development. Moreover, the learning poverty rate combines schooling and learning in a single yet easy to understand indicator.

Using the learning poverty indicator, the World Bank finds that on average, 53 percent of children in low and middle income countries suffer from learning poverty. To be more specific, 55 percent of children in lower-middle-income countries cannot read proficiently. The percentage is even higher in low-income countries where 90 percent of children cannot read proficiently.

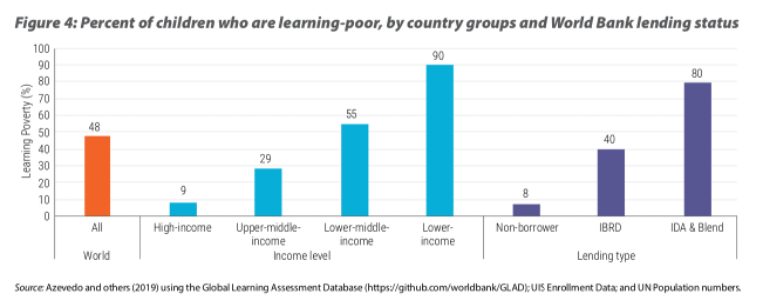
Percentage of children who are categorized as learning-poor, grouped by country groups.

If categorised by gender, it is observed that girls scored 6 percentage points less than boys on average. The difference between gender is most profound in the Middle East and North Africa and East Asia.

Under business-as-usual scenarios worldwide, learning poverty is projected to decrease by less than 1 percentage point per year. Under this current rate of progress, the goal of eliminating learning poverty by 2030 will not be possible. Thus, a set of strategies for helping children to read and a system-wide commitment to focus on education quality is needed.

Since the launch of the learning poverty indicator, other researchers have developed indicators and conducted analyses elaborating the concept of learning poverty or educational poverty.

== Proposals for addressing the learning crisis ==
In the 2014 UNESCO EFA Global Monitoring Report discussing the learning crisis, Teaching and Learning: Achieving Quality for All, one of the biggest focuses is to increase access to quality teaching, especially for disadvantaged children around the world. Some of the recommendations given were:

- Fill teacher gaps.
- Attract best candidates to teaching.
- Train teachers to meet the needs of all children.
- Prepare teacher educators and mentors to support teachers.
- Get teachers to where they are needed most.
- Use competitive career and pay structures to retain the best teachers.
- Improve teacher governance to maximize impact.
- Equip teachers with innovative curricula to improve learning.
- Develop classroom assessment to help teachers identify and support students at risk of not learning.
- Provide better data on trained teachers

Researchers from the RISE Programme have proposed four principles for addressing the learning crisis by aligning levels of instruction with goals and the needs of students (ALIGNS). The four principles are:

- Set clear learning goals that are coherent with children's current learning levels.
- Make instruction coherent with both children's current learning levels and targeted learning progress.
- Provide effective and coherent support to teachers.
- Find contextually appropriate ways to implement the preceding principles

In October 2020, in response to widespread school closures during the COVID-19 pandemic, a coalition of over 600 organisations from different fields multilaterals, civil society, research, philanthropy, youth, and media published a white paper titled Save Our Future: Aveting an Education Catastrophe for the World's Children. The seven action areas proposed in this white paper are:

- Prioritize reopening schools, deliver vital services to children, and treat the workforce as frontline workers.
- Make education inclusive, engaging, and adaptive.
- Strengthen the education workforce.
- Focus education technology (EdTech) where it is proven to be effective and most equitable.
- Protect education budgets and target public spending at those left.
- Mobilize international resources to fully finance education.
- Use resources better by improving evidence generation, coordination, alignment, and effectiveness.

== Criticisms of the "learning crisis" and related terminology ==
=== Criticisms of the "learning crisis" ===
Some criticisms have emerged of the term "learning crisis", especially after it was used in the 2018 World Development Report. For example, comparative education scholar Iveta Silova argues that the crisis in education quality stems from bigger structural and systemic issues, such as global poverty, inequality, and other international development challenges. Despite ever-increasing investment by national governments and even international organizations, learning disparities between countries persist and one of the reasons underlying the stagnancy of growth is the logic of colonialism. The colonial logic forces developing countries and put the golden standard on measures or practices of developed countries, which are not necessarily implementable within the context of other countries. Thus, reframing the issue of global "learning crisis" to issues underlying the phenomenon, such as the "international development" crisis is more appropriate.

Others have advanced similar critiques.

=== Criticisms of "learning poverty" ===
Nadia Naviwala, a Wilson Center Global Fellow based in Pakistan, has criticised the learning poverty indicator on the basis that its internationally comparable data can sometimes contradict the results from national level data. For example, Pakistan has an annual student assessment database called ASER. ASER has measured the ability of fifth graders to read a story since 2008. In 2018, ASER concluded that 56 percent of fifth graders could read a story in Urdu, Sindhi, or Pashto. In contrast, the Learning Poverty indicator suggests that only 25 percent of 10-year-olds in Pakistan can read and understand a simple paragraph.

Naviwala further argues that many international tests/indicators such as the learning poverty indicator do not measure the correct problem due to lack of context. Even though the "learning poverty" index creates a comparable indicator between countries, it lacks the purpose of relevancy to local educational concerns and policy options. Thus, it can be difficult to infer meaningful conclusions from the index itself.

David Archer, head of participation and public services at ActionAid, has further criticized the learning poverty indicator on the basis that, among other things, the World Bank should not be setting global goals for education because it is a financial institution led by economists rather than an organisation mandated to focus on education

== The learning crisis and COVID-19 ==
Main article: Impact of the COVID-19 pandemic on education, Impact of the COVID-19 pandemic on children

During the COVID-19 pandemic, approximately 1.6 billion school and college students had their studies interrupted. Additionally, more than 214 million children worldwide lost more than 75 percent of in-class teaching due to the pandemic. An analysis done by UNICEF (2021) shows that more than 60 percent of school closures happened in Latin America and the Caribbean, affecting more than 97 million children at school.[63] In terms of the length of school closures, Uganda had one of the longest school closure during the pandemic where schools were closed for approximately 83 weeks between February 16, 2020, to October 31, 2021

Using a simulated model, researchers from the World Bank (2022) found that after the pandemic, 70 percent of children in low and middle income countries may suffer from learning poverty. This is an additional 1 out of every 8 children to falling into learning poverty compared to prior to the pandemic. These estimates indicate that, in the absence of any intervention, the current generation of students have the potential to lose $21 trillion in lifetime earnings, and most of this cost will be endured by students from lower socioeconomic backgrounds. In order to prevent this from happening, a framework by the World Bank, UNICEF, UNESCO, USAID, FCDO, and the Bill & Melinda Gates Foundation (2022) suggested that national governments all over the world should work hand in hand in identifying and reaching the most learning-disadvantaged groups, provide comprehensive support for children in need, support teachers to address learning losses, and engage parents and communities to ensure a supportive learning environment.
