= Lewis family (Canada) =

Political family

Lewis
- Current region: Canada
- Earlier spellings: Łoś, Losz
- Origin: (Polish) Vistula Land, Russian Empire (now Belarus)

The Lewis family is a Canadian political family, who have Polish-Jewish heritage. It includes the labour activist Morris Lewis, former Leader of the New Democratic Party David Lewis, former Permanent Representative of Canada to the United Nations Stephen Lewis, and current federal NDP leader Avi Lewis.

== Notable members ==
- Morris Lewis (born Mojżesz Łoś, also known as Moishe Losz) (1888 – 1950) was a Jewish labour activist in Eastern Europe and Canada. Losz anglicized the family name to "Lewis", moving to Montreal in May 1921 following the Polish-Soviet War. He was a member of the socialist General Jewish Labour Bund, and was married to Rose Lazarovitch. He is the father of David Lewis.
  - David Lewis (1909 – 1981) was a Canadian lawyer and politician. He was a member of the Co-operative Commonwealth Federation, and helped create the Canadian Labour Congress in 1956 and the New Democratic Party (NDP) in 1961. He served as a Member of Parliament for York South and as the second Leader of the New Democratic Party from 1971 to 1975. When David was elected the NDP's leader in 1971, he and Stephen became one of the first father-and-son teams to head Canadian political parties simultaneously. He had 4 children and was married to Sophie Carson. His daughter, Nina Lewis, married Daniel Libeskind, a Polish–American architect, in 1969. The couple has 3 children.
    - Michael Lewis is the son of David Lewis and was provincial secretary of the Ontario NDP in the 1980s and 1990s. He was the longtime political director of the United Steel Workers union in Canada.
    - Janet Solberg is the daughter of David Lewis and was president of the Ontario NDP in the 1980s and 1990s. She has worked as a researcher for the CRTC, policy and communications advisor for the NDP federal caucus under Ed Broadbent, and as a labour nominee on boards of arbitration.
    - Stephen Lewis (1937 – 2026) was a Canadian politician and diplomat who served as the Canadian Ambassador to the United Nations under prime minister Brian Mulroney from 1984 to 1988 and as leader of the Ontario New Democratic Party from 1970 to 1978. He represented the riding of Scarborough West in the Legislative Assembly of Ontario. He married author Michele Landsberg in 1963 and had 3 children, including Avi Lewis.
      - Michele Landsberg (born 1939) is a Canadian journalist, activist, and author, who married Stephen Lewis in 1963. She has 3 children.
      - Avi Lewis (born 1967) is leader of the New Democratic Party of Canada since 2026 and previously a Canadian journalist, activist, and broadcaster. The son of Stephen Lewis and Michele Landsberg, he married author Naomi Klein and has 1 child.
        - Naomi Klein (born 1970) is a Canadian author, social activist, and filmmaker known for her political analyses; support of ecofeminism, organized labour, and criticism of corporate globalization, fascism and capitalism. She is married to Avi Lewis and has 1 child. Klein's mother, Bonnie Sherr Klein, is a Canadian filmmaker and activist and is married to Michael Klein. Klein's brother, Seth, is an author and was the director of the British Columbia office of the Canadian Centre for Policy Alternatives (CCPA) for 22 years. Seth is the domestic partner of politician Christine Boyle.
      - Ilana Landsberg-Lewis (born 1965) is a Canadian labour and human rights lawyer and activist who served as executive director of the Stephen Lewis Foundation. In 2026, she was appointed chief executive officer of Rainbow Railroad. She is the daughter of Stephen Lewis and Michele Landsberg. She was previously married to Lorraine Segato, a Canadian singer-songwriter.
      - Jenny Lewis (born 1970) is a Canadian casting director. She is the daughter of Stephen Lewis and Michele Landsberg.

== Ancestry ==
The family have Belarusian-Jewish and Ashkenazi Jewish heritage.

== Offices held ==
Leader of the Official Opposition of Ontario

- 1975 to 1977

Leader of the New Democratic Party

- 1971 to 1975 (David)
- 2026 to present (Avi)

Leader of the Ontario New Democratic Party

- 1970 to 1978

National President of the Co-operative Commonwealth Federation

- 1958 to 1961

National Chairman of the Co-operative Commonwealth Federation

- 1954 to 1958

National Secretary of the Co-operative Commonwealth Federation

- 1936 to 1950

Diplomatic
Canadian Ambassador to the United Nations

- 1984 to 1988

United Nations Special Envoy for HIV/AIDS in Africa

- 2001 to 2006

Parliamentarian
Member of the House of Commons

- York South
  - 1962 to 1963
  - 1965 to 1974

Member of Provincial Parliament

- Scarborough West
  - 1963 to 1978

== See also ==
- Trudeau family
- Mulroney family
- Hardisty family
- Ford family (Canada)
