= 1982 Ontario New Democratic Party leadership election =

- February 7, 1982
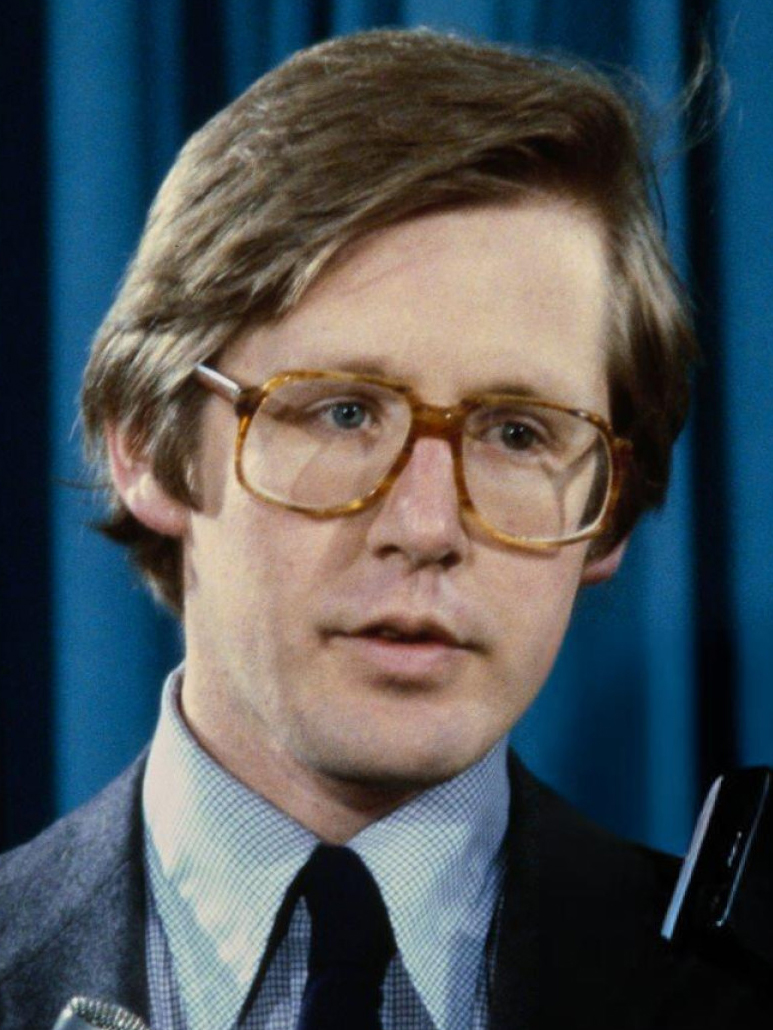

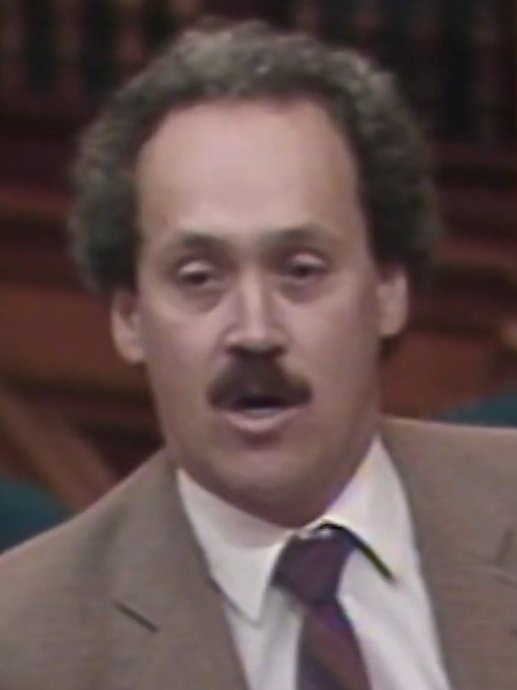

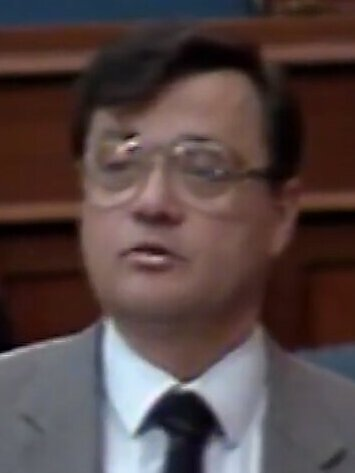
Candidate	Bob Rae	Richard Johnston	Jim Foulds
Riding	Broadview–Greenwood	Scarborough West	Port Arthur
Final ballot	1,356 (64.57%)	512 (24.38%)	232 (11.05%)
Leader before election
Michael Cassidy
Elected Leader
Bob Rae

1982 Ontario New Democratic Party leadership election
- Date: February 5–7, 1982
- Convention: Harbour Castle Convention Centre; Toronto, Ontario
- Resigning leader: Michael Cassidy
- Won by: Bob Rae
- Ballots: 1
- Candidates: 3

The 1982 Ontario New Democratic Party leadership election was held in Toronto, Ontario, on February 7, 1982, to elect a successor to Michael Cassidy as leader of the Ontario New Democratic Party (NDP). The convention was necessary because Cassidy resigned after the party's poor showing in the 1981 election. Bob Rae was an overwhelming favourite and this continued into the convention which Rae won on the first ballot. Rae went on to lead his party to their first election win in 1990.

== Background ==
In the 1981 election, the New Democrats lost 11 seats and the Progressive Conservatives under Premier Bill Davis regained majority status. Michael Cassidy resigned after only three years as leader. At the time of Cassidy's departure, Bob Rae was a federal MP from the Toronto riding of Broadview—Greenwood. The son of a diplomat and a Rhodes scholar, he was a popular member of the Federal NDP caucus. As finance critic, he had a high-profile role in Ottawa. He said the path he was on was a good one but a bigger challenge was in the Ontario provincial leadership. He said, "We have a chance to form the government here, but it won't fall into our laps. I don't underestimate the Tories, believe me; Davis is a formidable opponent. But if we win the confidence of the people, we'll win their votes." Rae's position was seen as that of a pragmatic socialist who had a chance to attract voter attention. He garnered support from 11 caucus members including former leader Donald C. MacDonald as well as many party insiders and the unions. MacDonald said of Rae's candidacy, "I have yet to meet anyone who is not an NDPer who has reacted favorably to the idea of Bob Rae as leader."

Arrayed against Rae were Richard Johnston and Jim Foulds. Johnston was viewed as a more left wing candidate. A former social worker, he had a forceful personality and a competitive nature. He said that he would focus on party reform and party growth. He cited the Manitoba New Democrats who won under Howard Pawley with just as many party members but only 1/8 the size of the population. He said, "We've got to decentralize, develop local issues, increase membership... there's a lot of work to be done." He was supported by three caucus members, Jim Renwick, Floyd Laughren and Ross McClellan.

Jim Foulds, a former teacher from Northern Ontario had been a member of the party for ten years and had the most political experience. He was the party's deputy house leader and had acted as critic for education, resources, and energy. However he was seen as an outsider with small chance of success. His platform focused on northern issues such as establishing a Crown corporation in the forest industry and a public takeover of Inco.

== Convention ==
The convention was held at the Harbour Castle convention centre on the weekend of February 5–7, 1982. There were 3,400 people in attendance of which 2,100 voted for the leadership. Delegates were chosen in each provincial riding based on a slate system. Riding members voted so that a majority voted to send delegates who would vote for a single candidate. This caused some friction amongst more left-leaning members who felt they would not be selected as delegates because they voiced a minority opinion.

There was little suspense as Rae romped to victory with 64% of the vote on the first ballot. He beat Johnston, who was in second place, by 844 votes. Sylvia Stead of the Globe and Mail said that delegates 'voted for him, not because of his stand on issues or his political experience, but because they believe he can win the elusive prize of government.'

In addition to the leadership vote, party delegates adopted a range of new policies, some of them controversial. These included a government takeover of key industries and opposition to further nuclear power development. They also voted to support equal representation for women on riding executives and for convention delegations, auto import restrictions, a more equitable tax system and the acceptance of donations from small businesses.

== Aftermath ==
Rae's immediate concern was to get a seat in the house. The matter was not resolved until Donald C. MacDonald agreed to retire. Rae won his seat in York South on November 4. In the meantime he sat in the visitor's gallery or toured the province. While Rae achieved only minor success in the 1985 provincial election increasing his party to 25 seats from 21, he was instrumental in bringing down the Tory government in June 1985 when he signed an accord with the Liberals under leader David Peterson to support them in government after defeating the Tories on a motion of no confidence. Five years later, in 1990, he led the New Democrats to their first ever government in Ontario when they won 74 seats.

== Candidates ==
=== Jim Foulds ===
Jim Foulds was the Member of Provincial Parliament (MPP) for Port Arthur. He was first elected in the 1971 provincial election. Before entering politics, he was a teacher.

=== Richard Johnson ===
Richard Johnston was the Member of Provincial Parliament (MPP) for Scarborough West. He was first elected to the Legislative Assembly of Ontario in a 1979 by-election. Before entering politics, he was a social worker.

Endorsements

- MPPs: (3) Floyd Laughren (Nickel Belt), Ross McClellan (Bellwoods), Jim Renwick (Riverdale)

=== Bob Rae ===
Bob Rae was the Member of Parliament (MP) for Broadview–Greenwood. He was first elected to the House of Commons in a 1978 by-election. Before entering politics, he was a lawyer.

Endorsements

- Former leaders (2) Donald C. MacDonald (1953–1970), Stephen Lewis (1970–1978)
- MPPs: (10) Marion Bryden (Beaches—Woodbine), Brian Charlton (Hamilton Mountain), Dave Cooke (Windsor—Riverside), Odoardo Di Santo (Downsview), Tony Grande (Oakwood), Robert W. Mackenzie (Hamilton East), Elie Martel (Sudbury East), Ed Philip (Etobicoke), George Samis (Cornwall), Mel Swart (Welland–Thorold)

== Ballot results ==
Delegate support by ballot
Candidate	1st ballot	
Name	Votes cast	%
Bob Rae	1,356	64.6
Richard Johnston	512	24.4
Jim Foulds	232	11.0
Total	2,100	100.0
