= Renata Ford =

Canadian political candidate (1971–2026)

- Born: Renata Brejniak; December 11, 1970
- Died: July 5, 2026 (aged 55)
- Political party: People's Party of Canada
- Spouse(s): Artur Kisiki (m. 1993; div. 1996) Rob Ford (m. 2000; died 2016)
- Children: 2
- Family: Ford family (by marriage)
- Website: Candidate website (2019 archive)

Renata Ford (née Brejniak; December 11, 1970 – July 5, 2026) was a Canadian political candidate who was the wife of Rob Ford, the mayor of Toronto from 2010 to 2014. During the 2019 Canadian federal election, she stood unsuccessfully for the People's Party of Canada in the riding of Etobicoke North. She was noted for her low public profile during the mayoralty of her husband.

== Early life and family ==
Renata was born as Renata Brejniak to Polish-born parents, Tadeusz and Henryka Brejniak. She attended All Saints Roman Catholic Church in Etobicoke, Toronto, where she first met Rob Ford.

Renata married her first husband, Artur Kisiki, in 1993. They divorced in February 1996. In 2000, she married Rob Ford, and the couple went on to have two children, Stephanie and Douglas. During Rob Ford's mayoral term, Renata was noted for her lack of public appearances. In 2013, CBC News reported that details on her career and age were "among the most closely guarded secrets in Toronto." In 2014, she was 43.

In 2008, Rob Ford was charged with threatening to kill Renata. The charges were withdrawn after the Crown attorney found inconsistencies in Renata's testimony. In 2013, police attended a domestic violence call at the couple's home.

Renata Ford was the aunt of former Ontario MPP and cabinet minister Michael Ford and Krista Haynes.

== Legal issues ==
In 2017, Ford was sentenced to three years of probation, 100 hours of community service, and a $1,100 fine after being found guilty of impaired driving the year prior. In public statements, she spoke of her addiction issues and sobriety since her conviction.

In 2018, Ford started litigation proceedings at Ontario's Superior Court of Justice in a $16.5 million lawsuit against her two brothers-in-law Doug Ford and Randy Ford alleging that they deprived her of income while dealing with the estate of Rob Ford. The dispute included reference to Doug Ford's decision to sell Canadian adhesive label company Deco Labels. In 2018, Ford was ordered to pay $300,000 in overdue legal fees to her lawyer.

== Political career ==
In 2019, Ford ran for political office representing the Toronto riding of Etobicoke North as a candidate for the People's Party of Canada in the federal election. During her campaign, she broke with the People's Party stance against immigration.

She came in fourth, with 2.8% of the vote, losing to Kirsty Duncan.

2019 Canadian federal election: Etobicoke North
Party	Candidate	Votes	%	±%	Expenditures
Liberal	Kirsty Duncan	26,388	61.4	-1.01	$67,270.39
Conservative	Sarabjit Kaur	9,524	22.2	-0.80	none listed
New Democratic	Naiima Farah	4,654	10.8	-1.61	none listed
People's	Renata Ford	1,196	2.8	-	none listed
Green	Nancy Ghuman	1,080	2.5	+1.25	none listed
Canada's Fourth Front	Sudhir Mehta	104	0.2	-	$0.00
Total valid votes/expense limit		42,946	100.0		
Total rejected ballots		565			
Turnout		43,511	58.8		
Eligible voters		73,970			
Liberal hold		Swing		-0.11	
Source: Elections Canada

== Personal life and death ==
Ford lived in Etobicoke with Rob (until he died in 2016) and her two children, Stephanie and Doug. Stephanie would be elected to the executive committee of the Progressive Conservative Party of Ontario in 2026.

Ford died on July 5, 2026, at the age of 55. The brother of Rob Ford, Ontario premier Doug Ford, confirmed her death in a statement to reporters on July 6.

== See also ==
- Ford family
