= Ford family (Canada) =

Canadian political family

- Political family
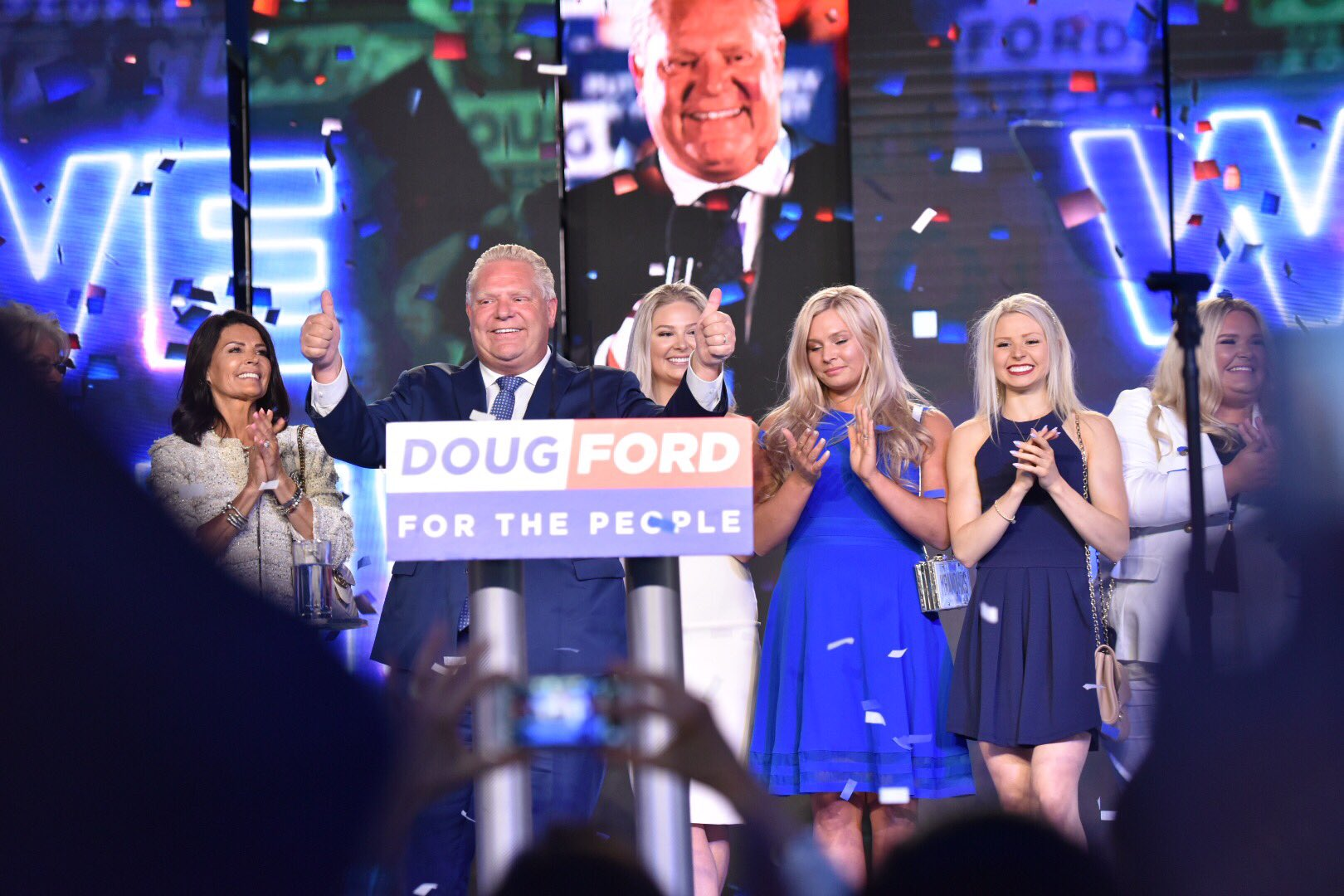
- Doug Ford with his family, 2018
- Current region: Ontario, Canada
- Origin: England
- Titles: Premier of Ontario; Ontario Minister of Citizenship and Multiculturalism; Member of the Ontario Legislative Assembly; Mayor of Toronto; Toronto City Councillor

The Ford family is a Canadian political family, who have English heritage. It includes the former Toronto Mayor Rob Ford and current Ontario Premier and leader of the Progressive Conservative Party of Ontario, Doug Ford.

== Notable members ==
- Doug Ford Sr. (1933 – 2006) Canadian businessman and Ontario politician. He was a Progressive Conservative member of the Legislative Assembly of Ontario from 1995 to 1999 representing the riding of Etobicoke—Humber. He was the father of Rob Ford, and Doug Ford.
- Doug Ford Jr. (born 1964) Canadian politician and businessman who has served as the 26th and current premier of Ontario since June 2018 and leader of the Progressive Conservative Party of Ontario since March 2018. He represents the Toronto riding of Etobicoke North in the Legislative Assembly of Ontario.
- Rob Ford (1969 – 2016) was a Canadian politician and businessman who served as the 64th mayor of Toronto from 2010 to 2014. Before and after his term as mayor, Ford was a city councillor representing Ward 2 Etobicoke North. He was first elected to Toronto City Council in the 2000 Toronto municipal election, and was re-elected to his council seat twice.
- Renata Ford (née Brejniak; 1971 — 2026) politician, People's Party of Canada candidate in 2019. Wife of Rob Ford from 2000 until his death. Ford died in July 2026 and survived by her two children.
- Krista Haynes (née Ford; born 1991) is a Canadian former professional women's American football player. She is a daughter of Doug Ford. She was the captain the Legends Football League team Toronto Triumph. She gained notoriety as a social media influencer during the COVID-19 pandemic aligning herself with the anti-vaccine movement while her father was premier.
- Michael Ford (born Michael Douglas Aldo Ford Stirpe; born 1994) is a Canadian politician who served as the Ontario minister of citizenship and multiculturalism from 2022 to 2025. A member of the Progressive Conservative (PC) Party, he represented York South—Weston in the Legislative Assembly of Ontario from 2022 to 2025. Ford previously served on Toronto City Council from 2016 to 2022. First elected as a Toronto District School Board trustee in 2014, he later won a 2016 by-election for the council seat which was vacated upon the death of Rob Ford, before he was elected as a member of Provincial Parliament in 2022. He is the nephew of Doug Ford and Rob Ford.

Ford family tree

Celia Ford (née McNicol) (1900‑1973) | Ernest Ford (1889‑1933)
Ruth Diane Campbell (1934‑2020) | Doug Ford Sr. (1933‑2006)
Ennio Stirpe | Kathy Stirpe (b. 1961) | Randy Ford (b. 1962) | Doug Ford (b. 1964) | Karla Ford (née Middlebrook) | Rob Ford (1969‑2016) | Renata Ford (1971‑2026)
Michael Ford (b. 1994) | Krista Haynes (née Ford) (b. 1991)

== Ancestry ==
The family have English heritage. The Toronto Sun cited online sources indicating that Doug and Rob Ford's paternal grandfather Ernest Ford was moved from England to Canada in 1902 at the age of 11 as part of the Home Children immigration scheme.

== Offices held ==
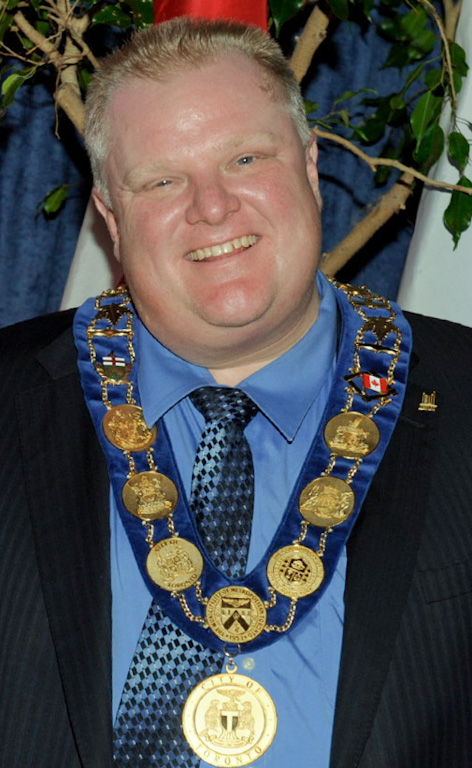
Rob Ford, as mayor of Toronto in 2011

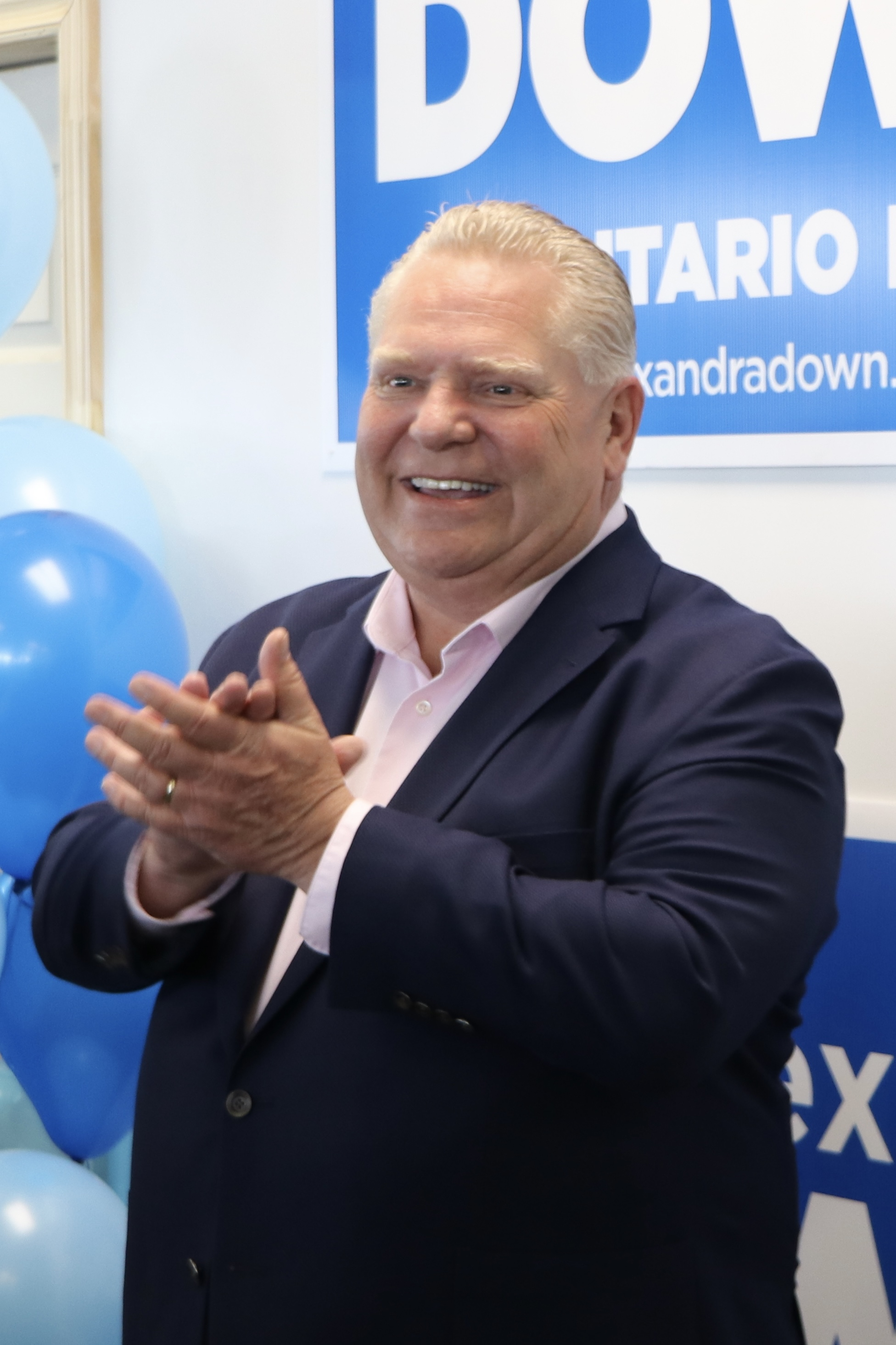
Doug Ford as Ontario Premier in 2022

- Legislative Assembly of Ontario member
  - 1995 – 1996 (Doug Ford Sr.)
  - 2018 – present (Doug Ford)
  - 2022 – 2025 (Michael Ford)
- Premier of Ontario
  - 2018 – present
- Progressive Conservative Party of Ontario leader
  - 2018 – present
- Mayor of Toronto
  - 2010 – 2014
- Toronto city councillor
  - 2000 – 2010, 2014 – 2016 (Rob Ford)
  - 2010 – 2014 (Doug Ford)
  - 2018 – 2022 (Michael Ford)
- Ontario Minister of Citizenship and Multiculturalism
  - 2022 – 2025
- Toronto District School Board trustee
  - 2014 – 2016

== See also ==
- Trudeau family
- Mulroney family
- Hardisty family
- Lewis family
- Layton family
