= Race Against Time (Lewis book) =

2005 book about AIDS in Africa by Stephen Lewis

Race Against Time: Searching for Hope in AIDS-Ravaged Africa
- Author: Stephen Lewis
- Language: English
- Series: CBC Massey Lectures
- Genre: Non-fiction
- Published: October 18, 2005 (House of Anansi Press)
- Publication place: Canada
- Media type: Print (paperback)
- Pages: 216
- ISBN: 978-0-88784-733-2
- Dewey Decimal: 323 22
- LC Class: JC571 .L5235 2005

Race Against Time: Searching for Hope in AIDS-Ravaged Africa is a non-fiction book written by Stephen Lewis for the Massey Lectures. Lewis wrote it in early to mid-2005 and House of Anansi Press released it as a corresponding lecture series began in October 2005. Each of the book's chapters were delivered as a different lecture in a different Canadian city, beginning in Vancouver on October 18 and ending in Toronto on October 28. The speeches were aired on CBC Radio One between November 7 and 11. The author and orator, Stephen Lewis, was at that time the United Nations Special Envoy for HIV/AIDS in Africa and former Canadian ambassador to the United Nations. Although he wrote the book and lectures in his role as a concerned Canadian citizen, his criticism of the United Nations (UN), international organizations, and other diplomats, including naming specific people, was called undiplomatic and led several reviewers to speculate whether he would be removed from his UN position.

In the book and the lectures, Lewis argues that significant changes are required to meet the Millennium Development Goals in Africa by their 2015 deadline. Lewis explains the historical context of Africa since the 1980s, citing a succession of disastrous economic policies by international financial institutions that contributed to, rather than reduced, poverty. He connects the structural adjustment loans, with conditions of limited public spending on health and education infrastructure, to the uncontrolled spread of AIDS and subsequent food shortages as the disease infected much of the working-age population. Lewis also addresses such issues as discrimination against women and primary education for children. To help alleviate problems, he ends with potential solutions which mainly require increased funding by G8 countries to levels beyond what they promise.

Book reviewers found the criticisms constructive and the writing sincere. His style focuses less on numbers and statistics, and more on connecting decisions by UN officials and western diplomats to consequences on the ground in Africa. His eyewitness accounts are said to be candid and emotional. The book spent seven weeks at #1 on The Globe and Mail's Nonfiction Bestseller List. A second edition was released in June 2006. The Canadian Booksellers Association awarded its Libris Award for non-fiction book of the year to Race Against Time and its Author of the Year Award to Lewis in 2006.

== Background ==
At the time of the 2005 publication, the author, Stephen Lewis, aged 67 and living in Toronto, worked as the United Nations Special Envoy for HIV/AIDS in Africa, a position he held since 2001. Previously he worked as the deputy director of United Nations Children's Fund (1994–99), as the Canadian ambassador to the UN (1984–88), and as leader of the Ontario New Democratic Party (1970–79). After Lewis optimistically accepted the Special Envoy position he became increasingly distraught by the devastation he witnessed. Already a skilled orator, he became more vocal on the topic. He founded the Stephen Lewis Foundation, hosted Oprah Winfrey as she toured Africa, and was the subject of two award-winning documentaries by The Nature of Things, entitled Race Against Time and The Value of Life. Meanwhile, he was invested as a Companion of the Order of Canada, awarded the Pearson Medal of Peace, and named Canadian of the Year (2003) by Maclean's magazine. In 2005, he was invited to deliver the annual series of Massey Lectures from which the book, Race Against Time, was adapted. He wrote the text in early to mid- 2005 and delivered the lecture series in October when the book was released. Lewis wrote the book, not as an employee of the UN, but as a citizen concerned with the world's response to the AIDS challenge in Africa.

== Content ==
What makes me nearly apoplectic—and I very much want to say this—is that the Bank and the Fund were fully told about their mistakes even as the mistakes were being made. It's so enraging that they refused to listen. ... The fact that poverty became increasingly entrenched, or that economies were not responding to the dogma as the dogma predicted, made no difference.

— Race Against Time, page 16.

The book consists of five chapters, from which the five lectures were derived: Context, Pandemic, Education, Women, and Solutions. Before these chapters are sections titled Preface and Acknowledgments, and afterwards a Glossary section. The book's second edition contains an Afterword section written in May 2006. In the Preface, written by Lewis in August 2005, he states that his preferred genre is the spoken word and that the nature of the topic would not allow him to comprehensively cover every aspect. He justifies his writing by proclaiming himself a devotee to the United Nations and outlines the roles he has held with the organization since 1984. In the first chapter, Lewis tells anecdotes of visits to Africa and other UN-related events like, in 1986, brokering the resolutions from the General Assembly's 13th Special Session. He acknowledges colonialism and Cold War ideologues as historical influences on the African situation, but focuses on the effects of international finance institutions' conditional loans since the late 1980s.

In the second chapter Lewis discusses his history in Africa, beginning in the 1960s as an English teacher in Ghana. He contrasts Africa of the 1960s shedding colonial rule, optimistic in future prospects, with Africa of the 2000s struggling with AIDS and increasingly widespread hunger. He acknowledges the brain drain trend, noting "there are more Malawian doctors in Manchester [England] than in Malawi". In the third chapter Lewis examines how the UN, World Bank, and the International Monetary Fund (IMF) failed to fulfill promises of free access to primary education. In the instances where school entry fees were eliminated, additional fees (e.g. fees for uniforms, books, exams, and registration) had the same effect of limiting access. The fourth chapter elaborates on how women's issues are ignored or dismissed at international conferences and by African governments. Lewis identifies the gender discrimination that occurs even within the UN organization, whose management staff was dominated by males. He links the World Bank and IMF conditions of low social spending on education and healthcare by governments of recipient countries to the rampant spread of AIDS in those same countries. The disease decimated Africa's working age and farming population, leading to famine. He calls on the international financial institutions to pay "reparations" in the form of debt relief.

Lewis concludes that dramatic changes are required to meet the Millennium Development Goals by 2015. In the final chapter, he considers some potential measures that could help in Africa. He laments the shortfalls in funding by G8 countries, despite the continued renewed promises for full funding of Millennium Development Goal implementation. His proposed measures include:

1. the expansion of the Jubilee Coalition to include cancellation of agricultural subsidies;
2. the amalgamation of UN Development Fund for Women, the UN Division for the Advancement of Women, and relevant portions of United Nations Population Fund into one UN agency funded to a similar level as UNICEF;
3. maintenance of the momentum on the World Health Organization's 'three by five' (3 million people treated by 2005) program;
4. addressing revenue shortfall in The Global Fund to Fight AIDS, Tuberculosis and Malaria through donations from private-sector organizations that profit from Africa (e.g. pharmaceutical companies);
5. creating an agency that can provide emergency food aid in a much shorter timeframe than current programs;
6. supporting Jeffrey Sachs' Millennium Village Project;
7. investing in vaccine and microbicide research;
8. eliminating school fees for primary education;
9. using microcredit money pots for women to care for orphans;
10. planning for capacity replacement on a country-by-country, sector-by-sector basis.

== Style ==
The writing style reflects the author's intent to use the text for a lecture series. The narration addresses the audience while guiding it through explanations of the issues and anecdotal illustrations. Lewis' charismatic, eloquent, and energetic oration style is reflected in the writing. The tone has been described as loud and persuasive. One reviewer called it "vintage Lewis – incisive criticism leavened with high-blown rhetoric". The book focuses more upon real-world human experiences, rather than numbers and statistics, in discussing the effect of AIDS in sub-Saharan Africa and the world's response. Lewis' eyewitness accounts are candid and vivid. For example, he recounts tours of hospitals and schools as he explains the dire straits of national health and education sectors, and he describes meetings with diplomats and staff from the UN, World Bank, and IMF as he explains their effect on foreign aid policies. The book is written from an idealistic perspective and, despite the anger and underlying sense of guilt, Lewis remains optimistic. While he was a professional diplomat, his memoir-style reflections on specific people, such as Michel Camdessus, Carol Bellamy, and Thabo Mbeki were called undiplomatic. Despite the book's undiplomatic style, Lewis retained his post as a UN Special Envoy until the term completed in December 2006.

== Publication ==
The book was released on October 18 as Lewis began the Massey lecture series in Vancouver. The second lecture took place in Winnipeg on the 20th, followed by Montreal on the 22nd, Halifax on the 26th, and the final one in Toronto two days later. The series was recorded then aired on CBC Radio One's Ideas between November 7 and 11. At each event Lewis fielded questions from the audience and participated in book signings. The publisher, House of Anansi Press, was on the last year of its contract with CBC to publish the Massey Lecture series; facing a competitive bid from Penguin Books, Anansi aggressively promoted Race Against Time, with Lewis giving interviews to local media and attending receptions. CBC promoted the events nationally. Following an initial printing of 25,000 copies of the book by Anansi, along with the audio CDs produced by CBC Audio, there was a second printing in June 2006 with a new Afterword section.

== Reception ==
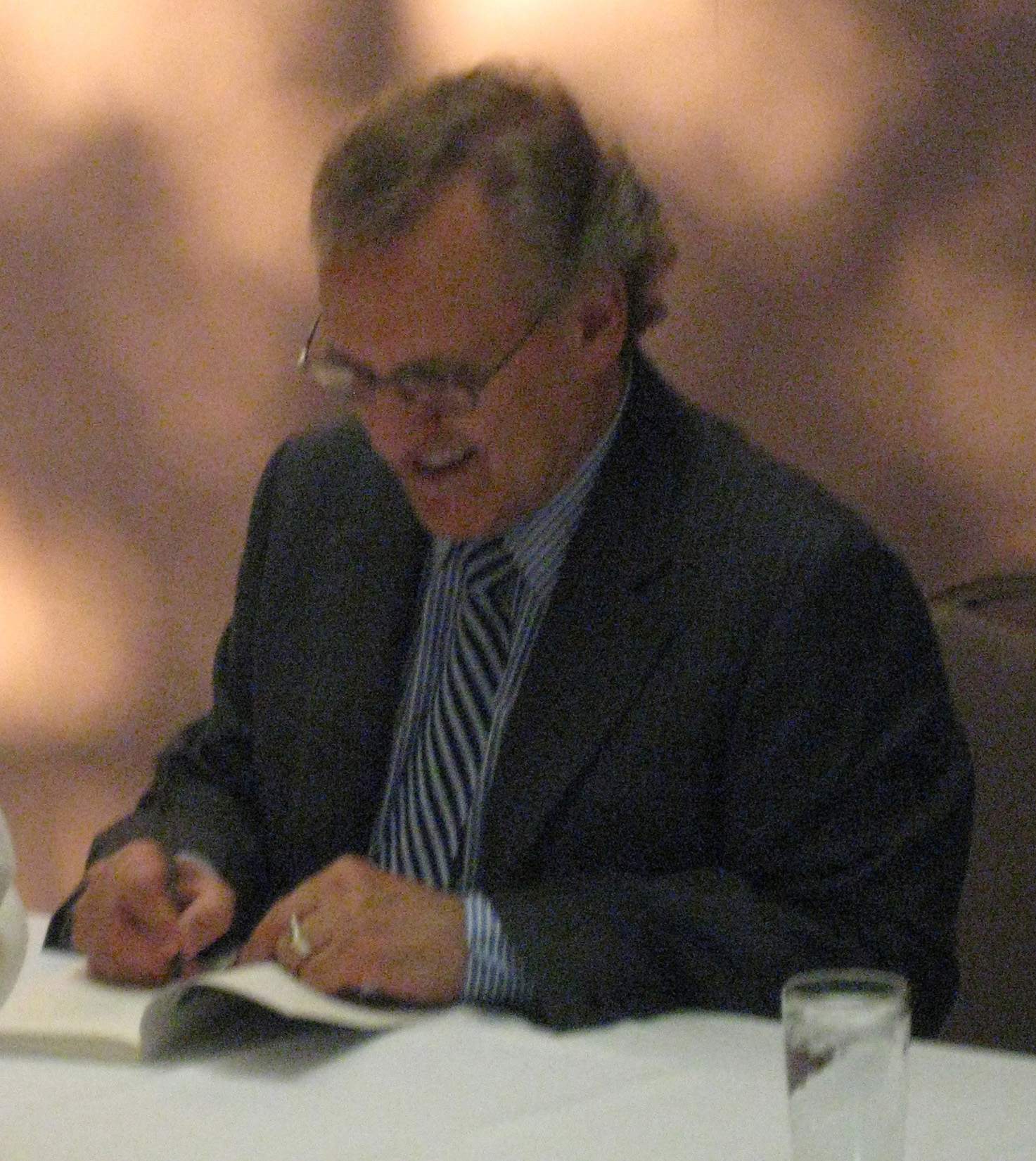
Stephen Lewis signing a copy of the second edition of Race Against Time

In the Canadian market, Race Against Time debuted at #5 on The Globe and Mail's Nonfiction Bestseller List on October 29. It spent seven weeks at #1, and forty weeks in the top ten. Excerpts from the book were published in The Globe and Mail, The Montreal Gazette, and Alternatives Journal. At the Canadian Booksellers Association Libris Awards in June 2006, the book won non-fiction book of the year and Lewis won the Author of the Year Award. The book was short-listed for the Pearson Writers' Trust Prize and the Trillium Book Award.

The book was positively received by reviewers. The prose has been called magnificent, lucid, eloquent, and passionate. Lewis' emotional appeal has been called remarkably candid, sincere, powerful, and moving. Connecting the diplomatic and policy-level work of the UN and World Bank with specific effects on the ground in Africa, and describing the problem of orphans, were among the strengths of the book. Lewis' criticisms are constructive and, since they come from such an ardent multilateralist employed by the United Nations, authoritative. One reviewer questioned several of Lewis' potential solutions as contributing to the same system that consistently fails to address its flaws. The same reviewer identified as the book's weakness its political slant, which ignores corrupt or inefficient African governments and the realities of asking corporations and western governments to take steps against their self-interest, like canceling agricultural subsidies in the case of governments and donating profits in the case of businesses. Several reviewers noted that the book could be used as an effective tool to educate about the HIV/AIDS crisis and the plight of the people of sub-Saharan Africa.

An article in The New York Times, in October 2005, reported on the book's criticism of South Africa's government, singling out President Thabo Mbeki and Health Minister Manto Tshabalala-Msimang. Lewis claimed that the South African programs were half-hearted and confusing; a spokesperson for the Health Ministry characterized Lewis as a biased and uninformed judge of South Africa's situation, and countered that they are rapidly expanding treatment programs. In August 2006, as a keynote speaker at the International AIDS Conference in Toronto, Lewis sustained his criticism, calling South Africa's government "still obtuse, dilatory and negligent about rolling out treatment".
