= Mataka =

Mataka is a surname. Notable people with the surname include:

- Bwana Mataka - ruler of Siu (or Siyu) husband of Swahili poet Mwana Kupona
- Elizabeth Mataka - former United Nations Special Envoy for HIV/AIDS in Africa
- Michael Mataka - Zambian police commissioner and former actor
- Willie Mataka - Australian professional rugby league player
