= Richard Johnston (Ontario politician) =

Canadian politician

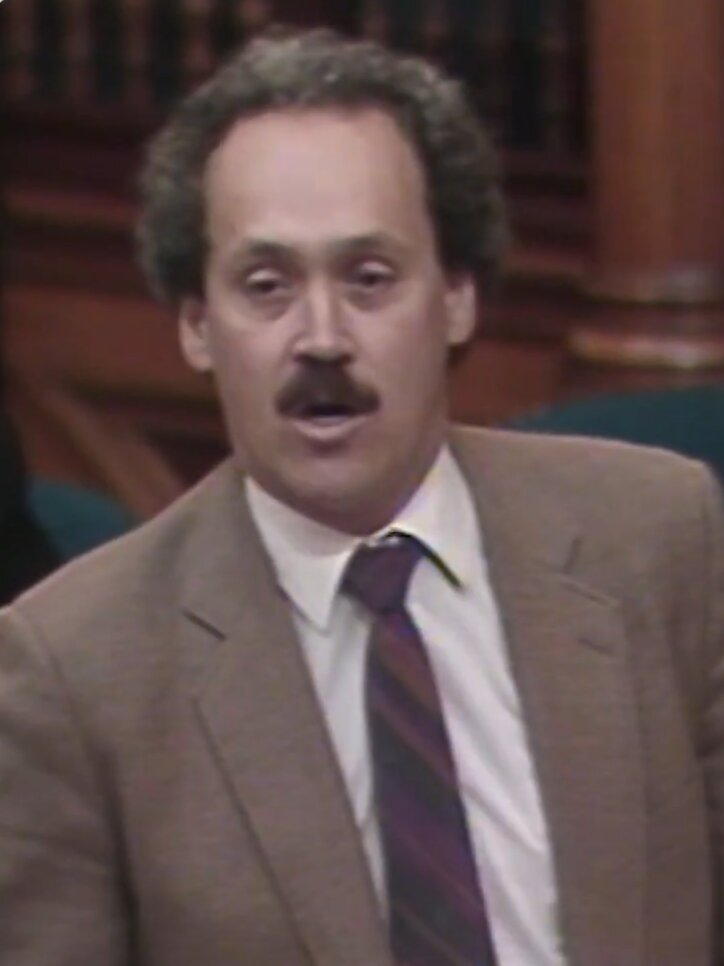
- Johnston in 1986

Ontario MPP
- In office 1979–1990
- Preceded by: Stephen Lewis
- Succeeded by: Anne Swarbrick
- Constituency: Scarborough West

Personal details
- Born: August 8, 1946 (age 80) Pembroke, Ontario
- Party: New Democrat
- Spouse: Vida Zalnieriunas
- Education: Trent University
- Profession: Social worker

Richard Frank Johnston (born August 8, 1946) is a retired Canadian provincial politician, educator and administrator.

== Background ==
Johnston was born in Pembroke, Ontario and grew up in Peterborough. As a young man he was active in the Anglican church and at one point considered becoming a priest. In 1964, Johnston enrolled at Trent University being the second person to register at the opening year of the university. He also worked at Trent as an administrator and counsellor. In 1967 he moved to Montreal to write fiction and poetry because as he said, "I couldn't afford Paris." After that he moved to Whitby where he became a social worker specializing in the elderly. He was the founding executive director of Community Care in Durham Region.

Johnston and his wife operate a vineyard and winery in Prince Edward County.

== Politics ==
Johnston's first association with politics was in the 1970s when he worked as a campaign organizer for Stephen Lewis in Scarborough West. He was the campaign manager for the 1977 election.

When Lewis left politics, Johnston ran to succeed him as the NDP Member of Provincial Parliament (MPP) for Scarborough West, winning election to the Legislative Assembly of Ontario in a 1979 by-election. Johnston was re-elected three times before he retired in 1990. The only time he faced a serious challenge was in 1981, when he defeated Progressive Conservative John Adams by 375 votes.

He crusaded for improved benefits to the poor and disabled by attempting to live for a month on a "welfare diet" in 1982, limiting his food budget to that of the average person on welfare.

Johnston ran in the 1982 NDP leadership convention to succeed Michael Cassidy. He characterized himself as a 'rank-and-file' candidate who was more in tune with the grassroots of the party in contrast with Bob Rae who had the support of leaders in the party and the trade union movement. Johnston received support from the left wing of the party including MPPs Floyd Laughren, Jim Renwick and Ross McClellan. Johnston promoted a strong anti-nuclear stand and was proponent of nationalizing key industries such as the banks, Bell Canada and natural resource companies such as Inco's mining and smelting operations. On February 7, 1982, Rae won on the first ballot with 64.5% of the vote beating Johnston by 844 votes. Johnston was magnanimous in defeat saying of Rae, "a leader with an unparalleled capacity to turn a phrase and turn on a crowd. I will be proud to serve in the Legislature with Bob Rae as my leader."

In the legislature, Johnston served as chair of the NDP caucus and chair of the social development committee during the 1985 to 1987 minority legislature in which the NDP held the balance of power. Johnston, unlike Rae, had originally supported a coalition government with the Liberal Party following the election of 1985.

In 1983, Johnston moved a resolution to declare Ontario a nuclear weapons-free zone but it was defeated, a decision that moved him to tears. In 1987 he introduced a private members bill on the same issue and it was passed with support of all three parties. Only 2 Liberals and 7 Conservatives opposed it. He travelled to Nicaragua to help build a school and medical facility. In 1987, he presented a report to the legislature, Toward a New Ontario, which recommended an overhaul of the existing social assistance system.

In 1990, Johnston decided to retire from politics. He said that after suffering a heart attack in 1984 he wanted to pursue a career that was easier on his health.

== After politics ==
Following his departure from politics, Johnston returned to academia serving as chair of the Ontario Council of Regents for the Ontario Colleges of Applied Arts and Technology from 1991 to 1995. He then served as president of the First Nations Technical Institute on the Tyendinaga Mohawk Territory from 1995 until 1998 as well as a member of Trent University's board of directors. Johnston served as president of Centennial College in Scarborough from 1998 until 2004.

In 1995 Johnston and his spouse purchased a farm 5 km West of Wellington in Prince Edward County, Ontario. They started By Chadsey's Cairns, one of the original wineries founded in "The County" in the 1990s, and continue to run the operation to this day.

In 2006, he was appointed to the board of trustees for OPSEU's pension trust.
