= Jim Brown (Ontario politician) =

Canadian politician

Ontario MPP
- In office 1995–1999
- Preceded by: Anne Swarbrick
- Succeeded by: Riding abolished
- Constituency: Scarborough West

Personal details
- Born: July 23, 1943 Toronto, Ontario, Canada
- Died: January 31, 2020 (aged 76) Ontario, Canada
- Party: Progressive Conservative
- Spouse: Lena Bethune
- Children: 1
- Occupation: Businessman

James Gary Brown (July 23, 1943 – January 31, 2020) was a politician in Ontario, Canada. He was a Progressive Conservative member of the Legislative Assembly of Ontario from 1995 to 1999 who represented the east Toronto riding of Scarborough West.

== Background ==
Brown was educated at York University and Ryerson Polytechnical Institute, receiving a Bachelor of Arts degree, an MBA, and a diploma in Business Administration. He was the office manager of the Toronto Telegram in 1971, and became a founding member of the Toronto Sun Publishing Co. the same year. He was a lecturer at Ryerson and Seneca College and the University of Toronto from 1971 to 1974 and was later a prominent member of Normandy Manufacturing and Republic Goldfields, Minefinders Corp. He also coached the Toronto Marlborough Girls' Hockey Club and was president of the Scarborough Girls' Hockey League.

== Politics ==
Brown ran for the Ontario legislature in the 1990 provincial election, but finished a distant third in Scarborough West against New Democrat Anne Swarbrick. He ran again in the 1995 election and defeated Swarbrick by about 2,500 votes. During his time in office he served as Parliamentary Assistant to the Minister of Correctional Services, Robert Runciman.

Brown also served as co-chair of Harris's "Ontario Crime Control Commission" along with Gerry Martiniuk and Bob Wood.

Brown was known as one of the more socially conservative members of the PC caucus. He led a movement to ban squeegee kids from the streets of Toronto. He said "I think Toronto is becoming the squeegee capital of the world. I think we're squeegee heaven. You are going to see more and more violence and they are certainly getting more and more aggressive."

In November 1998, he attracted controversy by claiming that prostitution rates regularly increased in Toronto during the city's Santa Claus Parade. He said during a radio interview that the annual parade was without a doubt the busiest day of the year for the city's prostitutes. He said "This is sick -- the fact that mom and the kids go watch the parade and dad can go and fool around," he declared. "Obviously something's wrong. We're not getting the message through." Premier Harris declared the comment as idiotic and shortly after Brown resigned from the Crime Control Commission. He also lost his job as parliamentary assistant. He was replaced by fellow MPP Toni Skarica.

In 1996, the Harris government reduced the number of provincial ridings from 130 to 103. This change forced a number of sitting MPPs to face one another in the 1999 provincial election. Brown ran against Liberal incumbent Gerry Phillips in the new riding of Scarborough—Agincourt, and lost by about 3,000 votes.

On October 8, 1999, Brown was appointed to the Ontario Rental Housing Tribunal. Brown died on January 31, 2020.
