= Paula Donovan =

AIDS and women rights activist

Paula Donovan is an American AIDS and women's rights activist. She is the co-executive director with Stephen Lewis of AIDS-Free World, an international advocacy organization that works to promote more urgent and effective global responses to HIV/AIDS. In recognition of her work in HIV/AIDS advocacy, Donovan received the Salem Award for Human Rights and Social Justice in 2005 and an alumni humanitarian award from Fairfield University in 2007.

Donovan is also an advocate for women's rights. She called for the United Nations to create a UN agency for women with financial and political clout. Her efforts and those of others resulted in the UN General Assembly passing a resolution in 2010 which supported a new consolidated body, UN Women – to be headed by an under-secretary-general – to deal with issues concerning women. The resolution merged the UN Development Fund for Women, the Division for the Advancement of Women, the Office of the Special Adviser on Gender Issues and the UN International Research and Training Institute for the Advancement of Women (UN-INSTRAW).

Donovan previously served as a Senior Advisor in the office of the United Nations Secretary General's Special Envoy for AIDS in Africa and is a 20-year veteran of international development, women's rights and HIV/AIDS. In the early '90s, she worked at UNICEF and ran the global advocacy campaign for breastfeeding. Later, she became chief aide to UNICEF's deputy executive director, and spent four years in Kenya as East and Southern Africa's Regional AIDS advisor for UNICEF.

== Education ==
Donovan earned both her Bachelor of Arts in English in 1977 and Masters in corporate and political communications in 1988 from Fairfield University.
