= Morris Lewis =

Canadian trade unionist (1888–1950)

- Born: Mojżesz Łoś (Moishe Losz); 1888; Świsłocz, Congress Poland (now Belarus)
- Died: February 4, 1950 (aged 61–62)
- Other name: Moishe Lewis
- Political party: Jewish Labour Bund
- Spouse: Rose Lazarovitch (Róża Lazarowicz)
- Children: David Lewis
- Relatives: Stephen Lewis (grandson); Avi Lewis (great-grandson); Michele Landsberg (granddaughter-in-law); Daniel Libeskind (grandson-in-law); Naomi Klein (great-granddaughter-in-law)

Morris Lewis (born Mojżesz Łoś, sometimes known as Moishe Lewis, 1888–1950) was a Polish-Jewish labour activist in eastern Europe and Canada.

== Life and work ==
A tanner by trade, Losz was born and raised in Świsłocz in Congress Poland (now a part of modern-day Belarus). He was the chairman of the Jewish Labour Bund in Świsłocz, The Bund was both an active political party and a Jewish, Socialist labour movement. It was preoccupied in changing the system that was at the roots of low pay and dangerous, harsh working conditions.

When the Russian Civil War and the Polish-Soviet War were at their fiercest, in the summer of 1920, Poland invaded, and the Bolshevik Red Army counter-attacked. Świsłocz was on the Polish-Russian border and was occupied by the Soviets in July 1920. Losz openly opposed the Bolsheviks and would later be jailed by them for his opposition. He barely escaped with his life. When the Polish army recaptured Świsłocz on August 25, 1920, they falsely accused five Jewish locals of being spies and executed them. Realising that he was not safe under either regime, and the prospects for the future of his family were bleak, he left for Canada in May 1921, to work in his brother-in law's clothing factory in Montreal, Quebec.

Losz anglicized the family name to "Lewis" and saved up enough money to send for his family within a few months.

Losz, now Lewis, resumed his labour activism in Canada becoming involved with the Arbeiter Ring (Workmen's Circle). He was Secretary of the Canadian Jewish Labour Committee, a labour and civil rights organization, for several decades.

In 1947, Lewis and Kalmen Kaplansky spearheaded "The Tailors Project" by the Workmen's Circle and Jewish Labour Committee to bring European Jewish refugees to Montreal to work in the needle trades. They were able to do this through the federal government's "bulk-labour" program that allowed labour-intensive industries to bring European displaced persons to Canada, in order to fill those jobs. For Lewis' work on this and other projects during this period, the Montreal branch was renamed the Moishe Lewis Branch, after he died in 1950. The Jewish Labour Committee also honored him when they established the Moishe Lewis Foundation in 1975.

== Descendants ==
His son David Lewis would become a labour lawyer and leading figure in the Co-operative Commonwealth Federation and then leader of the federal New Democratic Party. His grandson Stephen Lewis was leader of the Ontario New Democratic Party in the 1970s and later Canada's ambassador to the United Nations. His great-grandson is current NDP leader Avi Lewis, a former journalist who also made documentaries with his wife Naomi Klein.
