= Mulroney family =

Canadian political family

Mulroney
- Political family
- Coat of Arms granted to Brian Mulroney by the Canadian Heraldic Authority
- Current region: Florida; Ontario; Quebec
- Origin: Quebec
- Titles: Prime Minister of Canada
- Connected members: Jessica Brownstein

The Mulroney family is a Canadian political family originating from Quebec, of Irish and Serbian origin. The family includes the 18th prime minister of Canada Brian Mulroney.

== Members ==
- Brian Mulroney, 18th Prime Minister of Canada
  - Mila Mulroney, Progressive Conservative political campaigner, wife of Brian Mulroney
  - Caroline Mulroney, former Ontario provincial Cabinet minister, daughter of Brian and Mila
  - Ben Mulroney, television host, son of Brian and Mila
    - Jessica Mulroney, fashion stylist, wife of Ben Mulroney
  - Mark Mulroney, banking executive, son of Brian and Mila
  - Nicholas Mulroney, businessman, son of Brian and Mila

=== Family tree ===
Mila Mulroney (née Pivnički) (b. 1953)	Brian Mulroney (1939–2024)
Caroline Mulroney (b. 1974)	Ben Mulroney (b. 1976)	Jessica Mulroney (b. 1980)

== See also ==
- Trudeau family
- Ford family (Canada)
- Lewis family
- Layton family
