= Ilana Landsberg-Lewis =

Canadian human rights lawyer and nonprofit executive

Ilana Naomi Landsberg-Lewis (born 1965) is a Canadian labour and human rights lawyer, activist and non-profit executive who served as executive director of the Stephen Lewis Foundation. In 2026, she was appointed chief executive officer of Rainbow Railroad.

== Early life and education ==
Landsberg-Lewis was born in 1965 into a Canadian political and activist family. She is the daughter of diplomat and politician Stephen Lewis and journalist Michele Landsberg. She grew up in Toronto in a household deeply engaged in social justice and political debate.

She attended the University of Toronto, where she earned a Bachelor of Arts degree. She earned her law degree from Osgoode Hall Law School.

== Career ==
=== United Nations and legal work ===
Landsberg-Lewis trained as a labour and human rights lawyer and worked internationally on women’s rights and equality issues. She spent several years with the United Nations Development Fund for Women (UNIFEM), working on the implementation of the Convention on the Elimination of All Forms of Discrimination Against Women (CEDAW) and supporting grassroots women’s organizations.

=== Stephen Lewis Foundation ===
In 2003, Landsberg-Lewis co-founded the Stephen Lewis Foundation with her father, Stephen Lewis, to support community-based responses to HIV/AIDS in sub-Saharan Africa.

She served as executive director from 2003 to 2020, playing a central role in shaping the foundation’s strategy and operations.

According to The Globe and Mail, Landsberg-Lewis helped maintain and expand the foundation’s focus on grassroots, community-led responses to the AIDS epidemic, particularly emphasizing the role of women in affected communities.

The foundation has emphasized initiatives such as the Grandmothers to Grandmothers Campaign, which supports African grandmothers raising children orphaned by AIDS.

=== Rainbow Railroad ===
In January 2026, Landsberg-Lewis was appointed chief executive officer of Rainbow Railroad, an international organization that assists LGBTQI+ individuals facing persecution and displacement.

== Honours and recognition ==
Landsberg-Lewis has received several honours for her work in human rights and international development, including recognition as one of Canada’s Top 25 Women of Influence and a YWCA Woman of Distinction.

== Personal life ==
A member of the Lewis family, Landsberg-Lewis is the daughter of politician and diplomat Stephen Lewis and journalist Michele Landsberg, and the sister of New Democratic Party of Canada leader Avi Lewis and casting director Jenny Lewis. She was previously married to Lorraine Segato, a Canadian singer-songwriter.
