= Theo Sowa =

Ghanaian writer, human rights activist and consultant (born 1957)

Theo Sowa CBE
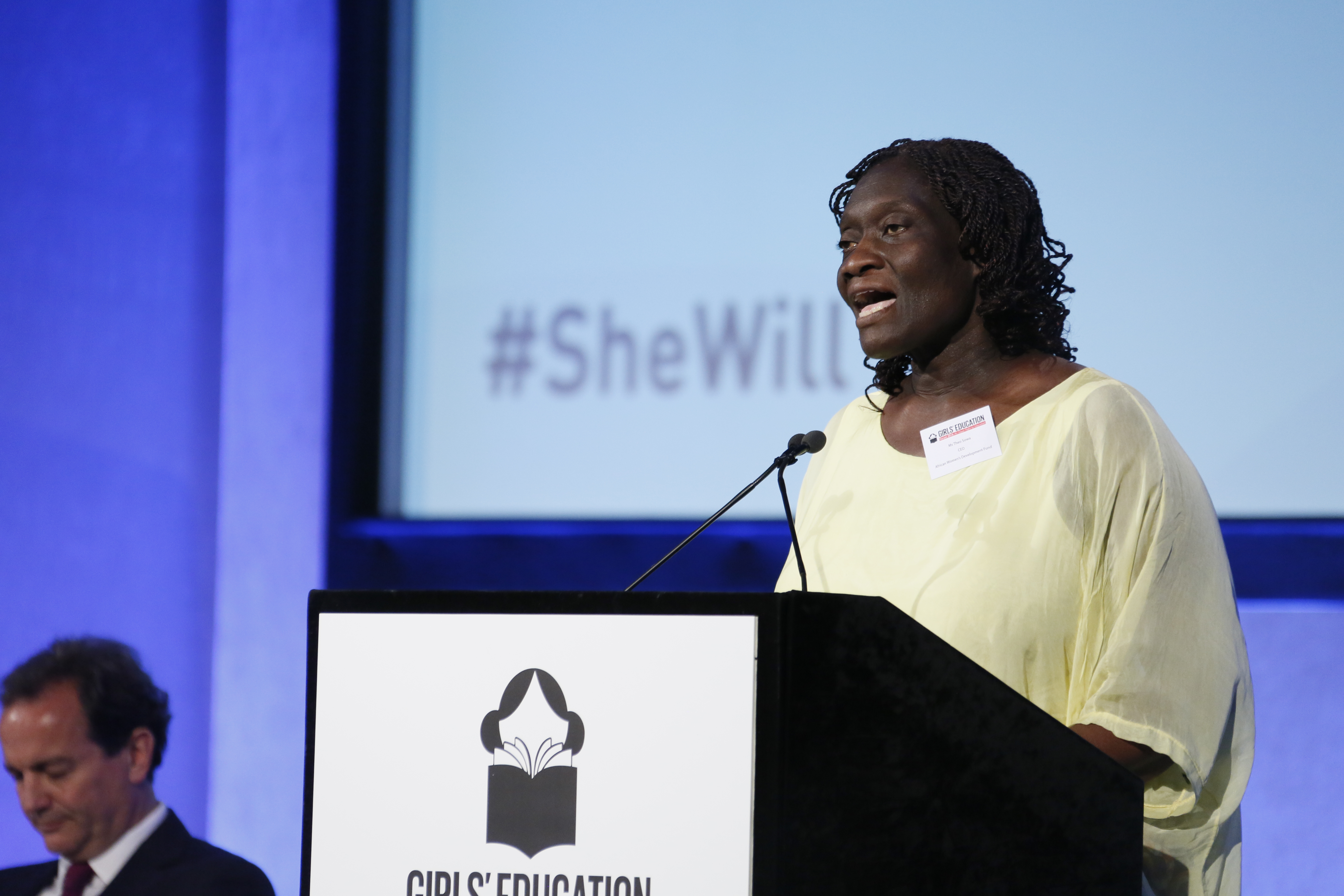
- Born: 1957 (age 68–69); Cape Coast, Ghana
- Education: University of Sussex
- Occupations: Writer; Human rights activist; consultant; Television presenter
- Years active: 1967–present
- Known for: Activism; Fundraising; Journalism; CEO of African Women's Development Fund
- Political party: Non-partisian

Theo Sowa CBE (born 1957) is a Ghanaian-born independent adviser working on a wide range of international issues with a focus on social development issues and has spoken publicly on a number of socio-political issues. She has worked with a number of organisations, including UNICEF, Stephen Lewis Foundation, the African Union, DfID, and UNDP, among others, and is currently CEO of the African Women's Development Fund. Her work has included working with Graça Machel on issues pertaining to the youth as well as contributing and editing a number of publications. Sowa is also a trustee of Comic Relief. In June 2010, Sowa was appointed a Commander of the Order of the British Empire (CBE).

== Early life and education ==
Sowa was born in Cape Coast, Ghana, in 1957, and spent her early life in the United States of America. In 1967 she enrolled into Blessed Sacrament Convent in Brighton, England, and later she went on to become the Head Girl at St Leonards-Mayfield School in Mayfield, Sussex.

Due to her father's occupation, she lived in various African countries, Europe, Asia, as well as the USA. As a result, she experienced racism, sexism, exclusion and denigration at a very early age. However, it seems these only reinforced her leadership skills that continue to mark her life and career. On 17 April 2015, she criticized the Federal Government of Nigeria for its slow response in the release of the 219 Chibok girls who were abducted by Boko Haram on 14–15 April 2014. She called on Muhammadu Buhari, the incumbent President of Nigeria, to take a proactive measure in the fight against insurgency and the release of the girls.

Sowa attended the School of African and Asian Studies at the University of Sussex from 1977 to 1980, and received a bachelor's degree in international relations. At the university, she was interested in women's rights, equality and justice. After university, Sowa pursued this interest and played "The Lady In Purple" in Ntozake Shange's play For Colored Girls Who Have Considered Suicide / When the Rainbow is Enuf. The production was very well reviewed and received. Sowa later earned a master's degree in comparative education at the Institute of Education, University of London, from 1986 to 1988.

== Career ==
She was also involved in television having worked within the BBC, ITV and Channel Four Television (1988–1991) presenting and reporting on social issues. She served as a reporter and presenter on various programmes, including Help, Family Matters, Never on A Sunday, and several documentaries and feature programmes. She served as a development officer in charge of the development National Association for the Care and Resettlement of Offenders, NACRO (1985–1987). Sowa has been a member of ITV Telethon grant-making panel (1990/91), appointed executive board member of Duke of Edinburgh and an executive board member of the Rainer Foundation (1990/1993) and trustee/board member for Conciliation Resources, a conflict resolution NGO (1995/2005). In 1992 she was appointed to the board of the UK National Youth Agency by the then Secretary of State for Education John Patten, a post she resigned when she moved to South Africa to work as part of the Commonwealth Secretariat's Technical Advisory team to the first national multiracial South African elections.

Sowa worked as an international consultant for several years, assisting reputable organizations such as UNICEF, the Stephen Lewis Foundation, the African Union, Department for International Development, and UNDP, among others. She was also chair of the African Grantmakers Network. She was also senior programme advisor on the UN Study on Children and Armed Conflict (the Machel Report) and led the five-year review of the report. At this post, she established relationships and she helped develop policy alongside national and international NGOs, governments across the five continents and their representatives in New York at the UN offices. She led negotiations, both technical and political, for the implementation of the report recommendations in regards to children caught up in conflict with international NGOs, relevant UN agencies, the political organs of the UN and senior governmental representatives to the UN. Her involvement in children's issues resulted in her appointment as an adviser to President Nelson Mandela and Mrs Graça Machel in their work on children and leadership issues for the Global Movement for Children.

As a writer, Sowa has produced a number of policy reports for non-governmental organizations. She has authored articles in learned journals and magazines and was a significant contributors to a book titled The Impact of War on Children. and the co-author of a book on Groupwork with young people. Her most recent publication (February 2010) was as a contributing author and co-editor of a Harvard Law School/UNICEF Innocenti book on Children and Transitional Justice with UNICEF.

== Ongoing work ==
Sowa is the CEO of the African Women's Development Fund. She is also an independent advisor and consultant, specialising in international social development with a particular emphasis on children's rights and protection issues.

Sowa is a trustee of Comic Relief, and chair of Comic Relief's International Grants Committee, a member of the African Advisory Board of the Stephen Lewis Foundation, a member of the British Refugee Council's Leadership Board, a patron of Evidence for Development and a board member of the Graça Machel Trust. Sowa holds a public appointment as a board member of the Charity Commission for England and Wales.

== Awards and recognition ==
She was appointed a Commander of the Order of the British Empire (CBE) in the 2010 Queen's Birthday Honours.

== Publications ==
- Contributing author, Children and Transitional Justice
- Contributing editor, The Impact of War on Children; written with Graca Machel
- Co-editor of a Harvard Law School/UNICEF Innocenti publication, "Children and Transitional Justice"
- Co-author of Groupwork and IT, a training manual for workers with young people.
