= Anne Swarbrick =

Canadian politician

Ontario MPP
- In office 1990–1995
- Preceded by: Richard Johnston
- Succeeded by: Jim Brown
- Constituency: Scarborough West

Personal details
- Born: c. 1952 (age 73–74) Richvale, Ontario (now Richmond Hill, Ontario), Canada
- Party: New Democrat
- Occupation: Civil servant, Non-profit executive

Anne Swarbrick (born c. 1952) is a former politician in Ontario, Canada. She was a New Democratic Party member of the Legislative Assembly of Ontario from 1990 to 1995 who represented the Toronto riding of Scarborough West. She served as a cabinet minister in the government of Bob Rae.

== Background ==
Swarbrick was born in Richvale, a small village north of Toronto, now part of Richmond Hill, Ontario. She went to school at Northview Heights Secondary School and later attended York University but dropped out after a year.

She started working for the federal immigration department eventually becoming a special investigator and adjudicator. She became an executive assistant with the Public Service Alliance of Canada and eventually became president. She was active as a volunteer director for such organizations as the Yellow Brick House (a shelter for battered women), Oxfam-Ontario, and Amnesty International.

== Politics ==
In the 1987 provincial election, she ran as the NDP candidate in the riding of Markham, finishing third against Progressive Conservative Don Cousens and Liberal Gail Newall.

In the 1990 provincial election, she ran to succeed veteran NDP member Richard Johnston in the riding of Scarborough West. The NDP won a majority government and Swarbrick won over half the votes by a margin of 7,819 over her closest opponent. On 1 October 1990, she was named a minister without portfolio responsible for Women's Issues.

In 1991, Swarbrick, who was a pro-choice abortion advocate, spoke out against a new federal law that would have criminalized abortion. In January she helped lead a delegation to the Canadian Senate where the bill was being debated. Eventually the bill failed in the Senate on a tie vote.

Swarbrick underwent surgery for breast cancer in March 1991. She returned to the legislature in June but became involved in a controversy when she and fellow cabinet minister Shelley Martel wrote letters to the Ontario College of Physicians and Surgeons asking for suspension of the license of a physician who had been convicted on sexually assaulting four teenage female patients. Since the letters violated conflict of interest guidelines she and Martel offered their resignations from cabinet.

In a response in the Ontario Legislature, Liberal leader Robert Nixon indicated that while there was no political joy in the statements by Swarbrick and Martel, he felt they were right to offer their resignations, assuring them that their reputation and integrity had in no way suffered. Nixon then asked Premier Rae to comment on these statements.

Premier Rae indicated that because she was minister responsible for women’s issues, Swarbrick’s letter could be seen as a case of a minister trying to influence the decision of a tribunal, and for that reason he said he had accepted her resignation. In the case of Martel’s letter, written on constituency office stationary in support of a constituent who had complained about the case, the Premier said he wanted to consider the matter further before making a decision.

In a further question, Nixon asked whether the Premier would reconsider his acceptance of Swarbrick’s resignation, and on that basis the Premier did not accept the resignation of either Swarbrick or Martel.

As Swarbrick's treatments of chemotherapy and radiation continued to take their toll, she eventually resigned her position on 11 September 1991 in order to focus on her recovery. Regaining her health, Swarbrick was again appointed to cabinet as Minister of Culture, Tourism and Recreation on 3 February 1993.

During her time as minister she undertook a wide range of belt-tightening measures. However she did increase grants to the movie industry and supported the Art Gallery of Ontario in bringing the Barnes art collection to Toronto. She also assisted in gaining provincial funding for Willow Breast Cancer Support Canada.

In one of her last acts as minister she granted a licence to allow the bell of the sunken freighter the SS Edmund Fitzgerald to be retrieved to be used for a memorial for the families of the lost sailors. The NDP was defeated in the 1995 provincial election, and Swarbrick lost her seat to Progressive Conservative Jim Brown by 2,557 votes.

=== Cabinet positions ===
Rae ministry, Province of Ontario (1990–1995)
Cabinet post (1)
Predecessor	Office	Successor
Ed Philip (Note: Was Minister of Tourism and Recreation.); Karen Haslam (Note: Was Minister of Culture and Communications.)	Minister of Culture, Tourism and Recreation; 1993–1995	Marilyn Mushinski (Note: Became Minister of Citizenship, Culture and Recreation.); Bill Saunderson (Note: Became Minister of Economic Development, Trade and Tourism.)
Sub-Cabinet Post
Predecessor	Title	Successor
Mavis Wilson	Minister Without Portfolio (1990–1991); Responsible for Women's Issues	Marion Boyd

== After politics ==
After her defeat, Swarbrick obtained her Master of Business Administration at Schulich School of Business, York University specializing in non-profit management. She started working as the executive director of the Canadian AIDS Treatment Information Exchange.

In 2000, she received an award from York University's business school for her "outstanding public contribution". In 2003 she was appointed as the president of the Toronto Community Foundation. In 2009 she became the executive director of Habitat for Humanity (Halton). She went on to become the director of community development. She also helped lead the creation of the Halton Poverty Roundtable and was a member of Halton Region's Housing Advisory Committee. She retired from Habitat For Humanity in 2012.
