= Stephen Lewis Foundation =

Foundation helping with HIV/AIDS

- Abbreviation: SLF
- Formation: 2003
- Founders: Stephen Lewis; Ilana Landsberg-Lewis
- Legal status: Charitable organization
- Headquarters: Toronto, Ontario, Canada
- Region served: Sub-Saharan Africa
- Co-chairs: Stephen Lewis; David Morley
- Executive director: Meg French
- Revenue: C$9.4 million (2023)
- Expenses: C$9.2 million (2023)
- Website: stephenlewisfoundation.org

The Stephen Lewis Foundation (SLF) is a non-governmental organization that champions health and human rights to end AIDS in partnership with community-led organizations across Africa.

== History ==
The foundation was started by Stephen Lewis, a former Ontario Opposition Leader and Canadian ambassador to the United Nations. He first proposed the idea in an interview published in The Globe and Mail newspaper on January 4, 2003, citing the AIDS crisis across sub-Saharan Africa. Several readers responded with financial donations, the first of which arrived before the foundation had been formally established. By the time the foundation's first cheques were mailed out in June 2003 for projects, the donations totaled $275,000. As of 2025, the SLF has raised more than $200 million in support of grassroots organizations at the forefront of the HIV response in Africa.

For his efforts in starting the foundation, Lewis was named as person of the year by Maclean's magazine in 2003 and was awarded the Pearson Peace Medal in 2004. For years, he continued to travel and speak on the foundation's behalf. Lewis's daughter, Ilana Landsberg-Lewis, was the foundation's executive director since its formation in 2003 until 2020, and its African Advisory Board is chaired by Graça Machel.

As of 2020, the executive director has been human rights advocate Meg French who worked previously with UNICEF and the United Nations, and had ties to the foundation since participating in the International AIDS Conference in 2006 when the Grandmothers to Grandmothers Campaign was launched.

== Activities ==
The Stephen Lewis Foundation is mandated to partner with organizations run by and for their own communities. These organizations support children orphaned by AIDS, women, including grandmothers, and children in their care, LGBTIQ communities and people living with HIV across 14 countries in Africa.

On March 7, 2006, the foundation launched the Grandmothers to Grandmothers Campaign to encourage grandmothers in Canada to raise funds and awareness in solidarity with African grandmothers caring for children orphaned by AIDS. More than 40 groups were started across Canada in the first five months of the initiative. The first "Grandmothers to Grandmothers Gathering" took place at George Brown College at the University of Toronto in August 2006, attended by two hundred grandmothers from Canada and 100 from Eastern and Southern Africa. Several groups from the Grandmothers to Grandmothers Campaign were profiled in Grandmother Power, a book by photojournalist Paola Gianturco. The Campaign has now grown into an international solidarity movement, recognized by the 2024 Lions Club International Humanitarian Award.

On September 7, 2013, the foundation hosted a people's tribunal in Vancouver, BC, to shine a light on the discrimination and inequality faced by African grandmothers who are supporting communities and children affected by HIV and AIDS. Six grandmothers from across Eastern and Southern Africa presented personal testimonies to Tribunal judges, including Theo Sowa, Joy Phumaphi and Gloria Steinem.

== Approach to funding ==
The foundation mostly supports grassroots organizations, although on some occasions it has provided larger projects with funding. The SLF's six main areas of work include children and young people, grandmothers, home-based care, support people living with HIV, ending gender-based violence, health and human rights for LGBTIQ communities.

The SLF has supported initiatives in Botswana, the Democratic Republic of the Congo, Eswatini, Ethiopia, Kenya, Lesotho, Malawi, Mozambique, Namibia, Rwanda, South Africa, Tanzania, Uganda, Zambia, and Zimbabwe.

The foundation’s approach to funding is based on the principle that community-led organizations are best poised to respond effectively to the HIV epidemic. In evaluating funding applications from prospective partners, the foundation places particular emphasis on the involvement of women, community members, and people living with HIV and AIDS in decision-making processes.
