= Michele Landsberg =

Canadian journalist, author, and social activist (born 1939)

Michele Landsberg OC
- Born: 12 July 1939 (age 87); Toronto, Ontario, Canada
- Education: University of Toronto
- Occupations: Journalist, author, and activist
- Spouse: Stephen Lewis (m. 1963; died 2026)
- Children: Ilana; Jenny; Avi
- Relatives: David Lewis (father-in-law); Naomi Klein (daughter-in-law)

Michele Landsberg OC (born 12 July 1939) is a Canadian journalist, author, and feminist social activist. She is known for writing three bestselling books, including Women and Children First, This is New York, Honey!, and Michele Landsberg's Guide to Children's Books. She has written columns for the Toronto Star, The Globe and Mail, and Chatelaine magazine, and was one of the first journalists in Canada to address sexual harassment in the workplace, racial discrimination in education and employment opportunities, and lack of gender equality in divorce and custodial legal proceedings.

In 2005, the Canadian Women's Foundation established the Michele Landsberg Award in her honour, to recognize outstanding young women (ages 18–30) and their accomplishments in media and activism. In 2006, Landsberg was made an Officer of the Order of Canada. As of 2012, she is a member of the Women's College Hospital Board of Directors.

== Personal life ==
Michele Landsberg was born on 12 July 1939, in Toronto, Ontario. She attended high school in North York. In 1957, following her high school graduation, she traveled to Israel, where she spent a year of study and work as a kibbutz volunteer. After returning to Ontario, she attended the University of Toronto, graduating in 1962 with a Bachelor's degree in English and literature. She has also received an honorary degree from McMaster University, and in 2008, the University of Toronto presented her with an honorary doctor of laws degree.

In 1963, Landsberg married Stephen Lewis (1937–2026), who went on to serve as the leader of the Ontario New Democratic Party, the Permanent Representative of Canada to the United Nations, and the inaugural United Nations Special Envoy for HIV/AIDS in Africa. Lewis died in 2026. The couple had three children: activist and administrator Ilana Naomi Landsberg-Lewis, casting director Jenny Leah Lewis, and current New Democratic Party leader Avi Lewis, who is married to writer Naomi Klein.

== Career ==
=== Journalist ===
In 1962, Landsberg joined the staff of The Globe and Mail. She married Stephen Lewis soon after signing on with the Globe, but maintained a byline under her birth name, since her editors preferred that it not be known that she was married to a socialist politician. When her children were born, she resigned her column with the Globe, opting to work on a freelance basis.

In 1971, Landsberg returned to full-time work, serving as a staff writer and editor for Chatelaine magazine. She additionally wrote a regular column for Chatelaine, working with editor and women's rights activist, Doris Anderson. In 1978, Landsberg joined the staff of the Toronto Star, where she served as a regular columnist on feminist issues for over 25 years. During the 1980s, she was living in New York, where she wrote a weekly column on New York life for The Globe and Mail. She eventually retired her column with the Toronto Star in 2005.

=== Author ===
Landsberg has written three bestselling books, including Women and Children First, a collection of her campaigning columns; Michele Landsberg's Guide to Children's Books; and This is New York, Honey!, which is a memoir of her time living as the spouse of Canada's ambassador to the United Nations.

She wrote "The Women's Dayenu", reflecting on the roles of women in Judaism:

"If Eve had been created in the Image of God and not as a helper to Adam, DAYENU

If she had been created as Adam’s equal and not been considered a temptress, DAYENU

If Lot’s wife had been honored for compassion for looking back at the fate of her family in Sodom, and had not been punished for it, DAYENU

If our mothers had been honoured for their daughters as well as for their sons, DAYENU

If our fathers had not pitted our mothers against each other, like Abraham with Sarah and Hagar, or Jacob with Leah and Rachel, DAYENU

If the Just Women in Egypt who caused our redemption had been given sufficient recognition, DAYENU

If Miriam were given her seat with Moses and Aaron in our legacy, DAYENU

If women had written the Haggadah and placed our mothers where they belong in history, DAYENU

If every generation of women together with every generation of men would continue to go out of Egypt,

DAYENU."

=== Activist ===
Landsberg is an outspoken critic of the False Memory Syndrome Foundation and is known for challenging the credentials of foundation advisors, saying that they "are people who really do have powerful motivation to deny the truth".

== Honors and awards ==
Landsberg is the recipient of two National Newspaper Awards, the YWCA Women of Distinction Award, the Dodi Robb Award from MediaWatch, the Robertine Barry Prize for journalism from the Canadian Research Institute for the Advancement of Women, the Florence Bird Award from the International Centre for Human Rights and Democratic Development, several honorary degrees, and the Canadian Governor General's Award in Commemoration of the 1929 Persons Case and Democratic Development, an award acknowledging contributions to equality for women which have resulted in positive change.

== Published works ==
- Landsberg, Michele (1982). Women and Children First, Macmillan of Canada, 239 pages. ISBN 978-0771597268
- Landsberg, Michele (1986). Michele Landsberg's Guide to Children's Books, Penguin Books Australia, 274 pages. ISBN 978-0140071368
- Landsberg, Michele (1987). Reading for the Love of It, Simon & Schuster, 327 pages. ISBN 978-0135798225
- Landsberg, Michele (1989). This is New York, Honey!, McClelland & Stewart, 304 pages. ISBN 978-0771046544
- Landsberg, Michele; and Fran Newman (1993). Children in Crisis, Scholastic Canada, 207 pages. ISBN 978-0590730884
- Landsberg, Michele (2004). The Grubby Pleasures of Gardening, McClelland & Stewart, 240 pages. ISBN 978-0771046575
- Landsberg, Michele (2011). Writing the Revolution, University of Toronto Press, 304 pages. ISBN 978-1897187999

== See also ==
- List of newspaper columnists
