= Elizabeth Mataka =

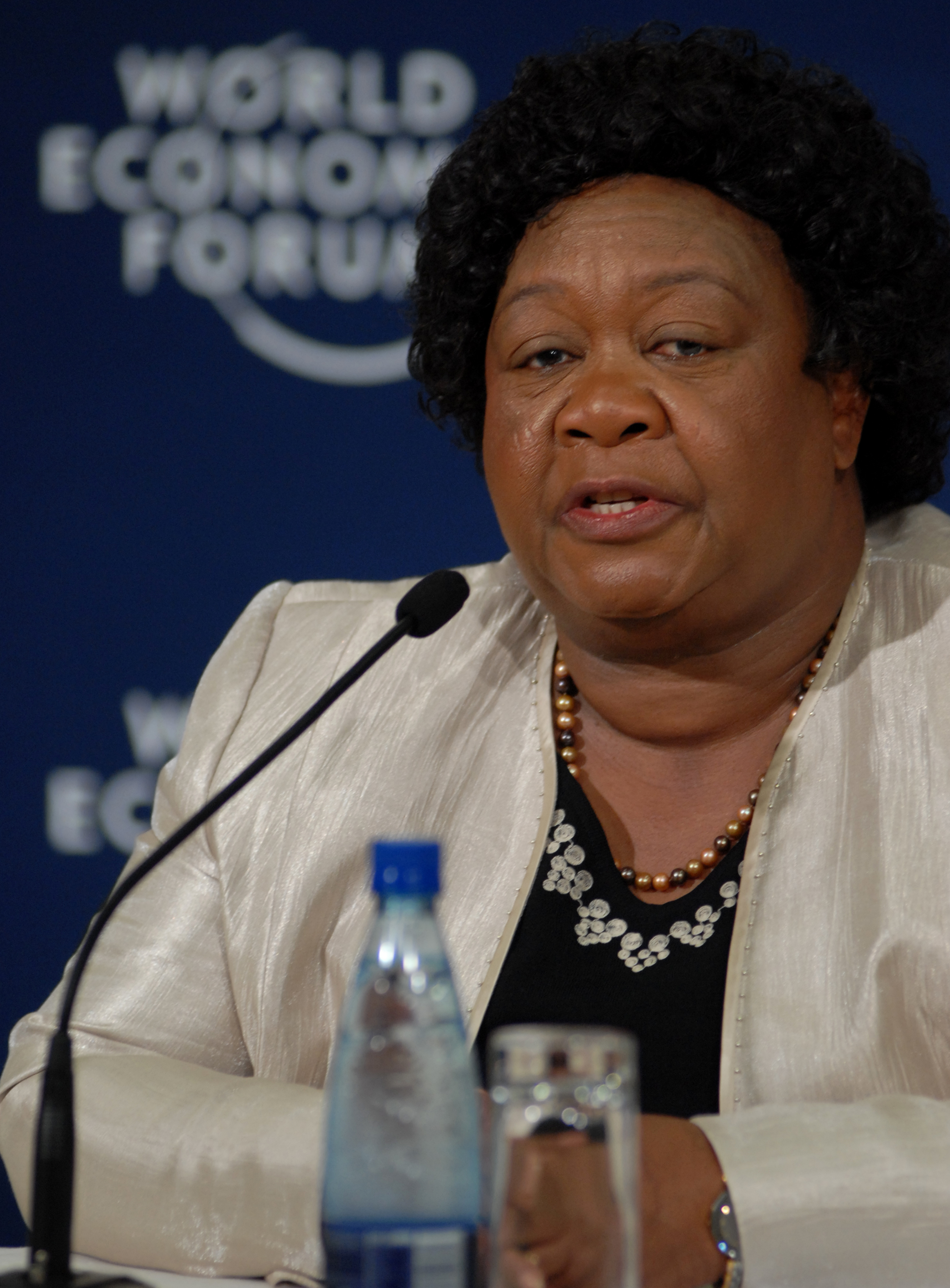
- Mataka attending the 2009 World Economic Forum on Africa

United Nations Special Envoy for HIV/AIDS in Africa
- In office 21 May 2007 – 13 July 2012
- Appointed by: Ban Ki-moon
- Preceded by: Stephen Lewis

Elizabeth Mataka was the United Nations Special Envoy for HIV/AIDS in Africa, as appointed on 21 May 2007 by UN Secretary-General Ban Ki-moon, replacing Stephen Lewis. She served in this position till 13 July 2012. Mataka is a national of Botswana and a resident of Zambia. She served as the vice-chair of the board of the Global Fund to Fight AIDS, Tuberculosis and Malaria.

== Early life ==
Born and raised in Francistown, Botswana, Mataka moved to Lusaka in the late 1960s to study social work at the University of Zambia. After graduating in 1970, she got married. A mother of four children, Mataka helped create Children in Distress, a programme that helped communities deal with AIDS orphans.

== Early career ==
Mataka spent two decades working in the government and the private sector before joining Family Health Trust, a small non-governmental organisation, as executive director.
