= Stephen Lewis =

Canadian politician (1937–2026)

Stephen Lewis CC
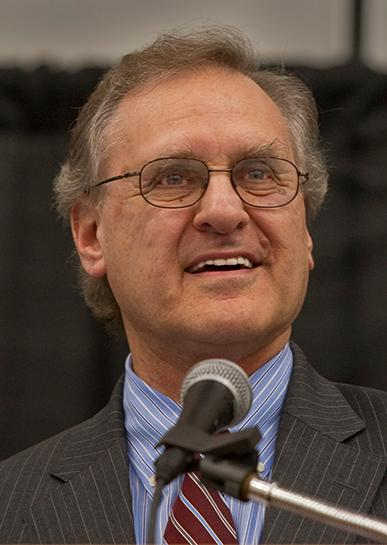
- Lewis in 2009

Canadian Ambassador to the United Nations
- In office September 15, 1984 – July 1988
- Prime Minister: Brian Mulroney
- Preceded by: Gérard Pelletier
- Succeeded by: Yves Fortier

Leader of the Official Opposition in Ontario
- In office October 28, 1975 – April 29, 1977
- Preceded by: Robert Nixon
- Succeeded by: Stuart Lyon Smith

Leader of the Ontario New Democratic Party
- In office October 4, 1970 – February 5, 1978
- Preceded by: Donald C. MacDonald
- Succeeded by: Michael Cassidy

United Nations Special Envoy for HIV/AIDS in Africa
- In office June 1, 2001 – December 31, 2006
- Preceded by: Position established
- Succeeded by: Elizabeth Mataka

Deputy Executive Director of UNICEF
- In office 1995–1999

Member of Provincial Parliament for Scarborough West
- In office September 25, 1963 – November 10, 1978
- Preceded by: New district
- Succeeded by: Richard Johnston

Personal details
- Born: Stephen Henry Lewis; November 11, 1937 Ottawa, Ontario, Canada
- Died: March 31, 2026 (aged 88) Toronto, Ontario, Canada
- Resting place: Pardes Shalom Cemetery, Vaughan, Ontario, Canada
- Party: New Democratic (federal); Ontario New Democratic (provincial)
- Spouse: Michele Landsberg (m. 1963)
- Children: Ilana; Jenny; Avi
- Parent: David Lewis (father)
- Relatives: Lewis family
- Occupation: Politician; diplomat; author; writer; journalist; broadcaster; academic; public speaker; nonprofit executive; activist

Stephen Henry Lewis CC (November 11, 1937 – March 31, 2026) was a Canadian politician, public speaker, broadcaster and diplomat who served as leader of the Ontario New Democratic Party (ONDP) from 1970 to 1978. Elected to the Legislative Assembly of Ontario in 1963 at the age of 26, he became the province's leader of the Official Opposition in 1975. He later served as the Canadian ambassador to the United Nations from 1984 to 1988.

His father, David Lewis, was the leader of the federal New Democratic Party (NDP) during much of the time that Stephen was leader of the provincial party. As member of Provincial Parliament (MPP) for Scarborough West, Lewis led the Ontario NDP into Official Opposition for its first time in over 25 years in the 1975 general election. After politics, he became a broadcaster on CBC Radio and on Toronto's Citytv. In the mid-1980s, he was appointed as Canada's United Nations ambassador by Progressive Conservative Prime Minister Brian Mulroney. He resigned as ambassador in 1988 and worked at various United Nations agencies during the 1990s and the 2000s decade, including as the inaugural United Nations special envoy for HIV/AIDS in Africa. His son Avi Lewis won the 2026 New Democratic Party leadership election two days before Stephen Lewis died.

== Early life and education ==
Lewis was born in Ottawa, Ontario, on November 11, 1937, to Sophie Lewis (née Carson) and David Lewis. He was the grandson of Morris Lewis (1888–1950), a Polish-Jewish activist of the Jewish Bund in Russia and the Jewish Labour Committee in Montreal. His parents gave him the Hebrew name "Sholem", a Yiddish derivation of the Hebrew word shalom, which means peace, because he was born on Armistice Day. From the time he was born, and through his early childhood, his father was the national secretary of the Co-operative Commonwealth Federation (CCF), the predecessor party to the NDP. When his family moved to Toronto in 1950, he attended secondary school first at Toronto's Oakwood Collegiate Institute, and then his final three years of high school at Harbord Collegiate Institute.

In 1956, he entered University College at the University of Toronto (U of T) where he became a member of the Hart House debating committee, and on November 14, 1957, debated the senator and future American president, John F. Kennedy, on the question, "Has the United States failed in its responsibilities as a world leader?" The Senator narrowly beat the Hart House team 204–194. Lewis's performance was considered the highlight of the event, while Kennedy's was flat according to many members in the audience like John Brewin. He spent his third year of university at the University of British Columbia (UBC) before spending his final undergraduate year back at U of T, where he failed to write his final examinations. He went to law school twice in the early 1960s, dropping out of both U of T's and UBC's programs.

== Political career ==
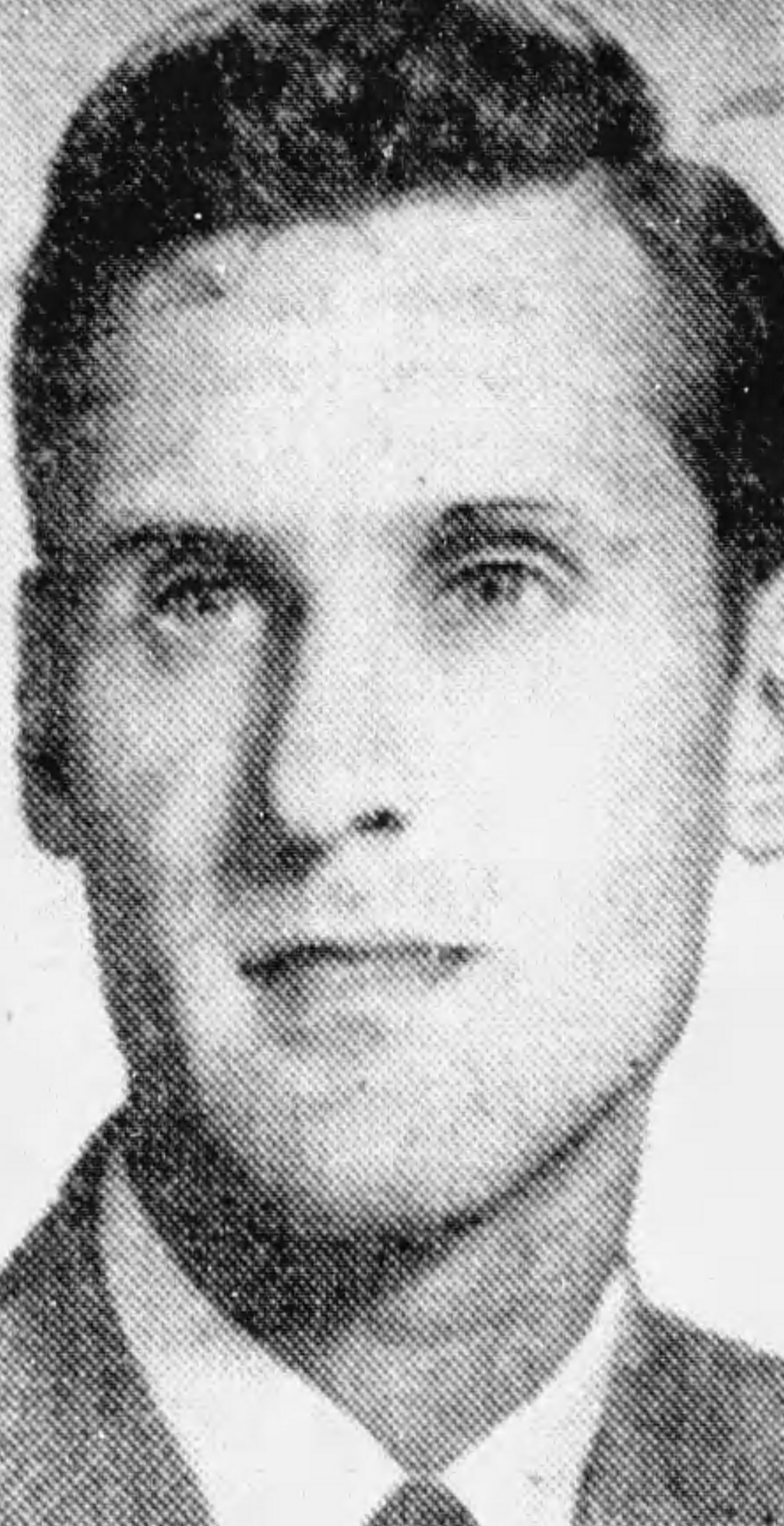
Lewis c. 1963

He left his studies in the 1960s and took up a clerical position with the Socialist International, where he received an invitation to a conference in Ghana. He attended, and instead of returning to Canada, spent more than a year working, travelling, and teaching in various places in Africa. He recalled in his 2005 Massey Lectures that the relatively brief sojourn would be a key influence on his life, especially after the turn of the new millennium.

=== Leader of the Ontario NDP ===
He returned to Canada at the behest of Tommy Douglas, and in 1963, at the age of 26, he was elected to the Legislative Assembly of Ontario. Following the engineered 1970 resignation of Donald C. MacDonald, Lewis was elected leader of the Ontario New Democratic Party. His initial experience at the helm in the 1971 provincial election was a disappointment, with the party slipping from 20 seats to 19.

A radical left-wing group nicknamed The Waffle had gained prominence, with one of its leaders, James Laxer, winning one-third of the vote when he ran to lead the federal NDP in 1971. Lewis felt that The Waffle was threatening the credibility and stability of the party and supported a movement against the group in June 1972 on the basis that it was a party within a party.

In 1974, Lewis supported the Elliot Lake miners and advocated to Ontario Premier Bill Davis for the creation of the Royal Commission on the Health and Safety of Workers in Mines. The commission's recommendations led to the creation of the Occupational Health and Safety Act in 1979.

Lewis led a strong campaign during the 1975 election with his oratory and passion, bringing new supporters to the party. The NDP highlighted issues such as rent control and workplace safety. Each day, Lewis told the story of a different Ontarian in trouble, making the case that this was due to inadequate legislation. Polls showed the NDP surging and the incumbent Ontario Progressive Conservative Party in freefall, and in the course of the campaign, Premier Davis was forced to commit his party to bringing in rent control and other progressive reforms to retain power. When the ballots were counted, the Tories were reduced to a minority government. Lewis's NDP had doubled its seats from 19 to 38, surpassing the Ontario Liberal Party to become the Official Opposition. To some, it appeared that it was only a matter of time before the NDP would form the government. The result was the best in the party's modern history until the Ontario NDP's majority government in 1990.

The next election, in 1977, proved to be a disappointment. The growth of support for the NDP stalled, and while the Tories were kept to a minority, the NDP failed to make any gains. The party was reduced to 33 seats and lost its status as the Official Opposition to the Liberals. In 1978, a frustrated Lewis stepped down as party leader and as a Member of Provincial Parliament.

=== Post-political career ===
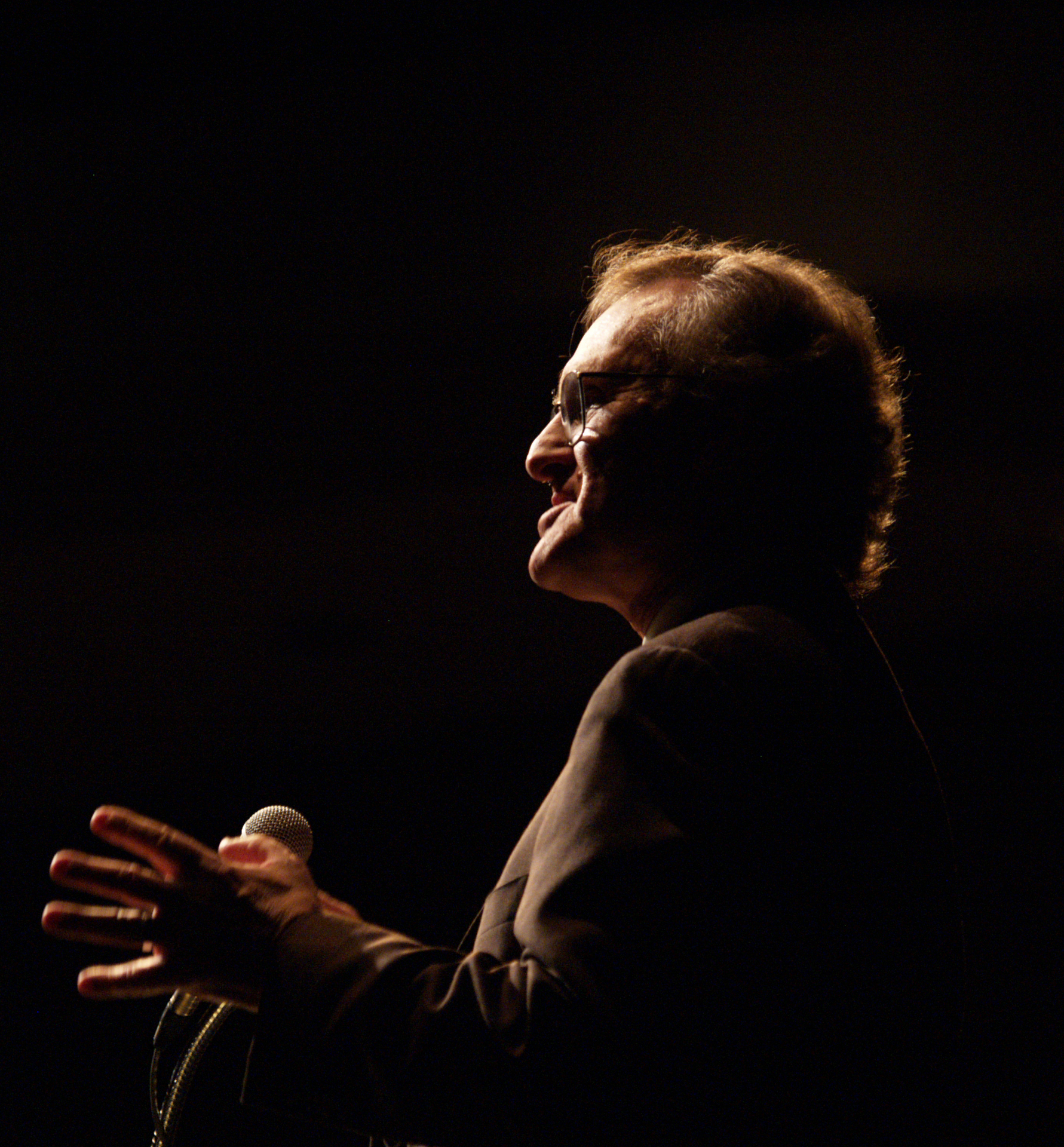
Stephen Lewis, speaking at the University of Alberta, January 30, 2006

NDP Premier Bob Rae appointed Lewis as the special advisor on race relations to the Premier of Ontario; he delivered the report entitled "Stephen Lewis Report on Race Relations in Ontario" in 1992. He declined to run in the 1989 New Democratic Party leadership election. After leaving politics, Lewis continued to campaign for the NDP, including in the 2015 federal election. He also supported the Leap Manifesto.

== Diplomatic career ==
After working for several years as a labour mediator, columnist, and broadcaster, in 1984 Lewis was appointed Permanent Representative of Canada to the United Nations by Governor General Jeanne Sauvé, on the advice of Prime Minister Brian Mulroney and by recommendation from former Ontario Premier Bill Davis. As ambassador, he worked with Mulroney to oppose and denounce apartheid in South Africa. Lewis served at the post until 1988, but continued serving as the Special Advisor to the UN Secretary General on Africa until 1991.

From 1995 to 1999, Lewis was deputy director of UNICEF. In 1993, he worked on the "Graça Machel study", which was the first global study on the impact of armed conflict on children; it was presented at the UN General Assembly in 1996. In 1997, Lewis was also appointed by the Organisation of African Unity to a panel that investigated the Rwandan genocide; the report, entitled Rwanda: The Preventable Genocide, was released in June 2000. From 2001 until 2006, he worked as United Nations Special Envoy for HIV/AIDS in Africa. In this role, he drew attention to the HIV/AIDS crisis and convinced leaders and the public that they have a responsibility to respond. He also spoke at the 2004 Conference on Retroviruses and Opportunistic Infections. As an advocate for Africa, he criticized the World Bank and International Monetary Fund for their debt repayment policies, and accused African governments and the G8 of not doing enough for Africans. He was widely praised for his effectiveness in this role. In 2005, he adapted his Massey Lectures in a book titled Race Against Time, where he describes the disjuncture between what the international community promises and their actions in responding to the pandemic in Africa. Lewis also advocated for environmental causes. He was also a member of the World Health Organization Commission on Social Determinants of Health.

== Outside politics ==
=== Broadcasting ===
After leaving politics, Lewis served as an arbitrator with the Ontario Ministry of Labour and was a commentator on TV station CITY-TV's CityPulse News and CKEY radio in Toronto, and appeared nationally with Dalton Camp and Eric Kierans as part of a weekly political panel on Peter Gzowski's CBC Radio show, Morningside. He returned to the Morningside panel in the late 1980s. In 1982, Lewis won the Gordon Sinclair Award from ACTRA for his commentary on CKEY. In 2006, Lewis participated in the Canadian Songwriters Hall of Fame TV special entitled Words to Music. For his performance in the special, he was nominated for Best Performance or Host in a Variety Program or Series at the 21st Gemini Awards. He also served as an advisor to the PBS TV series Women, War & Peace.

=== Academics ===
In May 2006, Lewis joined the Faculty of Social Sciences at McMaster University as a scholar-in-residence. Also in 2006, he was elected a senior fellow of Massey College of the University of Toronto. He was also a distinguished visiting professor at Ryerson University (now Toronto Metropolitan University) and a senior advisor to Columbia University's Mailman School of Public Health.

=== Stephen Lewis Foundation ===
Lewis was chair of the board of the Stephen Lewis Foundation, a non-profit organization that helps people affected and infected by HIV/AIDS in Africa. The foundation is located in Toronto.

In October 2009, to raise money for the foundation, Lewis helped with a campaign to dare Canadians to do something for Africa called A Dare to Remember. The campaign saw Lewis, along with musician k-os, federal NDP leader Jack Layton, Olympic gold medalist Duff Gibson and many other Canadians, performing various dares for the event. He faced his own personal fears as part of the campaign, and sang live on CBC's The Hour with the band the Arkells.

=== AIDS-Free World ===
In 2007, Lewis and long-time colleague Paula Donovan co-founded AIDS-Free World, a non-profit organization that advocates for more effective global responses to HIV and AIDS.

In 2009, Lewis strongly criticized Pope Benedict XVI's assertion that condom use only makes the AIDS crisis worse.

As a preventative HIV/AIDS strategy, Lewis made a somewhat controversial call for male circumcision when African boys receive the first of two UN-administered measles vaccination shots, so that their recovery progress can be monitored at the time of the second vaccination. Many studies have been conducted into the role circumcision can play in reducing the spread of HIV.

== Personal life and death ==
Lewis had three siblings, and two of them were active and high-ranking officials within the Ontario NDP during the 1980s and 1990s: Michael Lewis was the secretary, and Janet Solberg was the president. His second sister is Nina Lewis-Libeskind, the wife and partner of world-renowned architect Daniel Libeskind.

Lewis married journalist Michele Landsberg in 1963. The couple had three children: Ilana Landsberg-Lewis, Avi Lewis, and Jenny Lewis. Avi is a filmmaker and politician, while Jenny is a casting director. Ilana previously served as executive director of the Stephen Lewis Foundation and was married to Lorraine Segato. Stephen's daughter-in-law, Naomi Klein, is married to Avi and is an author and activist.

In 2021, Lewis publicly revealed that he was undergoing experimental treatment for inoperable abdominal cancer, which recurred three years after surgery for an earlier occurrence of the disease. He died in Toronto on March 31, 2026, at the age of 88, while under hospice care, just two days after his son Avi was elected federal NDP leader. He was paid tribute by people including Prime Minister Mark Carney, federal Official Opposition leader Pierre Poilievre, Manitoba Premier Wab Kinew, British Columbia Premier David Eby, Toronto mayor Olivia Chow, World Health Organization director-general Tedros Adhanom Ghebreyesus, and David Suzuki. His memorial service was held on April 26 at Toronto Metropolitan University's Chrysalis, with over 1,000 in attendance.

== Honours and legacy ==
Known for his strong public speaking skills, Lewis was described as one of the best Canadian political orators of his generation. A lifelong democratic socialist, his speech at the 2016 federal NDP convention in Edmonton was given particular praise.

For his humanitarian work in Africa and the United Nations, governor general Adrienne Clarkson appointed Lewis a Companion of the Order of Canada on October 10, 2002. His investiture into the order was held on October 23, 2003. He delivered the annual Massey Lecture in 2005, and it was published in book form under the title Race Against Time: Searching for Hope in AIDS-Ravaged Africa. The book consists of five lectures that depict the HIV/AIDS pandemic in Africa, critically examining the international community's passivity as a contributing factor.

Lewis was awarded the Pearson Medal of Peace for his public service, and was named the Maclean's Canadian of the Year in 2003. In 2005, Time named him one of the world's 100 most influential people.

In 2006, two new secondary schools in the Toronto area were named after Lewis: Stephen Lewis Secondary School in Mississauga and Stephen Lewis Secondary School in Vaughan. The Mississauga school has a focus on educating students on issues relating to social justice and global citizenship to enhance the Ontario Curriculum.

In 2007, Lewis was invested as a Knight Commander of the Most Dignified Order of Moshoeshoe by King Letsie III of Lesotho.

In 2010, Forbes, in conjunction with their 2010 list of The World's Most Powerful People, asked the feminist playwright Eve Ensler to identify the world's most powerful feminists. She named Lewis as one of her top seven. In 2012, he received Canada's Queen Elizabeth II Diamond Jubilee Medal.

In 2013, the Mark S. Bonham Centre for Sexual Diversity Studies at the University of Toronto presented Lewis with the Bonham Centre Award, recognizing his contribution to the advancement and education of human rights issues surrounding sexual education.

Lewis had 42 honorary doctorates from Canadian and American universities; this is one of the largest numbers held by any Canadian.

== Electoral record ==
1963 Ontario general election: Scarborough West
Party	Candidate	Votes	Vote %
New Democrat	Stephen Lewis	10,534	42.4
Conservative	Joe Krol	8,105	32.6
Liberal	Thomas Somerville	5,495	22.1
Communist	Osmo Lahti	727	2.9
	Total	20,453	

1967 Ontario general election: Scarborough West
Party	Candidate	Votes	Vote %
New Democrat	Stephen Lewis	13,141	47.9
Conservative	Reg Stackhouse	8,406	30.7
Liberal	William Belfontaine	5,874	21.4
	Total	27,421	

1970 Ontario NDP leadership convention

(Held at the Royal York Hotel in Toronto on October 4, 1970.)

Candidate	Votes	Percentage
Stephen Lewis	1,188	64.1
Walter Pitman	642	34.7
Douglas Campbell	21	1.1
Total	1,851	100

1971 Ontario general election: Scarborough West
Party	Candidate	Votes	Vote %
New Democrat	Stephen Lewis	13,104	39.3
Conservative	Richard Kirkup	12,629	37.9
Liberal	Frank Faubert	7,575	22.7
	Total	33,308	

1975 Ontario general election: Scarborough West
Party	Candidate	Votes (Note: 170 out of 172 polls reporting.)	Vote %
New Democrat	Stephen Lewis	15,717	56.1
Conservative	Syd Brown	7,738	27.6
Liberal	Norm Kert	4,422	15.8
Independent	Richard Sanders	133	0.5
	Total	28,010	

1977 Ontario general election: Scarborough West
Party	Candidate	Votes (Note: 184 out of 185 polls reporting.)	Vote %
New Democrat	Stephen Lewis	13,340	54.0
Conservative	Kenneth J. Timney	6,870	27.8
Liberal	Bobby Orr	3,869	15.7
Libertarian	Paul Mollon	476	1.9
Independent	Richard Sanders	167	0.7
	Total	24,722	

== Notes ==
Diplomatic posts
Preceded by Gérard Pelletier	Canadian Ambassador to the United Nations; August 1984 – August 1988	Succeeded by Yves Fortier
Legislative Assembly of Ontario
Preceded by Robert Nixon	Ontario Leader of the Opposition; 1975–1977	Succeeded by Stuart Lyon Smith
New district	Ontario Member of Provincial Parliament for Scarborough West; 1963–1978	Succeeded by Richard Johnston
Party political offices
Preceded by Donald C. MacDonald	Leader of the Ontario New Democratic Party; 1970–1978	Succeeded by Michael Cassidy
