= Krista Haynes =

Canadian former football player and conspiracy theorist

Krista Ford Haynes
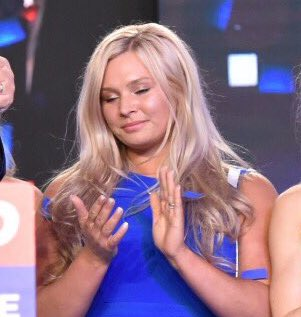
- Haynes in 2018
- Born: Krista Ford; September 13, 1991 (age 35); Etobicoke, Ontario, Canada
- Education: Humber College; York University
- Spouse: David Haynes (m. 2015)
- Father: Doug Ford
- Relatives: Doug Ford Sr. (grandfather); Rob Ford (uncle); Michael Ford (cousin)
- Family: Ford family

Krista Ford Haynes (née Ford; born September 13, 1991) is a Canadian former professional women's American football player. She is a daughter of Ontario Premier Doug Ford and niece of former Toronto Mayor Rob Ford. She was the captain of the Toronto Triumph, a team in the Legends Football League.

Over the course of the COVID-19 pandemic in Ontario, Haynes has shared COVID-19 misinformation and anti-vaccine and anti-mask sentiment, and has been critical of COVID-19 vaccine passports.

== Lingerie Football League ==
Haynes, who was a student at Humber College, was one of more than 100 women who tried out for the first team when the league's Toronto franchise first opened for business in 2011.

Press coverage of Haynes' tryout routinely mentioned that she was the niece of then Toronto mayor Rob Ford and the daughter of then city councillor Doug Ford.

According to technology journalist Patrick Seitz, the league had lacked stars in its early seasons, so the limited press coverage the league received treated it solely as a "peep show". He asserted that Haynes and Angela Rypien, the daughter of former Super Bowl MVP Mark Rypien, were two potential stars the league could offer in its 2011 season.

Team management chose Haynes as the team's first captain. She also served as the team's marketing manager, responsible for seeking sponsorships. The team did not perform well when it started to compete with more experienced teams in the league. Players voiced concern that they had been issued unsafe equipment, and that the most senior members of the team's coaching staff lacked the experience to train them to compete safely. Following its loss in its first non-exhibition game the team's management fired the one member of the coaching staff who was experienced, who team members felt had the experience to serve as head coach, and four of her fellow team members. In response Haynes and 15 remaining team members resigned.

The Torontoist quoted Haynes' announcement of her resignation from her Facebook page, where she quoted Malcolm X, "A man who stands for nothing will fall for anything" to explain her stand on principle.

The Toronto Star interviewed the founder of the Lingerie Football League about Haynes' resignation, who claimed he had spoken with her uncle Rob Ford, who agreed with him that his niece's resignation was a mistake. Although seasons tickets had already gone on sale in March 2012 the league cancelled the 2012 season in April 2012. CTV News cited Haynes resignation as a factor when explaining the cancellation of the season; however, the Triumph were not included in the cancellation, which included only the U.S.-based teams.

== Comments on sexual assault ==
On August 29, 2012, Haynes stirred controversy through a tweet she sent, an hour after Toronto Police had advised women of a recent outbreak of sexual assaults. Haynes' tweet said: "Stay alert, walk tall, carry mace, take self-defence classes & don't dress like a whore." Section 88 of the Criminal Code lists mace as a "prohibited and restricted weapon". Haynes' comment was compared to those of Michael Sanguinetti, a Toronto area police officer whose widely criticized safety suggestion to college students that "women should avoid dressing like sluts not to be victimized" triggered the worldwide SlutWalk phenomenon.

== Views on COVID-19 ==
Haynes has been critical of COVID-19 vaccines and vaccine passports and has expressed anti-mask sentiments. She has also expressed disdain for vaccine mandates. Her husband was placed on unpaid leave by the Toronto Police Service due to his lack of vaccination. She has compared public health protocols and vaccine mandates to the Holocaust and the civil rights movement.

In a series of posts on Instagram, Haynes has made unsubstantiated criticisms of the safety of COVID-19 vaccines and their effectiveness, including the benefits of vaccine boosters, in which she claimed that "every booster you take is going to weaken your natural immunity." She has also expressed the incorrect belief that vaccination causes viral shedding and encouraged her Instagram followers to "rise up" and continue "holding the line for medical freedom". On and around Remembrance Day, Haynes suggested that people should wear remembrance poppies instead of masks in Canada, saying that "If you're headed into a store today and you find it more important to put on a mask than a poppy, rethink your priorities because there have been men and women who have fought bravely and died for our freedoms that we seem to be just handing over today, so please think about that." She later suggested that the Canadian government should have sent every Canadian household a Bible instead of information cards on COVID-19 vaccines.

Haynes believes the Canadian government is conspiring to remove freedoms from citizens while lying to the public about potential vaccine side effects. Haynes added that vaccine information could be disseminated to the Chinese governments and the FBI. She has also shared information against childhood vaccination.

Haynes campaigns against the COVID-19 lockdowns and shares anti-vaccine content on social media. Robyn Urback, writing in The Globe and Mail, has criticized the mainstream media for under reporting her campaign, in the context of Haynes' father being the Premier of Ontario. In January 2022, Haynes attended a rally welcoming trucks in Freedom Convoy 2022, making their way through the Greater Toronto Area. She was seen carrying a flag that said "Fuck Trudeau".

By December 2021, NOW Toronto and The Globe and Mail had published articles covering her position.

== Personal life ==
Ford is married to David Haynes, a Toronto Police Service officer and bodybuilder. In November 2021, he was put on unpaid leave from the service for refusing to receive a COVID-19 vaccine.

On February 15, 2022, Haynes' father Doug Ford acknowledged "family rifts" relating to COVID-19 during a public press conference.

In December 2022, Haynes was conspicuously missing from the family photograph used by Doug Ford on the family Christmas card.

== See also ==
- Ford family (Canada)
