= Scarborough West (provincial electoral district) =

Former provincial electoral district in Ontario, Canada

Ontario electoral district

Defunct provincial electoral district
- Legislature: Legislative Assembly of Ontario
- District created: 1963
- District abolished: 1996
- First contested: 1963
- Last contested: 1995

Demographics
- Census division: Toronto
- Census subdivision: Scarborough

Scarborough West was a provincial electoral district in Ontario, Canada. It was created prior to the 1963 provincial election and eliminated in 1996, when its territory was incorporated into the ridings of Scarborough Southwest and Scarborough Centre. Scarborough West riding was created from part of the former riding of York—Scarborough. It was in the former borough of Scarborough.

Four Members of Provincial Parliament represented the riding during its history. The most notable was Stephen Lewis who was leader of the New Democratic Party of Ontario from 1970 to 1978.

== Boundaries ==
The riding was created in 1963 through an amendment to the Representation Act. It formed the southwest part of the former riding of York—Scarborough. The riding was bordered by Lawrence Avenue to the north, Victoria Park Road to the west, Lake Ontario to the south and Kennedy Road to the east.

In 1975, the boundary was significantly altered. The western boundary remained Victoria Park Road and the southern boundary of Lake Ontario were retained. The northern boundary was moved south to Eglinton Avenue. The eastern boundary was redrawn as follows: from Eglinton Avenue, the boundary followed the CNR right-of-way located east of Kennedy Road south and then curving south east to Midland Avenue at Danforth Road. It followed Midland Avenue south to Kingston Road where it turned southwest following Kingston to the Rosetta McLain Gardens park. It then turned south until it met the lake.

In 1987 the boundary was altered again. The northern border was moved north to Lawrence Avenue. The eastern boundary followed the CNR right-of-way east of Kennedy Avenue south to Eglinton Avenue. It then moved west following Eglinton to Kennedy Road. It then followed Kennedy south to Lake Ontario.

== Members of Provincial Parliament ==
Scarborough West
Assembly	Years	Member	Party
Created from York—Scarborough in 1963
27th	1963–1967	Stephen Lewis	New Democratic
28th	1967–1971	Stephen Lewis	New Democratic
29th	1971–1975	Stephen Lewis	New Democratic
30th	1975–1977	Stephen Lewis	New Democratic
31st	1977–1979	Stephen Lewis	New Democratic
31st	1979–1981	Richard Johnston	New Democratic
32nd	1981–1985	Richard Johnston	New Democratic
33rd	1985–1987	Richard Johnston	New Democratic
34th	1987–1990	Richard Johnston	New Democratic
35th	1990–1995	Anne Swarbrick	New Democratic
36th	1995–1999	Jim Brown	Progressive Conservative
Sourced from the Ontario Legislative Assembly
Merged into Scarborough Southwest and Scarborough Centre after 1996

== Electoral results ==
=== 1987 electoral boundaries ===
1995 Ontario general election
Party	Candidate	Votes	%	±%
Progressive Conservative	Jim Brown	11,773	43.13	+22.54
New Democratic	Anne Swarbrick	9,216	33.76	–17.41
Liberal	John Marchildon	5,326	19.51	–3.76
Natural Law	Cynthia Marchand	387	1.42	–
Independent	Frank Meyers	254	0.93	–
Libertarian	George J. Dance	214	0.78	–0.65
Green	Eric Stark	129	0.47	–
Total valid votes		27,299	98.95	
Total rejected, unmarked and declined ballots		291	1.05	–0.32
Turnout		27,590	64.33	–0.89
Eligible voters		42,890		
Progressive Conservative gain from New Democratic		Swing		+19.97
Source: Elections Ontario

1990 Ontario general election
Party	Candidate	Votes	%	±%
New Democratic	Anne Swarbrick	14,340	51.16	+4.92
Liberal	Joe Pacione	6,521	23.27	–11.75
Progressive Conservative	Jim Brown	5,769	20.58	+7.12
Family Coalition	Stefan Slovak	996	3.55	–0.04
Libertarian	George J. Dance	401	1.43	–0.24
Total valid votes		28,027	98.63	
Total rejected, unmarked and declined ballots		390	1.37	+0.78
Turnout		28,417	65.21	+3.75
Eligible voters		43,576		
New Democratic hold		Swing		+8.34
Source: Elections Ontario

1987 Ontario general election
Party	Candidate	Votes	%	±%
New Democratic	Richard Johnston	13,330	46.25	–6.94
Liberal	Joe Pacione	10,094	35.02	+15.19
Progressive Conservative	Brian Clark	3,881	13.46	–11.27
Family Coalition	Stephen Jalsevac	1,035	3.59	–
Libertarian	George J. Dance	483	1.68	–
Total valid votes		28,823	99.40	
Total rejected ballots		239	0.82	–0.08
Turnout		29,062	61.61	+1.14
Eligible voters		47,173		
New Democratic hold		Swing		–11.06
Source: Elections Ontario

=== 1975 electoral boundaries ===
1985 Ontario general election
Party	Candidate	Votes	%	±%
New Democratic	Richard Johnston	12,889	53.19	+11.35
Progressive Conservative	Kurt Christensen	5,994	24.73	–15.54
Liberal	Anthony D. Judd	4,806	19.83	+3.49
Independent	John W. MacMillan	544	2.24	–
Total valid votes		24,233	99.32	
Total rejected, unmarked, and declined ballots		221	0.90	+0.09
Turnout		24,454	60.47	–0.89
Eligible voters		40,440		
New Democratic hold		Swing		+13.44
Source: Elections Ontario

1981 Ontario general election
Party	Candidate	Votes	%	±%
New Democratic	Richard Johnston	10,019	41.84	–0.91
Progressive Conservative	John Adams	9,644	40.27	+9.38
Liberal	Barbara Fava	3,914	16.35	–9.25
Independent	Kevin James	369	1.54	–
Total valid votes		23,946	99.32	
Total rejected, unmarked, and declined ballots		205	0.85	
Turnout		24,151	59.17	
Eligible voters		40,813		
New Democratic hold		Swing		–5.14
Source: Elections Ontario

Ontario provincial by-election, April 5, 1979 Resignation of Stephen Lewis
Party	Candidate	Votes	%	±%
New Democratic	Richard Johnston	8,247	42.75	–11.28
Progressive Conservative	John Larke	5,960	30.90	+2.95
Liberal	William Belfontaine	4,937	25.59	+10.06
Social Credit	Gary R. Beamish	107	0.55	–
Independent	Helen Obadia	39	0.20	–
Total valid votes		19,290	99.41	
Total rejected ballots		114	0.59	+0.05
Turnout		19,404	48.92	–14.78
Eligible voters		39,662		
New Democratic hold		Swing		–7.11
Source: Elections Ontario

1977 Ontario general election
Party	Candidate	Votes	%	±%
New Democratic	Stephen Lewis	13,350	54.03	–3.36
Progressive Conservative	Kenneth J. Timney	6,906	27.95	+1.78
Liberal	Bobby Orr	3,837	15.53	–0.41
Libertarian	Paul R. Mollon	442	1.79	–
Independent	Richard Sanders	172	0.70	+0.21
Total valid votes		24,707	99.46	
Total rejected ballots		133	0.54	+0.17
Turnout		24,840	63.70	–6.39
Eligible voters		38,994		
New Democratic hold		Swing		–2.57
Source: Elections Ontario

1975 Ontario general election
Party	Candidate	Votes	%	±%
New Democratic	Stephen Lewis	15,815	57.39	+18.44
Progressive Conservative	Syd Brown	7,212	26.17	–12.28
Liberal	Norm Kert	4,393	15.94	–6.65
North American Labour	Richard Sanders	135	0.49	–
Total valid votes		27,555	99.63	
Total rejected ballots		102	0.37	–0.11
Turnout		27,657	70.10	–3.40
Eligible voters		39,456		
New Democratic hold		Swing		+15.36
Source: Elections Ontario

=== 1963 electoral boundaries ===
1971 Ontario general election
Party	Candidate	Votes	%	±%
New Democratic	Stephen Lewis	13,092	38.96	–9.16
Progressive Conservative	Richard (Dick) Kirkup	12,922	38.45	+7.87
Liberal	Frank Faubert	7,594	22.60	+1.29
Total valid votes		33,608	99.52	
Total rejected ballots		162	0.48	–0.36
Turnout		33,770	73.50	+4.39
Eligible voters		45,948		
New Democratic hold		Swing		–8.52
Source: Elections Ontario

1967 Ontario general election
Party	Candidate	Votes	%	±%
New Democratic	Stephen Lewis	13,225	48.12	+4.64
Progressive Conservative	Reginald Stackhouse	8,404	30.58	–2.80
Liberal	William Belfontaine	5,856	21.31	–1.32
Total valid votes		27,485	99.16	
Total rejected ballots		234	0.84	–0.08
Turnout		27,719	69.11	+5.90
Eligible voters		40,109		
New Democratic hold		Swing		+3.72
Source: Elections Ontario

1963 Ontario general election
Party	Candidate	Votes	%
New Democratic	Stephen Lewis	10,641	43.47
Progressive Conservative	Joe Krol	8,170	33.38
Liberal	Thomas Sommerville	5,538	22.63
Communist	Osmo R. Lahti	128	0.52
Total valid votes		24,477	99.08
Total rejected ballots		228	0.92
Turnout		24,705	63.21
Eligible voters		39,086	
New Democratic pickup new district.			
Source: Elections Ontario

== See also ==
- List of Ontario provincial electoral districts
- Canadian provincial electoral districts
