= Hardisty family =

Canadian family of commerce and politics

Hardisty
- Political family
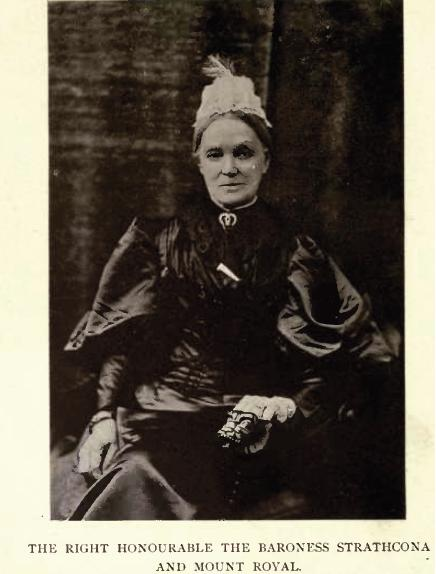
- Isabella Smith (née Hardisty), the Baroness Strahcona and Mount Royal in 1903
- Place of origin: Rupert’s Land
- Founded: Unknown before 1822; 204 years ago
- Founder: Richard Hardisty
- Titles: List: Baroness Strathcona; Premier of Alberta; Knight; Canadian senator; chief factor

The Hardistys are a Canadian family of commerce and politics of English, Scottish and indigenous North American heritage.

The first Hardisty in Canada was a Hudson's Bay Company employee from London, England named Richard. He married Margret (a.k.a. Marguerite) Sutherland in a civil ceremony, rather than à la façon du pays (in the local tradition), as Margret parents' had. Margret’s father was a Scot in the employ of the Hudson's Bay Company (H.B.C.) and her mother was indigenous. She was born in the Columbia district, probably at Fort Vancouver. After a long career moving between fur trade posts Richard and Margret retired to Lachine, near Montreal.

Richard and Margret's first son, born circa 1822 probably at Waswanipi House, was named William Lucas. William, like his father and maternal grandfather, worked for the H.B.C. his entire adult life. In 1857 William married Mary Anne Allen in Fort Simpson. William was put in charge of several H.B.C. posts and districts in the Pacific and Arctic basins, and was chief factor of the Mackenzie River district from 1868 until his retirement ten years later.

Richard and Margret's second son, born circa 1832 probably at Fort Mistassini, was named Richard Charles. He married Eliza McDougall, the daughter of George McDougall, the Methodist missionary who had founded missions at Fort Edmonton, Victoria Settlement, and Morley, Alberta. Richard went on to become the chief factor of Fort Edmonton and later a senator.

Sisters to William and Richard were Mary and Isabella Hardisty. Mary married Joseph McPherson of the H.B.C. in Labrador. Isabella likewise married James Grant of the H.B.C in 1852, but the next winter Isabella failed to accompany him when he was sent to a northern post. Instead she stayed at the post where Donald Smith was the chief factor. In 1854 Isabella give birth to a daughter, Maggie Smith. At the advice of Governor Simpson, Donald Smith married Isabella in 1859, on the assumption that her first marriage had been invalid since her father did not have the authority to perform marriages in Labrador. For this second marriage, Donald Smith officiated his own wedding on the supposition that he was a justice of the peace and had permission to perform marriages from the Anglican Bishop of Newfoundland. This later troubled Smith, as he rose to become Canada’s richest man, now Lord Strathcona, as part-owner of the H.B.C., the Canadian Pacific Railway, and the Bank of Montreal. The couple endured gossip and had the marriage solemnized on several occasions.

William Lucas’s daughter, Isabella, known as Belle, was born in 1861 at Fort Resolution. After catching scarlet fever in the Red River Settlement at age six, went to live with her grandparents at Lachine and then attended the Wesleyan Female College in Hamilton, Ont. before returning to her family in the northwest. In 1883 she visited her aunt and uncle, Eliza and Richard Charles in Calgary. There, Belle Hardisty became integrated into the emerging WASP elite and married James A. Lougheed, the future senator and knight, in 1884 in Calgary. Her mixed-raced heritage was not a secret in Calgary but she did not publicly identify herself with indigenous causes. They built the Beaulieu mansion in Calgary and became the leading socialites, philanthropists, and arts patrons in Calgary. Their grandson, Peter Lougheed was premier of Alberta from 1971 to 1985.
