= United Nations Special Envoy for HIV/AIDS in Africa =

The United Nations Special Envoy for HIV/AIDS in Africa (abbreviated as UNAIDS) is a diplomatic position that deals with the deadly disease on the continent where the issue is most pressing. It conducts the world's most extensive data collection on HIV epidemiology and is the only cosponsored Joint Program in the United Nations system.

According to the UN website: "In 2011 there were 32 per cent fewer AIDS-related deaths on the continent than in 2005, and also 33 per cent fewer new infections in 2011 compared to 2001." It also says that 70% of people with AIDS live on the African continent.

== Special envoys ==
- 2001–2006: Stephen Lewis
- 2007 on: Elizabeth Mataka
- 2012: Asha-Rose Migiro
- 2013: Speciosa Wandira-Kasibwe
