= New Democratic Party Shadow Cabinet of the 45th Parliament of Canada =

List of New Democratic Party critics, 2025–present

NDP Shadow Cabinet of the 45th Canadian Parliament
- Fourth party of the House of Commons (unrecognized)
- 2025–present
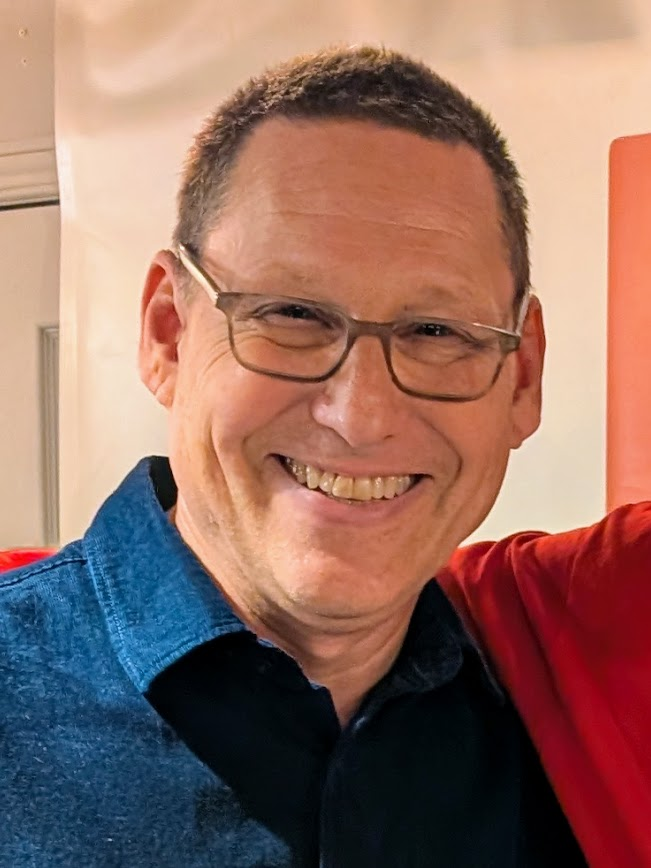
- Avi Lewis in 2025
- Date formed: May 28, 2025

People and organizations
- Party leader: Don Davies (interim) (2025–2026); Avi Lewis (2026–present)
- Parliamentary leader: None (2025–2026); Don Davies (2026–present)
- Deputy leader: Alexandre Boulerice (2025–2026)
- House leader: Alexandre Boulerice (2025–2026); Heather McPherson (2026–present)
- No. of ministers: 5
- Ministers removed: 2
- Member party: New Democratic
- Status in legislature: No official status; 5 / 343 (1%)

History
- Election: 2025
- Legislature term: 45th Parliament of Canada
- Predecessor: 2021–2025 NDP Shadow Cabinet

This is a list of members of the New Democratic Party Shadow Cabinet of the 45th Canadian Parliament. Positions in the shadow cabinet were announced on May 28, 2025, following the federal election on April 28 the same year. From May 5, 2025 to March 29, 2026, the cabinet was led by Don Davies, the interim leader of the New Democratic Party who was appointed to temporarily lead following the resignation of Jagmeet Singh. The NDP was reduced to only seven seats in the 2025 general election, and each member of the NDP caucus has been assigned several portfolios. Following the 2026 New Democratic Party leadership election, the shadow cabinet is organized by Avi Lewis, although he does not have a seat in the House of Commons. Lewis's shadow cabinet was announced on April 10, 2026, with Don Davies being appointed as the parliamentary leader.

== List of critics ==
Image	Name	Riding	Portfolio	Tenure start	Tenure end
	Don Davies	Vancouver Kingsway	Interim leader of the New Democratic Party	May 28, 2025	March 29, 2026
	Don Davies	Vancouver Kingsway	Parliamentary leader of the New Democratic Party	March 29, 2026	Current
	Don Davies	Vancouver Kingsway	Finance	May 28, 2025	Current
	Don Davies	Vancouver Kingsway	Industry and Jobs	May 28, 2025	Current
	Don Davies	Vancouver Kingsway	Intergovernmental Affairs	May 28, 2025	Current
	Alexandre Boulerice	Rosemont—La Petite-Patrie	Deputy leader of the New Democratic Party	May 28, 2025	April 27, 2026
	Alexandre Boulerice	Rosemont—La Petite-Patrie	House leader of the New Democratic Party	May 28, 2025	April 10, 2026
	Alexandre Boulerice	Rosemont—La Petite-Patrie	Environment and Climate Change	May 28, 2025	April 27, 2026
	Alexandre Boulerice	Rosemont—La Petite-Patrie	Labour	May 28, 2025	April 27, 2026
	Alexandre Boulerice	Rosemont—La Petite-Patrie	Transportation	May 28, 2025	April 27, 2026
	Alexandre Boulerice	Rosemont—La Petite-Patrie	Official Languages	May 28, 2025	April 27, 2026
	Alexandre Boulerice	Rosemont—La Petite-Patrie	Quebec and Ontario Economic Development	May 28, 2025	April 27, 2026
	Alexandre Boulerice	Rosemont—La Petite-Patrie	Quebec lieutenant of the New Democratic Party	May 28, 2025	April 27, 2026
	Leah Gazan	Winnipeg Centre	Women and Gender Equity	May 28, 2025	Current
	Leah Gazan	Winnipeg Centre	Children, Families and Social Development	May 28, 2025	Current
	Leah Gazan	Winnipeg Centre	People with Disabilities	May 28, 2025	Current
	Leah Gazan	Winnipeg Centre	Post-Secondary Education, Skills and Training	May 28, 2025	Current
	Leah Gazan	Winnipeg Centre	Prairies Economic Development	May 28, 2025	Current
	Lori Idlout	Nunavut	Arctic Sovereignty and Security	May 28, 2025	March 10, 2026
	Lori Idlout	Nunavut	Natural Resources	May 28, 2025	March 10, 2026
	Lori Idlout	Nunavut	Indigenous Affairs	May 28, 2025	March 10, 2026
	Lori Idlout	Nunavut	Justice	May 28, 2025	March 10, 2026
	Lori Idlout	Nunavut	Northern and Atlantic Economic Development	May 28, 2025	March 10, 2026
	Gord Johns	Courtenay—Alberni	Agriculture	May 28, 2025	Current
	Gord Johns	Courtenay—Alberni	Fisheries and Oceans	May 28, 2025	Current
	Gord Johns	Courtenay—Alberni	Health (including Mental Health and Addictions)	May 28, 2025	Current
	Gord Johns	Courtenay—Alberni	Rural, Small Business and Tourism	May 28, 2025	Current
	Gord Johns	Courtenay—Alberni	Veteran Affairs	May 28, 2025	Current
	Jenny Kwan	Vancouver East	Housing	May 28, 2025	Current
	Jenny Kwan	Vancouver East	Immigration and Citizenship	May 28, 2025	Current
	Jenny Kwan	Vancouver East	Infrastructure	May 28, 2025	Current
	Jenny Kwan	Vancouver East	Public Safety and National Security	May 28, 2025	Current
	Jenny Kwan	Vancouver East	Pacific Economic Development	May 28, 2025	Current
	Heather McPherson	Edmonton Strathcona	House leader of the New Democratic Party	April 10, 2026	Current
	Heather McPherson	Edmonton Strathcona	Defence	May 28, 2025	Current
	Heather McPherson	Edmonton Strathcona	Foreign Affairs and International Development	May 28, 2025	Current
	Heather McPherson	Edmonton Strathcona	Heritage (Arts, Culture and Sport)	May 28, 2025	Current
	Heather McPherson	Edmonton Strathcona	International Trade	May 28, 2025	Current
	Heather McPherson	Edmonton Strathcona	Seniors	May 28, 2025	Current
