= New Democratic Party Shadow Cabinet of the 44th Parliament of Canada =

NDP Shadow Cabinet of the 44th Canadian Parliament
- Fourth party of the House of Commons
- 2021–2025
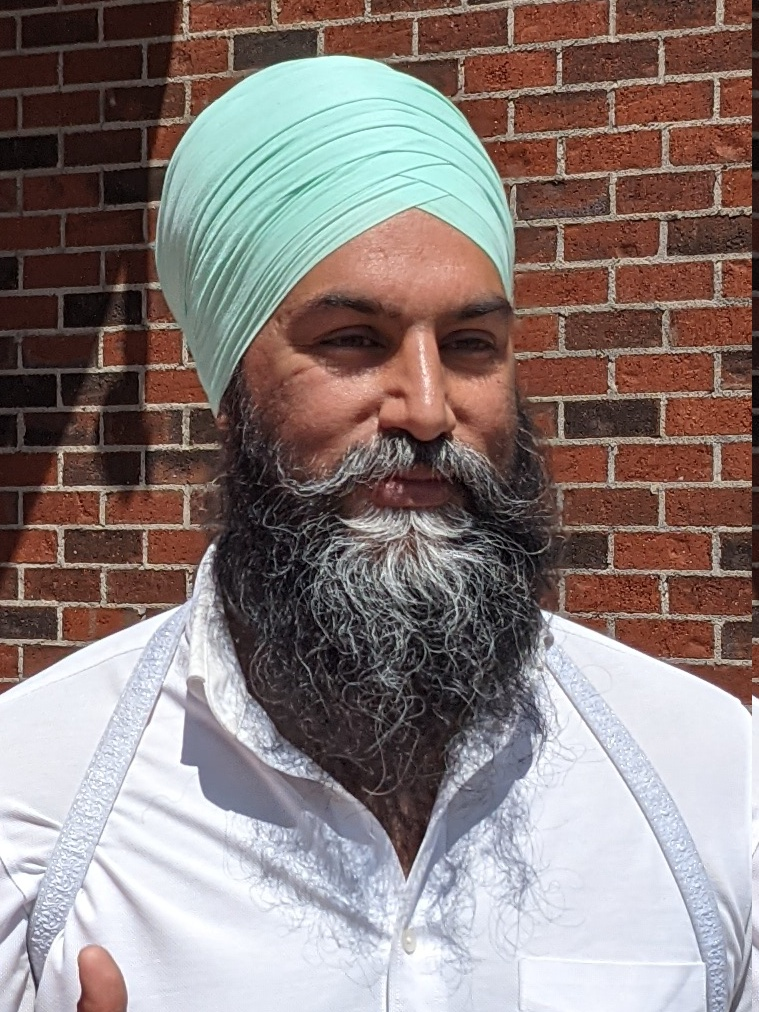
- NDP leader Jagmeet Singh
- Date formed: October 29, 2021
- Date dissolved: March 23, 2025

People and organizations
- Party Leader: Jagmeet Singh
- House Leader: Peter Julian
- Whip: Rachel Blaney
- Member party: New Democratic Party
- Status in legislature: Opposition (2021–2022, 2024–2025); Confidence and supply (2022–2024); 25 / 338 (7%)

History
- Election: 2021
- Outgoing election: 2025
- Legislature term: 44th Parliament of Canada
- Predecessor: 2019–2021 NDP Shadow Cabinet
- Successor: 2025–present NDP Shadow Cabinet

This is a list of members of the New Democratic Party Shadow Cabinet of the 44th Canadian Parliament. Positions in the shadow cabinet were announced on October 29, 2021, following the federal election on September 20 the same year. Appointed by party leader Jagmeet Singh, the shadow cabinet contains members of the NDP caucus in the Canadian House of Commons.

== Shadow Cabinet Members ==
Name	Image	Riding	Portfolio
Jagmeet Singh		Burnaby South	Leader; Intergovernmental Affairs
Charlie Angus		Timmins-James Bay	Natural Resources (Jobs and Just Transition); Crown–Indigenous Relations (Child Welfare) Deputy Critic; Ethics Deputy Critic
Niki Ashton		Churchill—Keewatinook Aski	National Revenue (Tax Fairness and Inequality); Official Languages; Indigenous Services Deputy Critic; Northern Affairs Deputy Critic
Taylor Bachrach		Skeena—Bulkley Valley	Transport; Infrastructure and Communities Deputy Critic
Lisa Marie Barron		Nanaimo—Ladysmith	Caucus Vice-chair Critic - Democratic Reform Fisheries, Oceans and the Canadian Coast Guard Mental Health and Substance Use Health Deputy Critic
Rachel Blaney		North Island—Powell River	Whip; Rural Economic Development; Seniors' Affairs; Veterans' Affairs
Alexandre Boulerice		Rosemont—La Petite-Patrie	Deputy Leader; Labour; Climate Change Deputy Critic; Official Languages Deputy Critic
Richard Cannings		South Okanagan—West Kootenay	Emergency Preparedness (Climate Change Resilience); Small Business and Tourism; International Trade; Innovation, Science and Industry Deputy Critic; Natural Resources Deputy Critic
Laurel Collins		Victoria	Environment and Climate Change; Families, Children and Social Development Deputy Critic
Don Davies		Vancouver Kingsway	Health; Foreign Affairs Deputy Critic; International Development Deputy Critic
Blake Desjarlais		Edmonton Griesbach	Caucus Vice-chair; Diversity and Inclusion; Post-secondary Education; Sport; Youth; 2SLGBTQI+ Rights Deputy Critic; Immigration, Refugees and Citizenship Deputy Critic
Randall Garrison		Esquimalt—Saanich—Sooke	Justice; 2SLGBTQI+ Rights; National Defence Deputy Critic
Leah Gazan		Winnipeg Centre	Women and Gender Equality; Families, Children, and Social Development; Housing Deputy Critic
Matthew Green		Hamilton Centre	Ethics; Treasury Board; Employment and Workforce Development Deputy Critic; Labour Deputy Critic; Public Services and Procurement Deputy Critic
Lori Idlout		Nunavut	Crown–Indigenous Relations; Indigenous Services; Northern Affairs
Gord Johns		Courtenay—Alberni	Mental Health and Harm Reduction; Public Services and Procurement
Peter Julian		New Westminster—Burnaby	House Leader; Canadian Heritage; Public Safety; Finance Deputy Critic
Jenny Kwan		Vancouver East	Caucus Chair; Housing; Immigration, Refugees and Citizenship
Alistair MacGregor		Cowichan—Malahat—Langford	Agriculture and Agri-Food; Food Price Inflation; Justice Deputy Critic
Heather McPherson		Edmonton Strathcona	Deputy Whip; Foreign Affairs; International Development; Canadian Heritage Deputy Critic
Brian Masse		Windsor West	Auto Strategy; Canada/US Border Relations; Great Lakes; Innovation, Science and Industry
Lindsay Mathyssen		London—Fanshawe	Deputy House Leader; National Defence; Women and Gender Equality Deputy Critic
Bonita Zarrillo		Port Moody—Coquitlam	Disability Inclusion; Infrastructure and Communities; Health Deputy Critic
