= Shadow Cabinet of Jagmeet Singh =

The Shadow Cabinet of Jagmeet Singh may refer to three New Democratic Party shadow cabinets led by Jagmeet Singh:

- New Democratic Party Shadow Cabinet of the 42nd Parliament of Canada (2015–2019, led by Singh starting in 2019)
- New Democratic Party Shadow Cabinet of the 43rd Parliament of Canada (2019–2021)
- New Democratic Party Shadow Cabinet of the 44th Parliament of Canada (2021–2025)
