= New Democratic Party Shadow Cabinet of the 43rd Parliament of Canada =

NDP Shadow Cabinet of the 43rd Canadian Parliament
- Fourth party of the House of Commons
- Date formed: November 28, 2019
- Date dissolved: September 20, 2021

People and organizations
- Party Leader: Jagmeet Singh
- House Leader: Peter Julian
- Whip: Rachel Blaney
- Member party: New Democratic Party
- Status in legislature: Opposition 24 / 338

History
- Election: 2019
- Legislature term: 43rd Parliament of Canada
- Predecessor: 2015–2019 NDP Shadow Cabinet
- Successor: 2021–2025 NDP Shadow Cabinet

This is a list of members of the New Democratic Party Shadow Cabinet of the 43rd Canadian Parliament. Positions in the shadow cabinet were announced on November 28, 2019, and included all 24 members of the New Democratic Party caucus in the Canadian House of Commons.

== Shadow Cabinet Members ==
=== November 28, 2019 - September 20, 2021 ===
Portfolio	Critic	Deputy
Caucus Officers
Leader	Jagmeet Singh	
House Leader	Peter Julian	Heather McPherson
NDP Whip	Rachel Blaney	Lindsay Mathyssen
Caucus Chair	Brian Masse	Laurel Collins
Asst. Deputy Speaker	Carol Hughes	
Parliamentary Critics
Atlantic Canada Opportunities Agency	Jack Harris	
Agriculture	Alistair MacGregor	
Canadian Heritage	Alexandre Boulerice	Peter Julian
Canadian Northern Economic Development Agency	Mumilaaq Qaqqaq	
Crown-Indigenous Relations and Indigenous Services	Jagmeet Singh	Gord Johns
Defence	Randall Garrison	Jack Harris
Democratic Reform	Daniel Blaikie	
Digital Government	Brian Masse	
Diversity and Inclusion and Youth	Lindsay Mathyssen	
Economic Development Agency of Canada for the Regions of Quebec	Alexandre Boulerice	
Ethics	Charlie Angus	Matthew Green
Environment and Climate Change	Laurel Collins	Alexandre Boulerice
Employment, Workforce Development and Disability Inclusion	Daniel Blaikie	
Export Promotion and International Trade	Daniel Blaikie	Lindsay Mathyssen
Families, Children, and Social Development	Leah Gazan	
Federal Economic Development Initiative for Northern Ontario	Charlie Angus	
Federal Economic Development Agency for Southern Ontario	Scott Duvall	
Finance	Peter Julian	Daniel Blaikie
Fisheries, Oceans and the Canadian Coast Guard	Gord Johns	
Foreign Affairs	Jack Harris	Heather McPherson
Health	Don Davies	Jenny Kwan
Housing	Jenny Kwan	
Income Inequality and Affordability	Charlie Angus	
Indigenous Youth	Charlie Angus	
Infrastructure & Communities	Taylor Bachrach	
Innovation, Science and Industry	Brian Masse	
Intergovernmental Affairs	Jagmeet Singh	
International Development	Heather McPherson	Lindsay Mathyssen
Immigration, Refugees and Citizenship	Jenny Kwan	Leah Gazan
Justice	Randall Garrison	Alistair MacGregor
Labour	Scott Duvall	Charlie Angus
National Revenue	Matthew Green	
Natural Resources	Richard Cannings	Mumilaaq Qaqqaq
Northern Affairs	Mumilaaq Qaqqaq	
Official Languages	Charlie Angus	
Pensions	Scott Duvall	
Public Ownership	Niki Ashton	
Public Safety and Emergency Preparedness	Jack Harris	Don Davies
Public Services and Procurement	Matthew Green	
Rural Economic Development	Alistair MacGregor	
Small Business	Gord Johns	Lindsay Mathyssen
Seniors	Scott Duvall	
Sexual Orientation and Gender Identity	Randall Garrison	
Telecommunications	Brian Masse	
Tourism	Gord Johns	
Transport	Niki Ashton	Richard Cannings
Treasury Board	Matthew Green	
Veterans	Rachel Blaney	Scott Duvall
Western Economic Diversification	Daniel Blaikie	
Women and Gender Equality	Lindsay Mathyssen	Niki Ashton
