= New Democratic Party Shadow Cabinet of the 42nd Parliament of Canada =

NDP Shadow Cabinet of the 42nd Canadian Parliament
- Third party of the House of Commons
- Date formed: November 12, 2015
- Date dissolved: September 11, 2019

People and organizations
- Party Leader: Thomas Mulcair (2015–2017); Jagmeet Singh (2017–2019)
- House Leader: Peter Julian (2015–2016); Murray Rankin (2016–2017); Peter Julian (2017–2018); Ruth Ellen Brosseau (2018–19)
- Whip: Marjolaine Boutin-Sweet
- Member party: New Democratic Party
- Status in legislature: Opposition 34 / 338

History
- Election: 2015
- Legislature term: 42nd Parliament of Canada
- Predecessor: 2011–2015 Official Opposition Shadow Cabinet
- Successor: 2019–2021 NDP Shadow Cabinet

This is a list of members of the New Democratic Party Shadow Cabinet of the 42nd Canadian Parliament. Positions in the shadow cabinet were announced on November 12, 2015, and included all 44 members of the New Democratic Party caucus in the Canadian House of Commons.

== Shadow Cabinet members ==
=== Singh II (January 31, 2018 – October 21, 2019) ===
Portfolio	Critic	Deputy
Caucus Officers
Leader	Jagmeet Singh	
House Leader	Ruth Ellen Brosseau	Murray Rankin
NDP Whip	Marjolaine Boutin-Sweet	Rachel Blaney
Caucus Chair	Daniel Blaikie	
Parliamentary Critics
Atlantic Canada Opportunities Agency		
Agriculture	Alistair MacGregor	Ruth Ellen Brosseau
BC Liaison	Nathan Cullen	
Canada Post	Irene Mathyssen	
Culture and Heritage	Pierre Nantel	
Democratic Reform		
Economic Development Agency of Canada for the Regions of Quebec	Christine Moore	
Electrification of transportation	Pierre Nantel	
Energy	Guy Caron	
Environment and Climate Change	Alexandre Boulerice	Linda Duncan
Ethics	Charlie Angus	Sheila Malcolmson
Families, Children, and Social Development	Brigitte Sansoucy	
Federal Economic Development Initiative for Northern Ontario	Charlie Angus	
Federal Economic Development Agency for Southern Ontario	Scott Duvall	
Finance	Peter Julian	Pierre-Luc Dusseault
Fisheries, Oceans & Coast Guard	Fin Donnelly	
Foreign Affairs	Hélène Laverdière	
La Francophonie	Robert Aubin	
Health	Don Davies	Georgina Jolibois
Housing	Sheri Benson	Marjolaine Boutin-Sweet
Indigenous Services	Georgina Jolibois	
Indigenous & Northern Affairs (Youth)	Charlie Angus	
Infrastructure & Communities	Brigitte Sansoucy	
Innovation, Science and Economic Development and Great Lakes	Brian Masse	
Intergovernmental Affairs	Guy Caron	
International Development	Linda Duncan	
International Human Rights	Cheryl Hardcastle	
Jobs, Employment, Precarious Work and Workforce Development	Niki Ashton	
Justice	Murray Rankin	
Labour	Karine Trudel	Tracey Ramsey
LGBTQ2+ Issues	Randall Garrison	Sheri Benson
Multiculturalism, Immigration, Refugees and Citizenship	Jenny Kwan	
National Defence	Randall Garrison	
National Parks	Wayne Stetski	
National Revenue	Pierre-Luc Dusseault	
Natural Resources	Richard Cannings	
Official Languages	François Choquette	
Pensions	Scott Duvall	
Post-secondary Education	Anne Minh-Thu Quach	
Public Services and Procurement	Erin Weir (suspended)	
Rural Affairs	Christine Moore	
Small Business & Tourism	Gord Johns	
Quebec lieutenant	Alexandre Boulerice	
Reconciliation (Indigenous Affairs), Canadian Northern Economic Development Agency	Romeo Saganash	Niki Ashton
Seniors	Rachel Blaney	
Sport and Persons with Disabilities	Cheryl Hardcastle	
Women's Equality		Anne Minh-Thu Quach
Trade	Tracey Ramsey	
Transport	Robert Aubin	
Treasury Board	Daniel Blaikie	
Veterans Affairs	Gord Johns	
Western Economic Diversification Canada	Daniel Blaikie	
Youth	Anne Minh-Thu Quach	

=== Singh I (October 2, 2017 – January 31, 2018) ===
Portfolio	Critic	Deputy
Caucus Officers
Leader	Jagmeet Singh	
Parliamentary leader	Guy Caron	David Christopherson
House Leader	Peter Julian	Matthew Dubé
NDP Whip	Marjolaine Boutin-Sweet	Irene Mathyssen
Caucus Chair	Daniel Blaikie	Charlie Angus
Parliamentary Critics
Atlantic Canada Opportunities Agency		
Agriculture	Ruth Ellen Brosseau	
Canada Post	Karine Trudel	
Canadian Heritage	Pierre Nantel	Alistair MacGregor
Democratic Reform	Nathan Cullen	Alexandre Boulerice
Economic Development Agency of Canada for the Regions of Quebec	Christine Moore	
Energy	Hon. Thomas Mulcair	
Environment and Climate Change	Linda Duncan	Robert Aubin
Ethics	Nathan Cullen	Karine Trudel
Families & Children	Brigitte Sansoucy	
Federal Economic Development Initiative for Northern Ontario		
Federal Economic Development Agency for Southern Ontario	Scott Duvall	
Finance	Alexandre Boulerice	Nathan Cullen
Fisheries & Oceans	Fin Donnelly	
Foreign Affairs	Hélène Laverdière	
Health	Don Davies	Brigitte Sansoucy
Immigration	Jenny Kwan	
Indigenous & Northern Affairs	Romeo Saganash	Georgina Jolibois
Indigenous & Northern Affairs (Youth)	Charlie Angus	
Infrastructure & Communities	Matthew Dubé	Rachel Blaney
Innovation, Science and Economic Development	Brian Masse	
Intergovernmental Aboriginal Affairs	Romeo Saganash	
Intergovernmental Affairs	Hon. Thomas Mulcair	
International Development and La Franchophonie	Robert Aubin	
International Trade	Tracey Ramsey	
Jobs, Employment & Workforce Development	Niki Ashton	
Justice	Murray Rankin	Alistair MacGregor
Labour	Sheri Benson	Karine Trudel
LGBT Issues	Randall Garrison	Sheri Benson
Multiculturalism	Jenny Kwan	
National Defence	Randall Garrison	
National Parks	Wayne Stetski	
National Revenue	Pierre-Luc Dusseault	
Natural Resources	Richard Cannings	
Pensions	Scott Duvall	
Post-secondary Education	Richard Cannings	
Public Safety and Emergency Preparedness	Matthew Dubé	
Public Services and Procurement	Erin Weir	
Rural Affairs	Christine Moore	
Science	Kennedy Stewart	
Small Business & Tourism	Gord Johns	
Sport and Persons with Disabilities	Cheryl Hardcastle	
Status of Women	Sheila Malcolmson	
Transport	Robert Aubin	
Treasury Board	Daniel Blaikie	
Veterans Affairs	Irene Mathyssen	
Western Economic Diversification Canada	Georgina Jolibois	
Youth	Anne Minh-Thu Quach	

=== Mulcair II (October 19, 2016 – October 1, 2017) ===
Portfolio	Critic	Deputy
Caucus Officers
NDP Leader	Hon. Thomas Mulcair	David Christopherson
NDP House Leader	Murray Rankin	Matthew Dubé
NDP Whip	Marjolaine Boutin-Sweet	Irene Mathyssen
Caucus Chair	Charlie Angus	Ruth Ellen Brosseau
Parliamentary Critics
Atlantic Canada Opportunities Agency	Guy Caron	None
Agriculture	Ruth Ellen Brosseau	None
Canadian Heritage	Pierre Nantel	Alistair MacGregor
Democratic Reform	Nathan Cullen	Alexandre Boulerice
Energy	Hon. Thomas Mulcair	None
Environment	Nathan Cullen	None
Ethics	Alexandre Boulerice	Daniel Blaikie
Families & Children	Brigitte Sansoucy	None
Federal Economic Development Initiative for Northern Ontario	Charlie Angus	None
Federal Economic Development Agency for Southern Ontario	Scott Duvall	None
Finance	Alexandre Boulerice	None
Fisheries & Oceans	Fin Donnelly	Guy Caron
Foreign Affairs	Hélène Laverdière	None
Health	Don Davies	Brigitte Sansoucy
Immigration	Jenny Kwan	None
Indigenous & Northern Affairs	Charlie Angus	Georgina Jolibois
Infrastructure & Communities	Matthew Dubé	Rachel Blaney
Innovation	Brian Masse	None
Intergovernmental Aboriginal Affairs	Romeo Saganash	None
Intergovernmental Affairs	Hon. Thomas Mulcair	None
International Development	Robert Aubin	None
International Trade	Tracey Ramsey	None
Jobs, Employment & Workforce Development	Niki Ashton	None
Justice	Murray Rankin	None
Labour	Sheri Benson	None
La Francophonie	Robert Aubin	None
LGBT Issues	Randall Garrison	None
Multiculturalism	Rachel Blaney	None
National Defence	Randall Garrison	None
National Revenue	Pierre-Luc Dusseault	None
Natural Resources	Richard Cannings	None
Persons with Disabilities	Cheryl Hardcastle	None
Post-secondary Education	Richard Cannings	None
Public Safety	David Christopherson	None
Public Services	Erin Weir	None
Rural Affairs	Christine Moore	None
Science	Kennedy Stewart	None
Small Business & Tourism	Gord Johns	None
Sport	Cheryl Hardcastle	None
Status of Women	Sheila Malcolmson	None
Transport	Linda Duncan	None
Treasury Board	Daniel Blaikie	None
Veterans Affairs	Irene Mathyssen	None
Youth	Anne Minh-Thu Quach	None

=== Mulcair I (October 19, 2015 – October 19, 2016) ===
Portfolio	Critic	Deputy
Caucus Officers
NDP Leader	Hon. Thomas Mulcair	David Christopherson
NDP House Leader	Peter Julian	Matthew Dubé
NDP Whip	Marjolaine Boutin-Sweet	Irene Mathyssen
Caucus Chair	Charlie Angus	Ruth Ellen Brosseau
Parliamentary Critics
Atlantic Canada Opportunities Agency	Guy Caron	None
Agriculture	Ruth Ellen Brosseau	None
Canadian Heritage	Pierre Nantel	Alistair MacGregor
Democratic Reform	Nathan Cullen	Alexandre Boulerice
Energy	Hon. Thomas Mulcair	None
Environment	Nathan Cullen	None
Ethics	Alexandre Boulerice	Daniel Blaikie
Families & Children	Brigitte Sansoucy	None
Finance	Guy Caron	None
Fisheries & Oceans	Fin Donnelly	Guy Caron
Foreign Affairs	Hélène Laverdière	None
Health	Don Davies	Brigitte Sansoucy
Immigration	Jenny Kwan	None
Indigenous & Northern Affairs	Charlie Angus	Georgina Jolibois
Infrastructure & Communities	Matthew Dubé	Rachel Blaney
Innovation	Brian Masse	None
Intergovernmental Aboriginal Affairs	Romeo Saganash	None
Intergovernmental Affairs	Hon. Thomas Mulcair	None
International Development	Robert Aubin	None
International Trade	Tracey Ramsey	None
Jobs, Employment & Workforce Development	Niki Ashton	None
Justice	Murray Rankin	None
Labour	Sheri Benson	None
La Francophonie	Robert Aubin	None
LGBT Issues	Randall Garrison	None
Multiculturalism	Rachel Blaney	None
National Defence	Randall Garrison	None
National Revenue	Pierre-Luc Dusseault	None
Natural Resources	Carol Hughes	Richard Cannings
Persons with Disabilities	Cheryl Hardcastle	None
Public Safety	David Christopherson	None
Public Services	Erin Weir	None
Rural Affairs	Christine Moore	None
Science	Kennedy Stewart	None
Small Business & Tourism	Gord Johns	None
Sport	Cheryl Hardcastle	None
Status of Women	Sheila Malcolmson	None
Transport	Linda Duncan	None
Treasury Board	Daniel Blaikie	None
Veterans Affairs	Irene Mathyssen	None
Youth	Anne Minh-Thu Quach	None

== By Role ==
Portfolio	Critic	Duration
Leader (Critic for the Prime Minister of Canada)	Hon. Thomas Mulcair	2015–2017
Intergovernmental Affairs	Hon. Thomas Mulcair	2015–2017
Energy	Hon. Thomas Mulcair	2015–2017
Agriculture and Agri-Food	Ruth Ellen Brosseau	2015–2019
Atlantic Canada Opportunities Agency	Guy Caron	2015–2019
Finance	Guy Caron	2015–2019
Deputy Fisheries, Oceans and the Canadian Coast Guard	Guy Caron	2015–2019
Canadian Heritage and Status of Women (Canadian Heritage)	Pierre Nantel	2015–2019
Status of Women	Sheila Malcolmson	2015–2019
Immigration, Refugees and Citizenship	Jenny Kwan	2015–2019
Economic Development Agency of Canada for the Regions of Quebec	Christine Moore	2015–
Rural Affairs	Christine Moore	2015–
Environment and Climate Change	Nathan Cullen	2015–
Democratic Reform	Nathan Cullen	2015–
Fisheries, Oceans and the Canadian Coast Guard	Fin Donnelly	2015–
Foreign Affairs	Hélène Laverdière	2015–
Health	Don Davies	2015–
Families, Children and Social Development	Brigitte Sansoucy	2015–
Deputy Health	Brigitte Sansoucy	2015–
Indigenous and Northern Affairs	Charlie Angus	2015–2016
Caucus Chair	Charlie Angus	2016
Innovation, Science and Economic Development	Brian Masse	2015–
International Development and La Francophonie	Robert Aubin	2015–
Minister of Infrastructure and Communities	Matthew Dubé	2015–
Deputy House Leader	Matthew Dubé	2015–
International Trade	Tracey Ramsey	2015–
Jobs, Employment and Workforce Development	Niki Ashton	2015
Justice and Attorney General	Murray Rankin	2015–
Labour	Sheri Benson	2015
House Leader	Peter Julian	2014–2016
House Leader	Murray Rankin	2016–2019
National Defence	Randall Garrison	2015–2019
LGBTQ Issues	Randall Garrison	2015–2019
National Revenue	Pierre-Luc Dusseault	2015–2019
Natural Resources	Carol Hughes	2015–2019
Federal Economic Development Initiative for Northern Ontario	Carol Hughes	2015–2019
Public Safety	David Christopherson	2015–
Chair – Planning and Priorities Committee	David Christopherson	2015–
Public Services and Procurement	Erin Weir	2015–
Science	Kennedy Stewart	2015–
Small Business and Tourism	Gord Johns	2015–
Sport and Persons with Disabilities	Cheryl Hardcastle	2015–
Transport	Linda Duncan	2015–
Treasury Board	Daniel Blaikie	2015–
Deputy Ethics	Daniel Blaikie	2015–
Veterans Affairs	Irene Mathyssen	2015–
Deputy Whip	Irene Mathyssen	2015–
Western Economic Diversification	Georgina Jolibois	2015–
Deputy Indigenous and Northern Affairs	Georgina Jolibois	2015–
Youth	Anne Minh-Thu Quach	2015–
Multiculturalism	Rachel Blaney	2015–
Deputy Infrastructure and Communities	Rachel Blaney	2015–
Quebec Lieutenant	Alexandre Boulerice	2015–
Ethics	Alexandre Boulerice	2015–
Deputy Democratic Reform	Alexandre Boulerice	2015–
Whip	Marjolaine Boutin-Sweet	2015–
Housing	Marjolaine Boutin-Sweet	2015–
Post-Secondary Education	Richard Cannings	2015–
Deputy Natural Resources	Richard Cannings	2015–
Official Languages	François Choquette	2015–
Pensions	Scott Duvall	2015–
Federal Economic Development Agency for Southern Ontario	Scott Duvall	2015–
Seniors	Alistair MacGregor	2015–
Deputy Canadian Heritage	Alistair MacGregor	2015–
Intergovernmental Aboriginal Affairs	Romeo Saganash	2015–2019
Canadian Northern Economic Development Agency	Romeo Saganash	2015–2019
National Parks	Wayne Stetski	2015–2019
Canada Post	Karine Trudel	2015–2019
Deputy Labour	Karine Trudel	2015–2019

The NDP does not have a leader in the Senate of Canada as the Party has no Senators. The NDP also opposes the existence of that body.

== See also ==
- Cabinet of Canada
- Official Opposition (Canada)
- Official Opposition Shadow Cabinet (Canada)
