= Heather McPherson (politician) =

Canadian politician (born 1972)

Heather McPherson MP
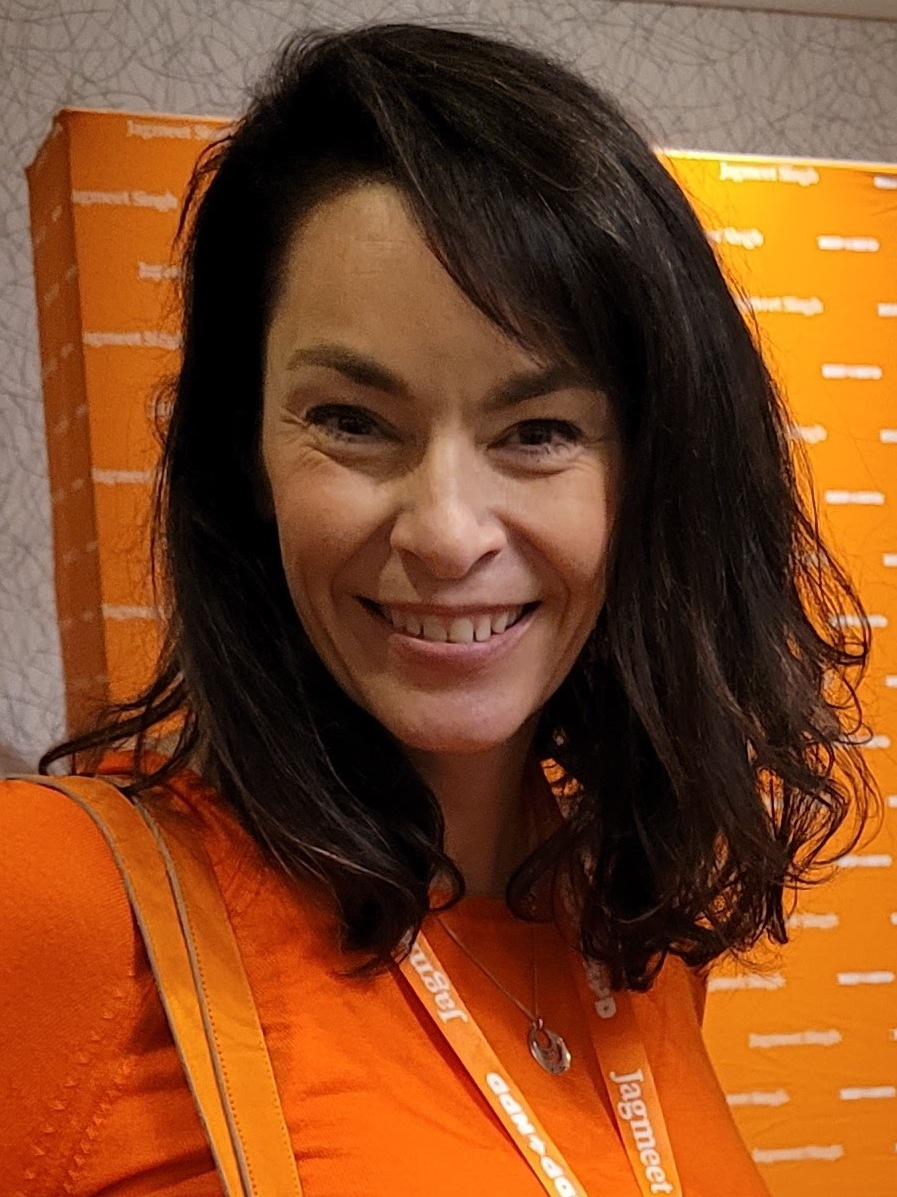
- McPherson in 2023

House Leader of the New Democratic Party
- Incumbent
- Assumed office April 10, 2026
- Leader: Avi Lewis
- Preceded by: Alexandre Boulerice

Whip of the New Democratic Party
- In office April 5, 2024 – April 28, 2025
- Leader: Jagmeet Singh
- Preceded by: Rachel Blaney
- Succeeded by: Don Davies (2026)

Member of Parliament for Edmonton Strathcona
- Incumbent
- Assumed office October 21, 2019
- Preceded by: Linda Duncan

Personal details
- Born: May 9, 1972 (age 54) Edmonton, Alberta, Canada
- Party: New Democratic
- Spouse: Duncan
- Children: 2
- Education: University of Alberta (M.Ed.)
- Website: www.heathermcpherson.ca

Heather McPherson (born May 9, 1972) is a Canadian politician who is the member of Parliament (MP) for Edmonton Strathcona. A member of the New Democratic Party (NDP), McPherson was first elected to the House of Commons in the 2019 general election. She ran to be the leader of the NDP in the 2026 leadership election, placing second.

== Early life ==
McPherson was born on May 9, 1972, in Edmonton, Alberta. She attended Old Scona Academic High School in the Old Strathcona district. McPherson graduated from the University of Alberta, where she earned both undergraduate and master's degrees in education. She previously served as executive director of the Alberta Council on Global Co-operation, specializing in international development.

== Political career ==
McPherson became the New Democratic Party's candidate for Edmonton Strathcona after incumbent Linda Duncan announced her intentions to retire. During the 2019 election, McPherson was endorsed by Green Party of Canada candidate Michael Kalmanovitch, in an attempt to prevent vote splitting. In the 43rd Canadian Parliament, which lasted from 2019 until the 2021 Canadian federal election was called, she was the only non-Conservative MP from Alberta. Alongside former Alberta premier Rachel Notley, McPherson supported the project to expand the Trans Mountain pipeline, despite the project being opposed by New Democratic Party leadership. McPherson has also advocated to limit coal mining in the Rocky Mountains and increase environmental oversight over mining.

She was re-elected in 2021, and was appointed the NDP critic for Foreign Affairs in the 44th Canadian Parliament. McPherson is known for pressing the Liberals to recognize Palestinian statehood, stating they lacked the "moral courage and political will" to advance a two-state solution between Palestine and Israel. McPherson was part of a group of Canadian Members of Parliament who travelled to the West Bank and Jordan as part of a fact-finding tour that involved meetings with Palestinian refugees, diplomatic officials, United Nations aid workers, and Israeli peace activists.

In 2022, McPherson, along with Jagmeet Singh, Charlie Angus and Anne McGrath formed a New Democratic Party delegation which visited Germany, meeting with Chancellor Olaf Scholz and other leading members of the Social Democratic Party of Germany.

In April 2022, McPherson proposed that the Canadian government recognize a genocide of Ukrainians by the Russian Armed Forces during the Russo-Ukrainian War. The proposal was passed unanimously in the House of Commons.

In May 2026, Politis reported that a confidential ethics complaint filed by lawyers for energy investor Igor Makarov alleged that McPherson had made defamatory parliamentary claims about Makarov’s sanctions status and the use of funds connected to him; the article noted that the complaint formed part of broader scrutiny of Canada’s sanctions regime following Russia’s invasion of Ukraine.

As foreign affairs critic, she has also supported international nuclear disarmament.

In the 2025 federal election, McPherson retained her seat in the Edmonton Strathcona riding. However, she was one of only a few NDP members to return to Parliament, as the party lost the majority of its seats in the House of Commons, along with official party status. This led to party leader Jagmeet Singh resigning from his role. Despite the defeat, McPherson said that she will now focus on the Liberals living up to "the promises they made to Canadians," ensuring her party "will do that."

=== 2026 leadership campaign ===
McPherson ran as a candidate in the 2026 New Democratic Party leadership election, launching her campaign on September 28, 2025, in Edmonton.

McPherson placed second in fundraising with over $700,000 and over 4,000 donors. During the campaign period, she was endorsed by former Alberta premier Rachel Notley and former Ontario MP Charlie Angus, among others. She came second in the first round behind Avi Lewis, receiving 20,899 votes (29.5%) to Lewis's 39,734 (56.0%).

==== Political positions ====
McPherson's policies included increasing housing affordability, "'head-to-toe' health care, calling for expansion of pharmacare, mental health care and dental care," and making the party more electorally viable by building a "bigger table"..

In her final address to NDP party members before the leadership ballot selection, McPherson stated that “across the country our values are winning” and called for unity with provincial wings of the NDP. Darren Major of CBC News wrote these remarks "appeared to be aimed at contrasting" her approach with that of her main contender, Lewis, whom critics said could create divisions with provincial party wings.

In her advocacy for opening up the political party and avoiding purity tests, she received criticism from fellow NDP MP Leah Gazan, who called "McPherson’s rhetoric a tacit “justification for white supremacy” that “centres the comfort” of “white, male, and able-bodied workers” over social justice." Gazan said “Rejecting so-called ‘purity tests’ isn’t about broadening the movement — it’s about narrowing it back to those who have always held power within it”.

== Personal life ==
McPherson is married to her husband, Duncan, and has 2 children. She is a cancer survivor.

== Electoral record ==
=== Leadership elections ===
2026 New Democratic Party leadership election
Candidate	First ballot	
Candidate	Votes	%
Avi Lewis	39,734	56.02%
Heather McPherson	20,899	29.46%
Tanille Johnston	5,159	7.27%
Rob Ashton	4,193	5.91%
Tony McQuail	945	1.33%
Total valid votes	70,930	99.99%
Rejected ballots	4	0.01%
Turnout	70,934	70.55%
Eligible voters	100,542	
Source: New Democratic Party

=== Federal elections ===
2025 Canadian federal election: Edmonton Strathcona
Party	Candidate	Votes	%	±%	Expenditures
New Democratic	Heather McPherson	28,027	46.96	–10.99	$113,792.42
Conservative	Miles Berry	19,768	33.12	+6.35	$47,957.55
Liberal	Ron Thiering	10,709	17.94	+8.92	$55,867.76
People's	David Joel Wojtowicz	386	0.65	–3.87	$1,213.42
Green	Atul Deshmukh	366	0.61	–0.64	none listed
Independent	Graham Lettner	250	0.42	–	$5,125.91
Communist	Christian Bourque	181	0.30	–	none listed
Total valid votes/expense limit		59,687	99.39	–	$128,865.02
Total rejected ballots		364	0.61	+0.01	
Turnout		60,051	72.00	+2.90	
Eligible voters		83,404			
New Democratic notional hold		Swing		–8.67	
Source: Elections Canada

2021 Canadian federal election: Edmonton Strathcona
Party	Candidate	Votes	%	±%	Expenditures
New Democratic	Heather McPherson	31,690	60.68	+13.41	$84,100.08
Conservative	Tunde Obasan	13,310	25.49	–11.58	$95,386.46
Liberal	Hibo Mohamed	3,948	7.56	–4.06	$22,672.65
People's	Wes Janke	2,366	4.53	+2.87	$4,252.77
Green	Kelly Green	634	1.21	–0.82	none listed
Libertarian	Malcolm Stinson	275	0.53	–	none listed
Total valid votes/expense limit		52,223	99.40	–	$108,879.96
Total rejected ballots		317	0.60	+0.16	
Turnout		52,540	69.10	–3.16	
Eligible voters		76,037			
New Democratic hold		Swing		+12.50	
Source: Elections Canada

2019 Canadian federal election: Edmonton Strathcona
Party	Candidate	Votes	%	±%	Expenditures
New Democratic	Heather McPherson	26,823	47.27	+3.31	$93,513.73
Conservative	Sam Lilly	21,035	37.07	+5.79	$88,211.43
Liberal	Eleanor Olszewski	6,592	11.62	–9.11	$90,837.85
Green	Michael Kalmanovitch	1,152	2.03	–0.27	$8,919.41
People's	Ian Cameron	941	1.66	–	$1,364.69
Communist	Naomi Rankin	125	0.22	–	$496.07
Marxist–Leninist	Dougal MacDonald	77	0.14	–0.03	none listed
Total valid votes/expense limit		56,745	99.56	–	$106,353.94
Total rejected ballots		250	0.44	+0.05	
Turnout		56,995	72.26	+1.27	
Eligible voters		78,876			
New Democratic hold		Swing		+4.55	
Source: Elections Canada
