= Rachel Blaney =

Canadian politician (born 1974)

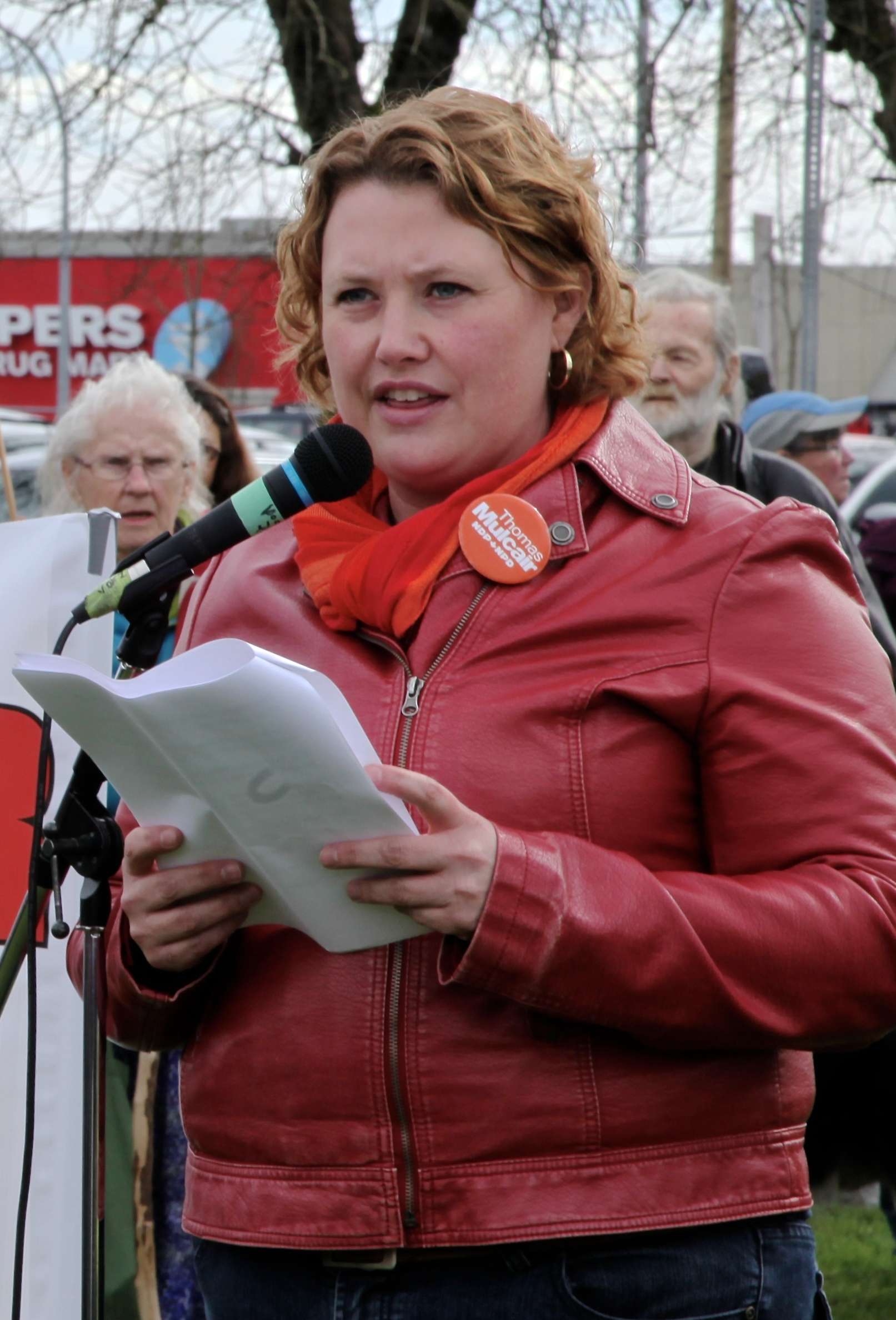
- Blaney in 2015

Whip of the New Democratic Party
- In office November 26, 2019 – March 23, 2025
- Leader: Jagmeet Singh
- Deputy: Lindsay Mathyssen; Heather McPherson
- Preceded by: Ruth Ellen Brosseau

Member of Parliament for North Island—Powell River
- In office October 19, 2015 – March 23, 2025
- Preceded by: John Duncan
- Succeeded by: Aaron Gunn

Personal details
- Born: September 18, 1974 (age 51)
- Party: New Democratic
- Occupation: Politician; executive director (non-profit)

Rachel A. Blaney (born September 18, 1974) is a Canadian politician who served as the member of Parliament (MP) for North Island—Powell River in the House of Commons from 2015 to 2025. A member of the New Democratic Party (NDP), she was first elected during the 2015 federal election. During the 43rd Parliament, she became her party's whip from 2019 to 2025.

== Background ==
Blaney was raised in Terrace, British Columbia, as an adoptive daughter of a Stellat'en First Nation family. She moved to Nanaimo to attend Malaspina University-College where she received a Bachelor of Arts degree in First Nation studies. She moved to Campbell River in 1998 where she married, and raised three children. She worked with the Homalco First Nation before becoming the executive director of the Immigrant Welcome Centre of North Vancouver Island (later the Multicultural and Immigrant Services Association of North Vancouver Island) in 2007.

== Political career (2015–2025) ==
In fall 2014, the 40-year-old Blaney sought to be the New Democratic Party candidate in the North Island—Powell River riding for the upcoming 2015 federal election, gaining the candidacy over challenger Dave Coles, a retired union leader also from Campbell River. She was encouraged by a visit from party leader Tom Mulcair in December 2014, and campaigned throughout 2015 in preparation for the October election in which she was viewed as a likely contender to wrest her riding away from the Conservative Party. In the election, she electorally benefited from a wave of NDP support over Vancouver Island and defeated Conservative Party political advisor Laura Smith, retired meteorologist Peter Schwarzhoff for the Liberal Party and financial administrator Brenda Sayers for the Green Party.

=== 42nd Canadian Parliament ===
Though Blaney was elected as a member of Parliament to represent the North Island—Powell River constituency, her party had lost seats overall and formed the third party in the 42nd Canadian Parliament. She opened constituency offices in Powell River and a shared Campbell River office with MLA Claire Trevena. For constituency work, Blaney hosted numerous public meetings on a variety of topics, including hosting Romeo Saganash to discuss aboriginal affairs and the NDP critic on international trade Tracey Ramsey to discuss the Trans-Pacific Partnership. Party leader Tom Mulcair assigned her to be the party's critic on multiculturalism issues and deputy critic (to Matthew Dubé) for the Ministry of Infrastructure and Communities. Mulcair reassigned her critic role from multiculturalism to seniors issues in February 2017. Also in 2017, Blaney was named as a defendant in a defamation lawsuit for a Facebook post that read, "Taxpayers paid $550,000 for what? No notes, nothing tracking the work he had done.". The lawsuit was filed by Gordon Wilson, whose politically appointed position as "LNG - Buy BC Advocate" was eliminated by a new provincial government and that Blaney ought to have known that the post was false. In the October 2017 NDP leadership election Blaney endorsed Jagmeet Singh, who went on to win and appoint Blaney as the party's Deputy Whip under Marjolaine Boutin-Sweet, and a year later, in 2019, added critic for veterans affair to her portfolio.

Blaney introduced two bills into parliament. First, An Act to amend the Canadian Bill of Rights (right to housing) (Bill C-325), sought to add the right to proper housing free of unreasonable barriers into the Canadian Bill of Rights. It was the same bill that Peter Stoffer had introduced in the previous four parliaments (38 through 41), but while it received first reading in December 2016, the bill was defeated at second reading in November 2017 with both the Liberal and Conservative parties voting against it. Blaney went on to introduced An Act to amend the Old Age Security Act (monthly guaranteed income supplement) (Bill C-449), in May 2019, which sought to allow guaranteed income supplement recipients additional time to file taxes and to mandate Employment and Social Development Canada to provide assistance in their tax filings. Along with Courtenay—Alberni MP Gord Johns, she advocated for reversing the previous government's scheduled closure of the Comox Marine Communications and Traffic Services. While the new government directed the Standing Committee on Fisheries and Oceans to review the closure, they ultimately upheld it.

=== 43rd Canadian Parliament ===
Blaney sought re-election in 2019 Canadian federal election but was again challenged by Schwarzhoff for the Liberal Party, as well as Port McNeill town councillor Shelley Downey for the Conservative Party. While Blaney won her North Island—Powell River riding, the 43rd Canadian Parliament convened in December 2019 with a Liberal Party minority government with her NDP being the fourth largest party. NDP leader Singh appointed Blaney to be party whip and kept her as critic for veterans affairs. During the 43rd Parliament Blaney introduced one private member's bill: Bill C-283 An Act to establish National Food Waste Awareness Day and to provide for the development of a national strategy to reduce food waste in Canada. It was the same bill as was introduced by Ruth Ellen Brosseau in the 42nd Parliament, though it never came up for second reading in either parliament. The bill proposed to require the Minister of Agriculture and Agri-Food to develop and implement a national strategy to reduce food waste and make October 16 "National Food Waste Awareness Day".

=== 44th Canadian Parliament ===
On April 4, 2024, she announced she would not run again for office in the 2025 Canadian federal election. She was succeeded by Conservative Aaron Gunn.

== Electoral record ==
2021 Canadian federal election: North Island—Powell River
Party	Candidate	Votes	%	±%	Expenditures
New Democratic	Rachel Blaney	23,833	39.5	+1.6	$62,260.34
Conservative	Shelley Downey	21,670	36.0	+3.4	$63,438.47
Liberal	Jennifer Grenz	7,922	13.1	±0.0	$44,209.34
Green	Jessica Wegg	3,656	6.1	-8.0	$22,023.44
People's	Paul Macknight	2,795	4.6	+2.8	$0.00
Maverick	Stacey Gastis	310	0.5	N/A	$26,200.41
Marxist–Leninist	Carla Neal	77	0.1	±0.0	$0.00
Total valid votes/expense limit		60,263	99.3	–	$147,765.33
Total rejected ballots		421	0.7		
Turnout		60,684	65.3		
Eligible voters		92,814			
New Democratic hold		Swing		-0.9	
Source: Elections Canada

2019 Canadian federal election: North Island—Powell River
Party	Candidate	Votes	%	±%	Expenditures
New Democratic	Rachel Blaney	23,834	37.9	-2.31	$59,655.63
Conservative	Shelley Downey	20,502	32.6	+6.43	$49,894.99
Green	Mark de Bruijn	8,891	14.1	+5.94	$34,354.18
Liberal	Peter Schwarzhoff	8,251	13.1	-12.37	none listed
People's	Brian Rundle	1,102	1.8	–	$5,894.54
Independent	Glen Staples	287	0.5	–	$3,027.54
Marxist–Leninist	Carla Neal	48	0.1	–	none listed
Total valid votes		62,915	100.00	–	
Total rejected ballots		291	–	–	
Turnout		63,206	–	–	
Eligible voters		89,561			
New Democratic hold		Swing		-4.37	
Source: Elections Canada

2015 Canadian federal election
Party	Candidate	Votes	%	±%	Expenditures
New Democratic	Rachel Blaney	24,340	40.21	-1.53	$139,441.92
Conservative	Laura Smith	15,840	26.17	-19.86	$83,346.00
Liberal	Peter Schwarzhoff	15,416	25.47	+19.11	$40,436.14
Green	Brenda Sayers	4,940	8.16	+3.01	$37,000.01
Total valid votes/Expense limit		60,536	100.00		$268,365.27
Total rejected ballots		177	0.29	–	
Turnout		60,713	75.21	–	
Eligible voters		80,730			
New Democratic notional gain from Conservative		Swing		+9.17	
Source: Elections Canada
