= Don Davies =

Canadian politician (born 1963)

Don Davies MP
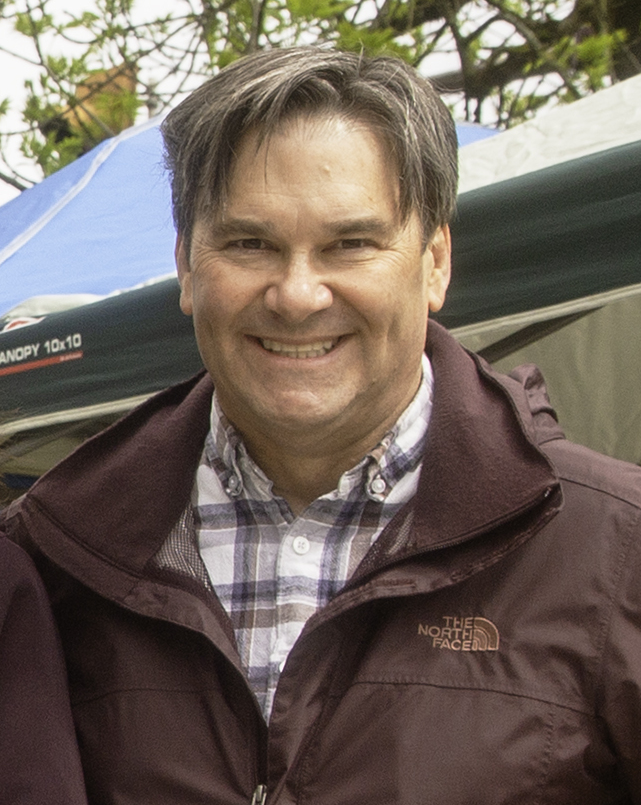
- Davies in 2022

Parliamentary Leader of the New Democratic Party
- Incumbent
- Assumed office April 10, 2026
- Leader: Avi Lewis
- Preceded by: Himself (as interim leader)

Interim leader of the New Democratic Party
- In office May 5, 2025 – March 29, 2026
- Deputy: Alexandre Boulerice
- Preceded by: Jagmeet Singh
- Succeeded by: Avi Lewis

Member of Parliament for Vancouver Kingsway
- Incumbent
- Assumed office October 14, 2008
- Preceded by: David Emerson

Opposition Critic for International Trade
- In office April 19, 2012 – October 19, 2015
- Leader: Nycole Turmel (interim; 2011–2012); Tom Mulcair (2012–2017)
- Shadowing: Ed Fast
- Preceded by: Brian Masse
- Succeeded by: Gerry Ritz

Opposition Critic for Citizenship and Immigration
- In office May 26, 2011 – April 18, 2012
- Leader: Tom Mulcair
- Shadowing: Jason Kenney
- Preceded by: Justin Trudeau
- Succeeded by: Jinny Sims

Personal details
- Born: Donald Vincent Davies; January 16, 1963 (age 63) Edmonton, Alberta, Canada
- Party: New Democratic
- Spouse: Sheryl Palm
- Children: 3
- Education: University of Alberta
- Profession: Lawyer

Donald Vincent Davies (born January 16, 1963) is a Canadian lawyer and politician who has been the member of Parliament (MP) for Vancouver Kingsway since 2008. A member of the New Democratic Party (NDP), Davies was selected to be interim party leader in 2025 and served until the election of Avi Lewis in the 2026 leadership election.

== Early life and career ==
Davies was born in Edmonton, Alberta. He earned a Bachelor of Arts in political science and a Bachelor of Laws at the University of Alberta. He later worked as a researcher at the Legislative Assembly of Alberta. From 1989 to 1991, he was executive assistant for policy and communications to Ray Martin, leader of the official opposition of Alberta.

Davies and his family moved to Vancouver in 1991. In 1992, he became the director of legal services for Teamsters Canada (Local 31), a position he held until his election to the House of Commons in 2008.

== Political career ==
Davies was first elected during the 2008 federal election. He received 15,933 votes in Vancouver Kingsway, winning the riding by almost 3,000 votes over his nearest competitor. Davies was re-elected in the 2011 election, receiving over 50 percent of the votes cast and winning by 10,300 votes over his nearest competitor. In 2015, he was re-elected for his third term, receiving 46 percent of the vote and leading his nearest competitor by over 8,000 votes. Davies was re-elected in the 2019 federal election, obtaining 49 percent of the vote and leading his nearest competitor by over 11,000 votes. This made him the longest-serving member of Parliament (MP) in the history of Vancouver Kingsway and the first MP ever to win the riding four times.

In the 40th Parliament, Davies served as NDP critic for Public Safety and National Security, vice-chair of the House of Commons Standing Committee on Public Safety and National Security and deputy critic for Western Diversification. In the 41st Parliament, Davies served as Official Opposition critic for Citizenship, Immigration and Multiculturalism, and vice-chair of the House of Commons Standing Committee on Citizenship, Immigration and Multiculturalism, and then as Official Opposition critic for International Trade, deputy critic for Citizenship, Immigration and Multiculturalism, and vice-chair of the House of Commons Standing Committee on International Trade. A member of a number of parliamentary groups, he serves on the executives of the Canada–China, Canada–Philippines, and Canada–Europe parliamentary associations, and is a Canadian parliamentary delegate to the Council of Europe.

In the 42nd Parliament, Davies introduced more private member's legislation than any other MP in Canada. This legislation included bills to establish universal pharmacare, a national school nutrition program, and free tuition for students with diverse needs. In the 43rd Parliament, Davies was re-appointed to the Health portfolio. He served on the Standing Committee on Health and was appointed to the National Security and Intelligence Committee of Parliamentarians. Davies maintained a stance against the extradition of Meng Wanzhou after her arrest in Vancouver in 2018, claiming political interference in the case by US president Donald Trump.

Davies considered running for mayor of Vancouver in the 2018 Vancouver municipal election but ultimately decided not to.

He was appointed the NDP critic for finance on April 5, 2024.

Davies was one of seven NDP MPs elected in the 2025 federal election, narrowly holding his seat by 310 votes. After leader Jagmeet Singh stepped down, the party's federal council chose Davies as interim leader of the New Democratic Party until the 2026 leadership election. MPs Leah Gazan, Lori Idlout, and Jenny Kwan wrote a letter to the party's executive and council saying they were not properly consulted in the selection of Davies as interim leader. They said that the party executive and other MPs did not hold caucus discussions or provide a timeline. In May 2025, NDP national director Lucy Watson said that the federal council had sole responsibility for choosing an interim leader under the constitution. In November 2025, five of seven NDP MPs—Davies, Alexandre Boulerice, Gazan, Kwan, and Heather McPherson—voted against passing the 2025 federal budget, while Idlout and Gord Johns abstained from the vote. In March 2026, NDP MP Lori Idlout crossed the floor to the Liberal Party, pushing the Carney government closer to a majority.

== Personal life ==
Davies also served on numerous public bodies to improve occupational health and safety and deliver more efficient regulatory systems in the transportation sector. He was the chair of the Mount Pleasant Parent Advisory Council and serves as secretary-treasurer of the Meridian Cultural Society, providing public space for childcare, church and cultural events.

Davies has been active in many community organizations, including Tools for Peace, Vancouver Co-op Radio, Lawyers for Social Responsibility, the La Quena Cooperative, and the Dickens Community Group. He has also been a local hockey coach and enjoys playing the violin.

A long-time resident of the Kensington neighbourhood in Vancouver Kingsway, Davies is married to Sheryl Palm, a speech language pathologist at Vancouver Children's Hospital. They have three children and a granddaughter.

== Electoral record ==
2025 Canadian federal election: Vancouver Kingsway
Party	Candidate	Votes	%	±%	Expenditures
New Democratic	Don Davies	18,788	37.24	–13.16	$116,136.09
Liberal	Amy K. Gill	18,485	36.64	+7.62	$96,281.50
Conservative	Ravinder Bhatia	12,352	24.49	+10.35	$44,122.30
Green	Imtiaz Popat	499	0.99	–2.64	none listed
People's	Fiona Wang	322	0.64	–1.56	none listed
Total valid votes/expense limit		50,446	99.35	–	$127,774.38
Total rejected ballots		332	0.65	–0.15	
Turnout		50,778	62.99	+9.06	
Eligible voters		80,608			
New Democratic notional hold		Swing		–10.38	
Source: Elections Canada

2021 Canadian federal election: Vancouver Kingsway
Party	Candidate	Votes	%	±%	Expenditures
New Democratic	Don Davies	20,994	52.28	+3.19	$99,674.26
Liberal	Virginia Bremner	11,022	27.45	+4.36	$47,586.74
Conservative	Carson Binda	5,456	13.59	–6.35	$7,752.14
Green	Farrukh A. Chishtie	1,575	3.92	–2.14	$2,013.80
People's	Jeremy MacKenzie	868	2.16	+1.19	$247.30
Communist	Kimball Cariou	175	0.44	–0.23	none listed
Marxist–Leninist	Donna Petersen	68	0.17	–0.04	none listed
Total valid votes/expense limit		40,158	99.20	–	$108,601.94
Total rejected ballots		324	0.80	–0.20	
Turnout		40,482	53.93	–4.73	
Eligible voters		75,060			
New Democratic hold		Swing		–0.59	
Source: Elections Canada

2019 Canadian federal election: Vancouver Kingsway
Party	Candidate	Votes	%	±%	Expenditures
New Democratic	Don Davies	21,680	49.09	+3.35	$100,998.49
Liberal	Tamara Taggart	10,194	23.08	–4.73	$99,083.54
Conservative	Helen Quan	8,804	19.94	–1.08	$39,178.78
Green	Lawrence Taylor	2,675	6.06	+2.81	$2,197.44
People's	Ian Torn	427	0.97	–	$3,869.88
Communist	Kimball Cariou	292	0.66	–0.32	$640.69
Marxist–Leninist	Donna Petersen	91	0.21	+0.03	none listed
Total valid votes/expense limit		44,163	99.00	–	$105,475.06
Total rejected ballots		446	1.00	–0.03	
Turnout		44,609	58.67	–4.65	
Eligible voters		76,039			
New Democratic hold		Swing		+4.04	
Source: Elections Canada

2015 Canadian federal election: Vancouver Kingsway
Party	Candidate	Votes	%	±%	Expenditures
New Democratic	Don Davies	20,763	45.74	–5.53	$113,476.84
Liberal	Steven Kou	12,625	27.81	+11.64	$82,210.90
Conservative	Jojo Quimpo	9,538	21.01	–7.09	$51,416.77
Green	Catherine Moore	1,476	3.25	–0.28	$1,663.13
Libertarian	Matt Kadioglu	468	1.03	+0.44	none listed
Communist	Kimball Cariou	445	0.98	+0.53	none listed
Marxist–Leninist	Donna Petersen	81	0.18	+0.01	none listed
Total valid votes/expense limit		45,396	98.97	–	$204,392.06
Total rejected ballots		471	1.03	+0.36	
Turnout		45,867	63.32	+6.26	
Eligible voters		72,438			
New Democratic hold		Swing		–8.58	
Source: Elections Canada

2011 Canadian federal election: Vancouver Kingsway
Party	Candidate	Votes	%	±%	Expenditures
New Democratic	Don Davies	23,457	50.08	+14.88%	–
Conservative	Trang Nguyen	13,157	28.09	+0.66%	–
Liberal	Wendy Yuan	7,796	16.64	−12.38%	–
Green	Louise Boutin	1,860	3.97	−2.73%	–
Libertarian	Matt Kadioglu	275	0.59	−11.0%	–
Communist	Kimball Cariou	220	0.47	−24.3%	–
Marxist–Leninist	Donna Peterson	78	0.17	−47.6%	–
Total valid votes/Expense limit		–	100.00%		

2008 Canadian federal election: Vancouver Kingsway
Party	Candidate	Votes	%	±%	Expenditures
New Democratic	Don Davies	15,933	35.20%	+1.7%	$81,501
Liberal	Wendy Yuan	13,164	29.02%	−14.4%	$79,758
Conservative	Salomon Rayek	12,419	27.43%	+8.64%	$70,829
Green	Doug Warkentin	3,031	6.7%	+3.87%	$3,478
Libertarian	Matt Kadioglu	309	0.68%	+0.09%	--
Communist	Kimball Cariou	291	0.64%	+0.29%	$391
Marxist–Leninist	Donna Peterson	149	0.33%	+0.19%	
Total valid votes/Expense limit		45,296	100.00%	$84,758	
Total rejected ballots		328			
Turnout		45,624			

Parliament of Canada
Preceded by David Emerson	Member of Parliament for Vancouver Kingsway; 2008–present	Incumbent
Party political offices
Preceded by Jagmeet Singh	Leader of the New Democratic Party; 2025–2026 interim	Succeeded by Avi Lewis
