= Leah Gazan =

Canadian politician (born 1972)

Leah Gazan MP
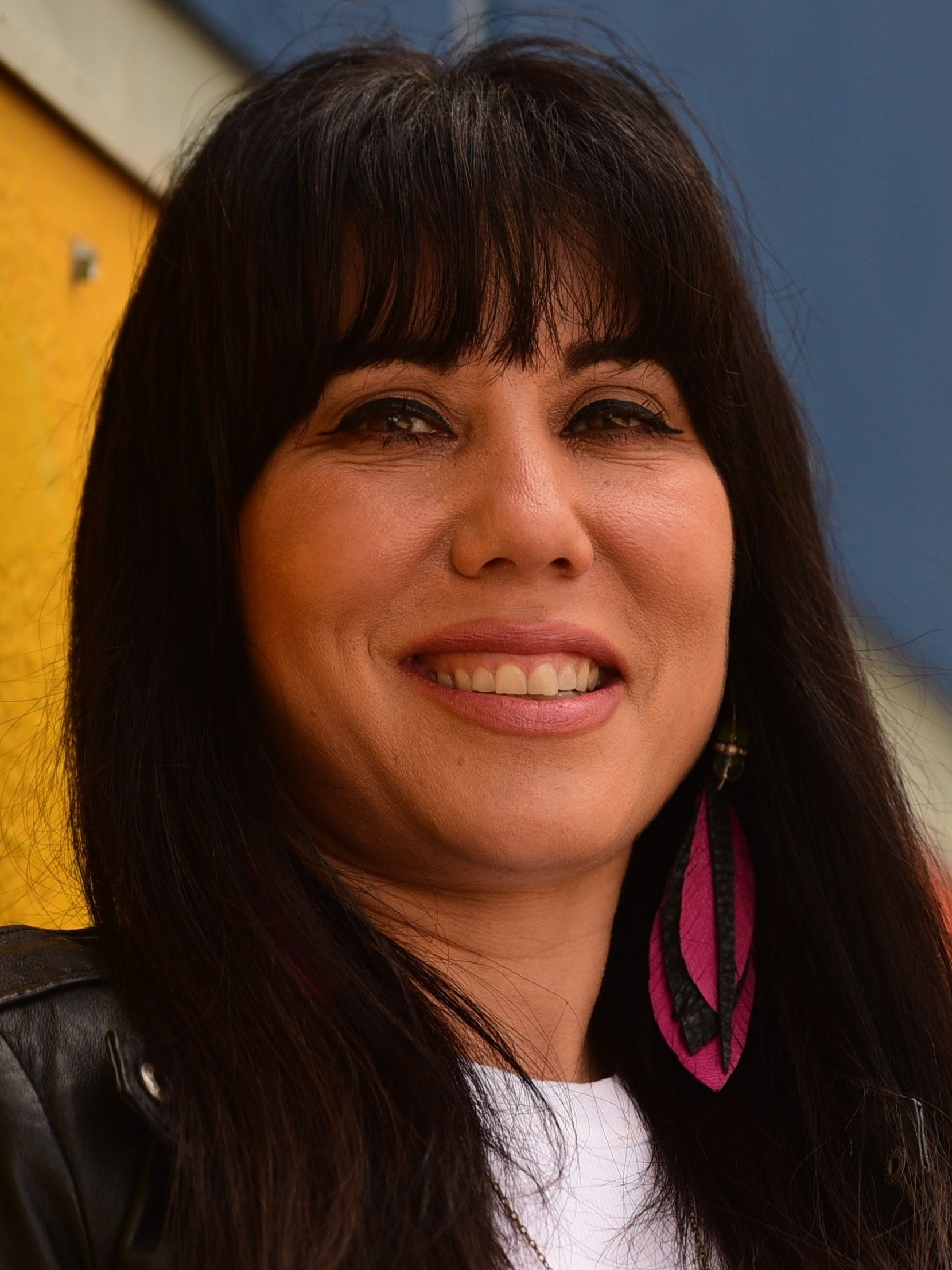
- Gazan in 2019

Member of Parliament for Winnipeg Centre
- Incumbent
- Assumed office October 21, 2019
- Preceded by: Robert-Falcon Ouellette

Personal details
- Born: April 8, 1972 (age 54) Thompson, Manitoba, Canada
- Party: New Democratic Party
- Education: University of Winnipeg (BEd); Central Michigan University (MA)

Leah Gazan MP (born April 8, 1972) is a Canadian politician. A member of the New Democratic Party (NDP), she was first elected to the House of Commons of Canada in the 2019 Canadian federal election, serving as the member of Parliament (MP) for Winnipeg Centre.

== Early life ==
Leah Gazan was born in Thompson, Manitoba to Abraham (Albert) Gazan and Marjorie Anne Lecaine. According to Gazan, both her parents are "survivors"; her maternal grandmother, Adeline LeCaine, is Lakota, and her maternal grandfather is Chinese, while her paternal grandparents are Jewish. Gazan's father, born at The Hague, South Holland in 1938, was two and a half years old when the Germans invaded Holland, and spent the remainder of the war in hiding, sheltered by Dutch families. Gazan's paternal grandmother, Gina Gazan, spent time in a concentration camp.

Both of Gazan's parents were organizers for the Co-operative Commonwealth Federation, the NDP's predecessor party.

Before her first political campaign, Gazan was a lecturer at the Faculty of Education in University of Winnipeg. She also served as president for the Social Planning council of Winnipeg. Gazan participated in Idle No More, and pushed for Bill C-262 to be passed by the House of Commons. She also represented the province of Manitoba for the United Nations Permanent Forum on Indigenous Issues advocating for acknowledgement of injustice perpetuated against Indigenous Canadian adoptive children.

== Political career ==
Gazan identifies as a socialist like her parents. In 2019, Gazan won the NDP nomination for Winnipeg Centre over former Manitoba Attorney General Andrew Swan. She subsequently defeated incumbent Liberal Robert-Falcon Ouellette at Winnipeg Centre, retaking the riding for the NDP.

During the 43rd Canadian Parliament, NDP leader Jagmeet Singh appointed Gazan to be the Critic for Families, Children, and Social Development in the NDP's Shadow Cabinet. She introduced one private member's bill, Bill C-323, An Act respecting a Climate Emergency Action Framework, which sought to require the Minister of the Environment to develop and implement a framework on achieving the objectives of the United Nations Framework Convention on Climate Change. At a vote on March 24, 2021, it was defeated, with Liberal and Conservative Party MPs voting against it.

In August 2020, Gazan introduced Motion 46 in the House of Commons of Canada, which would convert the Canada Emergency Response Benefit introduced by the federal government during the COVID-19 pandemic into a permanent basic income program. In 2021, she spoke in the House of Commons in support of a universal basic income.

In 2023, Gazan presented a motion to the House of Commons to declare the deaths and disappearances of Indigenous women and girls a Canada-wide emergency, which passed unanimously. The motion also called for the creation of a new system to send out alerts for missing Indigenous women.

In 2026, Gazan endorsed Avi Lewis in that year's federal NDP leadership race.

== Electoral record ==
2025 Canadian federal election: Winnipeg Centre
| Party | Candidate | Votes | % | ±% | Expenditures |
|---|---|---|---|---|---|
| New Democratic | Leah Gazan | 13,524 | 39.48 | –10.17 | |
| Liberal | Rahul Walia | 12,108 | 35.34 | +6.39 | |
| Conservative | Tom Bambrick | 7,658 | 22.35 | +9.55 | |
| Green | Gary Gervais | 389 | 1.14 | –1.25 | |
| People's | Donald Grant | 367 | 1.07 | –3.21 | |
| Animal Protection | Debra Wall | 213 | 0.62 | -0.05 | |
| Total valid votes/expense limit | | | | | |
| Total rejected ballots | | | | | |
| Turnout | | 34,259 | 53.55 | | |
| Eligible voters | | 63,978 | | | |
| New Democratic notional hold | | Swing | | –8.28 | |
Source: Elections Canada

2021 Canadian federal election: Winnipeg Centre
| Party | Candidate | Votes | % | ±% | Expenditures |
|---|---|---|---|---|---|
| New Democratic | Leah Gazan | 14,962 | 50.29 | +9.08 | $95,075.71 |
| Liberal | Paul Ong | 8,446 | 28.39 | -5.35 | $34,450.58 |
| Conservative | Sabrina Brenot | 3,818 | 12.83 | -4.70 | none listed |
| People's | Bhavni Bhakoo | 1,229 | 4.13 | +2.64 | $3,735.84 |
| Green | Andrew Brown | 708 | 2.38 | -2.86 | $0.00 |
| Libertarian | Jamie Buhler | 373 | 1.25 | N/A | none listed |
| Animal Protection | Debra Wall | 213 | 0.72 | N/A | $4,055.48 |
| Total valid votes/expense limit | | 29,749 | 98.8 | – | $101,566.38 |
| Total rejected ballots | | 365 | 1.2 | | |
| Turnout | | 30,114 | 52.2 | | |
| Eligible voters | | 57,672 | | | |
| New Democratic hold | | Swing | | +7.22 | |
Source: Elections Canada

2019 Canadian federal election: Winnipeg Centre
| Party | Candidate | Votes | % | ±% | Expenditures |
|---|---|---|---|---|---|
| New Democratic | Leah Gazan | 13,073 | 41.21 | +13.20 | $81,565.86 |
| Liberal | Robert-Falcon Ouellette | 10,704 | 33.74 | -20.77 | $93,870.93 |
| Conservative | Ryan Dyck | 5,561 | 17.53 | +5.17 | $16,427.27 |
| Green | Andrea Shalay | 1,661 | 5.24 | +1.17 | none listed |
| People's | Yogi Henderson | 474 | 1.49 | – | none listed |
| Christian Heritage | Stephanie Hein | 251 | 0.79 | +0.14 | none listed |
| Total valid votes/expense limit | | 31,724 | 100.0 | | |
| Total rejected ballots | | 274 | | | |
| Turnout | | 31,998 | 54.2 | | |
| Eligible voters | | 59,012 | | | |
| New Democratic gain from Liberal | | Swing | | +16.99 | |
Source: Elections Canada
