= Alexandre Boulerice =

Canadian politician (born 1973)

Alexandre Boulerice MNA
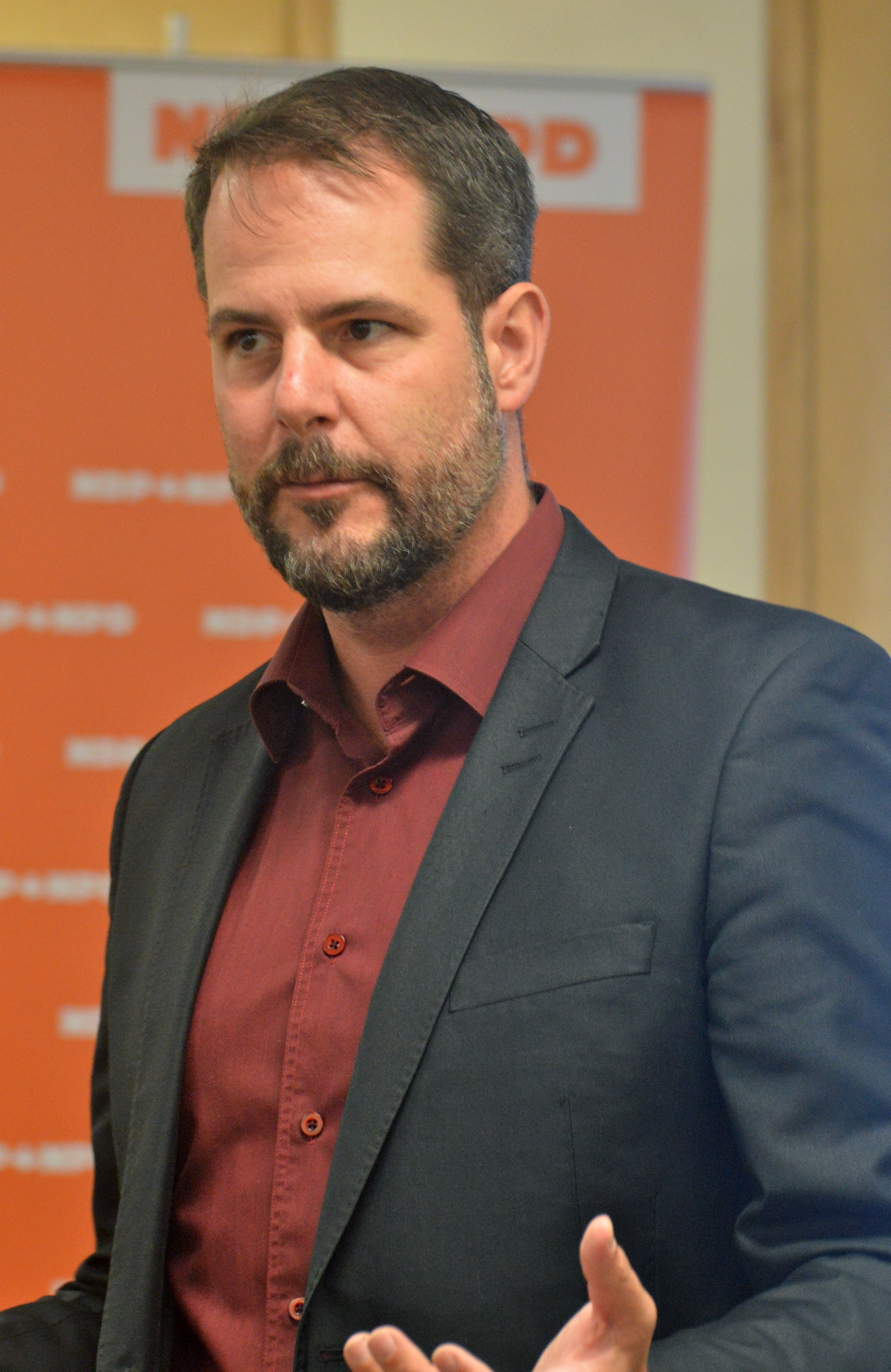
- Boulerice in September 2016

Member of the National Assembly for Gouin
- Incumbent
- Assumed office October 5, 2026
- Preceded by: Gabriel Nadeau-Dubois

Deputy Leader of the New Democratic Party
- In office March 11, 2019 – April 27, 2026 Serving with Sheri Benson (2019)
- Leader: Jagmeet Singh; Don Davies (interim); Avi Lewis
- Preceded by: David Christopherson
- Succeeded by: Vacant
Other leadership positions
House Leader of the New Democratic Party
In office May 28, 2025 – April 10, 2026
Leader	Don Davies (interim); Avi Lewis
Preceded by	Peter Julian
Succeeded by	Heather McPherson
Quebec lieutenant of the New Democratic Party
In office April 19, 2012 – April 27, 2026
Leader	Tom Mulcair; Jagmeet Singh; Don Davies (interim); Avi Lewis
Preceded by	Tom Mulcair
Official Opposition shadow portfolios
Shadow Minister for Labour
In office April 19, 2012 – November 19, 2015
Leader	Tom Mulcair
Preceded by	Yvon Godin
Succeeded by	Gerard Deltell
Shadow Minister for the Treasury Board
In office May 26, 2011 – April 18, 2012
Leader	Jack Layton; Nycole Turmel (interim)
Preceded by	Siobhan Coady
Succeeded by	Mathieu Ravignat

Member of Parliament for Rosemont—La Petite-Patrie
- In office May 2, 2011 – August 26, 2026
- Preceded by: Bernard Bigras

Personal details
- Born: June 18, 1973 (age 53) Saint-Jean-sur-Richelieu, Quebec, Canada
- Party: Québec solidaire (provincial)
- Other political affiliations: New Democratic (until 2026, federal); Union des forces progressistes (until 2006, provincial)
- Spouse: Lisa Djevahirdjian
- Children: 4
- Education: Université de Montréal; McGill University
- Profession: Communications adviser; community activist; journalist
- Website: www.boulerice.org

Alexandre Boulerice (French pronunciation: [alɛksɑ̃dʁ(ə) bulʁis]; born June 18, 1973) is a Canadian politician who has been the member of the National Assembly of Quebec (MNA) for Gouin since 2026. A member of Québec solidaire, Boulerice was elected to the National Assembly in the 2026 Quebec election. He was previously the member of Parliament (MP) for Rosemont—La Petite-Patrie from 2011 to 2026 as a member of the New Democratic Party (NDP), also serving as deputy NDP leader and Quebec lieutenant.

== Early life and career ==
Alexandre Boulerice was born June 18, 1973, in Saint-Jean-sur-Richelieu. He started working at age 15 as a lifeguard for the municipality and then went on to become pool manager. After his CEGEP years, he studied sociology at the Université de Montréal and completed graduate coursework in political science at McGill University, though he did not earn a master's degree.

Subsequently, he worked as a TV journalist (LCN, TVA), while being involved in the Canadian Union of Public Employees (CUPE) Local 687 where he was vice-president. He has also worked for a community group, l'Union des travailleurs et travailleuses accidentés de Montréal (UTTAM). He then became a communications consultant for CUPE.

== Federal politics ==
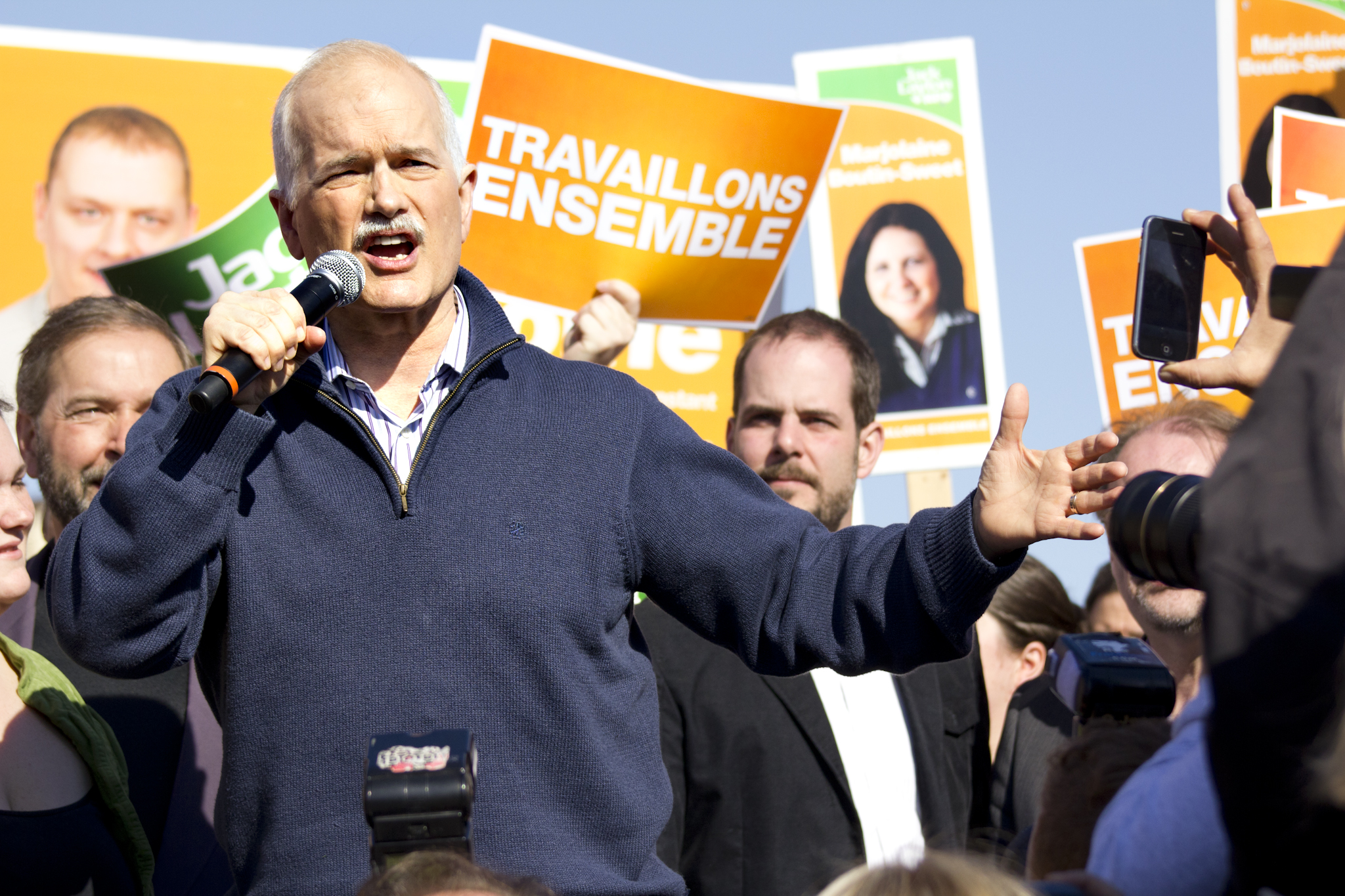
With Jack Layton during the 2011 federal campaign

Boulerice had been active in the federal New Democratic Party since the late 1990s. He first ran in the 2008 federal election and finished in third with 16.26 percent of the vote, well behind Bloc Québécois incumbent Bernard Bigras. He then became the vice president of communications for the Quebec section of the NDP, under the presidency of Françoise Boivin.

In the 2011 federal election, the NDP received 30.6 percent of the vote nationally, which translated into 103 seats in the House of Commons, of which more than half (fifty-nine) were from Quebec. This result allowed the NDP to form the Official Opposition in the House of Commons for the first time in Canadian history. This electoral breakthrough is now known as "la vague orange" (Orange Wave). One of those seats belonged to Boulerice, who won a decisive victory with 50.8 percent of the vote, finishing 9,700 votes ahead of Bigras. The NDP had never finished higher than third in the riding or its predecessors before.

On May 26, 2011, NDP leader Jack Layton appointed Boulerice to the Shadow Cabinet as opposition critic for the Treasury Board of Canada. In April 2012, new leader Tom Mulcair reassigned him to be Labour critic, and then as deputy Ethics and Access to Information critic.

In the 2012 leadership election, he supported Brian Topp.

After the 2015 election, in which the NDP fell back to third place in the federal seat count and the Liberal Party won a majority government, Mulcair appointed Boulerice to be the NDP's Quebec lieutenant, as well as its critic for Ethics and deputy critic for Democratic Reform in the 42nd Canadian Parliament. He also served as one of two New Democrats on the Special Committee on Electoral Reform.

Following the 2016 federal NDP convention's non-confidence vote in Tom Mulcair's leadership, various media outlets mentioned Boulerice as a potential candidate in the leadership election, including The Globe and Mail, The Canadian Press, and columnists such as Lysiane Gagon. CBC TV quoted him a few days after the convention as saying it was "too early" to decide whether to run. He eventually supported Peter Julian's candidacy and did not back any of the remaining candidates (Charlie Angus, Niki Ashton, Guy Caron, or eventual victor Jagmeet Singh) after Julian withdrew from the race.

In early 2017, Boulerice was named finance critic for the NDP. He was re-elected in the 2019, 2021, and 2025 federal elections. From 2019 until 2026, Boulerice was the only NDP MP from Quebec, and from 2025, was the only NDP MP from east of Winnipeg.

=== Bill C-307 ===
In fall 2011, Boulerice tabled Bill C-307, a private member's bill "For the reassignment of pregnant and lactating women", to protect the rights of pregnant and lactating women who must leave their jobs to protect their health or the health of their child. This bill was intended to allow all workers to receive a reassignment under the provisions in force in their respective provinces. Quebec workers covered by the Labour Code of Quebec can receive benefits from the Workplace Health and Safety (OSH) in the program, "For safe motherhood." This bill was intended to allow workers covered by the Labour Code of Canada receive the same benefits and not be penalized during their pregnancy.

This bill was rejected with 169 votes against and 108 votes in favour in May 2012.

=== Canada Post ===
In December 2013, Canada Post's board of directors announced that it would be gradually putting an end to door-to-door mail delivery, leading to the elimination of 6,000 to 8,000 jobs. Boulerice was one of the first to oppose the cuts by promptly launching a petition to inform citizens of the consequences of such a decision. Bolstered by broad public mobilization and mounting political reactions, he collaborated with the Canadian Union of Postal Workers to tour Quebec in order to explain the changes and to garner support against the decision. He ended his campaign by submitting a brief before the Commission sur le développement social et la diversité of the City of Montreal, which studied the impacts of ending door-to-door mail delivery on the installation of community mailboxes in densely populated areas, and on the quality of life of seniors and disabled people.

=== Vimy Ridge comments ===
On April 10, 2007, Boulerice wrote on a Quebec political blog, Presse-Toi A Gauche, praising those who objected to and actively resisted Canada's participation in the First World War, which he described as "a purely capitalist war on the backs of the workers and peasants". Boulerice further criticized the commemoration of the Battle of Vimy Ridge, led by the Conservative government under then Prime Minister Stephen Harper, saying that "thousands of poor wretches were slaughtered to take possession of a hill."

== Provincial politics ==
In the 2003 Quebec general election, Boulerice ran as a Union des forces progressistes candidate in Saint-Jean, receiving 1.48 percent of the vote.

On April 27, 2026, Boulerice confirmed that he would resign his House of Commons seat to run provincially for Québec solidaire. He remained in parliament as an independent MP until August 26.

He reportedly considered a run for the leadership of Projet Montréal ahead of the 2025 Montreal municipal election.

In February 2026, it was reported that he was seeking to be the Québec solidaire candidate in Gouin, which largely overlaps Boulerice's federal riding. However, the party's rules stipulate that the candidate in that constituency must be a woman or non-binary, automatically disqualifying Boulerice. Québec solidaire's executive proposed an amendment to create an exception to the rule for the constituency of Gouin. An exception to the party's rules, to allow Boulerice to run in Gouin, was approved on February 21, 2026, with 74 percent of delegates voting in favour. He was elected to the National Assembly of Quebec in the 2026 Quebec general election.

== Electoral record ==
=== Federal ===
2025 Canadian federal election: Rosemont—La Petite-Patrie
Party	Candidate	Votes	%	±%	Expenditures
New Democratic	Alexandre Boulerice	24,358	40.99	−7.58	$92,456.20
Liberal	Jean-Sébastien Vallée	18,757	31.57	+8.40	$24,721.13
Bloc Québécois	Olivier Gignac	10,864	18.28	−3.09	$22,137.00
Conservative	Laetitia Tchatat	4,073	6.85	+2.86	$2,806.26
Green	Benoît Morham	1,368	2.30	−0.08	$0.00
Total valid votes		59,420	98.75	+0.64	$129,252.39
Total rejected ballots		755	1.25	–0.64	
Turnout		60,175	72.30	+4.54	
Eligible voters		83,229			
New Democratic hold		Swing		−7.99	
Source: Elections Canada

2021 Canadian federal election: Rosemont—La Petite-Patrie
Party	Candidate	Votes	%	±%
New Democratic	Alexandre Boulerice	26,708	48.57	+6.09
Liberal	Nancy Drolet	12,738	23.17	-1.04
Bloc Québécois	Shophika Vaithyanathasarma	11,751	21.37	-2.39
Conservative	Surelys Perez Hernandez	2,199	4.00	+1.67
Green	Franco Fiori	1,308	2.38	-3.50
Marxist–Leninist	Gisèle Desrochers	284	0.52	+0.39
Total valid votes		54,988	98.11	
Total rejected ballots		1,062	1.89	
Turnout		56,050		
Eligible voters				
New Democratic hold		Swing		+3.57
Source: Elections Canada

2019 Canadian federal election: Rosemont—La Petite-Patrie
Party	Candidate	Votes	%	±%	Expenditures
New Democratic	Alexandre Boulerice	25,575	42.48	-6.69	$108,791.68
Liberal	Geneviève Hinse	14,576	24.21	+3.53	$67,673.40
Bloc Québécois	Claude André	14,306	23.76	+2.73	$16,536.02
Green	Jean Désy	3,539	5.88	+2.82	$4,206.72
Conservative	Johanna Sarfati	1,405	2.33	-1.96	$2,398.66
Rhinoceros	Jos Guitare Lavoie	346	0.57	-0.28	
People's	Bobby Pellerin	293	0.49		$1,385.02
Communist	Normand Raymond	86	0.14		
Marxist–Leninist	Gisèle Desrochers	80	0.13	-0.16	
Total valid votes/expense limit		60,206	100.0		
Total rejected ballots		718			
Turnout		60,924			
Eligible voters		85,290			
New Democratic hold		Swing		-5.11	
Source: Elections Canada

2015 Canadian federal election: Rosemont—La Petite-Patrie
Party	Candidate	Votes	%	±%	Expenditures
New Democratic	Alexandre Boulerice	28,692	49.17	-1.83	
Bloc Québécois	Claude André	12,276	21.03	-11.82	–
Liberal	Nadine Medawar	12,069	20.68	+11.53	–
Conservative	Jeremy Dohan	2,506	4.29	-0.03	–
Green	Sameer Muldeen	1,787	3.06	+1.39	–
Rhinoceros	Laurent Aglat	495	0.85	+0.08	–
Libertarian	Peter d'Entremont	353	0.60	–	–
Marxist–Leninist	Stéphane Chénier	171	0.29	+0.03	–
Total valid votes/Expense limit		–	100.0		$221,758.95
Total rejected ballots		–	–	–	
Turnout		58,349	69.13	+2.22	
Eligible voters		83,936			
New Democratic hold		Swing		+5.0	
Source: Elections Canada

2011 Canadian federal election: Rosemont—La Petite-Patrie
Party	Candidate	Votes	%	±%	Expenditures
New Democratic	Alexandre Boulerice	27,484	51.00	+34.74	
Bloc Québécois	Bernard Bigras	17,702	32.85	-19.15	
Liberal	Kettly Beauregard	4,920	9.13	-9.54	
Conservative	Sébastien Forté	2,328	4.32	-3.07	
Green	Sameer Muldeen	899	1.67	-2.92	
Rhinoceros	Jean-Patrick Berthiaume	417	0.77	+0.16	
Marxist–Leninist	Stéphane Chénier	140	0.26	-0.06	
Total valid votes/Expense limit		53,890	100.00		
Total rejected ballots		589	1.08		
Turnout		54,479	66.91		

2008 Canadian federal election: Rosemont—La Petite-Patrie
Party	Candidate	Votes	%	±%	Expenditures
Bloc Québécois	Bernard Bigras	27,260	52.00	-3.99	$52,571
Liberal	Marjorie Théodore	9,785	18.67	+2.91	$30,634
New Democratic	Alexandre Boulerice	8,522	16.26	+4.71	$21,117
Conservative	Sylvie Boulianne	3,876	7.39	-1.91	$85,619
Green	Vincent Larochelle	2,406	4.59	-2.01	$903
Rhinoceros	Jean-Patrick Berthiaume	319	0.61	–	$228
Marxist–Leninist	Stéphane Chérnier	170	0.32	–	
Independent	Michel Dugré	83	0.16	–	$690
Total valid votes/Expense limit		52,421	100.00	$86,436	
Total rejected ballots		614	1.16		
Turnout		53,035	64.65		

=== Provincial ===
2026 Quebec general election: Gouin
** Preliminary results — Not yet official **
Party	Candidate	Votes	%	±%
Québec solidaire	Alexandre Boulerice	19,431	62.61	+3.17
Parti Québécois	Isabelle Daoust	5,011	16.15	+2.52
Liberal	Hoang Annie Nguyen	3,976	12.81	+4.41
Conservative	Edouard Prud'homme	1,063	3.43	+0.32
Coalition Avenir Québec	Frank Tremblay	953	3.07	–9.30
Green	Camille Jannard	296	0.95	–1.12
Parti nul	Elizabeth Laferrière	201	0.65	±0.00
Climat Québec	Jean-Claude Saint-André	85	0.27	N/A
Équipe Autonomiste	Charles McNicoll	18	0.06	N/A
Total valid votes		31,034	98.96	–0.17
Total rejected ballots		326	1.04	+0.17
Turnout		31,360	72.62	+3.05
Electors on the lists		43,186		
Québec solidaire hold		Swing		+0.33
Source: Élections Québec

2003 Quebec general election: Saint-Jean
Party	Candidate	Votes	%	±%
Liberal	Jean-Pierre Paquin	14,758	40.75	
Parti Québécois	Roger Paquin	13,423	37.06	
Action démocratique	Marc-André Legault	6,856	18.92	
UFP	Alexandre Boulerice	535	1.48	
Bloc Pot	Eric Bédard	462	1.28	
Independent	Jean Robert	112	0.31	
Independent	Raymond Martin	73	0.20	
Total valid votes		36,219		
Total rejected ballots				
Turnout				
Electors on the lists				
Liberal gain from Parti Québécois		Swing		+
