= New Democratic Party =

Federal political party in Canada

New Democratic Party Nouveau Parti démocratique
- Abbreviation: NDP; NPD
- Leader: Avi Lewis
- President: Niall Ricardo
- National director: François Picard
- Parliamentary leader: Don Davies
- House leader: Heather McPherson
- Founded: August 3, 1961 (65 years ago)
- Merger of: Co-operative Commonwealth Federation; New Party; Canadian Labour Congress
- Headquarters: 279 Laurier Ave W Unit 300; Ottawa, Ontario, Canada; K1P 5J9
- Youth wing: Canada's Young New Democrats
- Membership (2026): ▲100,542
- Ideology: Social democracy; Democratic socialism
- Political position: Centre-left to left-wing
- International affiliation: Socialist International until 2013, then Progressive Alliance
- Union affiliate: Canadian Labour Congress
- Colours: Orange
- Slogan: In our lifetime (2026)
- Senate: 0 / 105
- House of Commons: 5 / 343

Website
- ndp.ca

The New Democratic Party (NDP; French: Nouveau Parti démocratique; NPD) is a federal political party in Canada. Widely described as social democratic and democratic socialist, the party sits at the centre-left to left-wing of the Canadian political spectrum, to the left of the Liberal Party. The party was founded in 1961 by the Co-operative Commonwealth Federation and the Canadian Labour Congress. As of 2026, it is the fourth-largest party in the House of Commons, with five seats.

The NDP is more integrated than other political parties in Canada, with some provincial- and territorial-level parties sharing membership with the federal party. The NDP has never won the largest share of seats at the federal level and thus has never formed a government. From 2011 to 2015, it formed the Official Opposition; apart from this, it has been the third or fourth-largest party in the House of Commons. However, the party has held the balance of power, and with it considerable influence, during periods of Liberal minority governments. Sub-national branches of the NDP have formed the government in six provinces (Ontario, Manitoba, Saskatchewan, Alberta, British Columbia, and Nova Scotia) and the territory of Yukon.

The NDP supports a mixed economy, broader welfare, Senate abolition, LGBTQ rights, international peace, environmental stewardship, and expanding Canada's universal healthcare system to include dental care, mental health care, eye and hearing care, infertility procedures, and prescription drugs.

== History ==
=== 20th century ===
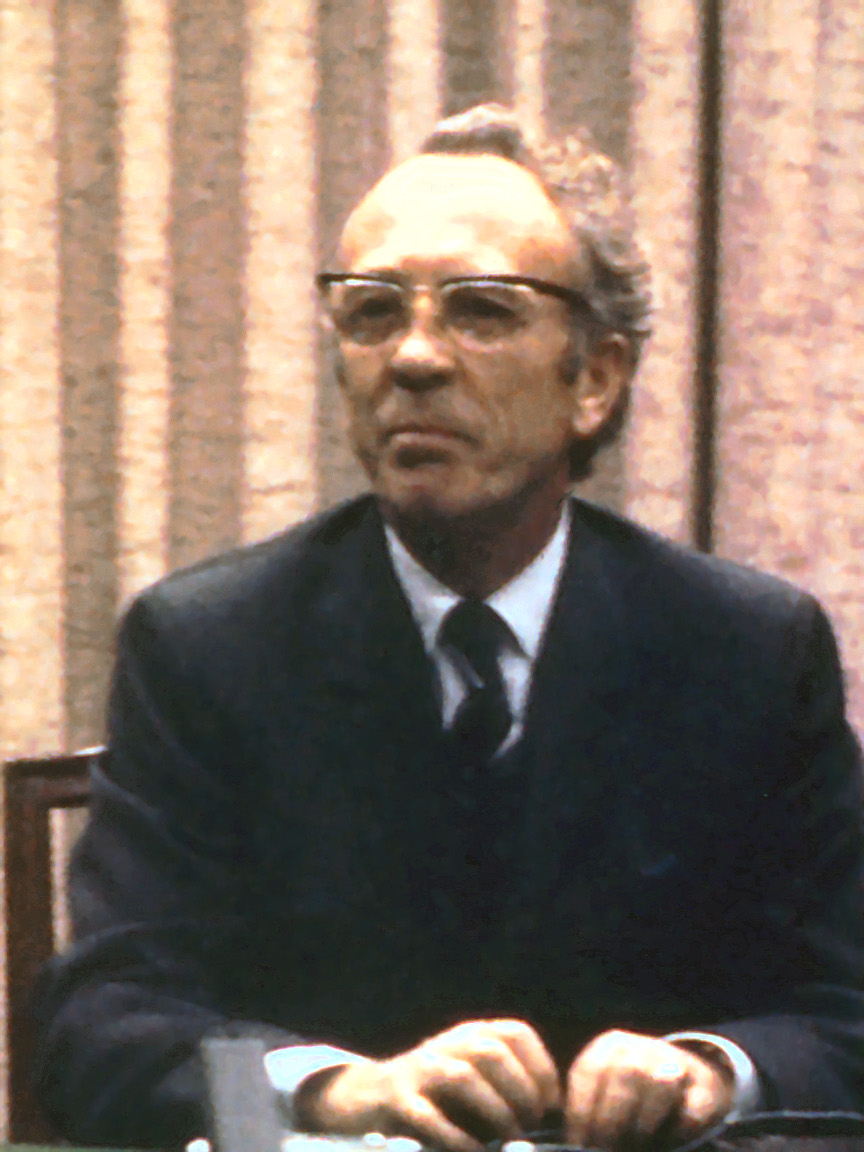
Tommy Douglas, leader of the NDP from 1961 to 1971

==== Origins and Tommy Douglas ====
In 1956, after the birth of the Canadian Labour Congress (CLC) by a merger of two previous labour congresses, negotiations began between the CLC and the Co-operative Commonwealth Federation (CCF) to bring about an alliance between organized labour and the political left in Canada. In 1958 a joint CCF-CLC committee, the National Committee for the New Party (NCNP), was formed to create a new social democratic political party, with ten members from each group. The NCNP spent the next three years laying down the foundations of the New Party, the party's interim name pending a national convention. During this process, a large number of New Party Clubs were established to allow like-minded Canadians to join in its founding, and six representatives from New Party Clubs were added to the National Committee. In 1961, at the end of a five-day long founding convention which established its principles, policies and structures, the New Democratic Party was born, and Tommy Douglas, the long-time CCF Premier of Saskatchewan, was elected as its first leader. Supporters of the New Democratic Party are sometimes referred to as "Dippers".

==== David Lewis ====
At the 1971 leadership convention, an activist group called the Waffle tried to take control of the party but was defeated by David Lewis with the help of the union members. The following year, most of The Waffle split from the NDP and formed their own party. The NDP itself supported the minority government formed by the Pierre Trudeau–led Liberals from 1972 to 1974, although the two parties never entered into a coalition. Together, they succeeded in passing several socially progressive initiatives into law such as pension indexing and the creation of the crown corporation Petro-Canada.

In 1974, the NDP worked with the Progressive Conservatives to pass a motion of non-confidence, forcing an election. However, it backfired as Trudeau's Liberals regained a majority government, mostly at the expense of the NDP, which lost half its seats. Lewis lost his own riding and resigned as leader the following year.

==== Ed Broadbent ====
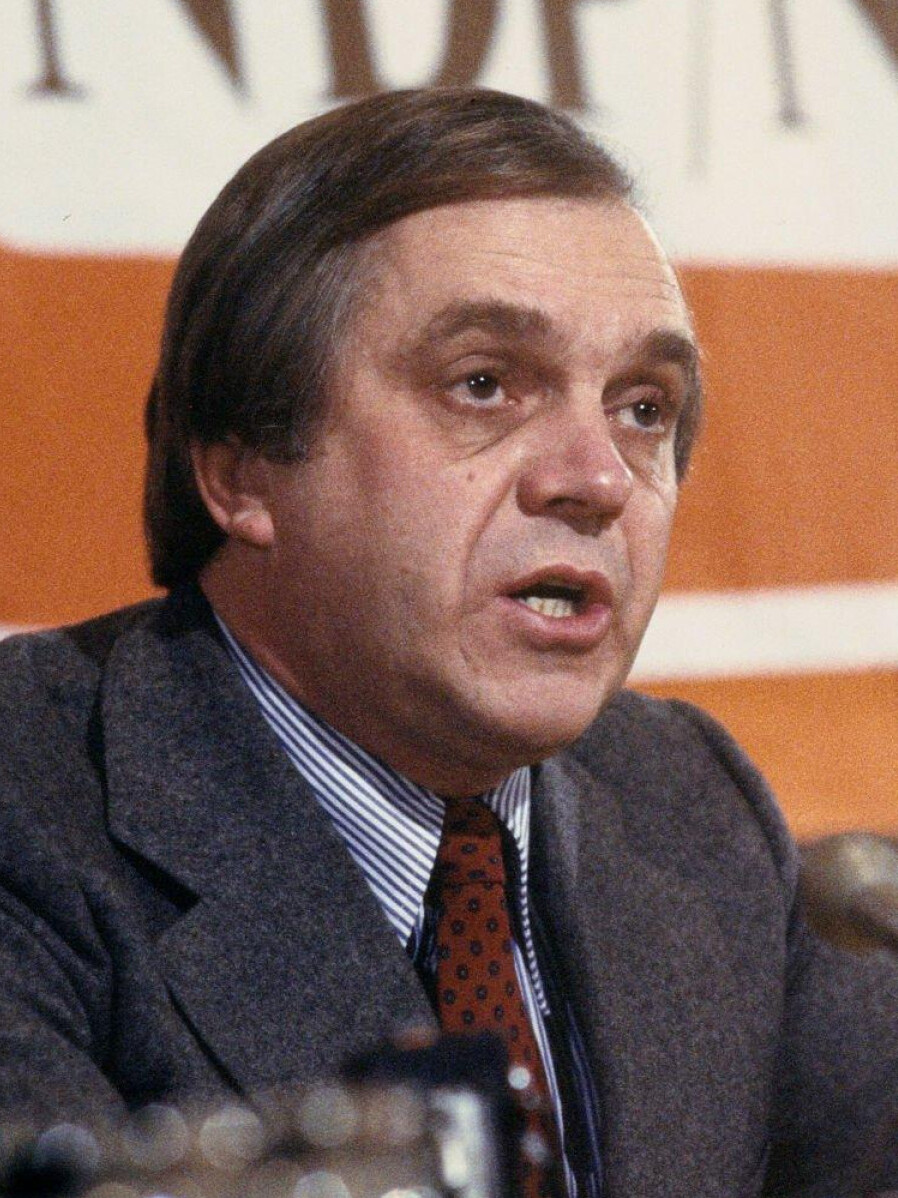
Ed Broadbent, leader of the NDP from 1975 to 1989

Under Ed Broadbent (1975–1989) the NDP attempted to find a more populist image to contrast with the governing parties, focusing on more pocketbook issues than on ideological fervour. The party played a critical role during Joe Clark's minority government of 1979–1980, moving the non-confidence motion on John Crosbie's 1979 budget that brought down the Progressive Conservative government and forced the 1980 election that brought the Liberal Party back to power.

In the 1984 election, which saw the Progressive Conservatives under Brian Mulroney win the most seats in Canadian history, the NDP won 30 seats, while the governing Liberals fell to 40 seats.

The NDP set a then-record of 43 members of parliament (MPs) elected to the house in the election of 1988. The Liberals, however, had reaped most of the benefits of opposing the Canada–United States Free Trade Agreement to emerge as the dominant alternative to the ruling PC government. In 1989, Broadbent stepped down after 14 years as federal leader of the NDP.

==== Audrey McLaughlin ====
At the party's leadership convention in 1989, former BC Premier Dave Barrett and Yukon MP Audrey McLaughlin were the main contenders for the leadership. During the campaign, Barrett argued that the party should be concerned with western alienation, rather than focusing its attention on Quebec. The Quebec wing of the NDP strongly opposed Barrett's candidacy, with Phil Edmonston, the party's main spokesman in Quebec, threatening to resign from the party if Barrett won. McLaughlin ran on a more traditional approach, and became the first woman to lead a major federal political party in Canada.

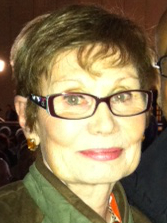
Audrey McLaughlin, leader of the NDP from 1989 to 1995

Although enjoying strong support among organized labour and rural voters in the Prairies, McLaughlin tried to expand their support into Quebec without much success. Under McLaughlin, the party did manage to win an election in Quebec for the first time when Edmonston won the 1990 Chambly by-election.

McLaughlin and the NDP were routed in the 1993 election, where the party won only nine seats and 7% of the vote, three seats short of official party status in the House of Commons. This was, until 2025, the NDP's lowest seat total in any election since the party's founding in 1961; the election also resulted in the lowest-ever total number of votes ever received by the NDP in a federal election. The loss was blamed on the unpopularity of NDP provincial governments under Bob Rae in Ontario and Mike Harcourt in British Columbia and the loss of a significant portion of the Western vote to the Reform Party, which promised a more decentralized and democratic federation along with right-wing economic reforms.

==== Alexa McDonough ====
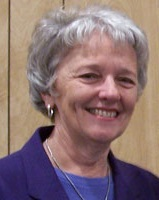
Alexa McDonough, leader of the NDP from 1995 to 2002

McLaughlin resigned in 1995 and was succeeded by Alexa McDonough, the former leader of the Nova Scotia NDP. In contrast to traditional Canadian practice, where an MP for a safe seat stands down to allow a newly elected leader a chance to enter Parliament via a by-election, McDonough opted to wait until the next election to enter Parliament.

The party recovered somewhat in the 1997 election, electing 21 members. The NDP made a breakthrough in Atlantic Canada, a region where they had been practically nonexistent at the federal level. Before 1997, they had won only three seats in Atlantic Canada. However, in 1997 they won eight seats in that region. The party was able to harness the discontent of voters in Atlantic Canada, who were upset over cuts to employment insurance and other social programs implemented by Jean Chrétien's Liberal majority government.

In the November 2000 election, the NDP campaigned primarily on the issue of Medicare but lost significant support. The governing Liberals ran an effective campaign on their economic record and managed to recapture some of the Atlantic ridings lost to the NDP in the 1997 election. The initial high electoral prospects of the Canadian Alliance under new leader Stockwell Day also hurt the NDP as many supporters strategically voted Liberal to keep the Alliance from winning. The NDP finished with 13 MPs—just barely over the threshold for official party status. McDonough announced her resignation as party leader for family reasons in June 2002 (effective upon her successor's election).

=== 21st century ===
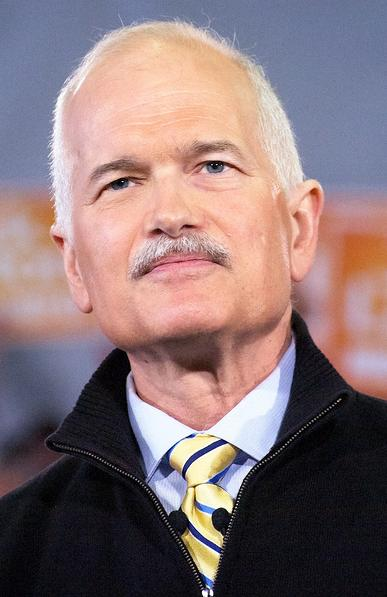
Jack Layton was the first leader of the NDP to become Leader of the Official Opposition.

==== Jack Layton ====
A Toronto city councillor and recent President of the Federation of Canadian Municipalities, Jack Layton was elected at the party's leadership election in Toronto on January 25, 2003.

The 2004 election produced mixed results for the NDP. It increased its total vote by more than a million votes; however, despite Layton's optimistic predictions of reaching 40 seats, the NDP only gained five seats in the election, for a total of 19. The party was disappointed to see its two Saskatchewan incumbents defeated in close races by the new Conservative Party (created by merger of the Canadian Alliance and Progressive Conservative parties), perhaps because of the unpopularity of the NDP provincial government.

The Liberals were re-elected, though this time as a minority government. Combined, the Liberals and NDP had 154 seats – one short of the total needed for the balance of power. As has been the case with Liberal minorities in the past, the NDP were in a position to make gains on the party's priorities, such as fighting health care privatization, fulfilling Canada's obligation to the Kyoto Protocol, and electoral reform. The party used Prime Minister Paul Martin's politically precarious position caused by the sponsorship scandal to force investment in multiple federal programs, agreeing not to help topple the government provided that some major concessions in the federal budget were ceded to.

On November 9, 2005, after the findings of the Gomery Inquiry were released, Layton notified the Liberal government that continued NDP support would require a ban on private healthcare. When the Liberals refused, Layton announced that he would introduce a motion on November 24 that would ask Martin to call a federal election in February to allow for several pieces of legislation to be passed. The Liberals turned down this offer. On November 28, 2005, Conservative leader Stephen Harper's motion of no confidence was seconded by Layton and it was passed by all three opposition parties, forcing an election.

During the election, the NDP won 29 seats, a significant increase of 10 seats from the 19 won in 2004. It was the fourth-best performance in party history, approaching the level of popular support enjoyed in the 1980s. The NDP kept all of the 18 seats it held at the dissolution of Parliament. While the party gained no seats in Atlantic Canada, Quebec, or the Prairie provinces, it gained five seats in British Columbia, five more in Ontario and the Western Arctic riding of the Northwest Territories.

The Conservatives won a minority government in the 2006 election, and initially the NDP was the only party that would not be able to pass legislation with the Conservatives. However, following a series of floor crossings, the NDP also came to hold the balance of power. The NDP voted against the government in all four confidence votes in the 39th parliament, the only party to do so. However, it worked with the Conservatives on other issues, including in passing the Federal Accountability Act and pushing for changes to the Clean Air Act.

Following that election, the NDP caucus rose to 30 members with the victory of NDP candidate Thomas Mulcair in a by-election in Outremont. This marked the second time ever (and first time in seventeen years) that the NDP won a riding in Quebec. The party won 37 seats in the 2008 federal election, the best performance since the 1988 total of 43. This included a breakthrough in the riding of Edmonton-Strathcona, only the second time the NDP had managed to win a federal seat in Alberta in the party's history.

In the 2011 federal election, the NDP won a record 103 seats, becoming the Official Opposition for the first time in the party's history. The party had a historic breakthrough in Quebec, where they won 59 out of 75 seats, dominating Montreal and sweeping Quebec City and the Outaouais. This meant that a majority of the party's MPs now came from a province where they had only ever had two candidates elected in the party's history. The NDP's success in Quebec was mirrored by the collapse of the Bloc Québécois, which lost all but four of its 47 seats, and the collapse of the Liberal Party nationally, which was cut down to just 34 seats, its worst-ever result. This also marked the first time in history where the Liberal Party was neither the government nor the Official Opposition, as the NDP had taken over the latter role. The NDP was now the second largest party in the House of Commons opposing a Conservative majority government.

In July 2011, Layton announced that he was suffering from a new cancer and would take a leave of absence, projected to last until the resumption of Parliament in September. He would retain his position of NDP Leader and Leader of the Opposition. The party confirmed his suggestion of Hull—Aylmer MP Nycole Turmel to carry out the functions of party leader in his absence. Layton died from his cancer on August 22, 2011.

==== Tom Mulcair ====
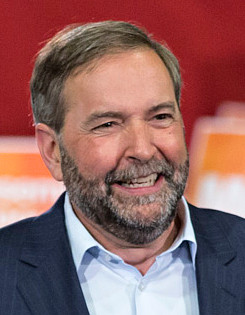
Tom Mulcair, leader of the NDP from 2012 to 2016

In his final letter, Layton called for a leadership election to be held in early 2012 to choose his successor, which was held on March 24, 2012, and elected new leader Tom Mulcair.

Despite early campaign polls which showed the NDP in first place, the party lost 59 seats in the 2015 election and fell back to third place in Parliament. By winning 44 seats, Mulcair was able to secure the second best showing in the party's history, winning one more seat than Ed Broadbent managed in the 1988 election, but with a smaller share of the popular vote. NDP seat gains in Saskatchewan and British Columbia were offset by numerical losses in almost every other region, while in Alberta and Manitoba the party maintained its existing seat counts. The party was locked out of Atlantic Canada and the Territories, and lost over half of its seats in Ontario, including all of its seats in Toronto. In Quebec, the NDP lost seats to all three of the other major parties, namely the Liberals, Conservatives, and Bloc Québécois, though it managed to place second in both vote share (25.4%) and seats (16) behind the Liberals in the province. The election resulted in a Liberal majority government.

Mulcair's leadership faced criticism following the election, culminating in his losing a leadership review vote held at the NDP's policy convention in Edmonton, Alberta on April 10, 2016. This marked the first time in Canadian federal politics that a leader was defeated in a confidence vote. Consequently, his successor was to be chosen at a leadership election to be held no later than October 2017, with Mulcair agreeing to remain as leader until then.

==== Jagmeet Singh ====
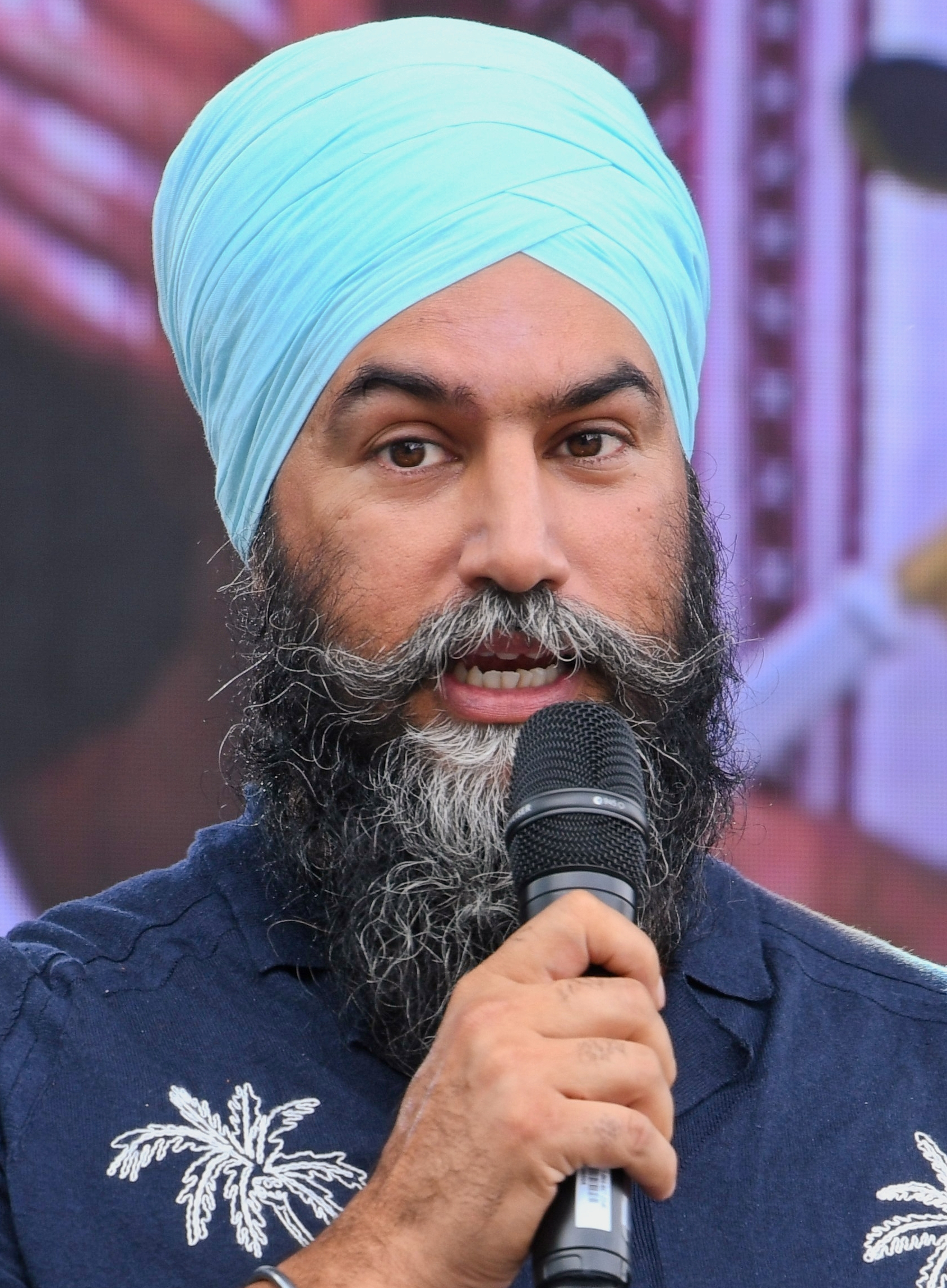
Jagmeet Singh, leader of the NDP from 2017 to 2025

On October 1, 2017, Jagmeet Singh, the first person of a visible minority group to lead a major Canadian federal political party on a permanent basis, won the leadership vote to head the NDP on the first ballot. On August 8, 2018, Singh announced he would be running in a by-election to replace Kennedy Stewart as the Member of Parliament for Burnaby South. Stewart had resigned in order to make an ultimately successful bid for Mayor of Vancouver. Singh relocated to Burnaby for the election and won on February 25, 2019, with 38.9 percent of the vote.

In the 2019 federal election, the NDP won only 24 seats in its worst result since 2004, shedding 15 seats. Alexandre Boulerice, who was elected to his third term in Rosemont—La Petite-Patrie, was the only NDP candidate to win a seat in Quebec, while the party lost all three of its Saskatchewan ridings (Desnethé—Missinippi—Churchill River, Regina—Lewvan, and Saskatoon West) to the Conservatives. The party remained shut out of Toronto and lost two of its MPs (Cheryl Hardcastle in Windsor—Tecumseh and Tracey Ramsey in Essex) in the rest of Ontario, while making small or no gains in the popular vote in Manitoba, Newfoundland and Labrador, Alberta and Nunavut. In British Columbia, the NDP lost three seats (Kootenay—Columbia, Port Moody—Coquitlam, and, after having lost it at a by-election, Nanaimo—Ladysmith); however, they retained most of their support in the province.

Following the election, the NDP held the balance of power as the Liberals won a minority government, although it fell back to fourth place behind the resurgent Bloc Québécois. During the COVID-19 pandemic, the NDP used its leverage to lobby the Liberals to be more generous in their financial aid to Canadians, including by extending of the Canada Emergency Response Benefit (CERB) program, which was a key demand in order to provide confidence to the government in the autumn of 2020.

In the snap 2021 federal election, the NDP made minor gains in both vote share and seat count, winning in 25 ridings. The party won a second seat in Alberta for the first time when Blake Desjarlais picked up Edmonton Griesbach and Heather McPherson won her second term at Edmonton Strathcona. The party also picked up two seats in British Columbia with Lisa Marie Barron reclaiming Nanaimo—Ladysmith and Bonita Zarrillo reclaiming Port Moody—Coquitlam. These gains were offset by losses to the Liberals in St. John's East and Hamilton Mountain, where incumbent NDP MPs Jack Harris and Scott Duvall did not stand for re-election. Overall, the election resulted in no change to the balance of power in the House of Commons.

In March 2022, the NDP agreed to a confidence and supply deal with the Liberal Party, led by Prime Minister Justin Trudeau. Among the policies included in the deal were the establishment of a national dental care program for low income Canadians, progress towards a national pharmacare program, labour reforms for federally regulated workers, and new taxes on financial institutions. In September 2024, the NDP ended their confidence and supply agreement with the Liberal Party; the deal had run from March 2022 but was pulled nine months early.

Following the appointment of Mark Carney as prime minister, the NDP suffered a steep decline in polling. At the 2025 federal election, the NDP has suffered its worst seat result in its history, losing 17 of their 24 seats to both Liberal and Conservative candidates, and lost official party status in the House of Commons. Singh failed to be elected in the new riding of Burnaby Central, and announced that he would resign as party leader after the selection of an interim leader. He was replaced by Vancouver Kingsway MP Don Davies on an interim basis until a new party leader is elected.

==== Avi Lewis ====
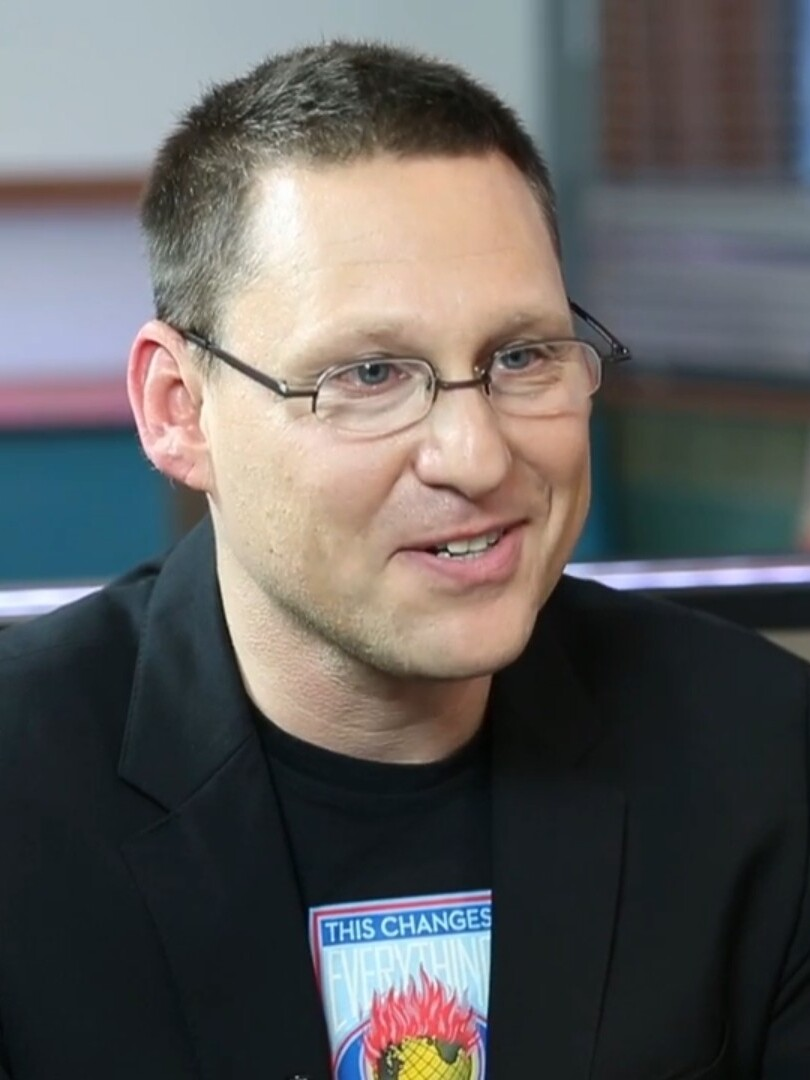
Avi Lewis, current leader of the NDP since 2026

On March 29, 2026, Avi Lewis, the grandson of former NDP leader David Lewis and son of former Ontario NDP leader Stephen Lewis, won the NDP leadership election on the first ballot. Afterwards, Alberta NDP leader Naheed Nenshi and Saskatchewan NDP leader Carla Beck criticized the federal party's oil and gas policy under Lewis.

== Ideology and policies ==
The NDP evolved in 1961 from a merger of the Canadian Labour Congress (CLC) and the Co-operative Commonwealth Federation (CCF). The CCF grew from populist, agrarian and socialist roots into a modern social democratic party; it has also been described as democratic socialist. Although the CCF was part of the Christian left and the Social Gospel movement, the NDP is secular and pluralistic. It has broadened to include concerns of the New Left, and advocates issues such as LGBT rights, international peace, and environmental stewardship. The NDP also supports a mixed economy and broader welfare, and has a left-wing, democratic socialist faction. The NDP is a member of the Progressive Alliance, a political international of progressive and social democratic parties.

=== Ideological orientation ===
The NDP's constitution states that both social democracy and democratic socialism are influences on the party. Specific inclusion of the party's history as the continuation of the more radical Co-operative Commonwealth Federation, and specific identification of the "democratic socialist" tradition as a continuing influence on the party are part of the language of the preamble to the party's constitution:

New Democrats are proud of our political and activist heritage, and our long record of visionary, practical, and successful governments. That heritage and that record have distinguished and inspired our party since the creation of the Co-operative Commonwealth Federation in 1933 and the founding of the New Democratic Party in 1961. New Democrats seek a future that brings together the best of the insights and objectives of Canadians who, within the social democratic and democratic socialist traditions, have worked through farmer, labour, co-operative, feminist, human rights and environmental movements, and with First Nations, Métis and Inuit peoples, to build a more just, equal, and sustainable Canada within a global community dedicated to the same goals.

=== Health care ===
The NDP states that it is committed to public health care. The party states that it fights for "a national, universal, public pharmacare program to make sure that all Canadians can access the prescription medicine they need with their health card, not their credit card – saving money and improving health outcomes for everyone". The party also states its support for expanding services covered under the national health care system to include dental care, mental health care, eye and hearing care, infertility procedures, and prescription drugs. Regarding dentistry, the NDP notes that "one in three Canadians has no dental insurance and over six million people don't visit the dentist every year because they can't afford to. Too many people are forced to go without the care they need until the pain is so severe that they are forced to seek relief in hospital emergency rooms".

=== Palestine ===
The NDP supports the Palestinian state. In March 2024, the House of Commons passed an NDP motion on Palestine after significant amendments were agreed with the Liberals. In particular, the motion called on the government to "officially recognize the State of Palestine"; however, this was amended to "work...towards the establishment of the State of Palestine as part of a negotiated two-state solution."

== Electoral achievements ==
Since its formation, the party has had a presence in the House of Commons. It was the third largest political party from 1965 to 1993, when the party dropped to fourth and lost official party status. The NDP's peak period of policy influence in those periods was during the minority Liberal governments of Lester B. Pearson (1963–1968) and Pierre Trudeau (1972–1974). The NDP regained official status in 1997, and played a similar role in the Liberal and Conservative minority governments of 2004–2006 and 2006–2011, respectively. Following the 2011 election, the party became the second-largest party and formed the Official Opposition in the 41st Canadian Parliament.

Provincial New Democratic parties, which are organizationally sections of the federal party, have governed in six of the ten provinces and one territory. As of 2025, the NDP governs the provinces of British Columbia and Manitoba, forms the Official Opposition in Alberta, Nova Scotia, Ontario, and Saskatchewan, and has sitting members in every provincial legislature except those of New Brunswick, Prince Edward Island, and Quebec. The NDP has previously formed the government in the provinces of BC, Alberta, Saskatchewan, Manitoba, Ontario, Nova Scotia, and the Yukon Territory. The NDP has since its founding in 1961 had at least one sitting member in every provincial legislature except that of Quebec.

While members of the party are active in municipal politics, the party does not organize at that level. For example, though former Toronto mayor David Miller was an NDP member during his successful 2003 and 2006 mayoral campaigns, his campaigns were not affiliated with the NDP. This is also the case with incumbent Toronto mayor Olivia Chow, Hamilton mayor Andrea Horwath, and former Vancouver mayor Kennedy Stewart.

=== Federal secretaries and national directors ===
Federal secretaries

- Ervin (Ernie) Hall (1961)
- Terry Grier (1962–1966)
- Clifford Scotton (1966–1974)
- Robin Sears (1974 – aft. 1980)
- Mary Ellen McQuay (c. 1981 – c. 1982)
- Gerry Caplan (1982–1984)
- Dennis Young (c. 1985)
- Bill Knight (1988–1989)
- Dick Proctor (1989–1992)
- Peter Julian (acting; c. 1990s)
- David Woodbury (c. 1997)
- Jill Marzetti (1997 – aft. 2000)
- Chris Watson (c. 2003)
- Eric Hébert-Daly (2004–2008)

National directors

- Dick Proctor (interim; c. 2008 – 2009)
- Brad Lavigne (2009–2011)
- Nathan Rotman (2012–2014)
- Anne McGrath (2014–2015)
- Karl Bélanger (interim; 2016)
- Robert Fox (2016–2018)
- Melissa Bruno (2018–2019)
- Anne McGrath (2019–2024)
- Lucy Watson (2024–2026)
- Matthew Green (interim; 2026)
- François Picard (2026–present)

== Provincial and territorial wings ==
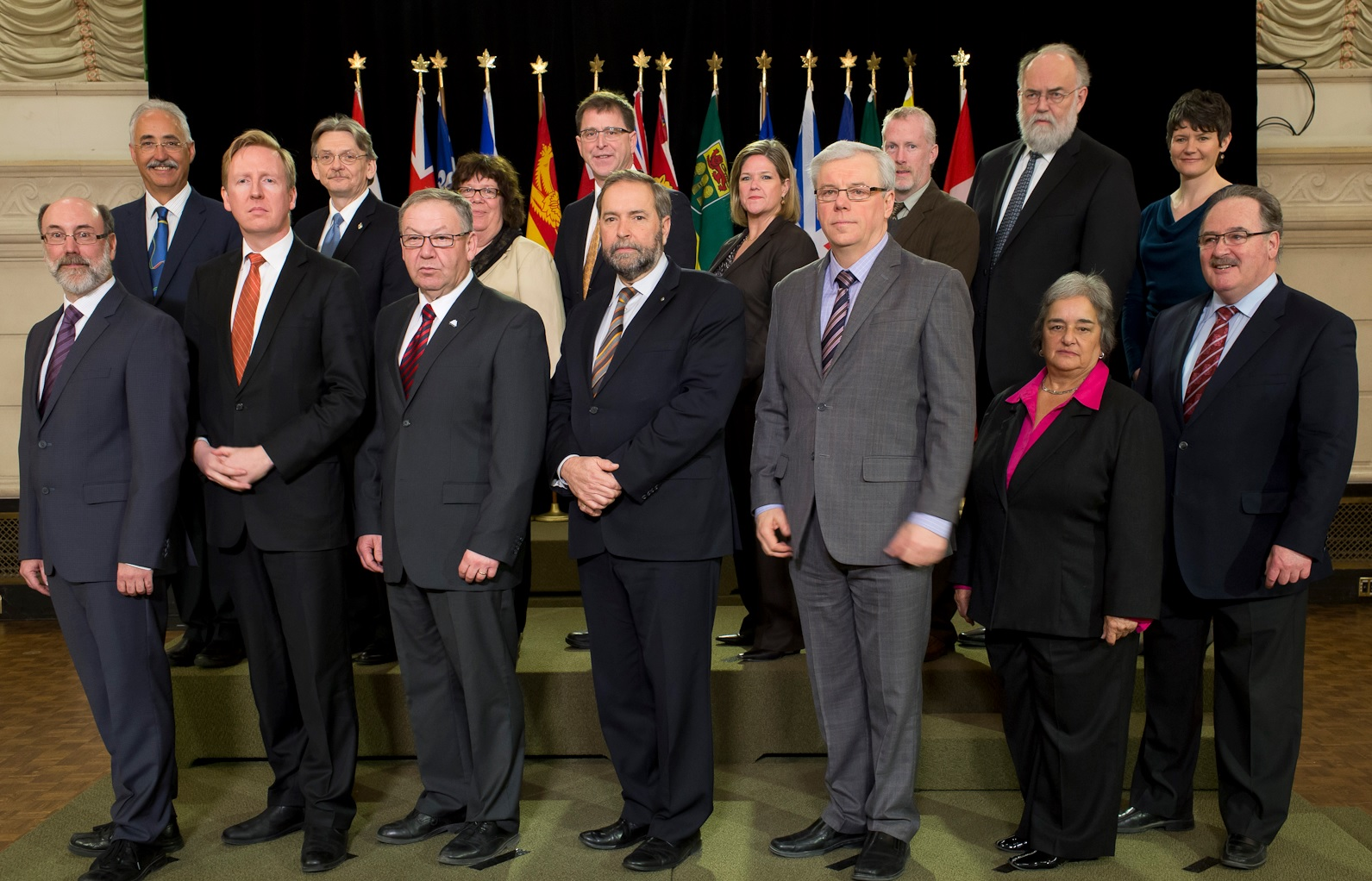
NDP leaders at the federal and provincial levels during a federal leaders summit on January 15, 2013

Unlike most other Canadian federal parties, the NDP is integrated with its provincial and territorial parties. Holding membership of a provincial or territorial section of the NDP includes automatic membership in the federal party, and this precludes a person from being a member of different parties at the federal and provincial levels. Membership lists are maintained by the provinces and territories. This has the effect of there being different minimum membership ages depending on the province, with age ranges from 12 to 14 years old. (Note: 12 in British Columbia and Yukon, 13 in Ontario and Saskatchewan, and 14 in the remaining provinces and territories.) The sole exception is the Alberta NDP, which voted to end its automatic joint membership in 2025, giving provincial members the option to opt out of federal membership.

There are two territories and one province without a local party: Nunavut, the Northwest Territories, and Quebec. In Nunavut and in the Northwest Territories, whose territorial legislatures have non-partisan consensus governments, the federal NDP is promoted by its riding associations, since each territory is composed of only one federal riding.

In Quebec, the historical New Democratic Party of Quebec was integrated with the federal party from 1963 until 1989, when the two agreed to sever their structural ties after the Quebec party adopted a sovereigntist platform. For the next two decades, the federal NDP was represented in Quebec only by their Quebec Section, whose activities in the province were limited to the federal level. In 2014, the New Democratic Party of Quebec (NDPQ) was re-established as a federalist party, unaffiliated with the federal NDP. The NDPQ dissolved at the end of 2024. The province's democratic socialist party, Québec solidaire, is not affiliated with the NDP and supports Quebec sovereignty.

The New Democratic Party currently forms government in Manitoba, and has previously formed government in Alberta, British Columbia, Nova Scotia, Ontario, Saskatchewan, and Yukon.

Current standing of affiliated of provincial and territorial parties
Party	Seats / Total	Role in legislature	Last election	Leader	Leader since
Alberta New Democratic Party	39 / 87	Opposition	2023	Naheed Nenshi (Note: Not a member of the federal NDP)	June 22, 2024
British Columbia New Democratic Party	28 / 93	Opposition	2026	Jennifer Whiteside (interim)	October 29, 2026
New Democratic Party of Manitoba	34 / 57	Majority	2023	Wab Kinew	September 16, 2017
New Brunswick New Democratic Party	0 / 49	Extra-parliamentary	2024	Alex White	June 28, 2022 (Note: Served as interim leader from June 28, 2022 – August 11, 2023.)
New Democratic Party of Newfoundland and Labrador	2 / 40	Third party	2025	Jim Dinn	October 19, 2021 (Note: On October 19, 2021, Alison Coffin resigned as leader of the NDP. The same day, Dinn would become interim leader. On March 28, 2023, Dinn was officially instated as the permanent leader of the NDP.)
Nova Scotia New Democratic Party	9 / 55	Opposition	2024	Claudia Chender	June 25, 2022
Ontario New Democratic Party	27 / 124	Opposition	2025	Marit Stiles	February 4, 2023
New Democratic Party of Prince Edward Island	0 / 27	Extra-parliamentary	2023	Thomas Burleigh	February 7, 2026
Saskatchewan New Democratic Party	26 / 61	Opposition	2024	Carla Beck	June 26, 2022
Yukon New Democratic Party	6 / 21	Opposition	2025	Kate White	May 4, 2019

== Current members of Parliament ==
No.	Name	Riding	Province/territory	MP since	Predecessor
1	Don Davies	Vancouver Kingsway	British Columbia	October 14, 2008	David Emerson
2	Leah Gazan	Winnipeg Centre	Manitoba	October 21, 2019	Robert-Falcon Ouellette
3	Gord Johns	Courtenay—Alberni	British Columbia	October 19, 2015	riding created
4	Jenny Kwan	Vancouver East	British Columbia	October 19, 2015	Libby Davies
5	Heather McPherson	Edmonton Strathcona	Alberta	October 21, 2019	Linda Duncan

== Federal leadership ==
- Tommy Douglas (1961–1971)
- David Lewis (1971–1975)
- Ed Broadbent (1975–1989)
- Audrey McLaughlin (1989–1995)
- Alexa McDonough (1995–2003)
- Jack Layton (2003–2011)
- Nycole Turmel (2011–2012; interim)
- Tom Mulcair (2012–2017)
- Jagmeet Singh (2017–2025)
- Don Davies (2025–2026; interim)
- Avi Lewis (since 2026)

== Election results ==
=== House of Commons ===
Election	Leader	Votes	%	Seats	+/−	Position	Status
1962	Tommy Douglas	1,044,754	13.57	19 / 265	▲11	▼4th	Fourth party
1963	Tommy Douglas	1,044,701	13.22	17 / 265	▼2	4th	Fourth party
1965	Tommy Douglas	1,381,658	17.91	21 / 265	▲4	▲3rd	Third party
1968	Tommy Douglas	1,378,263	16.96	22 / 264	▲1	3rd	Third party
1972	David Lewis	1,725,719	17.83	31 / 264	▲9	3rd	Third party
1974	David Lewis	1,467,748	15.44	16 / 264	▼15	3rd	Third party
1979	Ed Broadbent	2,048,988	17.88	26 / 282	▲10	3rd	Third party
1980	Ed Broadbent	2,165,087	19.77	32 / 282	▲6	3rd	Third party
1984	Ed Broadbent	2,359,915	18.81	30 / 282	▼2	3rd	Third party
1988	Ed Broadbent	2,685,263	20.38	43 / 295	▲13	3rd	Third party
1993	Audrey McLaughlin	939,575	6.88	9 / 295	▼34	▼4th	No status
1997	Alexa McDonough	1,434,509	11.05	21 / 301	▲12	4th	Fourth party
2000	Alexa McDonough	1,093,748	8.51	13 / 301	▼8	4th	Fourth party
2004	Jack Layton	2,127,403	15.68	19 / 308	▲6	4th	Fourth party
2006	Jack Layton	2,589,597	17.48	29 / 308	▲10	4th	Fourth party
2008	Jack Layton	2,515,288	18.18	37 / 308	▲8	4th	Fourth party
2011	Jack Layton	4,508,474	30.63	103 / 308	▲66	▲2nd	Official Opposition
2015	Tom Mulcair	3,441,409	19.71	44 / 338	▼59	▼3rd	Third party
2019	Jagmeet Singh	2,903,722	15.98	24 / 338	▼20	▼4th	Fourth party
2021	Jagmeet Singh	3,036,346	17.83	25 / 338	▲1	4th	Fourth party (2021–2022, 2024–2025)
2021	Jagmeet Singh	3,036,346	17.83	25 / 338	▲1	4th	Confidence and supply (2022–2024)
2025	Jagmeet Singh	1,236,317	6.29	7 / 343	▼18	4th	No status

== Logos ==
Logo history
1961 (Note: founding convention logo)	1961	1984	1997 (Note: Bilingual version of the logo)	2004	2012	2026

== See also ==
- List of federal political parties in Canada
- List of CCF/NDP MPs

Progressive think tanks:

- Broadbent Institute
- Douglas–Coldwell Foundation

Factions of the NDP:

- Left Caucus
- New Politics Initiative

International:

- Socialist International
