= Leader of the New Democratic Party =

Party leader of the federal New Democratic Party

- Chef du Nouveau Parti démocratique

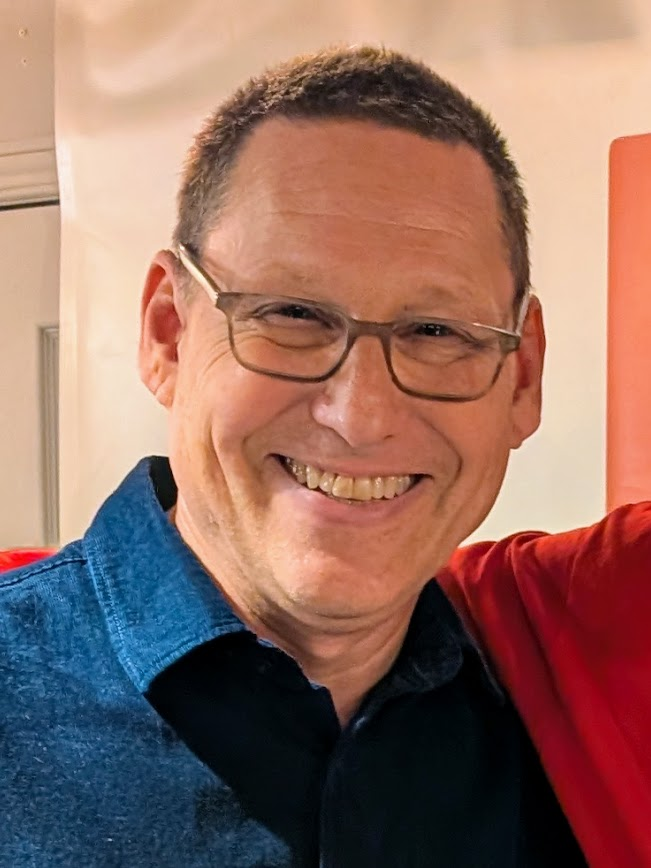
- Incumbent; Avi Lewis since March 29, 2026
- Status: Party leader
- Member of: New Democratic Party
- Appointer: Elected by members of the party
- Inaugural holder: J. S. Woodsworth (CCF); Tommy Douglas (NDP)
- Formation: August 1, 1932 (CCF); August 3, 1961 (NDP)
- Deputy: Deputy leader(s) of the New Democratic Party

The leader of the New Democratic Party (French: chef du Nouveau Parti démocratique) is the highest position in the New Democratic Party of Canada (NDP). Avi Lewis was elected as the ninth and current leader in the leadership election in March 2026.

== History ==
The New Democratic Party was founded in 1961 following the merger of the Co-operative Commonwealth Federation (CCF) and the Canadian Labour Congress. Prior to the merger, the CCF had three leaders from its founding in 1932 until the 1961 merger, with J. S. Woodsworth serving as the CCF's first leader. Following Woodsworth's death in 1942, he was replaced by M. J. Coldwell, who led the party to their best electoral performance in 1945 by winning 28 seats.

Coldwell ended up losing his seat in the 1958 election leading to a party leadership crisis. Hazen Argue, the CCF member of Parliament for Assiniboia, was named the parliamentary leader due to Coldwell's absence from the House of Commons, however he continuously persuaded Coldwell to officially step down as leader. At the time, the CCF executives were in the process of transitioning their party into a new party with closer ties to organized labour, and wanted Tommy Douglas to become the party leader. This merger was something Argue opposed, and fearing that Argue's leadership would derail the merger, party president David Lewis tried to prevent Argue from initiating a leadership challenge during the 1960 CCF convention. This attempt was ultimately unsuccessful, and Coldwell resigned on August 10, 1960. The CCF caucus elected Argue as the new leader on the following day.

Despite the leadership crisis, the merger talks continued, and eventually culminated in the New Democratic Party founding convention in the summer of 1961. During the convention, the NDP was formally established on August 3, 1961. On the same day, Argue and Douglas ran against each other for the party leadership, with Douglas winning a landslide victory to become the first leader of the NDP. Argue left the party for the Liberals shortly afterwards.

The NDP's most successful leader was Jack Layton, who served as leader from 2004 to 2011, and led the NDP to a 103 seat result in the 2011 Canadian federal election. The NDP won the second-most seats in the House of Commons, and Layton became the first leader of the NDP to serve as the leader of the Official Opposition. However, his tenure as opposition leader was very short lived, as he died from cancer a few months later.

In the 2017 New Democratic Party leadership election, the party elected Jagmeet Singh, making him the first visible minority to lead a major Canadian federal political party. Singh, who was a member of the Ontario Provincial Parliament at the time, resigned his provincial seat and was first elected to the House of Commons on February 25, 2019 for the riding of Burnaby South.

== Selection process ==
According to the New Democratic Party's constitution, the leader of the NDP must be selected through a leadership election in-which all party members may vote. Each leadership election must use an instant-runoff voting system, where the new leader is elected once they receive 50%+1 of the votes cast in the final round of voting.

If the leadership position becomes vacant, the party's national council may appoint an interim leader until a leadership convention can be held. This has happened on two occasions, the appointment of Nycole Turmel as interim leader following the death of Jack Layton in 2011, and the appointment of Don Davies as interim leader following the resignation of Jagmeet Singh after the party's defeat in the 2025 Canadian federal election.

== List of leaders ==
Co-operative Commonwealth Federation (1932–1961)
No.	Portrait	Leader	Tenure			Riding(s) (Note: Only includes House of Commons seats held by the person while they were the party's leader)	Prime Minister(s) while leader
No.	Portrait	Leader	Took office	Left office	Time in office	Riding(s)	Prime Minister(s) while leader
1		J. S. Woodsworth (1874–1942)	August 1, 1932	March 21, 1942	9 years, 232 days	Winnipeg North Centre (1921–1925); Winnipeg Centre (1925–1942)	Bennett (1930–1935); Conservative
1		J. S. Woodsworth (1874–1942)	August 1, 1932	March 21, 1942	9 years, 232 days	Winnipeg North Centre (1921–1925); Winnipeg Centre (1925–1942)	King (1935–1948); Liberal
2		M. J. Coldwell (1888–1974)	July 29, 1942	August 10, 1960	18 years, 12 days	Rosetown—Biggar (1935–1958)	King (1935–1948); Liberal
2		M. J. Coldwell (1888–1974)	July 29, 1942	August 10, 1960	18 years, 12 days	Rosetown—Biggar (1935–1958)	St. Laurent (1948–1957); Liberal
2		M. J. Coldwell (1888–1974)	July 29, 1942	August 10, 1960	18 years, 12 days	Rosetown—Biggar (1935–1958)	Diefenbaker (1957–1963); PC
3		Hazen Argue (1921–1991)	August 11, 1960	August 2, 1961	356 days	Wood Mountain (1945–1949); Assiniboia (1949–1963)	Diefenbaker (1957–1963); PC

New Democratic Party (1961–present)
No.	Portrait	Leader	Tenure			Riding(s)	Prime Minister(s) while leader
No.	Portrait	Leader	Took office	Left office	Time in office	Riding(s)	Prime Minister(s) while leader
1		Tommy Douglas (1904–1986)	August 3, 1961	April 24, 1971	9 years, 264 days	Burnaby—Coquitlam (1962–1968); Nanaimo—Cowichan—The Islands (1969–1979)	Diefenbaker (1957–1963); PC
1		Tommy Douglas (1904–1986)	August 3, 1961	April 24, 1971	9 years, 264 days	Burnaby—Coquitlam (1962–1968); Nanaimo—Cowichan—The Islands (1969–1979)	Pearson (1963–1968); Liberal
1		Tommy Douglas (1904–1986)	August 3, 1961	April 24, 1971	9 years, 264 days	Burnaby—Coquitlam (1962–1968); Nanaimo—Cowichan—The Islands (1969–1979)	P. Trudeau (1968–1979); Liberal
2		David Lewis (1909–1981)	April 24, 1971	July 7, 1975	4 years, 74 days	York South (1962–1963, 1965–1974)	P. Trudeau (1968–1979); Liberal
3		Ed Broadbent (1936–2024)	July 7, 1975	December 5, 1989	14 years, 151 days	Oshawa–Whitby (1968–1979); Oshawa (1979–1990)	P. Trudeau (1968–1979); Liberal
3		Ed Broadbent (1936–2024)	July 7, 1975	December 5, 1989	14 years, 151 days	Oshawa–Whitby (1968–1979); Oshawa (1979–1990)	Clark (1979–1980); PC
3		Ed Broadbent (1936–2024)	July 7, 1975	December 5, 1989	14 years, 151 days	Oshawa–Whitby (1968–1979); Oshawa (1979–1990)	P. Trudeau (1980–1984); Liberal
3		Ed Broadbent (1936–2024)	July 7, 1975	December 5, 1989	14 years, 151 days	Oshawa–Whitby (1968–1979); Oshawa (1979–1990)	Turner (1984); Liberal
3		Ed Broadbent (1936–2024)	July 7, 1975	December 5, 1989	14 years, 151 days	Oshawa–Whitby (1968–1979); Oshawa (1979–1990)	Mulroney (1984–1993); PC
4		Audrey McLaughlin (b. 1936)	December 5, 1989	October 14, 1995	5 years, 313 days	Yukon (1987–1997)	Mulroney (1984–1993); PC
4		Audrey McLaughlin (b. 1936)	December 5, 1989	October 14, 1995	5 years, 313 days	Yukon (1987–1997)	Campbell (1993); PC
4		Audrey McLaughlin (b. 1936)	December 5, 1989	October 14, 1995	5 years, 313 days	Yukon (1987–1997)	Chrétien (1993–2003); Liberal
5		Alexa McDonough (1944–2022)	October 14, 1995	January 25, 2003	7 years, 103 days	Halifax (1997–2008)	Chrétien (1993–2003); Liberal
6		Jack Layton (1950–2011)	January 25, 2003	August 22, 2011 (Note: On July 28, 2011, Layton took a leave of absence until his death, with Nycole Turmel serving as acting leader.)	8 years, 209 days	Toronto–Danforth (2004–2011)	Chrétien (1993–2003); Liberal
6		Jack Layton (1950–2011)	January 25, 2003	August 22, 2011	8 years, 209 days	Toronto–Danforth (2004–2011)	Martin (2003–2006); Liberal
6		Jack Layton (1950–2011)	January 25, 2003	August 22, 2011	8 years, 209 days	Toronto–Danforth (2004–2011)	Harper (2006–2015); Conservative
—		Nycole Turmel (interim leader) (b. 1942)	August 22, 2011 (Note: Turmel had been serving as acting leader of the party since July 28, 2011.)	March 24, 2012	215 days (Note: This number does not count Turmel's time in office as acting leader for Jack Layton. If this time was included, Turmel's term of office would be 240 days.)	Hull—Aylmer (2011–2015)	Harper (2006–2015); Conservative
7		Tom Mulcair (b. 1954)	March 24, 2012	October 1, 2017	5 years, 191 days	Outremont (2007–2018)	Harper (2006–2015); Conservative
7		Tom Mulcair (b. 1954)	March 24, 2012	October 1, 2017	5 years, 191 days	Outremont (2007–2018)	J. Trudeau (2015–2025); Liberal
8		Jagmeet Singh (b. 1979)	October 1, 2017	May 5, 2025	7 years, 216 days	Burnaby South (2019–2025)	J. Trudeau (2015–2025); Liberal
8		Jagmeet Singh (b. 1979)	October 1, 2017	May 5, 2025	7 years, 216 days	Burnaby South (2019–2025)	Carney (2025–present); Liberal
—		Don Davies (interim leader) (b. 1963)	May 5, 2025	March 29, 2026	328 days	Vancouver Kingsway (since 2008)	Carney (2025–present); Liberal
9		Avi Lewis (b. 1967)	March 29, 2026	Incumbent	238 days	–	Carney (2025–present); Liberal

== Related positions ==
=== Deputy leaders ===
NDP deputy leader	Term start	Term end	Riding(s)	NDP leader	Notes
Bill Blaikie	August 1, 2004	October 14, 2008	Elmwood—Transcona	Jack Layton	
Tom Mulcair	September 27, 2007	October 12, 2011	Outremont	Jack Layton; Nycole Turmel	
Libby Davies	September 27, 2007	October 18, 2015	Vancouver East	Jack Layton; Nycole Turmel; Tom Mulcair	
Megan Leslie	April 19, 2012	October 18, 2015	Halifax	Tom Mulcair	
David Christopherson	April 19, 2012	March 11, 2019	Hamilton Centre	Tom Mulcair; Jagmeet Singh	
Sheri Benson	March 14, 2019	October 20, 2019	Saskatoon West	Jagmeet Singh	
Alexandre Boulerice	March 14, 2019	April 27, 2026	Rosemont—La Petite-Patrie	Jagmeet Singh; Don Davies; Avi Lewis	

=== Federal caucus leadership positions ===
==== House Leaders ====
NDP house leader	Term start	Term end	Riding(s)	Notes
Stanley Knowles	September 1962	September 3, 1984	Winnipeg North Centre	
Ian Deans	September 4, 1984	September 3, 1986	Hamilton Mountain	Acting NDP house leader from 1981 to 1984
Nelson Riis	September 5, 1986	January 11, 1994	Kamloops—Shuswap (1980–1988); Kamloops (1988–2000)	
Len Taylor	January 12, 1994	January 10, 1996	The Battlefords—Meadow Lake	
Bill Blaikie	January 11, 1996	February 5, 2003	Winnipeg—Transcona	
Libby Davies	February 6, 2003	May 25, 2011	Vancouver East	
Tom Mulcair	May 26, 2011	October 12, 2011	Outremont	Opposition House Leader
Joe Comartin	October 13, 2011	April 14, 2012	Windsor—Tecumseh	Opposition House Leader
Nathan Cullen	April 19, 2012	March 19, 2014	Skeena—Bulkley Valley	Opposition House Leader
Peter Julian (1 of 3)	March 20, 2014	October 18, 2016	Burnaby—New Westminster (2004–2015); New Westminster—Burnaby (2015–2025)	Opposition House Leader (March 20, 2014 to October 20, 2015)
Murray Rankin	October 19, 2016	October 23, 2017	Victoria	
Peter Julian (2 of 3)	October 24, 2017	January 24, 2018	New Westminster—Burnaby	
Ruth Ellen Brosseau	January 25, 2018	March 13, 2019	Berthier—Maskinongé	
Peter Julian (3 of 3)	March 14, 2019	April 28, 2025	New Westminster—Burnaby	
Alexandre Boulerice	May 28, 2025	April 10, 2026	Rosemont—La Petite-Patrie	
Heather McPherson	April 10, 2026	Incumbent	Edmonton Strathcona	

==== Party whips ====
NDP party whips	Term start	Term end	Riding(s)	Notes
Stanley Knowles	1962	December 1972	Winnipeg North Centre	
William George Knight	January 3, 1973	1974	Assiniboia	
Lorne Edmund Nystrom	June 1974	1981	Yorkton—Melville	
Neil Young	October 1981	October 28, 1984	Beaches	
Victor Fredrich Althouse	October 29, 1984	September 4, 1986	Humboldt—Lake Centre	
Rodney Edward Murphy	September 5, 1986	January 21, 1990	Churchill	
Iain Angus	January 22, 1990	October 24, 1993	Thunder Bay—Atikokan	
Christopher Axworthy	September 6, 1994	January 10, 1996	Saskatoon—Clark's Crossing	
John Solomon	January 11, 1996	January 30, 2000	Regina—Lumsden (1993–1997); Regina—Lumsden—Lake Centre (1997–2000)	
Yvon Godin	February 1, 2000	May 25, 2011	Acadie—Bathurst	Chief Opposition Whip (May 2–25, 2011)
Chris Charlton	May 26, 2011	April 18, 2012	Hamilton Mountain	Chief Opposition Whip
Nycole Turmel	April 19, 2012	November 11, 2015	Hull—Aylmer	Chief Opposition Whip
Marjolaine Boutin-Sweet	November 12, 2015	March 13, 2019	Hochelaga	
Ruth Ellen Brosseau	March 14, 2019	October 20, 2019	Berthier—Maskinongé	
Rachel Blaney	November 26, 2019	April 4, 2024	North Island—Powell River	
Heather McPherson	April 5, 2024	April 28, 2025	Edmonton Strathcona	
Don Davies	April 10, 2026	Incumbent	Vancouver Kingsway	

==== Parliamentary leaders ====
- Herbert Wilfred Herridge (1961–1962)
- David Lewis (1968–1969)
- Ed Broadbent (1974–1975)
- Audrey McLaughlin (1995–1997)
- Bill Blaikie (2003–2004)
- Guy Caron (2017–2019)
- Don Davies (2026–present)

=== Party executive positions ===
==== Presidents ====
- Michael Kelway Oliver (1961–1963)
- Merv Johnson (1963–1965)
- Eamon Park (1965–1967)
- James Renwick (1967–1969)
- Allan Blakeney (1969–1971)
- Donald C. MacDonald (1971–1975)
- Joyce Nash (1975–1977)
- Alvin Hewitt (1977–1981)
- Tony Penikett (1981–1985)
- Marion Dewar (1985–1987)
- Johanna den Hertog (1987–1989)
- Sandra Mitchell (1989–1991)
- Nancy Riche (1991–1995)
- Iain Angus (1995–1997)
- Ed Tchorzewski (1997–1999)
- Dave MacKinnon (c. 1999–2000)
- Adam Giambrone (2001–2006)
- Anne McGrath (2006–2009)
- Peggy Nash (2009–2011)
- Brian Topp (2011)
- Rebecca Blaikie (2011–2016)
- Marit Stiles (2016–2018)
- Mathieu Vick (2018–2021)
- Dhananjai Kohli (2021–2023)
- Mary Shortall (2023–2026)
- Niall Ricardo (2026–present)

==== Vice presidents ====
- Laurie Antonin (2023–2026)
- Libby Davies (2026–present)

== See also ==
- History of the New Democratic Party
- New Democratic Party leadership elections
- List of Canadian conservative leaders
- Leader of the Liberal Party of Canada
