= Hazen Argue =

Canadian politician (1921–1991)

The Honourable Hazen Argue PC
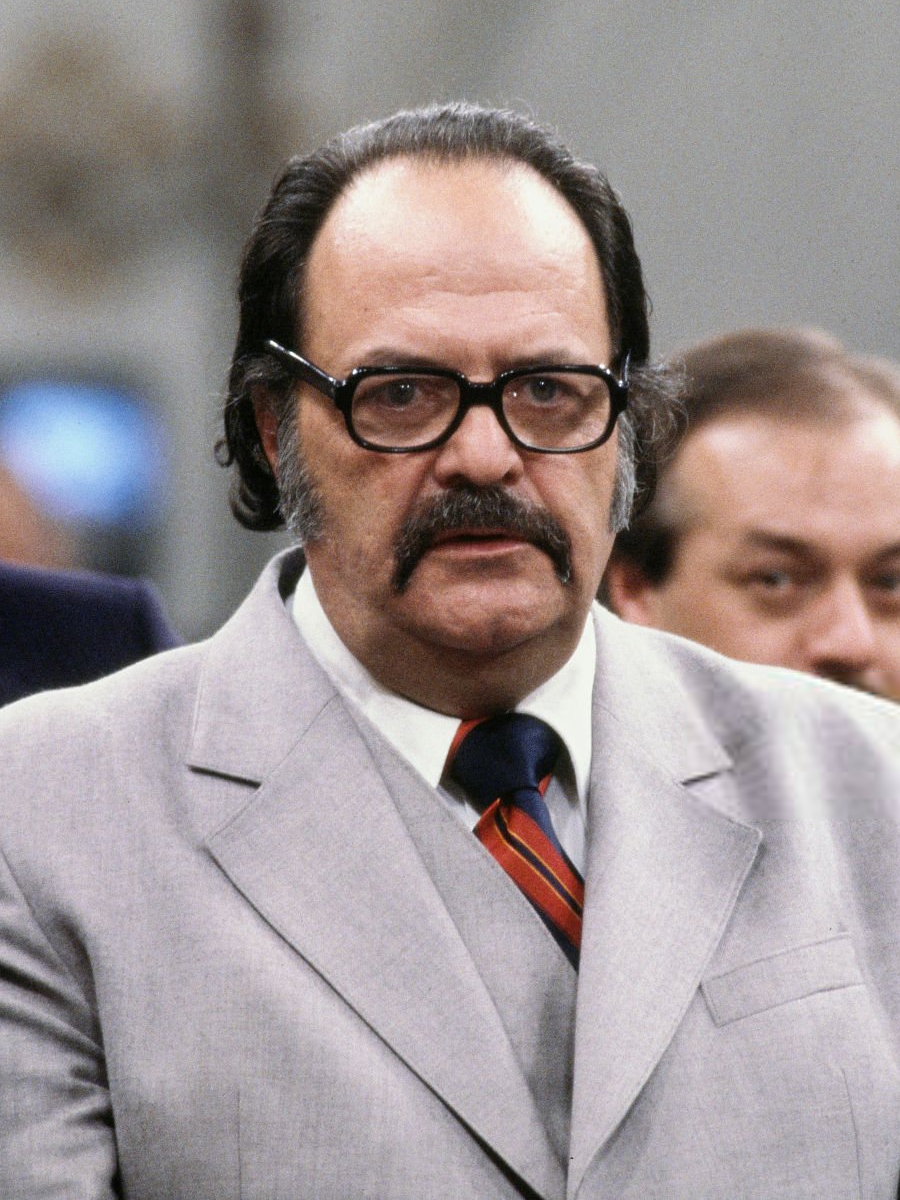
- Argue in 1981

3rd Leader of the Co-operative Commonwealth Federation
- In office August 11, 1960 – August 2, 1961
- Preceded by: M. J. Coldwell
- Succeeded by: Tommy Douglas (as leader of the NDP)

Parliamentary leader of the Co-operative Commonwealth Federation
- In office March 31, 1958 – August 11, 1960
- Leader: M. J. Coldwell
- Preceded by: M. J. Coldwell (as leader)
- Succeeded by: Himself (as leader)

Senator from Saskatchewan
- In office February 24, 1966 – October 2, 1991
- Nominated by: Lester B. Pearson
- Appointed by: Georges Vanier

Member of Parliament for Assiniboia
- In office June 27, 1949 – April 8, 1963
- Preceded by: Edward McCullough
- Succeeded by: Lawrence Watson

Member of Parliament for Wood Mountain
- In office June 11, 1945 – June 27, 1949
- Preceded by: Thomas Donnelly
- Succeeded by: District abolished (1947)

Personal details
- Born: Hazen Robert Argue; January 6, 1921 Kayville, Saskatchewan, Canada
- Died: October 2, 1991 (aged 70) Regina, Saskatchewan, Canada
- Party: CCF (1945–1961); New Democratic Party (1961–1962); Liberal (1962–1991)
- Cabinet: Minister of State (Canadian Wheat Board) (1980–1984)
- Committees: Chair, Special Committee on Preventive Health Care; Chair, Standing Committee on Agriculture

Hazen Robert Argue PC (January 6, 1921 – October 2, 1991) was a Canadian politician who served in the House of Commons and the Senate. He was first elected as a Co-operative Commonwealth Federation (CCF) Member of Parliament (MP) in 1945 and was the last leader of the party, from 1960 to 1961. He crossed the floor to the Liberal Party in 1962 and was defeated in 1963. In 1966 he was appointed to the Senate. He entered the federal cabinet in 1980, as the only Saskatchewan representative, with responsibilities for the Canadian Wheat Board. He is well known for being a strong proponent of the proposed Canadian annexation of the Turks and Caicos Islands. He was the first senator ever to have been charged with fraud, in 1989. The charges were eventually dropped.

== Political career ==
=== Political beginnings ===
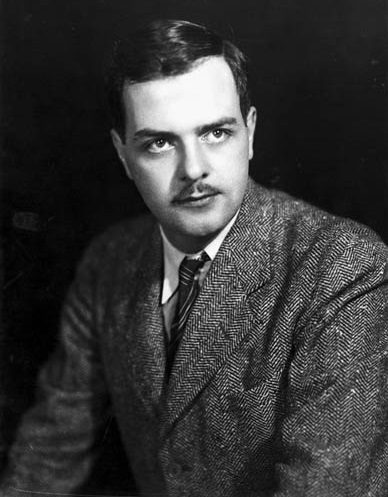
Argue c. 1942–1948

His family owned a farm, which he worked until he entered the House of Commons. He was first elected to Parliament in 1945 as a member of the Co-operative Commonwealth Federation (CCF). At 24 years of age, he was the youngest MP at that time. After the Diefenbaker sweep of 1958, Argue was one of only eight CCFers remaining in Parliament and the only one from Saskatchewan. Party leader M. J. Coldwell lost his seat, and the CCF parliamentary caucus chose Argue as their House Leader. After Coldwell resigned as the national CCF leader in 1960, Argue was elected leader at the party's last convention in the summer of 1960.

At the time, the CCF was engaged in a three-year plan to create a new party from the union between itself and organized labour forces as represented by the Canadian Labour Congress (CLC). Both the CCF and CLC executives approved going down this route starting in April 1958. Argue, like many grassroot CCFers, was not convinced that this merger was necessarily the best route to revitalizing the party. As an organizing tool during this period, the organization was called the New Party. New Party clubs sprung up around the country between 1958 and 1961. On October 31, 1960, Walter Pitman won a stunning by-election victory in Peterborough under the banner of the New Party. This gave credibility to the forces organizing to remodel the CCF along the British Labour Party model. Argue became a candidate in the race to be the first leader of the newly formed NDP at their August 3, 1961 leadership convention. He was up against long-time Saskatchewan Premier, and CCF favourite-son, Tommy Douglas. Douglas had the support of the CLC, its president Claude Jodoin and CCF president David Lewis. Douglas easily defeated him 1,391 votes to 380 votes on a single ballot. In his concession speech, Argue declared, "No matter what my role is in the years ahead, I shall speak for you. I shall work for you, I shall never let you down." He remained in the party's caucus, in the House of Commons, for the rest of the year, having little contact with Douglas in that time.

=== Liberal floor crossing ===
Six months later, Argue crossed the floor to join the Liberal Party; he argued that divisions were rife in the NDP and that farmers' interests were overwhelmed by those of labour. He was re-elected as a Liberal Member of Parliament (MP) in 1962 but was defeated in 1963 and again in 1965. In 1966, Argue was appointed to the Senate as a Liberal.

After the 1980 election, in which the Liberal Party failed to win any seats west of Winnipeg, Prime Minister Pierre Trudeau appointed Argue to Cabinet as Minister of State (Canada Wheat Board).

=== Senate of Canada ===
In 1989, he became the first senator ever charged with misuse of public funds and fraud. The RCMP alleged that he used public funds to help his wife's bid to obtain the Liberal Party nomination in their Ottawa-area riding for the 1988 Canadian federal election. The charges were dropped in 1991 by the crown prosecutor when it became apparent that Argue was near death, as he had been bedridden for most of the year with cancer. He died three months later in Regina, on October 2, 1991.
