= Opinion polling for the 1963 Canadian federal election =

This article is about polls leading up to the 1963 Canadian federal election.

== During the 25th Parliament of Canada ==
Evolution of voting intentions at national level
Polling firm	Last day of survey	Source	LPC	PC	NDP	Other	ME	Sample
Election 1963	April 8, 1963		41.48	32.80	13.22	12.50		
Gallup	April 3, 1963		41	32	14	13	—	—
Gallup	March 9, 1963		41	32	11	16	—	—
Gallup	February 2, 1963		47	33	10	11	—	—
Gallup	January 1963		47	32	10	11	—	—
Gallup	October 1962		47	33	9	11	—	—
Election 1962	June 18, 1962		36.97	37.22	13.57	12.24		

== Regional polling ==
=== Quebec ===
Evolution of voting intentions at national level
Polling firm	Last day of survey	Source	LPC	PC	NDP	Other	ME	Sample
Election 1963	April 8, 1963		45.6	19.5	7.1	27.8		
Gallup	February 1963		47	33	11	11	—	—
Election 1962	June 18, 1962		40	30	4	26		

=== Ontario ===
Evolution of voting intentions at national level
Polling firm	Last day of survey	Source	LPC	PC	NDP	Other	ME	Sample
Election 1963	April 8, 1963		45.8	35.0	16.2	3.0		
Gallup	February 1963		47	37	15	1	—	—
Election 1962	June 18, 1962		42	39	17	2		
