= 1963 Canadian federal election =

- April 8, 1963

265 seats in the House of Commons 133 seats needed for a majority
- Opinion polls
- Turnout: 79.2% (▲0.2 pp)
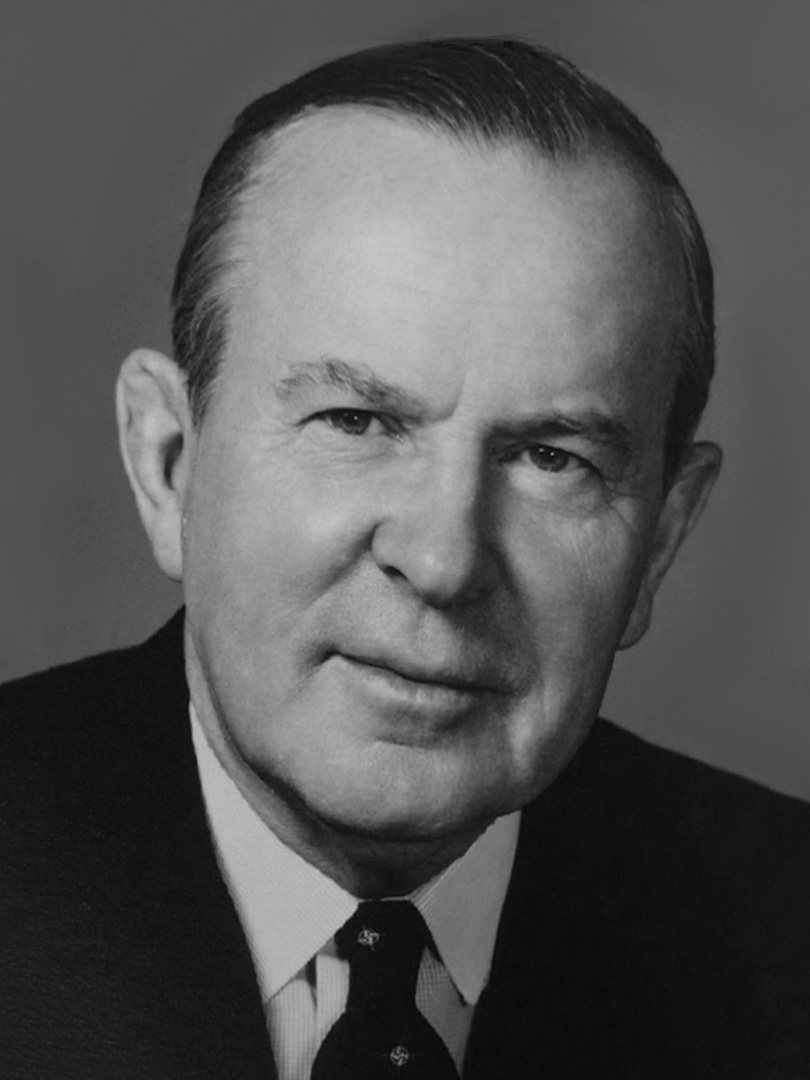

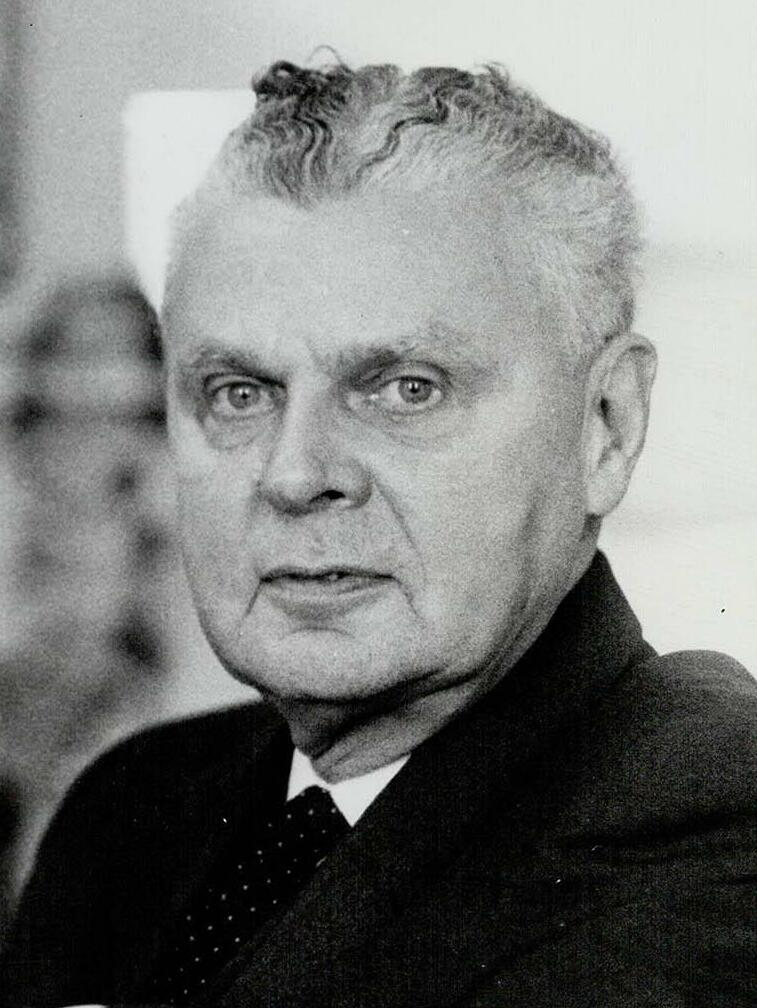

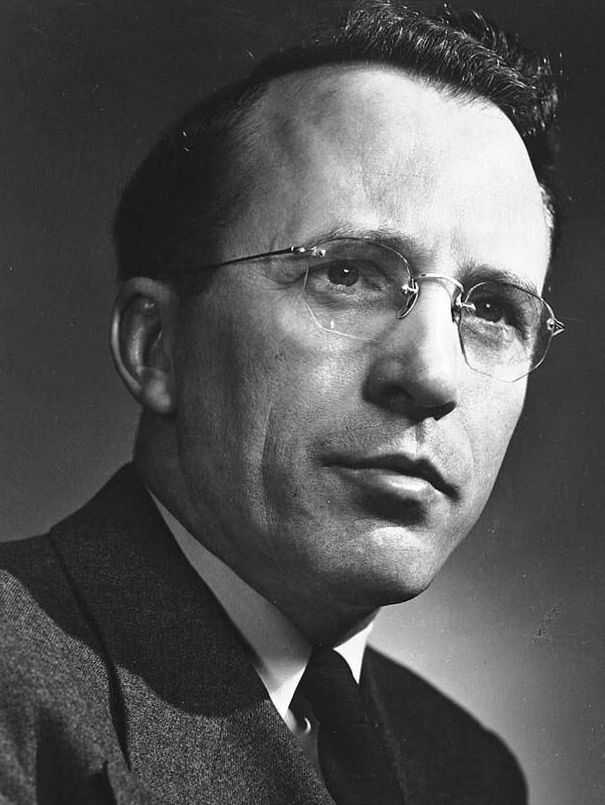
	First party	Second party
Leader	Lester B. Pearson	John Diefenbaker
Party	Liberal	Progressive Conservative
Leader since	January 16, 1958	December 14, 1956
Leader's seat	Algoma East	Prince Albert
Last election	99 seats, 36.97%	116 seats, 37.22%
Seats won	128	95
Seat change	▲29	▼21
Popular vote	3,276,996	2,591,613
Percentage	41.48%	32.80%
Swing	▲4.51 pp	▼4.42 pp
	Third party	Fourth party
	SC
Leader	Robert N. Thompson	Tommy Douglas
Party	Social Credit	New Democratic
Leader since	July 7, 1961	August 3, 1961
Leader's seat	Red Deer	Burnaby—Coquitlam
Last election	30 seats, 11.61%	19 seats, 13.57%
Seats won	24	17
Seat change	▼6	▼2
Popular vote	940,703	1,044,701
Percentage	11.91%	13.22%
Swing	▲0.30 pp	▼0.35 pp

- The Canadian parliament after the 1963 election
Prime Minister before election
John Diefenbaker
Progressive Conservative
Prime Minister after election
Lester B. Pearson
Liberal

The 1963 Canadian federal election was held on April 8, 1963, to elect members of the House of Commons of Canada of the 26th Parliament of Canada. It resulted in the defeat of the minority Progressive Conservative (Tory) government of Prime Minister John Diefenbaker, with the Liberals returning to power for the first time in 6 years, where they would remain for twenty of the next twenty-one years (winning every election except the 1979 election until their landslide defeat in 1984). For the Social Credit Party, despite getting their highest ever share of the vote, the party lost 6 seats compared to its high-water mark in 1962.

The 1963 election was the first in which all of the Northwest Territories were contained in an electoral district. Consequently, it was also the first election in which 100% of Canadian territory was represented in Parliament.

== Overview ==
During the Tories' last year in office, members of the Diefenbaker Cabinet attempted to remove him from the leadership of the party, and therefore from the Prime Minister's office. In addition to concern within the party about Diefenbaker's mercurial style of leadership, there had been a serious split in party ranks over the issue of cancelling the AVRO Arrow un-employing 50,000 aerospace workers and stationing American nuclear missiles (see Bomarc missile) on Canadian soil for protection from possible Soviet attack. Diefenbaker and his allies opposed this proposal, while many other Conservatives and the opposition Liberal Party were in favour. Minister of National Defence Douglas Harkness resigned from Cabinet on February 4, 1963, because of Diefenbaker's opposition to accepting the missiles.

When it turned out that nearly half of his cabinet was also prepared to resign over the issue, Diefenbaker announced that he himself would resign with immediate effect and recommend that the Governor General appoint Minister of Justice Donald Fleming as acting Prime Minister pending a new Progressive Conservative leadership convention. Diefenbaker's allies persuaded him not to go through with the resignation, however the furore caused by the cabinet split and Diefenbaker's rejecting a proposed deal with the Social Credit Party, whose support the Progressive Conservatives had been relying on to remain in power since the previous election, resulted in Diefenbaker's government losing two non-confidence motions the next day and consequently falling. The House was dissolved on February 6.

The Liberal Party of Lester Pearson were ahead of the Tories when the election was called; it looked inevitable that they would form a majority government. Their campaign began to falter, however. It started to falter when Pearson was struck down with a bout of ill-health which precluded him from actively campaigning. More importantly, it also started to falter when the U.S. Department of Defense leaked a document detailing the proposed missile defences (which ironically may have been done in an effort to help Pearson's campaign); this allowed Diefenbaker to accuse the United States of wanting to use Canada as a decoy to lessen the potential damage to its cities in the event of a nuclear exchange with the Soviet Union. The Tories surged in the polls, leaving it briefly looking possible that they might not only be able to continue in power; it was possible that they may even return to majority government status. Ultimately, the Liberals were able to regain the momentum with a platform promising that, if elected, they would begin their term with "60 Days of Decision" on several key questions, while Diefenbaker's repeated attacks on President Kennedy had limited effectiveness. The Tories' refusal to work with the Socreds also proved damaging, contributing to their losing ground in British Columbia, where they slipped to third place behind the Liberals and NDP.

Kennedy strongly favoured Pearson and made an effort to help his election campaign. Kennedy sent his consultant, Lou Harris, to work on the Pearson campaign and General Lauris Norstad publicly criticised the Conservatives for not meeting their NATO contributions. Harris later said "One of the highlights of my life was helping Pearson".

Despite winning 41% of the vote, which is usually sufficient for ensuring the election of a majority government, the Liberals came up five seats short of a majority due to winning only six seats in the Prairies. The Liberals formed a minority government that was dependent on the support of the social democratic New Democratic Party (NDP) in order to pass legislation.

The social-democratic NDP had been formed in 1961 by a socialist party, the Co-operative Commonwealth Federation, and by the Canadian Labour Congress. The 1963 election was the second vote contested by the NDP. The party won slightly fewer votes, and two fewer seats, than they had received in the 1962 election. They were again disappointed by the failure of their new partnership with the labour movement to produce an electoral breakthrough, particularly in the province of Ontario, which has the largest population and the largest number of seats in the House of Commons.

The Social Credit Party was unable to increase its representation in western Canada, and lost four of its Quebec seats despite gaining a slightly better share of the vote compared to 1962. Indeed, 1963 represented the highest share the party would ever get. The continuing lopsided result led to a split in the party when leader Robert N. Thompson refused to step aside in favour of his deputy, Réal Caouette, the longtime leader of the social credit movement in Quebec. The Socred MPs from Quebec considered Caouette their leader, not Thompson. Ultimately, Caouette and his followers left the Social Credit Party to sit as the Ralliement des créditistes.

== National results ==

Party	Party leader	# of candidates	Seats			Popular vote		
Party	Party leader	# of candidates	1962	Elected	% Change	#	%	pp Change
Liberal	Lester Pearson	265	99	128	+29.3%	3,276,996	41.48%	+4.51
Progressive Conservative	John Diefenbaker	265	116	95	-18.1%	2,591,613	32.80%	-4.42
Social Credit	R.N. Thompson	224	30	24	-20.0%	940,703	11.91%	+0.30
New Democrats	Tommy Douglas	232	19	17	-10.5%	1,044,701	13.22%	-0.35
Liberal-Labour		1	1	1	-	16,794	0.21%	+0.01
Independent Liberal		6	-	-	-	14,658	0.19%	+0.05
Independent		9	-	-	-	5,236	0.07%	-0.04
Communist	Leslie Morris	12	-	-	-	4,234	0.05%	-0.03
Independent PC		2	-	-	-	1,965	0.02%	-0.01
Independent Conservative		2	*	-	*	1,159	0.01%	*
Ouvrier Indépendant		1	-	-	-	1,064	0.01%	+0.01
Independent Social Credit		2	*	-	*	717	0.01%	*
Nationalist		1	*	-	*	540	0.01%	*
Candidat libéral des electeurs		1	-	-	-	496	0.01%	-0.02
Socialist Labour		1	*	-	*	43	x	*
Total		1,023	265	265	-	7,900,919	100%	
Sources: http://www.elections.ca History of Federal Ridings since 1867

Notes:

* The party did not nominate candidates in the previous election.

x - less than 0.005% of the popular vote

== Vote and seat summaries ==
Ternary plots - shift of electoral support (1962-1963)
1962

1963
Electoral districts identified by colours of winning parties

Popular vote
Liberal	41.48%
PC	32.80%
NDP	13.22%
Social Credit	11.91%
Others	0.59%

Seat totals
Liberal	48.30%
PC	35.84%
Social Credit	9.05%
NDP	6.41%
Others	0.37%

== Results by province ==
Party name		BC	AB	SK	MB	ON	QC	NB	NS	PE	NL	YK	NW	Total
Liberal	Seats:	7	1	-	2	51	47	6	5	2	7	-	-	128
Liberal	Popular Vote:	32.3	22.1	24.1	33.8	45.8	45.6	47.3	46.7	46.4	64.5	41.0	43.2	41.5
Progressive Conservative	Seats:	4	14	17	10	27	8	4	7	2	-	1	1	95
Progressive Conservative	Vote:	23.4	45.3	53.7	42.3	35.0	19.5	40.4	46.9	52.0	30.1	49.6	56.8	32.8
Social Credit	Seats:	2	2	-	-	-	20	-	-			-		24
Social Credit	Vote:	13.3	25.8	3.9	7.0	2.0	27.3	8.6	0.1			9.4		11.9
New Democrats	Seats:	9	-	-	2	6	-	-	-	-	-			17
New Democrats	Vote:	30.3	6.5	18.2	16.7	16.2	7.1	3.7	6.4	1.6	4.2			13.2
Liberal-Labour	Seats:					1								1
Liberal-Labour	Vote:					0.6								0.2
Total seats:		22	17	17	14	85	75	10	12	4	7	1	1	265
Parties that won no seats:
Independent Liberal	Vote:					0.3	0.1				1.3			0.2
Independent	Vote:	xx	0.1	xx	0.2	xx	0.1							0.1
Communist	Vote:	0.1	0.1	0.1		0.1	xx							0.1
Independent PC	Vote:					xx	0.1							xx
Independent Conservative	Vote:					xx								xx
Ouvrier Indépendant	Vote:						0.1							xx
Independent Social Credit	Vote:						xx							xx
Nationalist	Vote:						xx							xx
C. l. des electeurs	Vote:						xx							xx
Socialist Labour	Vote:						xx							xx

- xx - less than 0.05% of the popular vote

== See also ==
- List of Canadian federal general elections
- List of political parties in Canada
- 26th Canadian Parliament
