= Parliamentary leader (Canada) =

In Canada, a parliamentary leader typically refers to a member of Parliament who acts as the party leader when the actual leader of the party does not sit in the House of Commons. Parliamentary leaders are typically appointed in the event that the party leader loses their seat in an election but does not resign as party leader or when a party elects a new leader that has not yet been elected to a seat in the House of Commons. It is common for a party's deputy leader or house leader to take on this role. In instances where the leader of the party with Official Opposition status does not sit in the House, the parliamentary leader will automatically assume the position of leader of the Opposition.

== History ==
The first notable instance of a parliamentary leader being appointed occurred in 1958, when Co-operative Commonwealth Federation (CCF) leader M. J. Coldwell lost his seat in the 1958 Canadian federal election. Despite facing some pressure to do so, Coldwell did not immediately resign as leader of the party, and appointed CCF MP Hazen Argue to act as the CCF party leader in the 24th Canadian Parliament. Argue served in this role until 1960, when he was eventually selected by the CCF caucus to become the actual party leader following a leadership succession crisis.

From 2011 to 2019, the leadership of the Bloc Québécois was very unstable as the party went through 7 leaders in 9 years, with many party leaders and interim leaders not holding a seat in the House of Commons for parts of their tenure as leader. As a result, the party routinely nominated a parliamentary leader, often assigning the role to the party's House Leader.

The Liberal Party often avoided appointing a parliamentary leader as each time the Liberal leader did not hold a seat in the House, the Liberals were also in government, and were able to use their governmental privileges to quickly return their leader to Parliament if necessary. William Lyon Mackenzie King lost his seat twice in general elections while serving as prime minister, and used his executive position to quickly schedule a by-election to re-enter Parliament before or very soon after the first parliamentary session began. When Mark Carney was elected as the Liberal leader and prime minister in 2025, he did not hold a seat, but requested an early dissolution of parliament, which prevented any absence in parliament as he would go on to win a seat in the subsequent general election. However, when John Turner was elected as the Liberal leader and prime minister in 1984, he did not immediately dissolve parliament, and famously attended parliamentary sittings by observing the proceedings from a viewing gallery. Turner appointed Jean Chrétien (who did have a seat in the House of Commons) as his deputy prime minister, essentially making Chrétien the Liberal parliamentary leader.

== Notable federal parliamentary leaders ==
Parliamentary leader	Term	Party caucus	Party leader	Reason for leader's absence
George Foster	June 16, 1891 – November 24, 1892	Conservative	John Abbott	Led the party from the Senate
George Foster	December 21, 1894 – January 15, 1896	Conservative	Mackenzie Bowell	Led the party from the Senate
Daniel Duncan McKenzie	August 7, 1919 – October 20, 1919	Liberal	William Lyon Mackenzie King	Elected leader without a seat
Ernest Lapointe	October 28, 1925 – February 15, 1926	Liberal	William Lyon Mackenzie King	Lost seat
John Horne Blackmore	October 14, 1935 – April 6, 1944 (Note: The federal Social Credit Party lacked an official leader until 1944, with Aberhart being seen as the movement's de facto national leader until his death in 1943, and Herridge leading the alliance of the Social Credit and New Democracy parties during the 1940 Canadian federal election.)	Social Credit	William Aberhart	Did not contest election
John Horne Blackmore	October 14, 1935 – April 6, 1944	Social Credit	William Duncan Herridge	Failed to win a seat
John Horne Blackmore	April 6, 1944 – June 11, 1945	Social Credit	Solon Earl Low	Elected leader without a seat
M. J. Coldwell	September 30, 1940 – March 21, 1942 (Note: Coldwell had been the party's de facto parliamentary leader since September 8, 1939, when Woodsworth was effectively relieved of his duties due to his opposition to Canada's entry into World War II. Woodsworth was permanently incapacitated by a stroke in September 1940, at which point Coldwell formally became parliamentary leader.)	Co-operative Commonwealth	J. S. Woodsworth	Illness
Richard Hanson	November 12, 1941 – December 9, 1942	Conservative	Arthur Meighen	Led the party from the Senate
Richard Hanson	November 12, 1941 – December 9, 1942	Conservative	Arthur Meighen	Failed to win a seat (Note: Meighen was a senator during his first two months as party leader, then resigned from the Senate in an unsuccessful attempt to win a seat in the House of Commons; afterwards, he did not make another attempt to enter Parliament for the remainder of his leadership.)
Gordon Graydon	January 1, 1943 – June 10, 1945	Progressive Conservative	John Bracken	Elected leader without a seat
Hazen Argue	March 31, 1958 – August 11, 1960	Co-operative Commonwealth	M. J. Coldwell	Lost seat
Herbert Herridge	August 3, 1961 – October 22, 1962	New Democratic	Tommy Douglas	Elected leader without a seat
Michael Starr	September 9, 1967 – November 6, 1967	Progressive Conservative	Robert Stanfield	Elected leader without a seat
David Lewis	June 25, 1968 – February 10, 1969	New Democratic	Tommy Douglas	Lost seat
Ed Broadbent	July 8, 1974 – July 7, 1975	New Democratic	David Lewis	Lost seat
Charles-Arthur Gauthier	May 7, 1978 – May 22, 1979	Social Credit	Lorne Reznowski	Elected leader without a seat
Charles-Arthur Gauthier	May 7, 1978 – May 22, 1979	Social Credit	Fabien Roy	Elected leader without a seat
Erik Nielsen	June 11, 1983 – August 29, 1983	Progressive Conservative	Brian Mulroney	Elected leader without a seat
Jean Chrétien	June 30, 1984 – September 17, 1984	Liberal	John Turner	Elected leader without a seat
Herb Gray	February 8, 1990 – June 23, 1990	Liberal	John Turner	Resigned parliamentary leadership
Herb Gray	June 23, 1990 – December 10, 1990	Liberal	Jean Chrétien	Elected leader without a seat
Elsie Wayne	November 14, 1998 – September 11, 2000	Progressive Conservative	Joe Clark	Elected leader without a seat
Bill Blaikie	January 25, 2003 – June 28, 2004	New Democratic	Jack Layton	Elected leader without a seat
Grant Hill	January 9, 2004 – March 19, 2004	Conservative	John Lynch-Staunton	Led as interim leader from the Senate
Louis Plamondon	June 2, 2011 – December 11, 2011	Bloc Québécois	Vivian Barbot	Appointed interim leader without seat (Note: BQ leader Gilles Duceppe lost his seat in the 2011 federal election and resigned as party leader immediately on May 2, 2011. He was replaced by interim leader Vivian Barbot who also did not win a seat in 2011.)
Louis Plamondon	December 11, 2011 – December 16, 2013	Bloc Québécois	Daniel Paillé	Elected leader without a seat
André Bellavance	December 16, 2013 – February 25, 2014	Bloc Québécois	vacant	Vacant leadership position
Jean-François Fortin	February 26, 2014 – August 12, 2014	Bloc Québécois	vacant	Vacant leadership position
Jean-François Fortin	February 26, 2014 – August 12, 2014	Bloc Québécois	Mario Beaulieu	Elected leader without a seat
Louis Plamondon	August 12, 2014 – October 22, 2015	Bloc Québécois	Gilles Duceppe	Appointed without a seat
Gabriel Ste-Marie	March 19, 2017 – February 26, 2018	Bloc Québécois	Martine Ouellet	Elected leader without a seat
Guy Caron	October 4, 2017 – February 25, 2019	New Democratic	Jagmeet Singh	Elected leader without a seat
Mario Beaulieu	January 17, 2019 – October 21, 2019	Bloc Québécois	Yves-François Blanchet	Elected leader without a seat
Elizabeth May	November 4, 2019 – October 3, 2020	Green	Jo-Ann Roberts	Appointed interim leader without a seat
Elizabeth May	October 3, 2020 – November 14, 2021	Green	Annamie Paul	Elected leader without a seat
Elizabeth May	November 14, 2021 – November 19, 2022	Green	Amita Kuttner	Appointed interim leader without a seat
Elizabeth May	November 14, 2026 – present	Green	Mike Morrice	Elected leader without a seat
Andrew Scheer	May 6, 2025 – August 18, 2025	Conservative	Pierre Poilievre	Lost seat
Don Davies	April 10, 2026 – present	New Democratic	Avi Lewis	Elected leader without a seat

== See also ==
- Interim leader (Canada)
- House Leader
