= Proposed Canadian political association with the Turks and Caicos Islands =

Annexation proposal by the Canadian government

Canada–Turks and Caicos Islands relations

- Canada: Turks and Caicos Islands

The potential political association of the Turks and Caicos Islands along with Canada is a recurring topic perennially discussed at times in various cross sections of society of both nations, and usually emerging in discourse during northern hemispheric winter. The islands are currently a British Overseas Territory under the sovereignty of the United Kingdom which covers the territory's foreign affairs and national defence.

The idea of annexation has occasionally been discussed at both the federal and provincial levels in Canada. While the Canadian government has previously indicated that it would be open to exploring methods of increasing economic and social ties with the Turks and Caicos, there has been no official statement on opening discussion from the Canadian government on the notion of transferring sovereignty over the territory from the United Kingdom.

There have been informal media polls on the matter but no official public opinion polling indicating support (or lack thereof) to the idea of annexation, nor a consensus in either nation on how it would happen. Furthermore, significant socioeconomic, diplomatic, constitutional, and political hurdles would need to be overcome to achieve incorporation of the islands, which has raised questions on its feasibility.

== History ==
=== Early years ===
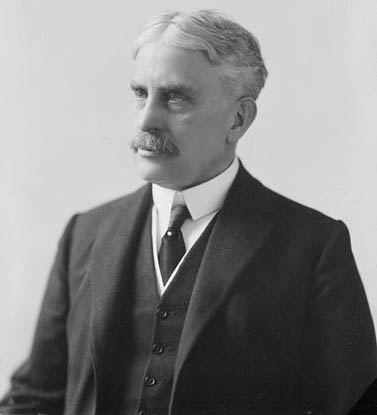
Canadian Prime Minister Robert Borden (1911-1920), a supporter of Canadian annexation of the Turks and Caicos Islands

In the U.K's moves towards providing responsible self-governance in the West Indies in compliance with the United Nations list of non-self-governing territories, the Turks and Caicos operated as a dependency of Jamaica since 1873 with the aim of consolidating governance in the region. The history of the proposal for Canada to assume some role extends back as far as 1917, when Canadian Prime Minister Robert Borden first raised the idea of Canada taking over responsibility of the islands from the United Kingdom. The idea was raised at the Imperial Conference of that year, only to be shot down by UK Prime Minister David Lloyd George, a known supporter of strong shipping ports for his home country.

=== Reemergence of the political association movement (1970s) ===
In 1960s with moves by Jamaica toward independence in 1962 following the collapse of the 4 years old British West Indies Federation prior to reaching Dominion status, the Turks and Caicos successfully campaigned not to be pushed into political independence simply due to the majority in Jamaica moving in that direction. The Turks and Caicos was then placed under the governance of the Commonwealth of the Bahamas with which it shares the Lucayan Archipelago chain. Interest within the Turks and Caicos in joining the Canadian confederation reemerged as a serious proposal in the early 1970s. Other British possessions in the Caribbean declared independence from the United Kingdom throughout the mid-20th century, including Jamaica and Trinidad and Tobago in 1962, Barbados in 1966, and, importantly for the neighbouring Turks and Caicos, the Bahamas in 1973. Due to growing sentiment in the Bahamas islands to seek political independence, the Turks and Caicos again sought a separation; this time, it sought independence from the Bahamas before it too was granted independence in 1973 leading to a re-evaluation of the TCI's future.

In response to this, on 15 March 1973, the islands' territorial council prepared a petition to the Canadian government seeking a closer form of association and asking Britain's permission to do so. The council sought to expand its economic integration with its large North American neighbour in the midst of a faltering domestic economy at the time. An excerpt of the resolution reads:

BE IT RESOLVED AND MADE KNOWN THAT:

The State Council of the Turks and Caicos Islands desires to thank formally the Canadian People and their Government for the considerable help and advice received by these Islands from them in recent years. This State Council, recognising the urgent need for both long and short term solutions to our present constitutional, financial and economic problems, further resolves that it would welcome additional professional and technical advice from both governmental and non-governmental organisations so that we may benefit from your long and loyal membership of the British Commonwealth.

In particular, this State Council would welcome far greater official contact between our two governments and herewith cordially invite a Canadian Parliamentary Delegation to visit these Islands and advise us during these days of decision.

— State Council of the Turks and Caicos Islands

In 1974, a private members' bill was introduced in the federal Canadian Parliament to explore a formal association between Canada and the Turks and Caicos. The bill, entitled "An act respecting a proposed association between Canada and the Caribbean Turks and Caicos Islands", did not have the support of the government at the time, not uncommon for a bill from the backbenches, and was ultimately not brought to a vote. While the bill did not proceed in Parliament, it did bring the concept of Canadian political association back into the mainstream of Turks and Caicos Islander politics.

Following the independence of its neighbouring British possessions, the Turks and Caicos received their own territorial governor as well as responsible self-government. In 1976 after the first election in this new framework, the pro-independence People's Democratic Movement (PDM) won a majority of seats in the country's House of Assembly. After election, the PDM prepared the islands for autonomy from the United Kingdom, which included a successful petition for a constitution for the islands expanding islander rights and further enhancing self-government.

=== Height of political support (1980s) ===
The two predominant political parties on the islands, the pro-independence People's Democratic Movement (PDM) and the anti-independence Progressive National Party (PNP), agreed to independence by 1982. However, a territorial election in 1982 saw a return for the then governing Progressive National Party, which halted plans for independence. The PNP, still facing sluggish economic growth and high unemployment within the islands, instead pushed for domestic reforms and closer relations with its neighbours.

One of these proposals was to renew efforts to form some type of political unity with Canada. Between 1973 and 1987, members of the territory's legislature met with members of both houses of the Canadian Parliament to discuss the advantages the islands would receive by associating closely with Canada. On 10 March 1987, Liberal Senator and former Cabinet Minister Hazen Argue tabled a motion calling for both nations to explore "the desirability and advantages of the Turks and Caicos Islands becoming a part of Canada". This motion referenced the ongoing talks with members of both countries' legislatures. During debate in the Canadian Senate, Argue identified advantages that the Turks and Caicos legislature saw in association with Canada:

- Greater internal self-government owing to status as a territory, part of a province, or as a province in its own right;
- Utilisation of the Canadian dollar;
- Islanders would benefit from movement and work rights as Canadian citizens, compared to the restrictions imposed on them at the time as British Overseas citizens;
- Benefits from Canada's relationship with the United States;
- Several benefits stemming from economic integration, such as a reliable domestic tourist market;
- Domestic access to the Canadian educational system, government assistance programs, and judicial systems.

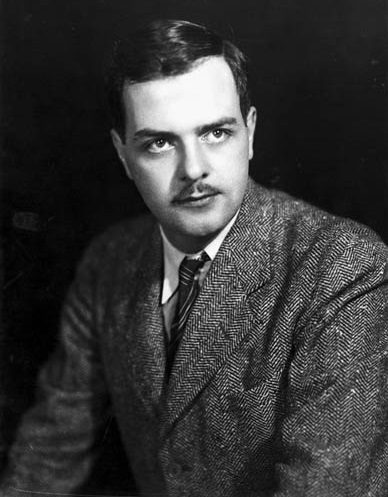
Hazen Argue, author of a motion in the Canadian Senate supporting annexation in 1987.

The motion also laid out concrete steps that the nations might need to take to move towards integration; the list has since been cited as the steps that both nations would need to take if the process were to be initiated in the future:

(1) adoption of a common currency;

(2) designation of Canada's Governor General as the King's representative for the islands (thus replacing the current Governor);

(3) a closer economic association between the two countries;

(4) any change in procedures to our mutual advantage, that would assist the entry of Canadians to the Islands, and of Islanders to Canada; and

(5) provision of efficient direct air service between the two countries.

— Hazen Argue, Senate Debates, 33rd Parliament, 2nd Session : Vol. 1

Association with Canada reached an all-time peak of support amongst islanders at this time, with around 90% of its citizens supporting it. Indeed, it seemed that having the backing of a prominent former Cabinet minister would at least propel the bill into higher media attention. However, commentators generally agree that the publicity of another prominent foreign affairs discussion, the Canada–United States Free Trade Agreement (which would later become the North American Free Trade Agreement (NAFTA)), distracted both politicians in Ottawa as well as Canadian media from focusing on seriously considering annexing the islands. After its introduction in the Foreign Affairs Committee of the Senate, Argue's bill did not proceed to the floor.

=== 1990s to present ===
The combination of NAFTA's domination in Canadian politics throughout the late 1980s and early 1990s, as well as growing rights for Turks and Caicos Islanders as a dependency of the United Kingdom, are seen as leading to a decline in interest in Canada's association with the islands. In 2002, the Parliament of the United Kingdom passed the British Overseas Territories Act 2002 which granted full British Overseas Territories citizenship (such as the Turks and Caicos Islands' local 'Belonger' status), on par with their counterparts in the United Kingdom. The act directly addressed a number of concerns of the islander government in their discussions with the Canadian government asking for closer association. The act removed barriers for islanders to immigrate and work in the UK, and only served to further lower discussion in mainstream politics of unification with Canada.

However, the suspension of the island's self-government between 2009 and 2012 over ministerial corruption has re-energized the debate over the islands' future as a British Overseas Territory. In particular, dissatisfaction with losing home rule by Britain has led some to favour independence or a change in sovereign patronage vis-a-vis Canada.

== Opposition ==
Opposition to political association exists in both Canada and the Turks and Caicos alike. Opponents of association cite issues ranging from cultural differences, political concerns over corruption, and foreign policy implications for Canada.

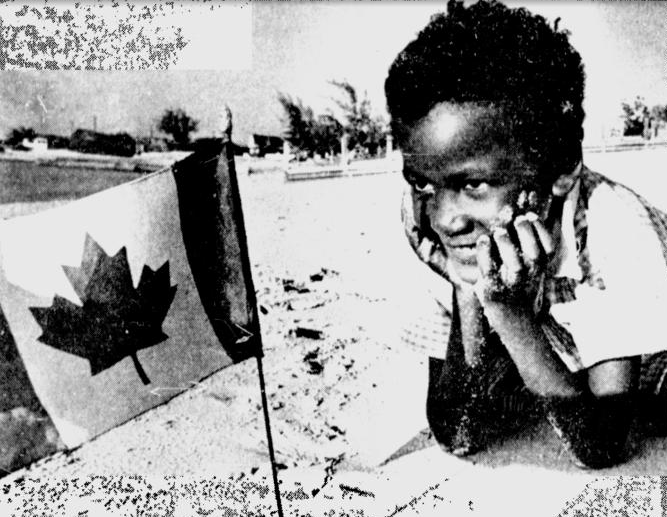
Turks and Caicos Islander with a Canadian Flag, 1974

After a 2009 report from a UK commission of inquiry, the British government suspended self-government for the islands over findings of significant corruption in the Turks and Caicos' government. The Premier of the islands, Michael Misick, resigned in the wake of the suspension and was viewed as a central component to dispensing political favours to other connected elites. Critics contend that issues such as those with self-government, the second time it has occurred in the history of the territory, would make the Turks and Caicos an unsuitable candidate for inclusion in Canada's strong democratic values.

Canada has maintained a foreign policy as a peacekeeping middle power, and its commitment to multiculturalism and multilateralism has led some to decry expansionist policies as inconsistent with these values. Supporters counter that association would not occur without the consent of the islands' population and thus would be in furtherance of, rather than detrimental to, Canada's values of multiculturalism.

== Proposed methods of political association ==
There are multiple proposals for political union, all with certain supporters and detractors, and many variations within each.

In every method, the consent of at least the federal Canadian Parliament and the governing authorities of the Turks and Caicos would be necessary for association. Thus, overwhelming public support in both countries would have to support political association for it to occur. The United Kingdom would be involved in these negotiations; however, the official position of the UK Government has been to support the self-determination of its overseas territories, and thus would not prevent the Turks and Caicos from becoming a part of Canada if the citizens of the islands supported that move. This position was reaffirmed by the British Foreign and Commonwealth Office with respect to the Turks and Caicos in 1987.

=== Establishment as a new province ===
The establishment of the islands as a new province in their own right would provide the maximum level of autonomy for the Turks and Caicos under all proposed methods of association by putting it legally on a par with the existing 10 provinces. Rufus Ewing, the Premier of the Turks and Caicos Islands, has said this method would be the most desirable form of association for the islanders.

However, becoming a province would also be the most politically challenging method, as it would require amending under the general procedure of the Canadian Constitution Act of 1982, requiring the support of the federal parliament and two-thirds of provincial legislatures that represent more than 50% of the Canadian population. It is improbable that this number could be achieved, as the addition of a new province has the potential to divide federal payments to existing provinces. It is likely that incorporation of the less affluent Turks and Caicos would result in the islands siphoning funds from equalization payments from other less wealthy provinces, reducing their chances of supporting this method.

=== Establishment as a territory ===
The incorporation of the Turks and Caicos Islands as a territory of Canada would be the simplest method of annexation from a legal and constitutional standpoint. The establishment of territories requires a simple act of the federal parliament, and does not require any action on the part of the provinces. A similar procedure was used in 1993 to establish Nunavut.

=== Incorporation into an existing province ===
Some proponents of political association have suggested that incorporation into an existing province would be the most feasible method of annexation. This method would skirt the normal process for amending the Canadian Constitution by taking advantage of the less rigorous formula under Section 43 of the Constitution Act, 1982. This prescribes that portions of the constitution affecting only one province can be amended with the consent of the federal Parliament and the legislature of that province. Thus, it is probable that political association could be achieved using this method with general public support throughout Canada in addition to support from one willing province, as well as public support in the Turks and Caicos.

This proposal has already been officially supported by one province, Nova Scotia, in April 2004 when its legislature adopted a resolution explicitly inviting the government of the Turks and Caicos to explore joining Canada as a part of that province. The full text of the resolution reads:

Whereas the Turks and Caicos is a Caribbean treasure consisting of 40 islands and a population of almost 19,000 people that is currently governed as a British territory; and

Whereas the Government of Turks and Caicos has expressed an interest in joining Canada; and

Whereas the Province of Nova Scotia has a long and proud history of conducting trade with the Caribbean;

Therefore be it resolved that the Government of Nova Scotia initiate discussions with the Turks and Caicos to become part of the Province of Nova Scotia and encourage the Government of Canada to welcome the Turks and Caicos as part of our country.

== Comparison ==
=== Politics and government ===
Both Canada and the Turks and Caicos Islands operate under a Westminster system of government, and share King Charles III as their head of state (in his capacity as King of Canada and King of the United Kingdom, respectively). While Canada is a sovereign, independent state that shares Charles III as its monarch in free association with the other Commonwealth realms, the Turks and Caicos Islands are an internally self-governing British overseas territory, in which the British monarch is represented by a resident Governor.

The foreign relations of the Turks and Caicos Islands are the responsibility of the United Kingdom, which is fulfilled through the Foreign, Commonwealth and Development Office. The FCDO is headed by the Foreign Secretary, a member of the Government of the United Kingdom. Despite the United Kingdom's oversight of the territory's foreign affairs, the Turks and Caicos Islands participate in the Caribbean Community as an associate member. The Caribbean Community is an intergovernmental organisation composed of 15 members and 5 associate members that promotes economic integration of the Caribbean.

Canada is a "full democracy" with a tradition of liberalism and strong rule of law. Canada has consistently ranked very highly on the Democracy Index; in 2019, it tied for 7th in the world for strength of democracy. The Turks and Caicos Islands have faced significant challenges in combating corruption and have twice lost their right to self-government since first achieving that status in 1976: once in 1986 and again in 2009; both times due to corruption of ministerial and public positions.

== See also ==
- Associated state
- Protectorate
- Canada–United Kingdom relations
- Crown colony
- Self-governing colony
- British West Indies Federation (1958-1962)
- List of proposed provinces and territories of Canada
- UK/West Indies Associated States (UK-WAIS), A defunct free association between the U.K. with several Caribbean isles following the Federation.
- Australian Indian Ocean Territories, A political affiliation arrangement between Australia and nearby islands
- Compact of Free Association - A political arrangement between the United States of America and several Pacific isles
