= Ouvrier Indépendant =

Ouvrier Indépendant was the label under which three candidates ran in Canadian federal elections between 1962 and 1965. They never won a seat in the House of Commons of Canada. Adélard Patry ran in the 1962 federal election.

Lionel Bécotte ran in the 1963 election. In the 1965 election, there were two candidates: Adélard Patry and Fernando-Avila Panneton.

== See also ==
- List of political parties in Canada
