= History of the New Democratic Party =

Canadian political party founded in 1961

This article covers the history of the New Democratic Party of Canada.

== 20th century ==
=== Origins, early history, and Tommy Douglas ===
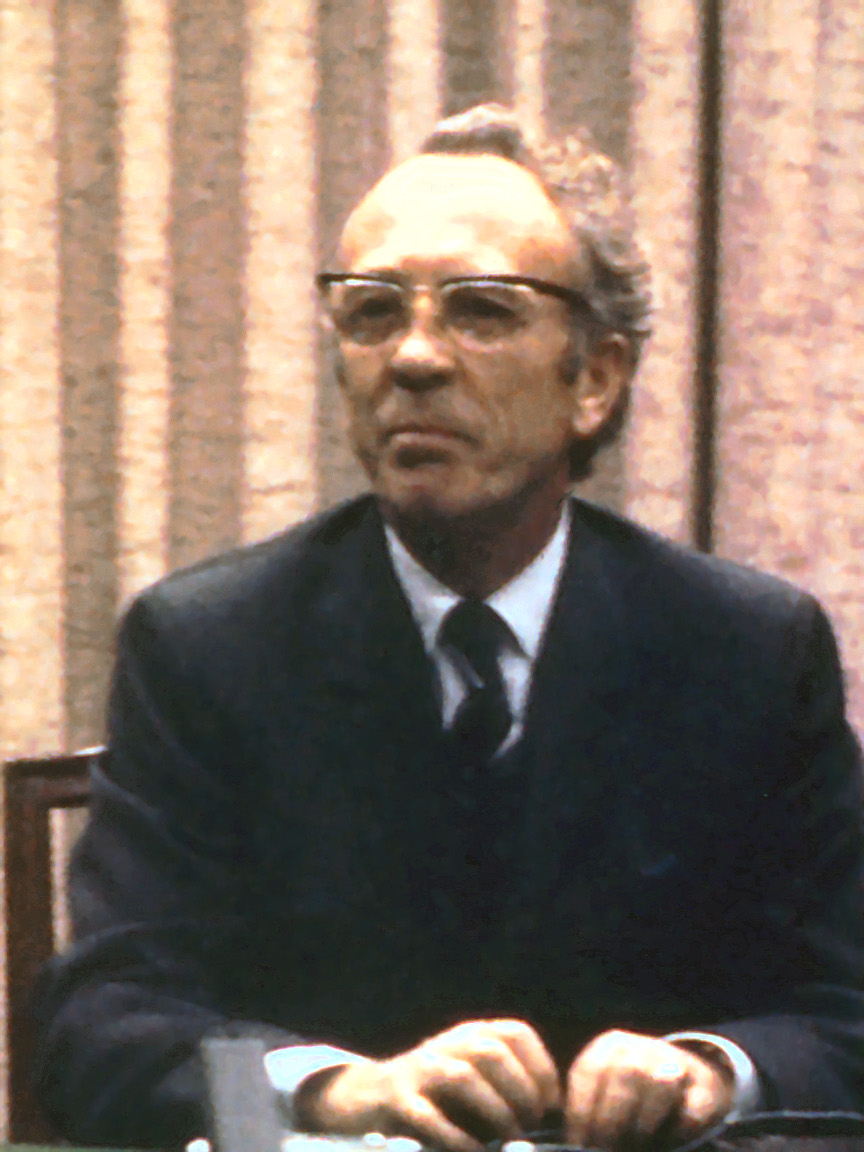
Tommy Douglas, Leader: 1961-1971

In 1956, after the birth of the Canadian Labour Congress (CLC) by a merger of two previous labour congresses, negotiations began between the CLC and the Co-operative Commonwealth Federation (CCF) to bring about an alliance between organized labour and the political left in Canada. In 1958 a joint CCF-CLC committee, the National Committee for the New Party (NCNP), was formed to create a "new" social-democratic political party, with ten members from each group. The NCNP spent the next three times laying down the foundations of the New Party. During this process, a large number of New Party Clubs were established to allow like-minded Canadians to join in its founding, and six representatives from New Party Clubs were added to the National Committee. In 1961, at the end of a five-day-long Founding Convention which established its principles, policies, and structures, the New Democratic Party was born and Tommy Douglas, the long-time CCF Premier of Saskatchewan, was elected its first leader. In 1960, before the NDP was founded, one candidate, Walter Pitman, won a by-election under the New Party banner. Supporters of the New Democratic Party are sometimes referred to as "Dippers".

The influence of organized labour on the party was reflected in the party's conventions, as affiliated unions sent delegates on a formula based on their number of members. Even after the party adopted a model of direct election by party membership, labour unions received a reserved 25% of the vote. This carve out was eliminated ahead of the 2012 New Democratic Party leadership election.

The party had one non-union affiliate, the Woodsworth-Irvine Socialist Fellowship, a carry-over from the old Alberta CCF, in existence up to 2007.

=== Leadership of David Lewis ===
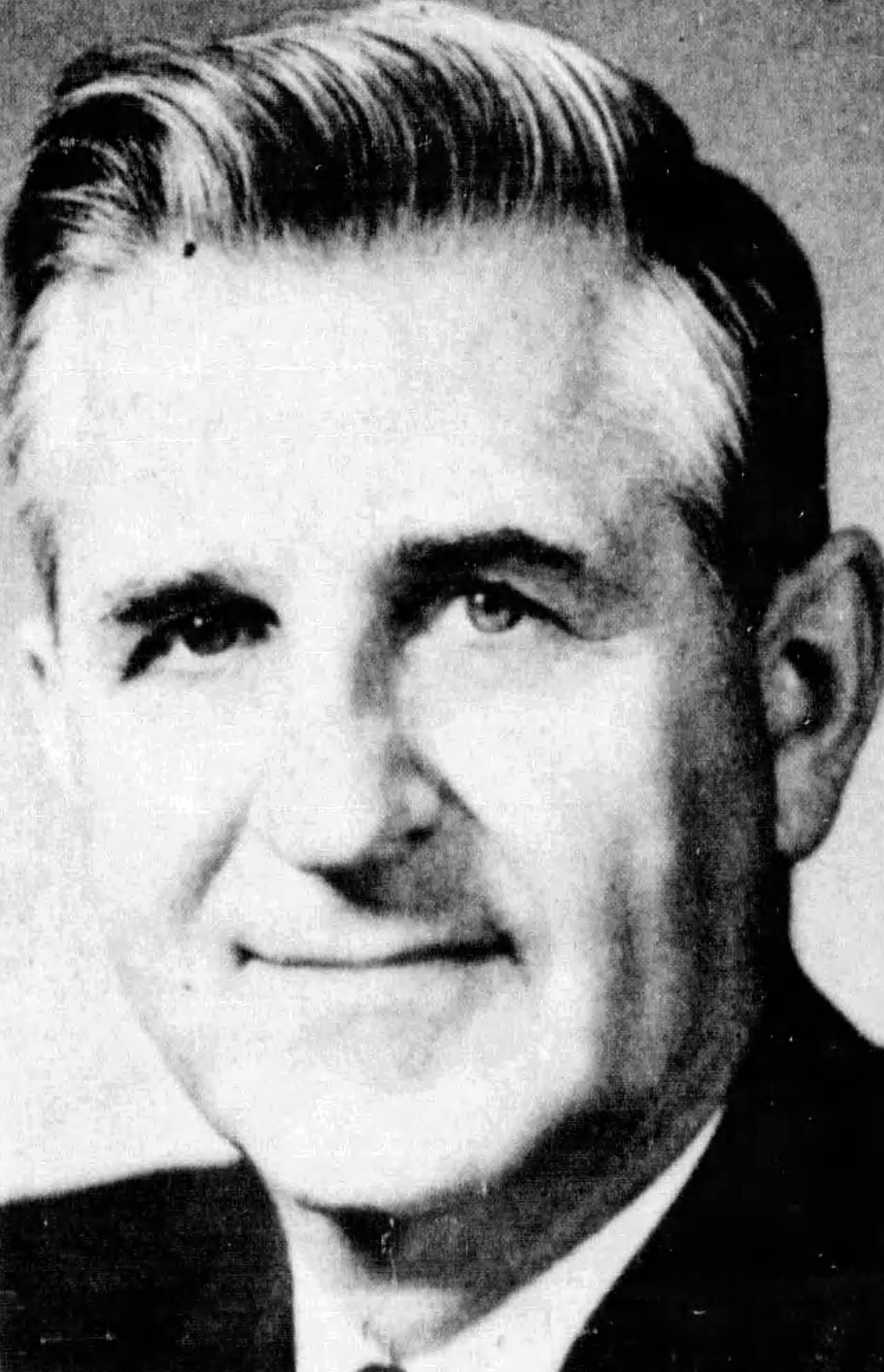
David Lewis

Under the leadership of David Lewis (1971–1975), the NDP supported the minority government formed by Pierre Trudeau's Liberals from 1972 to 1974, although the two parties never entered into a coalition. Together they succeeded in passing several socially progressive initiatives into law such as pension indexing and the creation of the crown corporation Petro-Canada.

In 1974, the NDP worked with the Progressive Conservatives to pass a motion of non-confidence, forcing an election. However, it backfired as Trudeau's Liberals regained a majority government, mostly at the expense of the NDP, which lost half its seats. Lewis lost his own riding and resigned as leader.

=== Leadership of Ed Broadbent ===
Party logo during the 1980s

Under Ed Broadbent (1975–1989), the NDP played a critical role during Joe Clark's minority government of 1979–1980, moving the non-confidence motion on John Crosbie's budget that brought down the Progressive Conservative (PC) government, and forced the 1980 election that brought the Liberal Party back to power.

The result in 1980 created two unexpected results for the party: The first was an offer by Trudeau to form a coalition government to allow for greater Western representation in Cabinet and a "united front" regarding the upcoming Quebec referendum. Broadbent, aware that the NDP would have no ability to hold the balance of power and thus no leverage in the government, declined out of fear the party would be subsumed.

The second was Trudeau's Canada Bill to patriate the Constitution of Canada unilaterally and to bring about what would become the Canadian Charter of Rights and Freedoms. Broadbent endorsed the initiative, which was directly opposed by the NDP government of Saskatchewan and many of the party's Western parties and members, creating severe internal tension. Broadbent would act as a moderating influence on Trudeau during the debates, and the eventual compromise that brought about the Constitution Act, 1982 was partially authored by Saskatchewan NDP Attorney General and future premier Roy Romanow.

In the 1984 election, which saw the Conservatives win the most seats in Canadian history, the NDP won 30 seats, only one behind the 31 it won in 1972. The governing Liberals were decimated, falling to 40 seats in what was at the time the worst defeat of a sitting at home at the federal level. The NDP fared far better than expected, considering the Tories won the biggest majority government in Canadian history. Third parties historically do not do well in landslide election contests. More importantly, they were only 10 seats behind the Liberals—the closest the party and its predecessors had ever gotten to the two major parties up to that point. It was also the best performance for a third party in almost 60 years. This led to some talk that Canada was headed for a UK-style Tory-Labour division, with the NDP pushing the Liberals into oblivion. Afterwards, Broadbent himself consistently out-polled Liberal leader John Turner and even Prime Minister Brian Mulroney.

On July 20, 1987, the NDP swept three by-elections in Newfoundland, Ontario, and the Yukon, picking up two formerly Conservative seats and holding one NDP seat. These by-elections brought Audrey McLaughlin to the House of Commons as the MP for Yukon.

The NDP elected a record 43 Members of Parliament (MPs) in the election of 1988. The Liberals, however, had reaped most of the benefits of opposing the Canada–United States Free Trade Agreement to emerge as the dominant alternative to the ruling government. The Conservatives' barrage of attacks on the Liberals, as well as vote-splitting between the NDP and Liberals, helped them win a second consecutive majority. In 1989, Broadbent stepped down after 20 years as federal leader of the NDP.

=== Decline ===
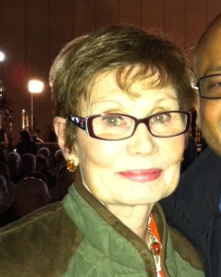
Audrey McLaughlin

At the party's leadership convention, former B.C. Premier Dave Barrett and Audrey McLaughlin were the main contenders for the leadership. During the campaign, Barrett argued that the party should be concerned with western alienation, rather than focusing its attention on Quebec. The Quebec wing of the NDP strongly opposed Barrett's candidacy, with Phil Edmonston, the party's main spokesman in Quebec, threatening to resign from the party if Barrett won. Barrett's campaign was also hurt when leadership rival Simon De Jong announcing his endorsement of McLaughlin before the vote, after having privately pledged to support Barrett. McLaughlin ran on a more traditional approach, and became the first woman to lead a major Federal political party in Canada, winning on the fourth ballot.

Although enjoying strong support among organized labour and rural voters in the Prairies, McLaughlin tried to expand their support into Quebec without much success. In 1973, the Quebec New Democratic Party adopted a sovereigntist platform and severed its ties with the federal NDP. Under McLaughlin, the party did manage to win an election in Quebec for the first time when Edmonston won a 1990 by-election. The party had briefly picked up its first Quebec MP in 1986, when Robert Toupin crossed the floor from the Tories after briefly sitting as an independent. However, he left the party in October 1987 after claiming Communists had infiltrated the party.

The NDP chose to align itself with the Conservatives and Liberals on the "no" side of the Charlottetown Accord referendum in 1992. Barrett reluctantly endorsed it to comply with party policy (he opposed the Meech Lake Accord in 1987), but later referred to the NDP's support for the Accord as a mistake. Edmonston, a Quebec nationalist, frequently clashed with his own party over this position on Canadian federalism, and did not run for re-election.

The NDP was routed in the 1993 election. It won only nine seats, three seats short of official party status in the House of Commons. Several factors contributed to this dramatic collapse just one election after winning a record number of seats and after being first in opinion polling at one point during the previous Parliament. One was the massive unpopularity of NDP provincial governments under Bob Rae in Ontario and Mike Harcourt in British Columbia. Not coincidentally, the NDP was routed in these provinces; it lost all 10 of its Ontario MPs and 17 of its 19 British Columbia MPs—more than half of its caucus. The Ontario NDP would be soundly defeated in 1995, while the British Columbia NDP recovered and won reelection in 1996.

The NDP was also indirectly hampered by the collapse of the Progressive Conservatives, who were cut down to only two seats. Exit polls showed that 17% to 27% of NDP supporters from 1988 voted Liberal in 1993. It was obvious by the beginning of October that Liberal leader Jean Chrétien would be the next prime minister. However, the memory of 1988's vote splitting combined with the tremendous antipathy toward the PCs caused NDP supporters to vote Liberal to ensure the Conservatives would be defeated. Many voters in the NDP's traditional Western heartland also switched to the right-wing Reform Party of Canada. Despite sharp ideological differences, Reform's populism struck a chord with many western NDP supporters. In Ontario, fear of the Reform Party and anger at Rae helped cause NDP supporters to vote Liberal. Barrett's warnings about Western alienation proved to be prophetic, as the rise of the Reform Party replaced the NDP as the protest voice west of Ontario.

== Into the 21st century ==
=== Recovery ===
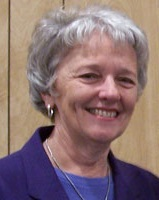
Alexa McDonough

The party recovered somewhat under new leader Alexa McDonough, electing 21 New Democrats in the 1997 election. The NDP made a breakthrough in Atlantic Canada, unseating Liberal ministers David Dingwall and Doug Young. The party was able to harness the discontent of Maritime voters, who were upset over cuts to employment insurance and other programs.

Afterwards, McDonough was widely perceived as trying to move the party toward the centre of the political spectrum, in the Third Way mode of Tony Blair. Union leaders were lukewarm in their support, often threatening to break away from the NDP, while Canadian Auto Workers head Buzz Hargrove called for her resignation. MPs Rick Laliberté and Angela Vautour crossed the floor to other parties during this term, reducing the NDP caucus to 19 seats.

In the November 2000 election, the NDP campaigned on the issue of Medicare but lost significant support. The governing Liberals ran an effective campaign on their economic record and managed to recapture some of the Atlantic ridings lost to the NDP in the 1997 election. The initial high electoral prospects of the Canadian Alliance under new leader Stockwell Day also hurt the NDP as many supporters strategically voted Liberal to keep the Alliance from winning. The NDP finished with 13 MPs — just barely over the threshold for official party status.

The party embarked on a renewal process starting in 2000. A general convention in Winnipeg in November 2001 made significant alterations to party structures, and reaffirmed its commitment to the left. The party also saw the rise of the New Politics Initiative during this time. In the May 2002 by-elections, Brian Masse won the riding of Windsor West in Windsor, Ontario, previously held for decades by a Liberal, former Deputy Prime Minister Herb Gray.

=== Rise under Jack Layton ===
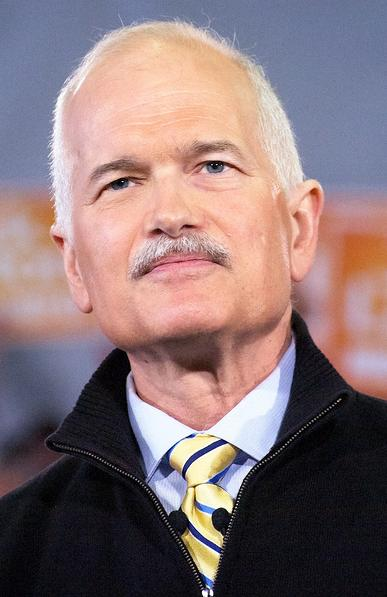
Jack Layton was the first leader of the NDP to become Leader of the Official Opposition.

McDonough announced her resignation as party leader for family reasons in June 2002, and was succeeded by Jack Layton. A Toronto city councillor and recent President of the Federation of Canadian Municipalities, Layton was elected at the party's leadership election in Toronto on January 5, 2003, defeating his nearest rival, longtime Winnipeg-area MP Bill Blaikie, on the first ballot with 53.5% of the vote.

Layton had run unsuccessfully for the Commons three times in Toronto-area ridings. In contrast to traditional but diminishing Canadian practice, where an MP for a safe seat stands down to allow a newly elected leader a chance to enter Parliament, Layton did not contest a seat in Parliament until the 2004 election. In the interim, he appointed Blaikie as deputy leader and made him parliamentary leader of the NDP.

==== 2004 election ====
The 2004 election produced mixed results for the NDP. It increased its total vote by more than a million votes; however, despite Layton's optimistic predictions of reaching 40 seats, the NDP only gained five seats in the election, for a total of 19. The party was disappointed to see its two Saskatchewan incumbents defeated by the Conservatives, both in close races, perhaps due to the unpopularity of the NDP provincial government. Those losses caused the federal NDP to be shut out in Saskatchewan for the first time since the 1965 election, despite obtaining 23% of the vote in the province.

Exit polls indicated that many NDP supporters voted Liberal to keep the new Conservative Party from winning. The Liberals had recruited several prominent NDP members, most notably former British Columbia premier Ujjal Dosanjh, to run as Liberals as part of a drive to convince NDP voters that a reunited Conservative Party could sneak up the middle in the event of a split in the centre-left vote.

The Liberals were re-elected, though this time as a minority government. Combined, the Liberals and NDP had 154 seats—one short of the total needed for the balance of power. As has been the case with Liberal minority governments in the past, the NDP were in a position to make gains on the party's priorities, such as fighting health care privatization, fulfilling Canada's obligation to the Kyoto Protocol, and electoral reform.

The party used Prime Minister Paul Martin's politically precarious position caused by the sponsorship scandal to force investment in multiple federal programs, agreeing not to help topple the government provided that some major concessions in the federal budget were ceded to. The governing Liberals agreed to support the changes in exchange for NDP support on confidence votes. On May 19, 2005, by Speaker Peter Milliken's tie-breaking vote, the House of Commons voted for second reading on major NDP amendments to the federal budget, preempting about $4.5 billion in corporate tax cuts and funding social, educational and environmental programs instead. Both NDP supporters and Conservative opponents of the measures branded it Canada's first "NDP budget". In late June, the amendments passed final reading and many political pundits concluded that the NDP had gained credibility and clout on the national scene.

==== 2006 election ====
On November 9, 2005, after the findings of the Gomery Inquiry were released, Layton notified the Liberal government that continued NDP support would require a ban on private health care. When the Liberals refused, Layton announced that he would introduce a motion on November 24 that would ask Martin to call a federal election in February to allow for several pieces of legislation to be passed. The Liberals turned down this offer. On November 28, 2005, Conservative leader Stephen Harper's motion of no confidence was seconded by Layton and it was passed by all three opposition parties, forcing an election. Columnist Andrew Coyne has suggested that the NDP was unlikely to receive much credit for continuing to further prop up the Liberals, so they ended their support for the Martin government.

During the election, the NDP focused their attacks on the Liberal party, in order to counter Liberal appeals for strategic voting. A key point in the campaign was when Judy Wasylycia-Leis had asked the Royal Canadian Mounted Police (RCMP) to launch a criminal investigation into the leaking of the income trust announcement. The criminal probe seriously damaged the Liberal campaign and prevented them from making their key policy announcements, as well as bringing Liberal corruption back into the spotlight. After the election, the RCMP announced the conclusion of the income trust investigation and laid a charge of 'Breach of Trust' against Serge Nadeau, an official in the Department of Finance, while Liberal Finance Minister Ralph Goodale was cleared of wrongdoing.

The NDP campaign strategy put them at odds with Canadian Auto Workers, which had supported an NDP-backed Liberal minority government and which was only backing NDP candidates that had a chance of winning. After the campaign, the Ontario NDP expelled CAW leader Buzz Hargrove from the party (which has a common membership both federally and provincially) for his support of the Liberals.

On January 23, the NDP won 29 seats, a significant increase of 10 seats from the 19 won in 2004. It was the fourth-best performance in party history, approaching the level of popular support enjoyed in the 1980s. The NDP kept all of the 18 seats it held at the dissolution of Parliament (Paul Dewar retained the riding of Ottawa Centre vacated by Broadbent). Bev Desjarlais, an NDP MP since 1997, unsuccessfully ran as an independent in her Churchill riding after losing the NDP nomination. While the party gained no seats in Atlantic Canada, Quebec, or the Prairie Provinces, it gained five seats in British Columbia, five more in Ontario and the Western Arctic riding of the Northwest Territories.

==== Conservative minority ====
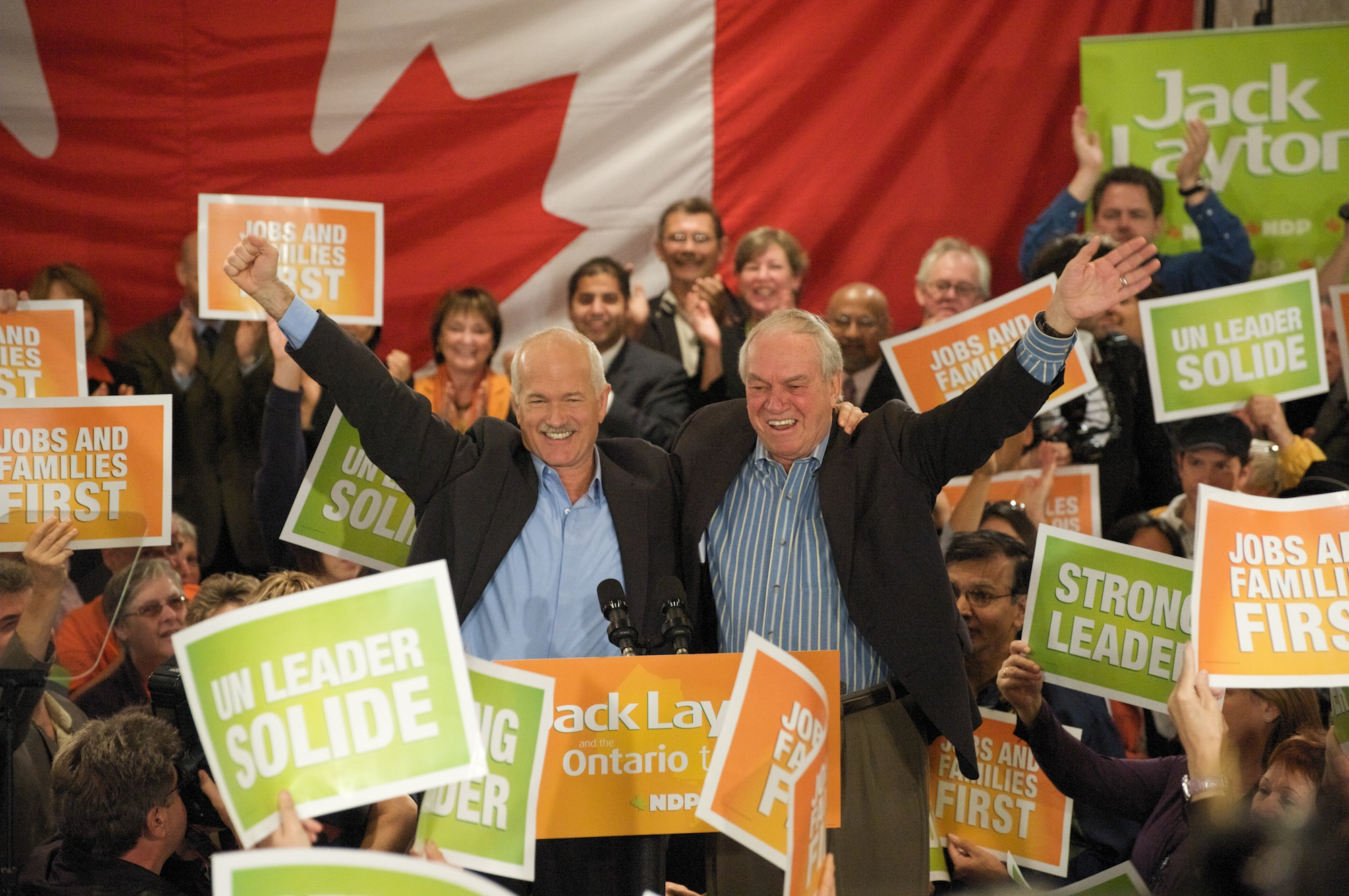
Ed Broadbent and Jack Layton at a 2008 election rally in Toronto

The Conservatives won a minority government in the 2006 election, and initially the NDP was the only party that would not be able to pass legislation with the Conservatives. However, following a series of floor crossings, the NDP also came to hold the balance of power.

The NDP voted against the government in all four confidence votes in the 39th parliament, the only party to do so. These were votes on the United States-Canada softwood lumber dispute, extending the mission to Afghanistan, the 2006 Canadian federal budget and 2007 federal budget. However, it worked with the Conservatives on other issues. After forcing the Conservatives to agree to certain revisions, the NDP helped pass the Federal Accountability Act. After the NDP fiercely criticized the initial Conservative attempt at a Clean Air Act, the Conservatives agreed to work with the NDP and other parties to revise the legislation. The NDP also supported the government in introducing regulations on income trusts, fearing that trends toward mass trust conversions by large corporations to avoid Canadian income taxes would cause the loss of billions of dollars in budget revenue to support health care, pensions and other federal programs. At the same time, the NDP was also wary of the threat of investor losses from income trusts' exaggerated performance expectations.

Following that election the NDP caucus rose to 30 members with the victory of NDP candidate Thomas Mulcair in a by-election in Outremont. This marked the second time ever (and first time in seventeen years) that the NDP won a riding in Quebec.

The party won 37 seats in the 2008 federal election, the best performance since the 1988 federal election total of 43. This included a breakthrough in the riding of Edmonton-Strathcona, only the second time the NDP had managed to win a seat in Alberta in the party's history.

=== Official Opposition ===
Results of the 2011 Canadian federal election

In the May 2011 election, the Jack Layton-led NDP suddenly experienced a surge in the polls, catapulting them from third-party status to the role of Official Opposition for the first time in history. The historic results began as a surge in poll numbers in Quebec for the NDP, putting the party in first place in that province and in second place nationally (just a few points behind the Tories). This NDP surge (dubbed the "Orange Crush" by the media, after the soft drink) was mirrored by a collapse in support for the Bloc Québécois in Quebec, and a collapse of support for the Liberals nationally as the progressive non-Conservative vote coalesced around the NDP. This resulted in the worst electoral result ever received by the federal Liberal party (being reduced to just 34 seats), the worst results for the Bloc Québécois (being reduced to 4 seats), and a shift and realignment of the Canadian political landscape as the NDP (previously a third party) was returned to Parliament with an unprecedented 103 seats (59 of which came from Quebec), allowing them replace the Liberal Party as Official Opposition and become the main centre-left non-Conservative party.

Jack Layton's performance on the French-language talk show Tout le monde en parle on April 3 was credited for improving his party's standing among francophone voters; it is the most widely watched TV show in Quebec. He was also perceived to have performed well in the televised French-language party leaders' debate on April 13.

The NDP held or won seats in every province but Saskatchewan and Prince Edward Island, and also held the Western Arctic riding coextensive with the Northwest Territories. It won 59 out of 75 seats in Quebec, dominating Montreal and sweeping Quebec City and the Outaouais. It got more than the 10% threshold required for reimbursement of campaign expenses in all but two ridings in the country, an unprecedented result for the party.

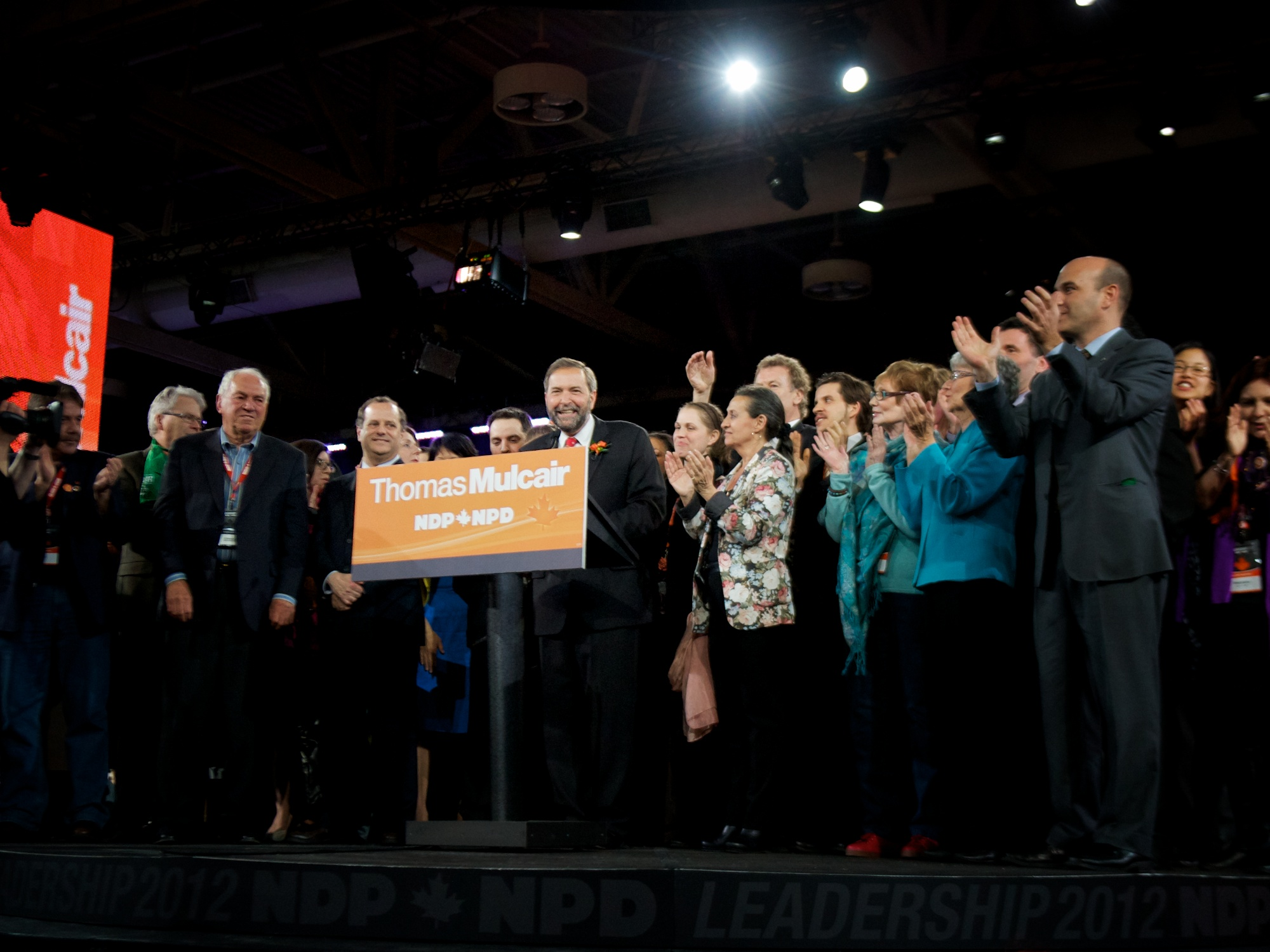
Thomas Mulcair gives his acceptance speech after winning the NDP Leadership on March 24, 2012

In July 2011, Layton announced that he was suffering from a new cancer and would take a leave of absence, projected to last until the resumption of Parliament in September. He would retain his position of NDP Leader and Leader of the Opposition. The party confirmed his suggestion of Hull—Aylmer MP Nycole Turmel to carry out the functions of party leader in his absence. Layton died from his cancer on August 22, 2011. In his final letter, Layton called for a leadership election to be held in early 2012 to choose his successor, which was held on March 24, 2012, and elected new leader Thomas Mulcair.

==== Leadership of Tom Mulcair ====
Mulcair declared his party's support for trade deals that included enforceable provisions on labour rights and environmental protection. Mulcair also strongly opposed plans for the creation of the Keystone XL and Northern Gateway pipelines, which included travelling to Washington D.C. to lobby against American approval of Keystone, and instead promoted the creation of a pipeline to carry western Canadian oil to be refined on Canada's east coast. During the Canadian Senate expenses scandal, the NDP reasserted its longstanding position that the Senate should be abolished. Mulcair promised to seek a mandate for Senate abolition during the 2015 Canadian federal election even though the Supreme Court had ruled in 2014 that abolition would require the consent of all ten provinces. During the party's national convention in April 2013, the NDP voted to remove "socialism" from the party constitution preamble, which was supported by Mulcair.

After the election of Thomas Mulcair, multiple polls put the NDP in first place nationally (and in Quebec), ahead of the governing Conservatives. In Quebec, the NDP climbed to over 50% support. Nevertheless, following the election of Justin Trudeau as leader of the Liberals in April 2013, the political fortunes of the NDP appeared to be on the decline, with the party falling back to its traditional third place in public opinion polls. The party would go on to lose a June 2014 by-election to the Liberals in the previously safe riding of Trinity-Spadina, which was made vacant following incumbent Olivia Chow's decision to run unsuccessfully in the 2014 Toronto mayoral election.

By May 2015, however, the NDP had managed to recover much of its lost ground in public opinion polling and was in a tight three-way race with both the Liberals and Conservatives. Commentators pegged several factors, including the party's opposing stance against the Conservative's Bill C-51 which the Liberals agreed to support and the surprise win for the Alberta NDP in the 2015 Alberta provincial election, as having helped revive the federal party's lagging fortunes. The party also enjoyed success in getting two of its bills through the House at this time, the first of which abolished the so-called "tampon tax" on feminine hygiene products, while the second banned the use of "pay-to-pay" fees charged by banks, although the latter was later blocked from the House floor by the Conservatives.

===== 2015 election =====
Results of the 2015 Canadian federal election showing support for New Democratic candidates by riding

Despite early campaign polls which showed an NDP lead, the party lost 59 seats on election night and fell back to third place in Parliament. By winning 44 seats Mulcair was able to secure the second best showing in the party's history, winning one more seat than Ed Broadbent managed in the 1988 election, but with a smaller share of the popular vote.

During the election campaign, Mulcair's stance on the niqab issue contributed to a decline in the party's support in Quebec. NDP seat gains in Saskatchewan and British Columbia were offset by numerical losses in almost every other region, while in Alberta and Manitoba the party simply held on to its existing seats without gaining or losing. The party was locked out of the Atlantic region and the Territories, and lost over half of its seats in Ontario including all of its seats in Toronto. In Quebec the NDP lost seats to all three of the other major parties, namely the Liberals, Conservatives, and Bloc Québécois, though it managed to place second in both vote share (25.4%) and seats (16) behind the Liberals, who formed a majority government.

Mulcair's leadership faced criticism following the election, particularly due to a moderate platform that the party was running on and Mulcair's promise to balance the federal budget while Liberal leader Justin Trudeau was promising to run a budget deficit in order to fund stimulus programs and higher social spending, a position which was perceived as allowing the Liberals to outflank the NDP on the left. At the NDP's party convention in April 2016, Mulcair was also criticized by Alberta delegates for what was seen as implicit support for the Leap Manifesto, a program which was seen as opposing Alberta's oil industry and thus a political threat to Rachel Notley's NDP government in Alberta. At the convention, 52% of delegates voted for a leadership review motion to hold a leadership election within 24 months, marking the first time in Canadian federal politics that a leader was defeated in a confidence vote. Mulcair was asked by his caucus to remain as leader until his replacement was selected.

=== Leadership of Jagmeet Singh ===
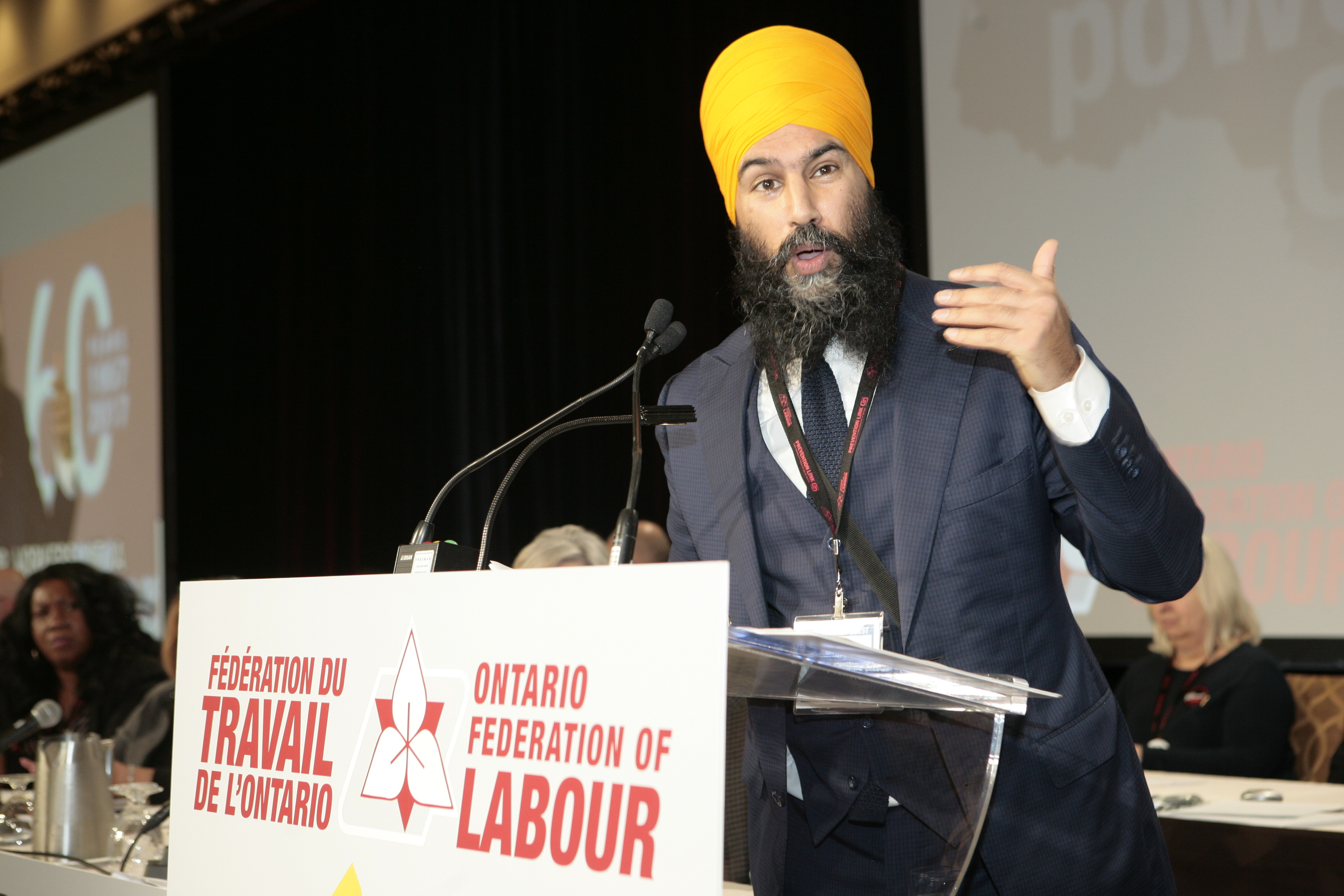
Jagmeet Singh

On October 1, 2017, Jagmeet Singh, the first person of a visible minority group to lead a major Canadian federal political party on a permanent basis, won the leadership vote to head the NDP on the first ballot; Singh defeated sitting MPs Charlie Angus, Nikki Ashton, and Guy Caron. During the campaign, the party's membership grew to 124,620. On August 8, 2018, Singh announced he would be running in a by-election to replace Kennedy Stewart as the Member of Parliament for Burnaby South. Stewart had resigned in order to make an ultimately successful bid for Mayor of Vancouver. Singh relocated to Burnaby for the election and won on February 25, 2019, with 38.9 per cent of the vote. In 2018, Singh expelled Saskatchewan NDP MP Erin Weir from caucus after a dispute over a third-party investigation that sustained some claims of harassment.

The NDP entered the campaign for the 2019 federal election with polling that suggested it was at risk of losing official party status, and even possibly being eclipsed by the Green Party, having already lost the riding of Nanaimo—Ladysmith to Green candidate Paul Manly in a by-election. This followed a by-election loss to the Liberals in Mulcair's vacated seat of Outremont, with most polls showing the NDP was vulnerable to a wipe out in Quebec. The NDP also saw low fundraising numbers during his tenure.

Singh was widely credited to have performed well in the English language debate on October 7, improving the poll numbers for both himself and his party. This followed positive coverage of his campaign, especially with regard to his handling of racial issues, when compared to the other party leaders.

Despite this late campaign momentum, the NDP would lose 15 seats for its worst result since 2004, winning in only 24 ridings. Deputy leader and Quebec lieutenant Alexandre Boulerice was the only NDP incumbent to retain his seat in Quebec, while fellow deputy leader Sheri Benson lost her riding of Saskatoon West to the Conservatives as part of their wider sweep of Saskatchewan. The NDP was able to retain its seat of Edmonton Strathcona with new candidate Heather McPherson, the only riding in Alberta and one of the few in the Canadian Prairies not to go Conservative. The party remained shut out of Toronto, and lost two of its incumbents in the rest of Ontario, while making a few single digit gains in Manitoba, Newfoundland, and Nunavut. In British Columbia the NDP lost three seats but were largely able hold onto their support in the province, preventing any further gains for the Greens on Vancouver Island. It was suggested that Singh's Sikhism may have been negatively received by Quebec voters in the context of the Quebec ban on religious symbols.

Following the election, the NDP held the balance of power as the Liberals won a minority government, although it fell back to fourth place behind the resurgent Bloc Québécois. During the COVID-19 pandemic the NDP used its leverage to lobby the Liberals to be more generous in their financial aid to Canadians, including making an extension of the CERB program a key demand in order to provide confidence to the government in the autumn of 2020.

On June 17, 2020, Singh was ordered to withdraw from the House of Commons for the rest of the day after refusing to apologize after calling a Bloc Québécois MP "racist" after the NDP motion on RCMP discrimination failed to receive unanimous consent from the House of Commons.

In the snap 2021 federal election the NDP made minor gains in both vote share and seat count, winning in 25 ridings. The party won a second seat in Alberta for the first time ever by electing Blake Desjarlais in Edmonton Griesbach and picked up two more seats in British Columbia. This included retaking Nanaimo—Ladysmith from the Greens in a tight three-way race, as well as flipping Port Moody—Coquitlam away from the Conservatives. These gains were offset by losses to the Liberals in St. John's East and Hamilton Mountain, both constituencies where the incumbent NDP candidate did not stand for re-election. Overall, the election resulted in no change to the balance of the House of Commons.

In September 2024, the NDP faced two competitive by-elections in Elmwood—Transcona in Manitoba and LaSalle—Émard—Verdun in Quebec. The NDP successfully defended the Elmwood—Transcona seat, with Leila Dance elected as MP with a much reduced margin. This was the NDP's first by-election victory in 5 years. However, the party finished a close third in LaSalle—Émard—Verdun, behind the Liberals and the Bloc Québécois.

During the final days of Singh's leadership, on May 3, 2025, the Alberta NDP voted to end automatic joint membership with the federal NDP, giving provincial members the option to opt out of federal membership. The move had been proposed by provincial leader Naheed Nenshi during his 2024 leadership campaign.

==== Confidence and supply agreement ====
On March 22, 2022, the NDP struck a confidence-and-supply agreement with the governing Liberal Party of Canada over certain priorities: the government would “by the end of 2023” implement pharmacare and a "dental care program for low-income Canadians" would be a government priority to be enacted by 2025. The pact was influenced when the Freedom Convoy caused Trudeau to invoke and revoke the Emergencies Act over the vaccine mandate policy then in effect and also by the 2022 Russian invasion of Ukraine. Among the policies included in the deal were the establishment of a national dental care program for low income Canadians, progress towards a national pharmacare program, labour reforms for federally regulated workers, and new taxes on financial institutions.

In early 2024, the two parties reached an impasse over pharmacare, putting the deal in jeopardy. The agreement called for the development of a Canada Pharmacare Act by the end of 2023, setting out a framework for the system, however the NDP had agreed to extend the deadline to March 1 of the following year as negotiations became fraught. Major points of contention included the NDP's demand that the system be single-payer, as well as preliminary coverage for certain drugs prior to the implementation of the full system. On February 23, the parties announced they had reached an agreement, salvaging the deal. The agreement would provide coverage for diabetes and contraceptive drugs ahead of the full program's launch. The NDP ended their confidence and supply agreement with the Liberal Party in September 2024; the deal had run from March 2022 but was pulled 9 months early.

==== 2025 election and collapse ====
Following the appointment of Mark Carney as prime minister, the NDP suffered poor polling. At the 2025 federal election, the NDP has suffered its worst seat result in its history, losing 17 of their 24 seats to both Liberal and Conservative candidates, and lost official party status in the House of Commons. Singh lost his own riding of Burnaby Central, and announced that he would resign as party leader. He was replaced by Vancouver Kingsway MP Don Davies on an interim basis until a new party leader was elected. On September 2, 2025, the leadership election campaign period began. The leadership candidates were: Heather McPherson, Tanille Johnston, Rob Ashton, Avi Lewis, and Tony McQuail. In March 2026, the party reported that its membership had risen to approximately 100,000 before the vote. After MP Lori Idlout crossed the floor to the Liberals, the party fell to a new low of six seats.

=== Leadership of Avi Lewis ===
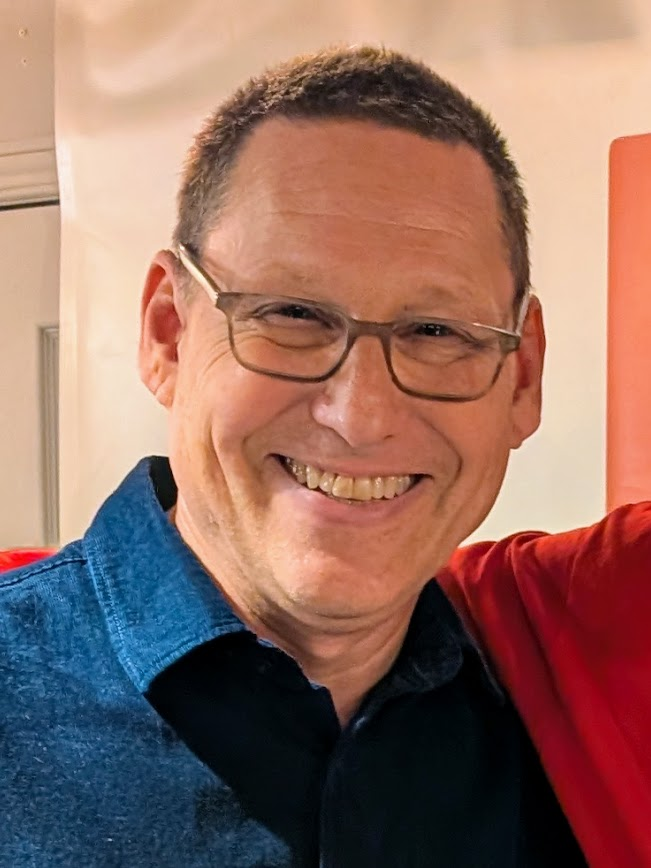
Avi Lewis

On March 29, 2026, Lewis, the grandson of former NDP leader David Lewis and son of former Ontario NDP leader Stephen Lewis, won the NDP leadership election on the first ballot with 56% of the vote. He is the first NDP leader to have never previously held elected office. At the time of his victory, Alberta NDP leader Naheed Nenshi and Saskatchewan NDP leader Carla Beck criticized the federal party's oil and gas policy under Lewis.
