= 1961 New Democratic Party leadership election =

Party election in Canada

- July 31 – August 4, 1961
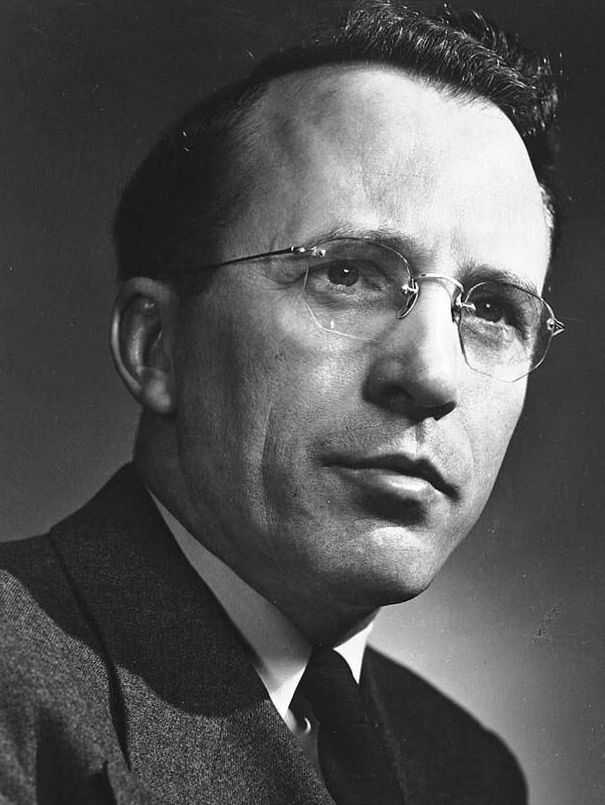

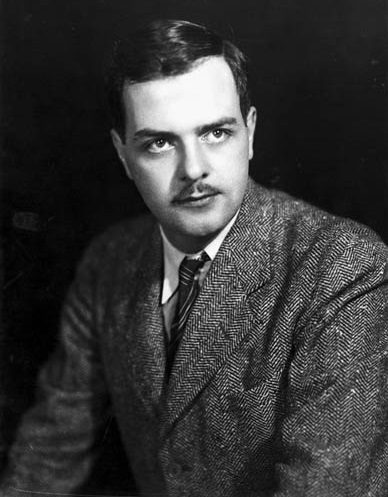
Candidate	Tommy Douglas	Hazen Argue
Delegate count	1,391	380
Percentage	78.5%	21.5%
Leader before election
Hazen Argue
CCF
Elected leader
Tommy Douglas
NDP

1961 New Democratic Party leadership election
- Date: July 31 – August 4, 1961
- Convention: Ottawa, Ontario
- Resigning leader: position created
- Won by: Tommy Douglas
- Ballots: 1
- Candidates: 2

The New Democratic Party's founding convention was held in Ottawa from July 31 to August 4, 1961. This convention formally closed down the Co-operative Commonwealth Federation (CCF) party and the New Party clubs, and merged them with the Canadian Labour Congress (CLC) to form the NDP. It is also known for the divisive leadership vote in which Saskatchewan Premier Tommy Douglas was elected over national CCF leader Hazen Argue. Over 2000 delegates attended the five-day convention held at the Ottawa Coliseum.

== CCF leadership succession crisis ==
By 1960, progress was being made in creating a new party from the old CCF, and the trade union movement as represented by the CLC. There were still leadership issues left unresolved in the CCF in the summer of 1960, and the party's president, David Lewis was forced to try to keep the federal House of Commons leader from causing an open leadership crisis. Since M. J. Coldwell, the CCF's national leader, lost his seat in the House of Commons, he constantly was thinking of resigning his post, but was asked by the party, many times, to stay on as national leader. With Coldwell's defeat, the CCF caucus chose Hazen Argue as the new House leader. During the lead-up to the 1960 CCF convention, Argue was pressing for Coldwell to step down. This leadership challenge would mean that plans for an orderly transition to the New Party would be in jeopardy, something that the CLC's and CCF's organizers, headed by Lewis, did not want. They wanted as their leader Saskatchewan premier Tommy Douglas, the most successful social democratic leader in Canada. To prevent their plans from being derailed, Lewis had to try to find a way to persuade Argue not to force a vote on the question of the party's leadership at the convention: Lewis was unsuccessful. There was a split between the parliamentary caucus and the party's executive that made it to the convention floor. Coldwell quit and Argue became the last National Leader of the CCF.

In the mid-1970s, David Lewis reflected on this incident and he realized that he did not handle the leadership transition well:

I, as president of the CCF, was very much in the wrong in trying to get a unanimous vote for Tommy. It arose out of a tradition we had had – no one opposed Woodsworth, no one had opposed Coldwell. They were chosen. I met with Hazen and tried to dissuade him from being a candidate. It was wrong. This attitude produced bitterness around the Hazen–Douglas contest.

== Naming the party ==
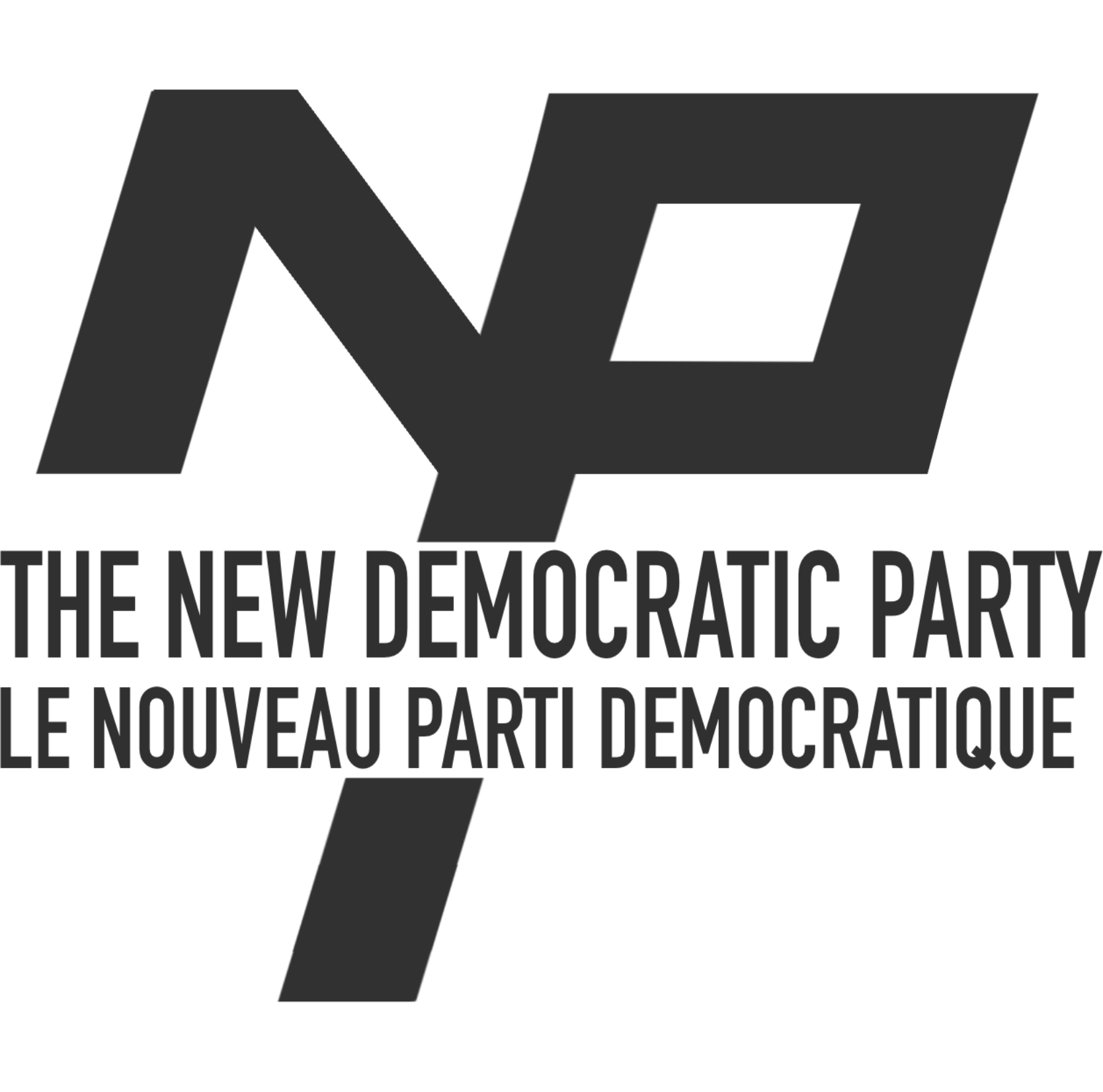
The logo of the New Democratic Party during its founding in 1961.

In July and August 1961, the CCF became the New Democratic Party (NDP), after a long process of deciding what to name the party. The party used a preferential ballot system to make the decision from four choices: New Party, New Democratic Party, Social Democratic Party, Canadian Democratic Party. In the end, the name New Democratic Party won on Thursday evening, 3 August, narrowly beating out New Party 784 to 743 votes. A day earlier, the party decided on green and gold as party colours, and that the logo should include the Peace Tower.

== Leadership vote ==
There were only two candidates, Saskatchewan premier T. C. Douglas, and National CCF leader Hazen Argue. Their nomination speeches were covered live on coast-to-coast television, something that did not happen before with the CCF. On Thursday evening, 3 August, the newly named party elected Douglas as its leader by a convincing 1,391 to 380 victory over Argue. Six months later, Argue quit the party and crossed the floor to join the Liberal Party.

== Federal council elections ==
On the last day of the convention, Friday, 4 August, the convention voted for 15 members to serve on the 82-seat federal council, the other 67 positions were filled by provincial or affiliate sections. There was some controversy that a slate was proposed, and distributed by union members and CCF establishment types, that did not include Hazen Argue. The convention's chairman, University of Toronto professor George Grube, was the leading candidate on the slate, and he did win the most votes. Twelve of the slate's 15 candidates won, but Hazen Argue was not able to break the slate and he was defeated. The delegates elected McGill University professor, and former CCF activist, Michael Oliver as the party's first president. The co-president was Montreal labour activist Gerard Picard. David Lewis, as the former president of the CCF, turned-down both positions, and accepted being a vice-president. Eamon Park, a union executive member with the United Steelworkers of America (USWA), was elected as the party's first treasurer. In recognition for his years of service as the National CCF's leader, M. J. Coldwell was unanimously voted in as the NDP's honorary chairman, a ceremonial post with no real power.
