= 1962 Canadian federal election =

- June 18, 1962

265 seats in the House of Commons 133 seats needed for a majority
- Turnout: 79.0% (▼0.4 pp)
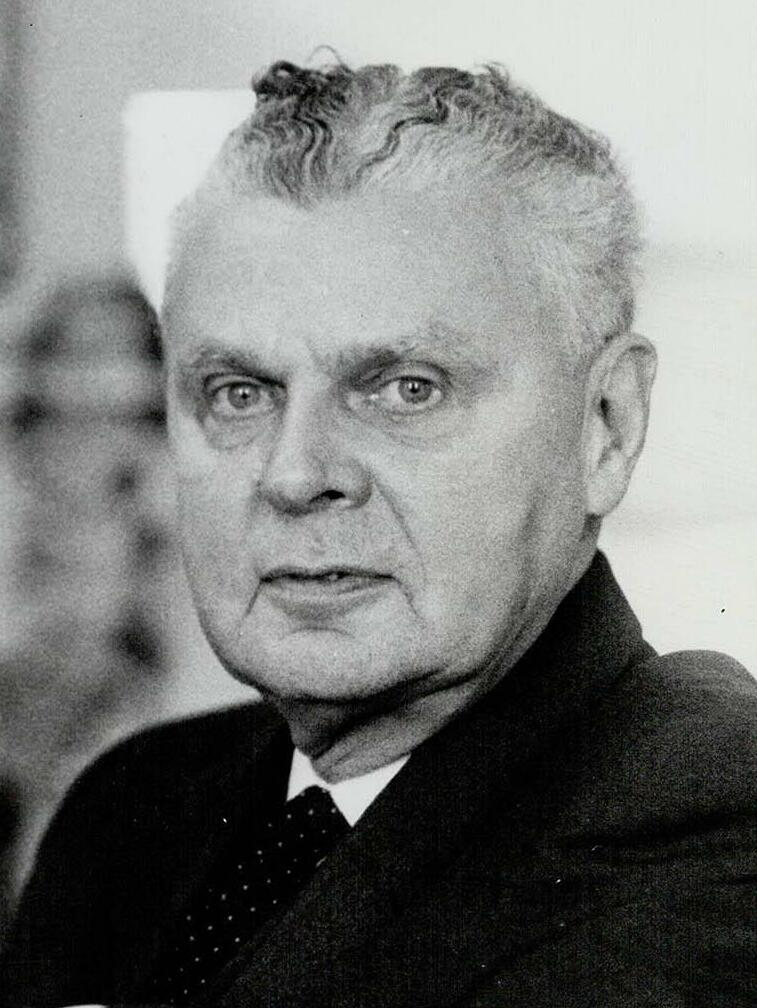

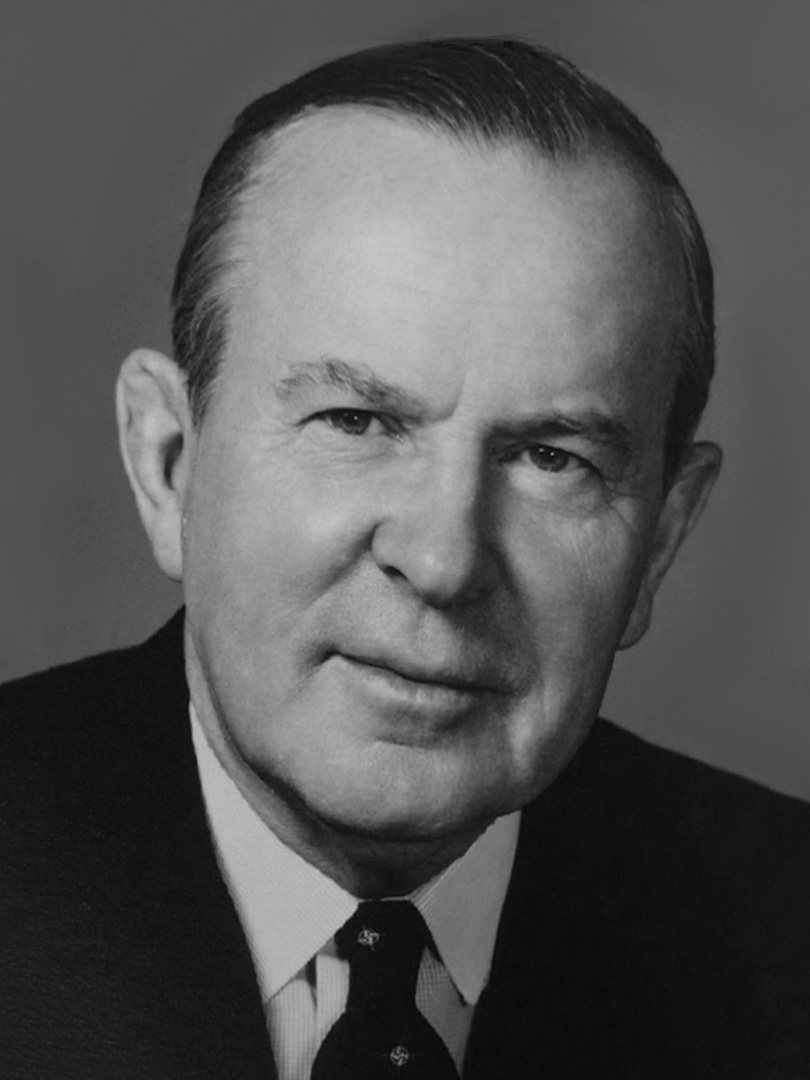

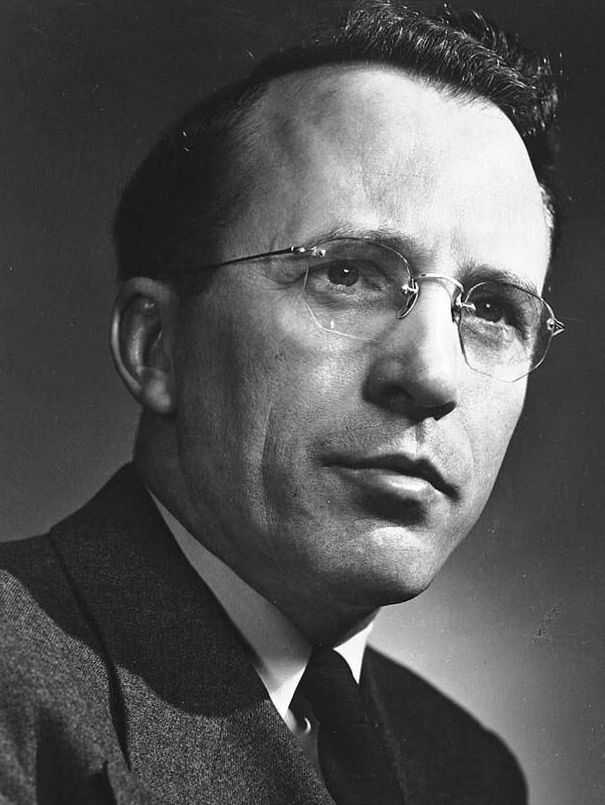
	First party	Second party
Leader	John Diefenbaker	Lester B. Pearson
Party	Progressive Conservative	Liberal
Leader since	December 14, 1956	January 16, 1958
Leader's seat	Prince Albert	Algoma East
Last election	208 seats, 53.66%	48 seats, 33.40%
Seats before	205	50
Seats won	116	99
Seat change	▼89	▲49
Popular vote	2,865,542	2,846,589
Percentage	37.22%	36.97%
Swing	▼16.35 pp	▲3.57 pp
	Third party	Fourth party
	SC
Leader	Robert N. Thompson	Tommy Douglas
Party	Social Credit	New Democratic
Leader since	July 7, 1961	August 3, 1961
Leader's seat	Red Deer	Ran in Regina City (lost)
Last election	0 seats, 2.59%	8 seats, 9.51% (Note: compared to CCF results in 1958)
Seats before	0	9
Seats won	30	19
Seat change	▲30	▲10
Popular vote	894,931	1,044,754
Percentage	11.62%	13.57%
Swing	▲9.02 pp	▲4.06 pp

- The Canadian parliament after the 1962 election
Prime Minister before election
John Diefenbaker
Progressive Conservative
Prime Minister after election
John Diefenbaker
Progressive Conservative

The 1962 Canadian federal election was held on June 18, 1962, to elect members of the House of Commons of Canada of the 25th Parliament of Canada. The governing Progressive Conservative (PC) Party won a plurality of seats in this election, and its majority government was reduced to a minority government.

When the writs were issued, PC Prime Minister John Diefenbaker had governed for four years with a 151-seat majority in the House. This election diminished the PCs to a tenuous minority government, winning 92 fewer seats than in the previous election, and losing 89 seats from its dissolution total. The PCs also only won the popular vote by 0.25%, the narrowest popular vote margin between the top two parties in Canadian federal election history. This came directly after the PCs won the largest majority government in Canadian federal election history, and the popular vote by the fourth-largest margin, in 1958. Many factors played a role in this dramatic shift, including economic difficulties such as high unemployment and a slumping Canadian dollar, as well as unpopular decisions such as the cancellation of the Avro Arrow.

Despite the Diefenbaker government's difficulties, the Liberal Party, led by Lester B. Pearson, was unable to make up enough ground in the election to defeat the government. This was also the first general election where the former Co-operative Commonwealth Federation contested under their new name, the New Democratic Party, upon affiliating with the Canadian Labour Congress. For the Social Credit Party, routed from the Commons just four years earlier, this election proved a high-water mark - though its share of the popular vote increased slightly in 1963, a split shortly thereafter marked the beginning of a steep decline in Western Canada, with Social Credit losing its last non-Quebec MPs in the 1965 election.

This was the first election in which all adult Indigenous peoples in Canada had the right to vote after the passage of a repeal of certain sections of the Canada Elections Act on March 31, 1960. First Nations and Status "Indians", which included Inuit, had been ineligible to vote under the Indian Act; they were considered "wards of the Crown" and excluded from full Canadian citizenship. They could not vote unless they gave up their treaty status through enfranchisement. On paper, Métis people have held the right to vote since before confederation and were not included in the Indian Act.

For the first time ever, the entire landmass of Canada was covered by federal electoral districts as the former Mackenzie River riding was expanded to cover the entire Northwest Territories, and renamed eponymously.

== Overview ==
During its term of office, the Diefenbaker government had introduced reforms to social programs, a Canadian Bill of Rights, and other changes. The Tories tried to defend the decline in the Canadian dollar by pointing out the benefits to the tourism industry, exports, manufacturing and farming, and employment. They denied that the devaluation affected the price of bread, beef, gasoline and fruit and vegetables, saying that these prices were either set in Canada or were influenced by other factors.

The Liberals campaigned under the slogan, "Take a stand for tomorrow," and attempted to portray the Diefenbaker government as "feeble," with a divided cabinet. The Liberals criticized the PCs for their "reckless mismanagement of finances," the slowdown in the Canadian economy, a lack of confidence in government policies, job losses, and a lower standard of living than in 1956. The Liberals also argued that the steep devaluation in the Canadian dollar was increasing the cost of living for Canadians.

The 1962 election was the first contested by the social democratic New Democratic Party, which had been formed from an alliance between the old Co-operative Commonwealth Federation (CCF) and the Canadian Labour Congress. The party chose longtime Premier of Saskatchewan Tommy Douglas as its first leader. The new party recovered ground lost by the CCF in the 1958 federal election, when it was nearly wiped out. It won almost 50% more votes than the CCF had ever managed, but it failed to achieve the major breakthrough that had been hoped for when the party was created.

The NDP was shut out in Saskatchewan, its political base, where Douglas failed to win his own seat. Douglas's campaign was hurt by chaos in Saskatchewan brought about by the introduction of Medicare and a resulting strike by the province's doctors. Douglas was forced to enter the House of Commons through a by-election in British Columbia. Despite the initial problems, Medicare proved popular, spread throughout the country, and is considered the NDP's (and Douglas') major contribution to the Canadian social fabric.

Social Credit returned to the House of Commons after being shut out in the 1958 election. While leader Robert N. Thompson and three other Socreds were elected in the party's traditional base in western Canada, the party's real success came in Quebec. Réal Caouette led the party's Quebec wing to victory in 26 ridings. Indeed, their win of 30 seats overall represented the party's greatest federal showing ever. They would never again equal, let alone surpass, that number—though the party gained its highest share of the vote in the 1963 election (1962 being its second-highest by a very close margin), it had a net loss of six seats.

The Socreds' success in Quebec was the result of several factors. Diefenbaker's poor French impaired the Tories' ability to communicate their message to francophone voters. In 1958, the PCs had successfully compensated for that handicap by using the powerful electoral machine of the Union Nationale government under Maurice Duplessis. By 1962, Duplessis was dead and the Union Nationale had been toppled, replaced by a Liberal government led by Jean Lesage, a former cabinet minister under Louis St. Laurent. Nevertheless, many francophone Quebecers remained hostile to the Liberals, and others had not yet warmed to the anglophone Pearson. Additionally, the controversy surrounding the new Liberal provincial government's radical agenda of the Quiet Revolution badly hurt the Liberal brand in rural Quebec. Nevertheless, while the Liberals actually lost significant vote share in Quebec (they scored more than six percentage points less compared to 1958), the split in the centre-right vote meant they still managed a plurality there both in popular vote and seats. The Liberals actually gained ten seats in the province, despite the decline in vote share.

In the end, despite their large losses the Tories' major saving grace was that the Liberals were all but invisible in the west, winning only seven seats west of Ontario. This election thereby began a pattern of the Tories dominating the provinces west of Ontario by large margins (with only occasional breakthroughs by the Liberals and NDP), forcing the Liberals to rely on Ontario, Quebec and the Atlantic Provinces to garner a majority. That pattern would continue until the Tories' demise as a party of government three decades later. The Tories remained in power with the tacit support of the Socreds, as the two parties held enough seats between them to command a parliamentary majority. However, Diefenbaker declined to negotiate a more formal alliance between the two parties, which would ultimately prove costly and helped lead to the fall of his government the following year.

== National results ==

Voter turn-out was 79.0%.

Party	Party leader	# of candidates	Seats			Popular vote		
Party	Party leader	# of candidates	1958	Elected	% Change	#	%	pp Change
Progressive Conservative	John Diefenbaker	265	208	116	-44.2%	2,865,542	37.22%	-16.35
Liberal	Lester B. Pearson	263	48	99	+106.3%	2,846,589	36.97%	+3.57
Social Credit	R.N. Thompson	231	-	30		894,931	11.62%	+9.03
New Democratic Party^{1}	Tommy Douglas	218	8	19	+137.5%	1,044,754	13.57%	+4.06
Liberal-Labour		1	1	1	-	15,412	0.20%	+0.04
Independent Liberal		7	-	-	-	10,406	0.14%	-0.03
Independent		12	-	-	-	9,032	0.10%	-0.03
Communist^{2}	Leslie Morris	12	-	-	-	6,360	0.08%	-0.05
Unknown		3	*	-	*	1,385	-	*
Independent PC		4	*	-	*	2,713	0.04%	*
Candidat libéral des electeurs		1	*	-	*	1,836	0.02%	*
Capital familial	H-G Grenier	1		-		393	0.01%	-0.01
Co-operative Builders		1	*	-	*	261	x	*
All Canadian		1	*	-	*	189	x	*
Ouvrier Indépendant		1	*	-	*	152	x	*
Total		1,016	265	265	-	7,699,901	100%	
Sources: Canada Open Government (Note: Results include the general election held June 18, 1962, as well as results from the election in the riding of Stormont on July 16, 1962, delayed due to the death of the Liberal candidate.)

Notes:

* Party did not nominate candidates in previous election.

x - less than 0.005% of the popular vote.

^{1} compared to Co-operative Commonwealth Federation results from previous election.

^{2} compared to Labor-Progressive Party results from previous election.

== Vote and seat summaries ==
Ternary plots - shift of electoral support (1958-1962)
1958

1962
Electoral districts identified by colours of winning parties

Popular vote
PC	37.22%
Liberal	36.97%
NDP	13.57%
Social Credit	11.60%
Others	0.64%

Seat totals
PC	43.77%
Liberal	37.35%
Social Credit	11.32%
NDP	7.16%
Others	0.40%

== Results by province ==
Party name		BC	AB	SK	MB	ON	QC	NB	NS	PE	NL	NW	YK	Total
Progressive Conservative	Seats:	6	15	16	11	35	14	4	9	4	1	-	1	116
Progressive Conservative	Popular Vote:	27.3	42.8	50.4	41.6	39.2	29.6	46.5	47.3	51.3	36.0	42.3	54.9	37.2
Liberal	Seats:	4	-	1	1	43	35	6	2	-	6	1	-	99
Liberal	Vote:	27.3	19.4	22.8	31.3	41.0	39.2	44.4	42.4	43.3	59.0	45.0	46.2	37.0
Social Credit	Seats:	2	2	-	-	-	26	-	-	-	-			30
Social Credit	Vote:	14.2	29.2	4.6	6.8	1.8	26.0	3.6	0.8	0.2	0.1			11.6
New Democrats	Seats:	10	-	-	2	6	-	-	1	-	-			19
New Democrats	Vote:	30.9	8.4	22.1	19.7	17.2	4.4	5.3	9.4	5.2	4.9			13.6
Liberal-Labour	Seats:					1								1
Liberal-Labour	Vote:					0.6								0.2
Total Seats		22	17	17	14	85	75	10	12	4	7	1	1	265
Parties that won no seats:
Independent Liberal	Vote:		0.1				0.5	0.2						0.1
Independent	Vote:	xx	0.1		0.3	0.1	0.2					11.41		0.1
Communist	Vote:	0.2		0.1	0.6	0.1	xx							0.1
Unknown	Vote:					0.1	xx		0.1					xx
Independent PC	Vote:						0.1							xx
Candidat libéral des electeurs	Vote:						0.1							xx
Capitale familiale	Vote:						xx							xx
Co-operative Builders	Vote:					xx								xx
All Canadian	Vote:		xx											xx
Ouvrier Indépendant	Vote:						xx							xx

xx - less than 0.05% of the popular vote

== See also ==
- List of Canadian federal general elections
- List of political parties in Canada
- 25th Canadian Parliament
