= Michael Kelway Oliver =

Canadian political scientist, economist and university administrator

President of the New Democratic Party
- In office 1961–1963
- Preceded by: Position created
- Succeeded by: Merv Johnson

Personal details
- Born: February 2, 1925 North Bay, Ontario, Canada
- Died: September 29, 2004 (aged 79)
- Occupation: Professor, University administrator

Michael Kelway Oliver OC (February 2, 1925 – September 29, 2004) was a Canadian academic, political organizer and the sixth president of Carleton University in Ottawa, Ontario, Canada.

Oliver was born in North Bay, Ontario on February 2, 1925. He finished his BA, MA and PhD studies at McGill University in 1948, 1950 and 1957 respectively. He stayed at McGill to teach economics and political science, eventually founding the school's French Canada Studies program. From 1967 to 1972, he was McGill's vice-principal (academic).

While teaching at McGill, Oliver became actively interested in the left-wing Co-operative Commonwealth Federation (CCF). When that party morphed into the New Democratic Party in 1961, Oliver was its first federal president, a post he held until 1963. He then began a six-year stint as research director of the Royal Commission on Bilingualism and Biculturalism, a body co-chaired by then Carleton University president Davidson Dunton — the man Oliver would eventually replace in 1972.

Oliver's tenure as Carleton's president was a period of serious financial hardship for the university owing to dwindling provincial funding and a post-baby-boom decline in enrolment growth. Oliver's cutbacks did not endear him to the faculty, but the student government would later name its flagship campus bar Oliver's after him.

Oliver never lost his sense of humour, nor his capacity for being frank. At the Fall Convocation in 1978 (his last), his speech included the following sentence: "I came to Carleton the same way I am leaving: 'Fired with enthusiasm'".

From 1993 to 1996, Oliver was national president of the United Nations Association in Canada. From 1980, he was the first president of the Canadian Centre for Policy Alternatives.

Oliver married Joan Nelson in 1948 and had five children: David, James, Victoria, Geoffrey and Cynthia. He died two years after being inducted as an officer of the Order of Canada.

== Archives ==
There is Michael Kelway Oliver fonds at Library and Archives Canada.
