= New Party (Canada) =

Provisional political party

The logo of the New Party during 1961.

New Party was the interim name used by the new political party being established in Canada from 1958 to 1961 by the Co-operative Commonwealth Federation (CCF) and the Canadian Labour Congress (CLC), which eventually defined itself as a social democratic party. In 1958 a joint CCF-CLC committee, the National Committee for the New Party (NCNP), was formed and spent the next three years laying down the foundations of the "New Party". During the process of founding the party, the New Party name was used in the October 1960 Peterborough, Canadian federal by-election; which was won by its candidate, Walter Pitman. In August 1961, at the end of a five-day-long convention, the New Democratic Party (NDP) was born and Tommy Douglas was elected its first leader. Once the NDP was formed, the New Party clubs and affiliates automatically ceased, and became part of the newly formed party.

== See also ==
- Co-operative Commonwealth Federation (Ontario Section)
- Major James Coldwell
- Claude Jodoin
- Stanley Knowles
- David Lewis (Canadian politician)
- Donald MacDonald (Nova Scotia politician)
- Donald C. MacDonald

== Bibliography ==
- MacDonald, Donald C. (1998). The Happy Warrior: Political Memoirs (2nd ed.). Toronto: Dundurn Press. ISBN 978-1-55002-307-7.
- Morton, Desmond (1986). The New Democrats, 1961-1986: The Politics of Change (3rd ed.). Toronto: Copp Clark Pitman. ISBN 978-0-7730-4618-4.
- Stewart, Walter (2000). M.J.: The Life and Times of M.J. Coldwell. Toronto: Stoddart Publishing. ISBN 978-0-7737-3232-2.
- Young, Walter D. (1969). The Anatomy of a Party: The National CCF 1932–61. University of Toronto Press. ISBN 978-0-8020-5221-6.
