= Allan Warnke =

Canadian politician (1946–2021)

Member of the British Columbia Legislative Assembly for Richmond-Steveston
- In office October 17, 1991 – May 28, 1996
- Preceded by: Riding established
- Succeeded by: Geoff Plant

Personal details
- Born: Allan Edward Warnke; October 27, 1946 Edmonton, Alberta, Canada
- Died: June 27, 2021 (aged 74) Richmond, British Columbia, Canada
- Party: British Columbia Liberal Party (1991-1996); Independent (1996-2001)
- Other political affiliations: Liberal Party of Canada (ca. 1988); Canadian Action Party (ca. 2000-2004)
- Spouse: Geraldine Warnke (died 2018)
- Occupation: political scientist; professor

Allan Warnke (October 27, 1946 – June 27, 2021) was a Canadian political scientist, professor and politician. He was a former Liberal member of the Legislative Assembly (MLA) of British Columbia, representing the Richmond-Steveston electoral district from 1991 to 1996.

== Biography ==
Before his election to the BC legislature, he ran as a BC Liberal Party candidate in the 1983 provincial election in the dual-member Vancouver-Point Grey riding, and as a candidate of the Liberal Party of Canada in the 1988 federal election in the riding of North Island—Powell River. He then contested the 1991 provincial election as a BC Liberal candidate, and defeated former MLA Harold Steves of the New Democratic Party to become member of the legislative assembly for Richmond-Steveston. He served as the official opposition critic for aboriginal affairs in the 35th Parliament. He contested the 1993 BC Liberal leadership election and finished in sixth place.

For the 1996 provincial election, he was passed over for the Liberal nomination in favour of Geoff Plant. Warnke contested the election as an independent candidate, finishing in fifth place. He was an unsuccessful candidate in a 1999 provincial by-election in the riding of Delta South. He then ran again for his old seat in the 2001 provincial election, this time finishing in sixth place. He also ran as a candidate of the Canadian Action Party in the 2000 federal election in the riding of Delta—South Richmond, then in 2004 in the riding of Richmond, but was unsuccessful in both attempts.

Warnke was a professor of political science at Vancouver Island University and its predecessor Malaspina University-College, as well as being the department chair. He died suddenly in June 2021 from heart disease and medical complications due to obesity and hypertension. He was predeceased by his wife of forty-one years Geraldine (née Byers).

== Electoral record ==
=== Provincial ===
2001 British Columbia general election: Richmond-Steveston
Party	Candidate	Votes	%	Expenditures
Liberal	Geoff Plant	14,508	69.23	$56,820
New Democratic	Billie Mortimer	2,564	12.24	$2,734
Green	Kevan Hudson	2,257	10.77	$1,063
Marijuana	Gordon Mathias	561	2.68	$705
Unity	Vincent Paul	381	1.82	$610
Independent	Allan Warnke	358	1.71	$1,562
Conservative	Barry Edward Chilton	160	0.76	$240
Reform	Sue Wade	145	0.69	$610
People's Front	Edith Petersen	21	0.10	$100
Total valid votes		20,955	100.00	
Total rejected ballots		125	0.60	
Turnout		21,080	73.27	
Source: Elections BC

1996 British Columbia general election: Richmond-Steveston
Party	Candidate	Votes	%	Expenditures
Liberal	Geoff Plant	9,643	56.65	$39,769
New Democratic	Gail Paquette	5,041	29.61	$32,144
Progressive Democrat	Pat Young	919	5.40	$550
Reform	Shirley Abraham-Kirk	556	3.27	$2,765
Independent	Allan Warnke	450	2.64	$5,795
Green	Brian Gold	188	1.10	$100
Conservative	Gary L. Cross	99	0.58	$1,132
Social Credit	Gordon Neuls	88	0.52	$4,315
Natural Law	Nancy Stewart	38	0.23	$123
Total valid votes		17,022	100.00	
Total rejected ballots		85	0.50	
Turnout		17,107	74.36	
Source: Elections BC

1991 British Columbia general election: Richmond-Steveston
Party	Candidate	Votes	%	Expenditures
Liberal	Allan Warnke	6,664	38.32	$2,332
New Democratic	Harold Steves	6,054	34.81	$24,142
Social Credit	Nick Loenen	4,609	26.50	$44,277
Conservative	Gary L. Cross	65	3.19	$2,858
Total valid votes		17,392	100.00	
Total rejected ballots		321	1.81	
Turnout		17,713	77.67	

=== Federal ===
2004 Canadian federal election: Richmond
Party	Candidate	Votes	%	±%	Expenditures
Liberal	Raymond Chan	18,204	44.48	+2.44	$64,433.53
Conservative	Alice Wong	14,457	35.33	–14.52	$65,716.31
New Democratic	Dale Jackaman	6,142	15.01	+0.00	$11,072.35
Green	Stephen H.F. Kronstein	1,743	4.26	+2.37	$160.50
Canadian Action	Allan Warnke	376	0.92	–	$492.28
Total valid votes/expense limit		40,922	99.45	–	$74,099.04
Total rejected ballots		226	0.55	+0.09	
Turnout		41,148	56.69	–5.01	
Eligible voters		72,585			
Liberal gain from Conservative		Swing		+8.48	
Source: Elections Canada

2000 Canadian federal election: Delta—South Richmond
Party	Candidate	Votes	%	±%	Expenditures
Alliance	John Cummins	30,882	56.79	+10.29	$59,872
Liberal	Jim Doswell	15,858	29.16	–7.95	$67,469
Progressive Conservative	Curtis MacDonald	3,838	7.06	+1.55	$123
New Democratic	Ernie Fulton	3,060	5.63	–3.55	$2,416
Canadian Action	Allan Warnke	517	0.95	–	none listed
No affiliation	Frank Wagner	225	0.41	–0.19	$626
Total valid votes		54,380	99.69		
Total rejected ballots		170	0.31	–0.03	
Turnout		54,550	65.84	–2.91	
Eligible voters		82,852			
Alliance notional hold		Swing		–	
Source: Elections Canada

1988 Canadian federal election: North Island—Powell River
Party	Candidate	Votes	%	±%
New Democratic	Ray Skelly	22,179	52.02	–
Progressive Conservative	Michel Rabu	10,411	24.42	–
Liberal	Allan Warnke	6,867	16.11	–
Christian Heritage	John A. Krell	1,521	3.57	–
Reform	Dodd W. Pellant	718	1.68	–
Green	Michael Conway-Brown	519	1.22	–
Rhinoceros	Philip John Hicks	299	0.70	–
Communist	Nickolas Chernoff	121	0.28	–
Total valid votes		42,635	99.76	
Total rejected ballots		102	0.24	–
Turnout		42,737	77.22	–
Eligible voters		55,348		
New Democratic notional hold		Swing		–
This riding was created from Comox—Powell River, and New Democrat Ray Skelly was the incumbent.
Source: Elections Canada
