= Quick Wins ethnic outreach scandal =

2013 political scandal in British Columbia, Canada

The Quick Wins ethnic outreach scandal also known as "Ethnicgate" was a political controversy beginning in 2013 in the Canadian province of British Columbia (BC) that resulted in the resignations of public servants and a cabinet minister in 2013 and Elections Act charges in 2014 against two staff members of the British Columbia Liberal Party.

A government review concluded that public servants were using their time and government resources to engage with ethnic communities for partisan purposes. An investigation by the RCMP and a special prosecutor also charged two Liberal party staffers with violations of the Elections Act in failing to disclose financial contributions for a byelection campaign. The trial was expected to proceed in 2015.

== Disclosure ==
On February 27, 2013, the Official Opposition (the BC NDP) used Question Period in the legislature to make public some leaked documents that showed the governing Liberal Party had prepared a Multicultural Strategic Outreach Plan that targeted "quick wins"—such as official apologies for historical wrongs like the Komagata Maru incident—to gain support from ethnic communities through a potential mix of partisan and provincial government activities and resources. It referred to collecting lists of names from government programs for Liberal party use, preparing criticism of political opponents and stressed a need for secrecy and subterfuge by using personal email accounts, not government ones.

Representatives of Chinese-Canadian, Indo-Canadian and other ethnic communities responded to the scandal due to perceiving the plan as being disrespectful, immoral and causing outrage.

== Government review ==
Premier Christy Clark hosted an emergency cabinet meeting. Clark repeatedly apologized in the legislature for the issue, calling it "a very serious mistake."

On February 28, 2013, Premier Clark and her cabinet ministers directed John Dyble, who was Deputy Minister to the Premier, Cabinet Secretary and Head of the BC Public Service, to investigate whether government resources were inappropriately used or the Public Service Act violated in development and implementation of the Liberal Party's Multicultural Strategic Outreach Plan.

Dyble's review conducted 27 interviews and gathered approximately 10,000 pages of documents, including government records from personal e-mail accounts, for events beginning as early as March 2011. The review concluded Kim Haakstad, the Premier's Deputy Chief of Staff, made a "serious breach of the Standards of Conduct" by managing a meeting on December 1, 2011 to exchange information and plan coordination for multicultural outreach between six government employees (including Brian Bonney and Pamela Martin) and five BC Liberal party and caucus staff (including former MLA Lorne Mayencourt). Several participants described the focus of the meeting as unclear whether it was for government or partisan purposes. The resulting work plan caused hiring of community liaison contractors that lacked a clear distinction between being government or Liberal party caucus contractors. The report concluded two public servants breached government procurement standards in assisting applicants to make submissions. The report also said that up to half of Brian Bonney's government-paid time as a ministry communications director was actually used to do partisan work for the Liberal Party.

Premier Clark, MLAs Harry Bloy and John Yap were interviewed as part of the review and stated they had never seen the draft strategy or work plan documents until they were made public in February 2013.

== Impacts ==
Dyble's review recommended clarification of public servants' standards of conduct and use of government e-mail accounts for government-related work.

A public apology in the legislature for the Chinese Head Tax had been planned for March 14, 2013 but was postponed until the next legislative session due to the release of the Dyble review on that date.

=== Resignations ===
Shortly before the plan was made public by the NDP, Brian Bonney had resigned as communications director for multiculturalism. Given the conclusion of Dyble's review that Bonney spent up to half of his government-paid time working on partisan activities, the BC Liberal Party repaid $70,000 to the government.

Shortly after the plan became public, Haakstad resigned from being Premier Clark's Deputy Chief of Staff. She later volunteered to assist Clark's unsuccessful campaign to be re-elected as MLA for Vancouver-Point Grey.

Due to the ongoing investigation by Dyble, Yap resigned as Minister of Advanced Education, Innovation and Technology and Minister Responsible for Multiculturalism on March 4, 2013. He had justified the use of personal e-mail accounts by public servants and politicians to prevent release of the information under the Freedom of Information Act. Yap was then re-elected as MLA for Richmond-Steveston two months after resigning from cabinet.

=== 2013 election campaigns ===
Prior to the May election, two outgoing Liberal MLAs, Kash Heed and Dave Hayer, both Indo-Canadians, called the plan insulting and demanded those responsible be held accountable. Dave Hayer's criticism of his party's work on the Quick Wins strategy: This proposed outreach plan was insulting to the intended targeted communities and was, when I found out about it, insulting to me and to all other MLAs who believe in doing things properly, fairly and within the rules and laws of the legislature... Nobody in their right mind would be telling anybody to do anything like this. I can tell you, all the MLAs I talked to think this is wrong. We think whoever did this should be held responsible.

Some Liberal riding associations lost members and a group of 89 party members made a public call for the resignation of Clark. In the lead-up to the May 2013 election, the Quick Wins scandal was credited as a factor in Christy Clark's trailing Adrian Dix by 20 points in polls. However on election day, the majority of voters continued to support the Liberal party.

=== Special prosecution ===
In August 2013, three months after the NDP's election loss, Opposition leader Adrian Dix sent correspondence to the RCMP calling for an investigation based on alleged new information.

In 2014, special prosecutor David Butcher approved charges against Brian Bonney and Liberal party staffer Mark Robertson for violating the provincial Election Act due to an alleged failure to disclose a $2,240 campaign contribution to the Liberal party during the spring 2012 byelection in Port Moody-Coquitlam.

Sepideh Sarrafpour, a BC Liberal caucus ethnic outreach contractor from October 2011 to October 2012, was expected to be a witness in the trial due to attempts by the accused in involving her in the by-election campaign. Her possible involvement was made public by inclusion of an e-mail from Brian Bonney in the Dyble review: Have [MLA] Harry Bloy meet with her and explain how doing anything would damage the Premier and the party. Have him say how he will try to find her work and get her back involved... If need be, offer x dollars per month to do non public work up to election [developing her database of potential supporters].
