= Dave Worthy =

Canadian politician

Member of Parliament for Cariboo—Chilcotin
- In office 1988–1993
- Preceded by: Lorne Greenaway
- Succeeded by: Philip Mayfield

Personal details
- Born: 15 September 1934 Consul, Saskatchewan, Canada
- Died: 27 December 2004 (aged 70)
- Party: Progressive Conservative

Dave Worthy (15 September 1934 – 27 December 2004) was a member of the House of Commons of Canada from 1988 to 1993. He was born in Consul, Saskatchewan and had a varied career including teaching, computer engineering, hotel management and general business.

He was elected in the 1988 federal election at the Cariboo—Chilcotin electoral district for the Progressive Conservative party. He served in the 34th Canadian Parliament but lost to Philip Mayfield of the Reform Party in the 1993 federal election.
