= North Island—Powell River =

Federal electoral district in British Columbia, Canada

British Columbia electoral district
- Interactive map of riding boundaries from the 2025 federal election

Federal electoral district
- Legislature: House of Commons
MP
Aaron Gunn
Conservative
- District created: 2013
- First contested: 2015
- Last contested: 2025
- District webpage: profile, map

Demographics
- Population (2011): 103,458
- Electors (2015): 79,517
- Area (km²): 57,911
- Pop. density (per km²): 1.8
- Census division(s): Comox Valley, Mount Waddington, qathet, Strathcona
- Census subdivision(s): Campbell River, Courtenay (part), Comox, Powell River, Port Hardy, Port McNeill, Gold River, Sliammon, Port Alice, Campbell River

North Island—Powell River is a federal electoral district in British Columbia, Canada, that was represented in the House of Commons of Canada from 1988 to 1997, and again since 2015. This riding was created in 1987 from parts of Comox—Powell River riding and contested for the first time at the 34th federal election on 21 November 1988. It was abolished in 1996 when it was merged into Vancouver Island North riding, and it ceased to be represented in the House of Commons effective at the call of the 36th federal election on 2 June 1997.

The riding consisted of the southern part of Kitimat-Stikine Regional District, the Central Coast Regional District, the Mount Waddington Regional District, the northwest part of the Comox-Strathcona Regional District, the Sunshine Coast Regional District, and the Powell River Regional District, except Electoral Area E.

North Island—Powell River was re-created (initially called Vancouver Island North—Comox—Powell River) by the 2012 federal electoral boundaries redistribution and was legally defined in the 2013 representation order. It came into effect upon the call of the 42nd Canadian federal election, which was held 19 October 2015.

== Demographics ==
Panethnic groups in North Island—Powell River (2011−2021)
Panethnic group	2021		2016		2011	
Panethnic group	Pop.	%	Pop.	%	Pop.	%
European (Note: Statistic includes all persons that did not make up part of a visible minority or an indigenous identity.)	91,320	83.17%	87,400	84.31%	88,465	86.9%
Indigenous	13,400	12.2%	12,475	12.03%	10,560	10.37%
East Asian (Note: Statistic includes total responses of "Chinese", "Korean", and "Japanese" under visible minority section on census.)	1,515	1.38%	1,185	1.14%	575	0.56%
Southeast Asian (Note: Statistic includes total responses of "Filipino" and "Southeast Asian" under visible minority section on census.)	1,390	1.27%	1,125	1.09%	985	0.97%
South Asian	920	0.84%	455	0.44%	370	0.36%
African	505	0.46%	430	0.41%	330	0.32%
Latin American	370	0.34%	295	0.28%	300	0.29%
Middle Eastern (Note: Statistic includes total responses of "West Asian" and "Arab" under visible minority section on census.)	80	0.07%	75	0.07%	20	0.02%
Other (Note: Statistic includes total responses of "Visible minority, n.i.e." and "Multiple visible minorities" under visible minority section on census.)	300	0.27%	230	0.22%	200	0.2%
Total responses	109,800	98.19%	103,670	98.3%	101,800	98.33%
Total population	111,825	100%	105,466	100%	103,525	100%
Notes: Totals greater than 100% due to multiple origin responses. Demographics based on 2012 Canadian federal electoral redistribution riding boundaries.

== Members of Parliament ==
Parliament	Years	Member	Party
North Island—Powell River; Riding created from Comox—Powell River
34th	1988–1993	Ray Skelly	New Democratic
35th	1993–1997	John Duncan	Reform
Riding dissolved into Vancouver Island North, West Vancouver—Sunshine Coast, Skeena and Cariboo—Chilcotin
Riding re-created from Vancouver Island North and West Vancouver—Sunshine Coast—Sea to Sky Country
42nd	2015–2019	Rachel Blaney	New Democratic
43rd	2019–2021	Rachel Blaney	New Democratic
44th	2021–2025	Rachel Blaney	New Democratic
45th	2025–present	Aaron Gunn	Conservative

== Electoral history ==
=== North Island—Powell River, 2015–present ===
View source data.
Graph of election results in North Island—Powell River (since 2015, minor parties that never got 2% of the vote or didn't run consistently are omitted)

2025 Canadian federal election
Party	Candidate	Votes	%	±%	Expenditures
Conservative	Aaron Gunn	31,356	38.75	+2.53	$174,523.26
New Democratic	Tanille Johnston	26,357	32.57	–6.89	$149,343.37
Liberal	Jennifer Lash	21,218	26.22	+12.92	$72,254.69
Green	Jessica Wegg	1,505	1.86	–4.00	$21,230.01
People's	Paul Macknight	341	0.42	–4.14	$331.30
Independent	Glen Staples	152	0.19	–	none listed
Total valid votes/expense limit		80,929	99.62	–	$182,182.83
Total rejected ballots		311	0.38		
Turnout		81,240	73.84		
Eligible voters		110,017			
Conservative notional gain from New Democratic		Swing		+4.71	
Source: Elections Canada

2021 federal election redistributed results
Party	Vote	%
New Democratic	26,918	39.46
Conservative	24,707	36.22
Liberal	9,076	13.30
Green	3,999	5.86
People's	3,113	4.56
Others	403	0.59

2021 Canadian federal election
Party	Candidate	Votes	%	±%	Expenditures
New Democratic	Rachel Blaney	23,833	39.55	+1.67	$57,664.61
Conservative	Shelley Downey	21,670	35.96	+3.37	$62,144.17
Liberal	Jennifer B. Grenz	7,922	13.15	+0.03	$44,209.34
Green	Jessica Wegg	3,656	6.07	–8.07	$22,023.44
People's	Paul Macknight	2,795	4.64	+2.89	none listed
Maverick	Stacey Gastis	310	0.51	–	$26,200.41
Marxist–Leninist	Carla Neal	77	0.13	+0.05	none listed
Total valid votes/expense limit		60,263	99.31	–	$147,765.33
Total rejected ballots		421	0.69	+0.23	
Turnout		60,684	65.14	–4.74	
Eligible voters		93,163			
New Democratic hold		Swing		–0.85	
Source: Elections Canada

2019 Canadian federal election
Party	Candidate	Votes	%	±%	Expenditures
New Democratic	Rachel Blaney	23,834	37.88	–2.32	$62,901.41
Conservative	Shelley Downey	20,502	32.59	+6.42	$50,286.20
Green	Mark de Bruijn	8,891	14.13	+5.97	$34,354.18
Liberal	Peter Schwarzhoff	8,251	13.11	–12.35	$38,420.58
People's	Brian Rundle	1,102	1.75	–	$5,894.54
Independent	Glen Staples	287	0.46	–	$3,027.54
Marxist–Leninist	Carla Neal	48	0.08	–	none listed
Total valid votes/expense limit		62,915	99.54	–	$141,203.92
Total rejected ballots		291	0.46	+0.17	
Turnout		63,206	69.88	–4.73	
Eligible voters		90,454			
New Democratic hold		Swing		–4.37	
Source: Elections Canada

2015 Canadian federal election
Party	Candidate	Votes	%	±%	Expenditures
New Democratic	Rachel Blaney	24,340	40.21	–1.53	$139,441.92
Conservative	Laura Smith	15,840	26.17	–19.86	$83,346.00
Liberal	Peter Schwarzhoff	15,416	25.47	+19.11	$40,436.14
Green	Brenda Sayers	4,940	8.16	+3.01	$37,000.01
Total valid votes/expense limit		60,536	99.71	–	$268,365.27
Total rejected ballots		177	0.29		
Turnout		60,713	74.61		
Eligible voters		81,377			
New Democratic notional gain from Conservative		Swing		+9.17	
Source: Elections Canada

2011 federal election redistributed results
Party	Vote	%
Conservative	23,425	46.03
New Democratic	21,239	41.74
Liberal	3,236	6.36
Green	2,623	5.15
Others	367	0.72

=== North Island—Powell River, 1988–1997 ===
1993 Canadian federal election
Party	Candidate	Votes	%	±%
Reform	John Duncan	18,256	39.28	+37.60
Liberal	Al Huddlestan	11,880	25.56	+9.45
New Democratic	Ray Skelly	7,823	16.83	–35.19
Progressive Conservative	Mark Von Schellwitz	3,673	7.90	–16.52
National	Mark A. Grenier	3,418	7.35	–
Green	Michael Mascall	1,015	2.18	+0.97
Natural Law	Wayne A. Melvin	254	0.55	–
Canada Party	James Peter Turner	158	0.34	–
Total valid votes		46,477	99.60	
Total rejected ballots		189	0.41	+0.17
Turnout		46,666	68.01	–9.21
Eligible voters		68,621		
Reform gain from New Democratic		Swing		+14.08
Source: Elections Canada

1988 Canadian federal election
Party	Candidate	Votes	%	±%
New Democratic	Ray Skelly	22,179	52.02	–
Progressive Conservative	Michel Rabu	10,411	24.42	–
Liberal	Allan Warnke	6,867	16.11	–
Christian Heritage	John A. Krell	1,521	3.57	–
Reform	Dodd W. Pellant	718	1.68	–
Green	Michael Conway-Brown	519	1.22	–
Rhinoceros	Philip John Hicks	299	0.70	–
Communist	Nickolas Chernoff	121	0.28	–
Total valid votes		42,635	99.76	
Total rejected ballots		102	0.24	–
Turnout		42,737	77.22	–
Eligible voters		55,348		
New Democratic notional hold		Swing		–
This riding was created from Comox—Powell River, and New Democrat Ray Skelly was the incumbent.
Source: Elections Canada

== Student vote results ==
=== 2025 ===
2025 Canadian federal election
Party	Candidate	Votes	%
Conservative	Aaron Gunn	1,835	35.71
New Democratic	Tanille Johnston	1,392	27.09
Liberal	Jennifer Lash	973	18.94
Green	Jessica Wegg	612	11.91
People's	Paul Macknight	199	3.87
Independent	Glen Staples	127	2.47
Total votes		5,138	100
Source: Student Vote Canada

=== 2019 ===
Canadian federal election: 2019
Party	Candidate	Votes	%
New Democratic	Rachel Blaney	1,679	36,14
Green	Mark de Brujin	1,283	27.62
Conservative	Shelley Downey	888	19.11
Liberal	Peter Schwarzhoff	421	9.06
People's	Brian Rundle	195	4.20
Independent	Glen Staples	96	2.07
Marxist–Leninist	Carla Neal	84	1.81
Total votes		4,646	100
Source: Student Vote Canada

== See also ==
- List of Canadian electoral districts
- Historical federal electoral districts of Canada
