= Jack Pearsall =

Canadian politician

Member of the Canadian Parliament for Coast Chilcotin
- In office July 1974 – March 1979
- Preceded by: Harry Olaussen
- Succeeded by: District was abolished in 1976

Personal details
- Born: 27 April 1915 Vancouver, British Columbia, Canada
- Died: 8 November 1982 (aged 67) Ottawa, Ontario, Canada
- Party: Liberal
- Profession: payroll clerk

Albert John Pearsall (27 April 1915 – 8 November 1982) was a Liberal member of the House of Commons of Canada. He was born in Vancouver, British Columbia and became a senior payroll clerk by career.

He was first elected at the Coast Chilcotin riding in the 1974 general election and served in the 30th Canadian Parliament. In the 1979 election, riding boundaries were changed and Pearsall campaigned in the Comox—Powell River riding, but lost to Ray Skelly of the New Democratic Party. Pearsall died while on a trip to Ottawa in 1982, at the age of 67.
