= Harry Olaussen =

Canadian politician (born 1929)

Harry Magnus Olaussen
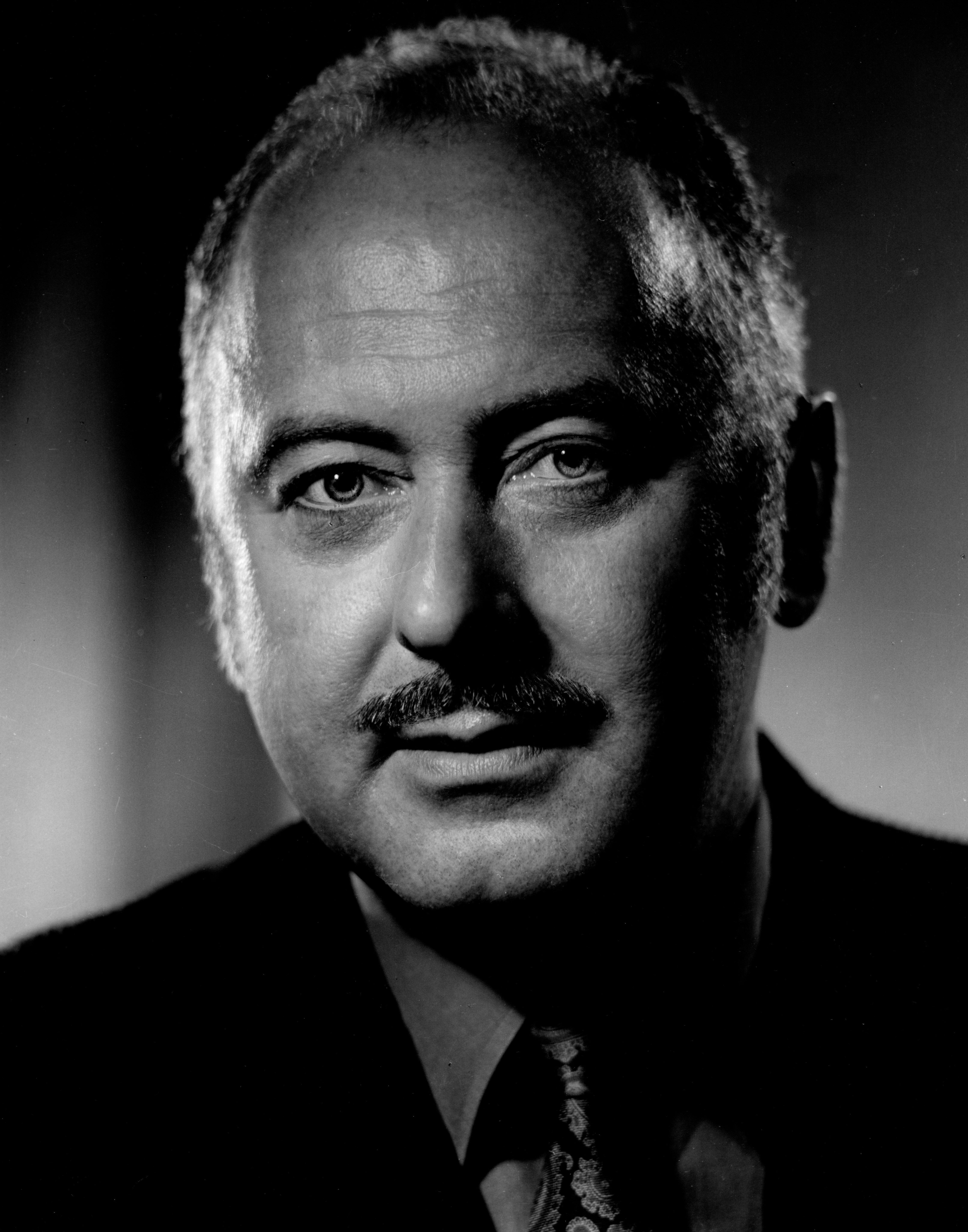

Member of the Canadian Parliament for Coast Chilcotin
- In office October 1972 – May 1974
- Preceded by: Paul St. Pierre
- Succeeded by: Jack Pearsall

Personal details
- Born: 8 October 1929 (age 96) Shanghai, China
- Party: New Democratic Party
- Profession: merchant seaman, stationary engineer, steam engineer

Harry Magnus Olaussen (born 8 October 1929) is a retired Canadian politician who was a New Democratic Party member of the House of Commons of Canada. He was a merchant seaman, stationary engineer and steam engineer by career.

Olaussen was first elected at the Coast Chilcotin riding in the 1972 general election. After serving one term, the 29th Canadian Parliament, he was defeated at Coast Chilcotin by Jack Pearsall of the Liberal party in the 1974 election. He also campaigned in the 1979 and 1980 federal elections at Cariboo—Chilcotin, but was defeated by Lorne Greenaway of the Progressive Conservative Party.
