= Paul St. Pierre =

Canadian politician

Member of the Canadian Parliament for Coast Chilcotin
- In office 1968–1972
- Preceded by: District was created in 1968
- Succeeded by: Harry Olaussen

Personal details
- Born: October 14, 1923 Chicago, Illinois
- Died: July 27, 2014 (aged 90) Fort Langley, British Columbia, Canada
- Citizenship: Canada
- Occupation: Journalist, author
- Portfolio: Parliamentary Secretary to the Secretary of State for External Affairs (1971-1972)

Paul St. Pierre (October 14, 1923 – July 27, 2014) was a journalist and author in British Columbia, Canada. He was the Member of Parliament for the riding of Coast Chilcotin from 1968 to 1972. He was defeated in the 1972 election by New Democratic Party candidate Harry Olaussen in a tight three-way race (see results below). He was especially known for his popular fiction recounting adventures and quirks of life in the Chilcotin-Cariboo, and for a regular column that appeared for many years in the Vancouver Sun.

One of his novellas set in the Chilcotin, Breaking Smith's Quarter Horse, was adapted into a feature film starring Glenn Ford. Also starring in that film was Chief Dan George, who played the character Ol' Antoine in the CBC-TV series Cariboo Country, based on his stories. St. Pierre continued to write and maintain residences in the Chilcotin, the Fraser Valley and Teacapán, Mexico.

He once remarked “In British Columbia politics is an adventure, on the Prairies a cause, in Ontario a business, in Quebec a religion, and in the Maritimes a disease”.

In politics, he was a member of the Liberal Party. His riding spanned the Central Coast, then including the large pulp mill town of Ocean Falls and the western part of the Cariboo and the Squamish-Lillooet in a time when the largest town was Bralorne, and both were isolated as well as separated by each other by vast mountains. Other voters were in the Chilcotin Plateau and Cariboo, over yet another set of mountains and/or huge plateaus from the other towns on the coast and in the southern part of the riding. In those days Squamish was still only accessible by ferry from downtown Vancouver, and the rail line came no farther south. Most of the remaining major towns in the riding, Squamish, Lillooet, Powell River, Sechelt, Ocean Falls and Bella Coola, were all separated from each other and all those mentioned by either water or rail - or, in the case of Lillooet to Bella Coola, an arduously long and difficult drive via 100 Mile House and Williams Lake; the latter was among the three or four largest towns in the riding and is today central to the Cariboo riding.

Because it was easier St. Pierre was one of the "flying MPs" whose ridings spanned whole European countries in size, and where many voters were distant from the capital and living in areas difficult to get around in, never mind to. As with George Murray, Member of the Legislative Assembly in the provincial riding of Lillooet, which is in the southeastern part of the federal riding, once he became the area's representative, he moved there and fell in love with it. His books are classics of the cowboy genre and also constitute documents of individuals and notes on local natural history and myth, and serve as portraits of the cultures of the Chilcotin, Cariboo and Nechako districts of British Columbia.

He died at home on July 27, 2014.

== Books ==
- Breaking Smith's Quarter Horse
- Smith and Other Events
- Boss of the Namko Drive
- Chilcotin Holiday
- British Columbia, Our Land
- Old Enough to Know Better
- Tell Me A Good Lie
- In the Navel of the Moon
- Sister Balonika
- Dry Storm

== Awards ==
- Western Writers of America Spur Award (first Canadian honoured)
- Terasen (BC Gas) Lifetime Achievement Award 2000
