= Coast Chilcotin =

Former federal electoral district in British Columbia, Canada

British Columbia electoral district

Defunct federal electoral district
- Legislature: House of Commons
- District created: 1968
- District abolished: 1979
- First contested: 1968
- Last contested: 1974

Coast Chilcotin was a federal electoral district represented in the House of Commons of Canada from 1968 to 1979. It was located in the province of British Columbia.

== Geography ==
The riding spanned the southern Coast Mountains and included the Central Coast through Queen Charlotte Strait and Johnstone Strait to the Sunshine Coast and Howe Sound, as well as the Chilcotin Plateau and from the Cariboo down to Howe Sound via Lillooet.

== History ==
Coast Chilcotin was created in 1966 and incorporated components of these other ridings:

- Cariboo
- Coast—Capilano
- Comox—Alberni
- Fraser Valley
- Kamloops
- Skeena

The most significant components were those from Comox—Alberni (the Sunshine Coast), Cariboo and Coast—Capilano. Coast Chilcotin was first used in the Canadian federal election of 1968. It was abolished in 1976 when it was redistributed between:

- Cariboo—Chilcotin
- Comox—Powell River
- Capilano

== Members of Parliament ==
Parliament	Years	Member	Party
Riding created from Comox—Alberni, Cariboo, Coast—Capilano, Fraser Valley, Kamloops and Skeena
28th	1968–1972	Paul St. Pierre	Liberal
29th	1972–1974	Harry Olaussen	New Democratic
30th	1974–1979	Jack Pearsall	Liberal
Riding dissolved into Cariboo—Chilcotin, Comox—Powell River and Capilano

== Election results ==
=== 1974 ===
1974 Canadian federal election
Party	Candidate	Votes	%	±%
Liberal	Jack Pearsall	10,336	35.23	+2.16
Progressive Conservative	Lorne Greenaway	9,988	34.05	+4.50
New Democratic	Harry Olaussen	8,655	29.50	–4.97
Independent	Gerry Karagianis	356	1.21	–
Total valid votes		29,335	99.70	
Total rejected ballots		88	0.30	–0.36
Turnout		29,423	67.34	–0.62
Eligible voters		43,695		
Liberal gain from New Democratic		Swing		–1.17
Source: Library of Parliament

=== 1972 ===
1972 Canadian federal election
Party	Candidate	Votes	%	±%
New Democratic	Harry Olaussen	8,868	34.47	+0.10
Liberal	Paul St. Pierre	8,508	33.07	–14.24
Progressive Conservative	John Pankratz	7,601	29.55	+18.72
Social Credit	Lew King	749	2.91	–4.58
Total valid votes		25,726	99.34	
Total rejected ballots		170	0.66	–0.21
Turnout		25,896	67.96	–1.71
Eligible voters		38,105		
New Democratic gain from Liberal		Swing		+7.17
Source: Library of Parliament

=== 1968 ===
1968 Canadian federal election
Party	Candidate	Votes	%	±%
Liberal	Paul St. Pierre	10,292	47.31	–
New Democratic	Hartley Douglas Dent	7,477	34.37	–
Progressive Conservative	Gordon Hopkin	2,355	10.83	–
Social Credit	Andy Widsten	1,629	7.49	–
Total valid votes		21,753	99.13	
Total rejected ballots		190	0.87	–
Turnout		21,943	69.67	–
Eligible voters		31,494		
This riding was created from Comox—Alberni, Cariboo, Coast—Capilano and small parts of Fraser Valley, Kamloops and Skeena. They elected a New Democrat, a Social Credit, a Liberal, a Social Credit, a Progressive Conservative and a New Democrat, respectively, in the last election. Neither of the incumbents ran in this riding.
Source: Library of Parliament

== See also ==
- List of Canadian electoral districts
- Historical federal electoral districts of Canada
