= Kelly Greene =

Canadian politician

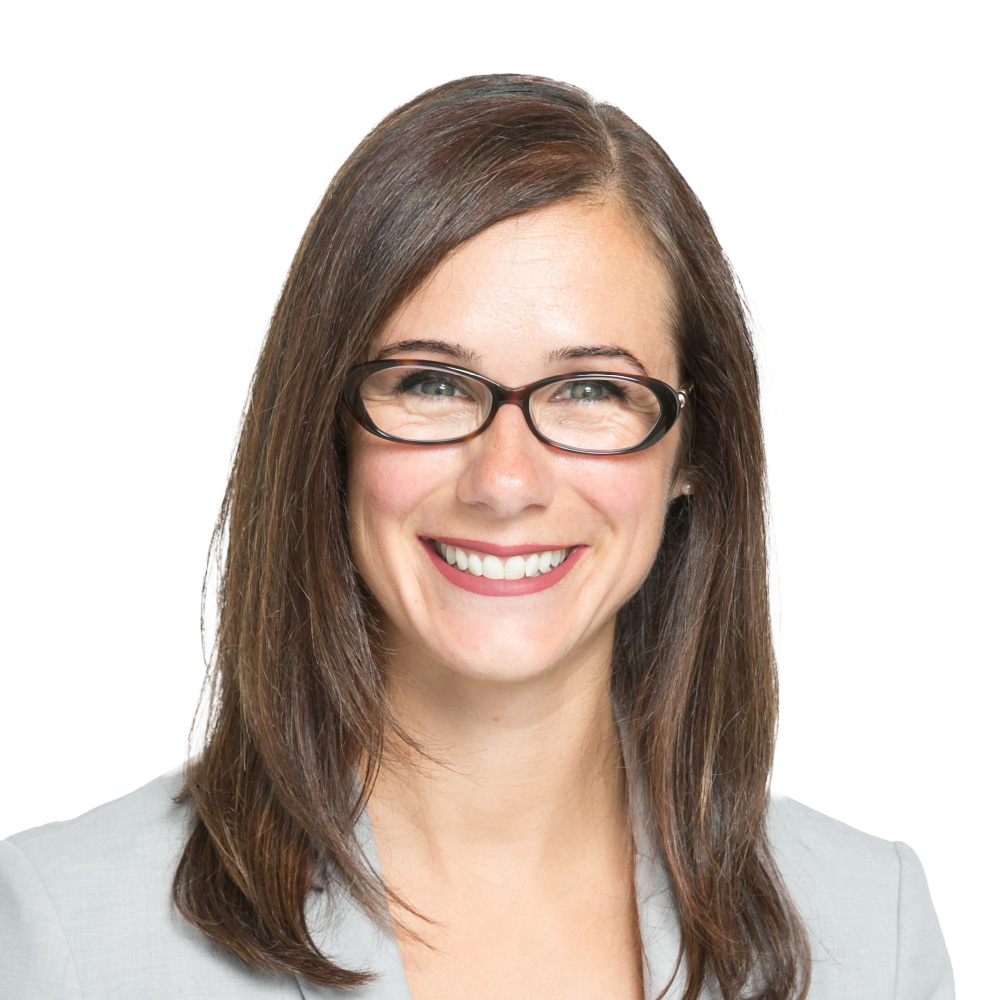
- Campaign portrait, 2024

Minister of Emergency Management and Climate Readiness for British Columbia
- In office November 18, 2024 – November 20, 2026
- Premier: David Eby
- Preceded by: Bowinn Ma

Parliamentary Secretary for Fisheries and Aquaculture of British Columbia
- In office December 7, 2022 – November 18, 2024
- Premier: David Eby
- Preceded by: Fin Donnelly
- Succeeded by: Position abolished

Parliamentary Secretary for the Environment of British Columbia
- In office November 26, 2020 – December 7, 2022
- Premier: John Horgan; David Eby
- Preceded by: Sheila Malcolmson
- Succeeded by: Aman Singh

Member of the British Columbia Legislative Assembly for Richmond-Steveston
- In office October 24, 2020 – October 24, 2026
- Preceded by: John Yap
- Succeeded by: Gordon Zhang

Member of the Richmond, British Columbia City Council
- In office October 21, 2018 – November 16, 2020

Personal details
- Born: Richmond, British Columbia, Canada
- Party: New Democratic
- Other political affiliations: Richmond Citizen's Association (municipal)
- Education: University of British Columbia (BA)

Kelly Greene is a Canadian politician who was elected to the Legislative Assembly of British Columbia in the 2020 British Columbia general election. She represented the electoral district of Richmond-Steveston as a member of the British Columbia New Democratic Party (BC NDP). She also served as Minister of Emergency Management and Climate Readiness for British Columbia. From 2018 to 2020 she served as a city councillor in Richmond.

== Biography ==
Born in Richmond, Greene grew up in the community of Steveston and went to Hugh Boyd Secondary School. She attended the University of British Columbia, graduating with a bachelor of arts in 2002, then worked for accounting and banking firms.

In 2016 she became involved in a local parent group against school closures in Richmond, leading her to consider entering politics. In the 2017 provincial election she ran for the NDP in Richmond-Steveston, placing second against incumbent Liberal candidate John Yap. She was then elected to the Richmond City Council in the 2018 municipal election.

Greene contested the riding of Richmond-Steveston as an NDP candidate again in the 2020 provincial election, this time winning the seat by taking 52% of the vote, ahead of Liberal candidate Matt Pitcairn. On November 16, 2020, she resigned her city council role to become a member of the Legislative Assembly (MLA). She was named Parliamentary Secretary for the Environment by Premier John Horgan on November 26, 2020, supporting Minister of Environment and Climate Change Strategy George Heyman.

On December 7, 2022 she was appointed Parliamentary Secretary for Fisheries and Aquaculture by Premier David Eby, supporting Minister of Water, Land and Resource Stewardship Nathan Cullen.

On November 18, 2024, Greene was named Minister of Emergency Management and Climate Readiness. On September 22, 2026, Greene announced that she would not be seeking re-election in the October 2026 provincial election.

== Electoral history ==
=== Provincial elections ===
2024 British Columbia general election: Richmond-Steveston
Party	Candidate	Votes	%	±%	Expenditures
New Democratic	Kelly Greene	10,332	44.27	-7.2	$38,338.99
Conservative	Michelle Mollineaux	9,848	42.20	–	$18,513.57
Unaffiliated	Jackie Lee	2,354	10.09	–	$58,942.71
Green	Elodie Vaudandaine	803	3.44	–	$0.00
Total valid votes/expense limit		23,337	99.78	–	$71,700.08
Total rejected ballots		52	0.22	–	
Turnout		23,389	59.87	–	
Registered voters		39,067			
New Democratic **notional hold**		Swing		-24.7	
Source: Elections BC

2020 British Columbia general election: Richmond-Steveston
Party	Candidate	Votes	%	±%	Expenditures
New Democratic	Kelly Greene	10,733	52.07	+12.72	$35,020.17
Liberal	Matt Pitcairn	9,398	45.59	−2.01	$49,104.63
Independent	Vince Li	483	2.34	–	$0.00
Total valid votes		20,614	100.00	–	
Total rejected ballots		192	0.92	+0.04	
Turnout		20,806	56.09	−6.68	
Registered voters		37,092			
New Democratic **gain** from Liberal		Swing		+7.37	
Source: Elections BC

2017 British Columbia general election: Richmond-Steveston
Party	Candidate	Votes	%	±%	Expenditures
Liberal	John Yap	10,332	47.60	−4.07	$63,896
New Democratic	Kelly Greene	8,542	39.35	+11.28	$21,429
Green	Roy Sakata	2,833	13.05	+4.91	$2,449
Total valid votes		21,707	100.00	–	
Total rejected ballots		192	0.88	+0.22	
Turnout		21,899	62.77	+7.38	
Registered voters		34,889			
Liberal **hold**		Swing		−7.68	
Source: Elections BC

=== Municipal elections ===
Top 8 candidates elected — Incumbents marked with "(X)". Elected members' names are in bold

2018 British Columbia municipal elections: Richmond City Council
Party	Council candidate	Vote	%
RITE Richmond	**Carol Day** (X)	20,871	7.01
Richmond Citizens' Association	**Harold Steves** (X)	19,136	6.43
Richmond Community Coalition	**Chak Au** (X)	18,026	6.05
Richmond First	**Bill McNulty** (X)	17,242	5.79
Richmond Citizens' Association	**Kelly Greene**	16,464	5.53
Richmond First	**Linda McPhail** (X)	15,521	5.21
RITE Richmond	**Michael Wolfe**	13,627	4.58
Independent	**Alexa Loo** (X)	13,212	4.44
Richmond First	Derek Dang (X)	13,115	4.40
Richmond First	Andy Hobbs	12,336	4.14
Richmond Citizens' Association	Judie Schneider	11,672	3.92
Richmond Community Coalition	Ken Johnston (X)	11,161	3.75
Richmond Community Coalition	Jonathan Ho	11,140	3.74
Richmond Citizens' Association	Jack Trovato	10,915	3.67
Richmond First	Sunny Ho	8,933	3.00
RITE Richmond	Niti Sharma	8,917	2.99
RITE Richmond	Henry Yao	8,467	2.84
Richmond First	Peter Liu	8,357	2.81
Richmond Community Coalition	Parm Bains	7,973	2.68
Independent	John Roston	7,961	2.67
Richmond Community Coalition	Melissa Zhang	7,708	2.38
Independent	Kerry Starchuk	6,959	2.34
Independent	Jason Tarnow	5,720	1.92
Independent	Adil Awan	4,278	1.44
Independent	Manjit Singh	4,134	1.39
Independent	Dennis Page	3,478	1.17
Independent	Andy Chiang	3,337	1.12
Independent	Theresa Head	3,251	1.09
Independent	Patrick J. Saunders	2,241	0.75
Independent	Zhe Zhang	2,241	0.75
