= Geoff Plant =

Canadian lawyer & politician (born 1955)

Geoff Plant OBC KC

Member of the British Columbia Legislative Assembly for Richmond-Steveston
- In office May 28, 1996 – May 17, 2005
- Preceded by: Allan Warnke
- Succeeded by: John Yap

Attorney General of British Columbia
- In office June 5, 2001 – June 16, 2005
- Premier: Gordon Campbell
- Preceded by: Graeme Bowbrick
- Succeeded by: Wally Oppal

Minister Responsible for Treaty Negotiations of British Columbia
- In office June 5, 2001 – June 16, 2005
- Premier: Gordon Campbell
- Preceded by: Position established
- Succeeded by: Tom Christensen (Aboriginal Relations and Reconciliation)

Personal details
- Born: May 22, 1955 (age 71) Hamilton, Ontario
- Party: Liberal
- Education: Harvard University; University of Southampton; Dalhousie University; University of Cambridge
- Profession: lawyer

Geoff Plant, OBC KC (born May 22, 1955) is a Canadian lawyer and retired politician known for his interest in citizen's legal and electoral rights and aboriginal rights. He was a member of the Legislative Assembly (MLA) of British Columbia, representing Richmond-Steveston from 1996 to 2005. A caucus member of the British Columbia Liberal Party, he served in the cabinet of Premier Gordon Campbell as Attorney General and Minister Responsible for Treaty Negotiations from 2001 to 2005.

== Background and career ==
Born in Hamilton, Ontario and raised in Vancouver, Plant received a B.A. from Harvard University in 1978 and law degrees from the University of Southampton in England in 1980, Dalhousie University in Halifax in 1981, and from the University of Cambridge in 1989. After serving as a clerk in the Supreme Court of Canada in Ottawa for a year, he was called to the British Columbia bar in 1982 and began practising in litigation, focusing on public and aboriginal law.

Plant was one of the eight members of the legal team representing the Attorney General of British Columbia in Delgamuukw v British Columbia, 1991 BCSC 2372. This case was eventually overturned by the Supreme Court of Canada in Delgamuukw v British Columbia, [1997] 3 SCR 1010.

== MLA and Attorney General ==
A resident of Richmond, British Columbia since 1984, Plant received the BC Liberal nomination to contest the riding of Richmond-Steveston in the 1996 provincial election, over the incumbent Allan Warnke. Plant was elected the riding's MLA with 56 per cent of the vote, and served as the opposition critic for justice and intergovernmental relations, as well as Liberal caucus whip. He shared an apartment in Victoria with Gordie Hogg and party leader Gordon Campbell during that time.

Plant was re-elected with 69 per cent of the vote in the 2001 election, and was appointed to the cabinet that June to serve as the Attorney General of British Columbia and Minister responsible for Treaty Negotiations as part of Campbell's first-term government. He oversaw the province-wide British Columbia Treaty Referendum in 2002 and the creation and oversight of the Citizens' Assembly on Electoral Reform. A policy change that affected whether domestic violence complaints would be automatically prosecuted did receive criticism from women's centres and was noted by the United Nations Committee on the Elimination of Discrimination Against Women. Cuts to legal aid prompted the Law Society to censure him. On the issue of polygamy in Bountiful, Plant cited constitutional concerns for religious rights but also formed an investigative team to research the situation.

He was regarded as a moderate within Campbell's centre-right coalition who was keen on reforms for the legal, aboriginal treaty negotiation and electoral systems.

In March 2005, Plant announced his decision not to run for a second term in government at that year's provincial election, citing a wish to spend more time with his wife who was experiencing breast cancer. He encouraged his 2001 campaign chair John Yap to contest the Liberal nomination; Yap went on to serve as MLA for Richmond-Steveston from 2005 to 2020.

== Post-politics ==
Upon his exit from provincial politics, he joined the law firm of Heenan Blaikie while maintaining government appointments as senior advisor in land and resource negotiations with the Council of the Haida Nation. He also taught as a sessional instructor at the University of Victoria Faculty of Law.

In 2006 Plant was appointed as a special advisor to the Premier and Minister of Advanced Education to lead a project called Campus 2020: Looking Ahead, the first comprehensive review of post-secondary education in British Columbia in over 40 years. He made 52 recommendations in his report released in April 2007, including repealing the designation of university college and establishing regional universities; he received $115,000 as compensation.

He was appointed by Vancouver Mayor Sam Sullivan in May 2007 to the newly created position of Civil City Commissioner, a part-time position controlling a budget of $300,000. The position would lead Project Civil City, the mayor's effort to enhance order in Vancouver's public areas by reducing homelessness, aggressive panhandling and the open drug market by at least 50 per cent by 2010. There had been controversy regarding this position, with opposition city councillors Tim Stevenson and Raymond Louie expressing doubt as to its usefulness. His appointment ended in February 2009.

In 2008 he was appointed by Attorney General Wally Oppal to the British Columbia Law Institute to serve a three-year term. He joined the Canada West Foundation's board of directors in 2009, before becoming the board's chair in 2014. From 2010 to 2017, he served as chair of the board for Providence Health Care, the operator of St. Paul's Hospital. He was named the BC government's chief legal strategist at the Enbridge Northern Gateway Pipelines review hearings in September 2012.

In May 2015 he became chancellor of Emily Carr University of Art and Design, serving until 2021. He also served on the BC Ferries board of directors for more than eight years, until being forced to resign in 2019 following the introduction of term limits. As of 2024, he is a counsel with Gall Legge Grant Zwack LLP in Vancouver.

Plant was made a Member of the Order of British Columbia in 2022.

== Personal life ==
Plant was born with a cleft palate and has visible results of corrective surgery. The congenital disorder's effect on his speech was not a barrier to his succeeding in law and politics, two careers that require skillful verbal communication.

He and his wife have two children.

== Electoral record ==
2001 British Columbia general election: Richmond-Steveston
| Party | Candidate | Votes | % | Expenditures |
|---|---|---|---|---|
| Liberal | Geoff Plant | 14,508 | 69.23 | $56,820 |
| New Democratic | Billie Mortimer | 2,564 | 12.24 | $2,734 |
| Green | Kevan Hudson | 2,257 | 10.77 | $1,063 |
| Marijuana | Gordon Mathias | 561 | 2.68 | $705 |
| Unity | Vincent Paul | 381 | 1.82 | $610 |
| Independent | Allan Warnke | 358 | 1.71 | $1,562 |
| Conservative | Barry Edward Chilton | 160 | 0.76 | $240 |
| Reform | Sue Wade | 145 | 0.69 | $610 |
| People's Front | Edith Petersen | 21 | 0.10 | $100 |
| Total valid votes | | 20,955 | 100.00 | |
| Total rejected ballots | | 125 | 0.60 | |
| Turnout | | 21,080 | 73.27 | |
Source: Elections BC

1996 British Columbia general election: Richmond-Steveston
| Party | Candidate | Votes | % | Expenditures |
|---|---|---|---|---|
| Liberal | Geoff Plant | 9,643 | 56.65 | $39,769 |
| New Democratic | Gail Paquette | 5,041 | 29.61 | $32,144 |
| Progressive Democrat | Pat Young | 919 | 5.40 | $550 |
| Reform | Shirley Abraham-Kirk | 556 | 3.27 | $2,765 |
| Independent | Allan Warnke | 450 | 2.64 | $5,795 |
| Green | Brian Gold | 188 | 1.10 | $100 |
| Conservative | Gary L. Cross | 99 | 0.58 | $1,132 |
| Social Credit | Gordon Neuls | 88 | 0.52 | $4,315 |
| Natural Law | Nancy Stewart | 38 | 0.23 | $123 |
| Total valid votes | | 17,022 | 100.00 | |
| Total rejected ballots | | 85 | 0.50 | |
| Turnout | | 17,107 | 74.36 | |
Source: Elections BC
