= Aaron Gunn =

Canadian politician (born 1989/90)

Aaron Gunn MP

Member of Parliament for North Island—Powell River
- Incumbent
- Assumed office April 28, 2025
- Preceded by: Rachel Blaney

Personal details
- Born: 1989 or 1990 (age 36–37)
- Party: Conservative
- Other political affiliations: BC Conservative (since 2022); BC Liberal (until 2021)
- Education: University of Victoria (B.Com.)
- Website: aarongunn.ca

Military service
- Branch/service: Canadian Army
- Rank: Private (Basic)
- Unit: 5th (British Columbia) Field Artillery Regiment, RCA

YouTube information
- Channel: @AaronGunnBC
- Years active: 2018–present
- Subscribers: 100 thousand
- Views: 11.6 million
- Last updated: September 26, 2025
- Website: Campaign website

Aaron Gunn MP (born 1989 or 1990) is a Canadian politician and filmmaker. A member of the Conservative Party, he has served as the Member of Parliament (MP) for North Island—Powell River since the 2025 federal election.

Gunn's campaign drew national attention due to controversy over his remarks on residential schools and Indigenous reconciliation, which were condemned by the British Columbia's First Nations Leadership Council and other indigenous groups. In 2022, he sought the leadership of the British Columbia Liberal Party, but was disqualified.

Gunn first gained public attention through his documentaries, including Vancouver Is Dying and Canada Is Dying, as well as through his political commentary series Politics Explained.

At the time of the 2025 Canadian federal election, he lived in Campbell River, British Columbia.

== Early life and filmmaking ==
Aaron Gunn grew up in Greater Victoria, and became interested in filmmaking as a teenager. He earned a Bachelor of Commerce from the University of Victoria and served in the 5th (British Columbia) Field Artillery Regiment of the Canadian Army Reserve.

After university, Gunn worked for the Canadian Taxpayers Federation, where he developed his communication skills. He later worked for conservative organization Canada Proud, producing approximately 200 two-minute videos on political topics.

Gunn has been producing short- and long-form videos since 2017. His documentary series, Politics Explained, has amassed millions of views across Facebook and YouTube over four seasons. He is among the most followed political figures in Western Canada, with 120,000 followers on Facebook and 100,000 subscribers on YouTube.

Gunn's filmmaking career received significant attention in 2022 with the release of Vancouver Is Dying, an hour-long documentary about crime, homelessness, and the opioid overdose crisis in Vancouver. Released on October 5, 2022, the film received more than two million views on YouTube within a month of its release.

Some commentators have speculated that the film contributed to then-mayor Kennedy Stewart's defeat in the 2022 municipal election, and Stewart himself later stated that the film contributed to his loss. Critics of the documentary have argued that it misrepresents addiction and drug policy and contributes to the stigmatization of marginalized groups. As of May 2026, the film had received 4.5 million views on YouTube.

In 2023, Gunn released Canada Is Dying, a sequel that received over one million views on YouTube.

== Political beginnings ==
In October 2021, Gunn announced he was seeking the leadership of the BC Liberal Party (now BC United). However, he was disqualified from the 2022 British Columbia Liberal Party leadership election after the party stated that his views conflicted with its commitments to diversity and reconciliation.

Following his disqualification, Gunn founded Common Sense BC, an advocacy group to explore the viability of a right-wing alternative to the BC Liberals. Common Sense endorsed a slate of candidates who stood for election to the Conservative Party of British Columbia board of directors at the May 2022 annual general meeting. The endorsed candidates, including conservative strategist Angelo Isidorou, were elected, marking a significant shift in the party's leadership. In August 2022, the party underwent a rebranding effort that included the adoption of a new logo, policy platform, and website, with Gunn playing an influential role in the process. Isidorou went on to serve as executive director and provincial campaign manager in the 2024 British Columbia general election.

During the 2024 provincial election, a resurgence of the BC Conservatives coincided with the collapse of BC United and resulted in the party attaining official opposition status in the Legislative Assembly of British Columbia. The party's rapid transformation over a two-year period—from holding no seats in the legislature to forming the official opposition has been partly attributed to Gunn's involvement.

== Member of Parliament ==
Gunn received the federal Conservative Party nomination in December 2023 for the riding of North Island—Powell River. His candidacy came under scrutiny during the 2025 federal election for his previous social media posts about Canada's residential school system, including controversial remarks where he claimed Indigenous groups in Ontario had "asked for" residential schools and that the word "genocide" did not reflect the reality of the residential school system. In 2020, Gunn tweeted: "There was no genocide. Stop lying to people and read a book". He continued to make statements of this nature in 2021 when he described residential schools as "much-maligned". These comments were condemned by the British Columbia's First Nations Leadership Council and the Union of British Columbia Indian Chiefs. Indigenous groups protested at Gunn's campaign office. An online petition calling for his removal as a candidate because of those comments received over 15,000 signatures.

Conservative Party leader Pierre Poilievre stood by Gunn, despite calls to have him removed. Poilievre called the claims that Gunn had denied the impact of residential schools "false" and "misinformation". Gunn did not speak for himself on the issue, but Poilievre asserted that "[Gunn] has said that he wants to continue to condemn the residential schools and build stronger partnerships with First Nations people to unlock our resources so that we can produce incredible paycheques and opportunities for First Nations communities".

In September 2025, Gunn was interviewed by Aaron Pete, a First Nations chief in Chilliwack. When asked about his prior comments on residential schools, Gunn emphasized the importance of using precise language. He stated that while residential schools were "horrible, regrettable", and caused generational trauma, this did not automatically meet the definition of genocide. Instead, Gunn argued that the term "cultural genocide" was more accurate, aligning with terminology used in the Truth and Reconciliation Commission's reports.

Gunn has publicly opposed the B.C. Northern Shelf Marine Protected Area (MPA) Network (better known as the Great Bear Sea MPA Network). The conservation project has involved nearly 20 years of negotiations with over a dozen coastal First Nations, the province of British Columbia, and the federal government. The scope of the MPA was decided through consultation with 17 First Nation leaders who have been involved in identifying the key conservation areas in their territories, as well as biologists, provincial marine planners and Fisheries and Oceans Canada staff. Gunn produced a video titled "No Fishing Allowed: Trudeau's plan to decimate an entire industry", arguing the MPA is without scientific merit and politically motivated move by former Prime Minister Justin Trudeau to end commercial and recreational fishing. Gunn asserts the MPA is solely the "agenda of radical environmentalists".

Gunn was elected in the 2025 federal election, receiving 38.8% of the vote, flipping the seat from the New Democratic Party (NDP). The election discussion largely revolved around Gunn, as both the NDP and Liberal Party candidates defined their candidacies in opposition to his. The surge in the Liberal Party vote potentially split the vote and contributed to his win.

In interviews after his win, MP-elect Gunn emphasized that voters were concerned about jobs, crime, and the drug crisis. He noted many in his district are tired of losing high-paying jobs and having to work out of province.

On June 16, 2025, Gunn was appointed to the Standing Committee for Fisheries and Oceans.

Following John Rustad's resignation on December 4, 2025, Gunn was widely described as a potential successor and emerged as an early frontrunner in the subsequent leadership race for the Conservative Party of British Columbia. A December 2025 survey conducted by Mainstreet Research reported that Gunn led other prospective candidates by double-digit margins, identifying him as the leading contender in the leadership contest at that time. However, on December 24, 2025, Gunn declined to run in the leadership election.

On June 30, 2026, Gunn was appointed to the Conservative shadow cabinet, replacing Michael Barrett as the critic for ethics and accountable government.

== Political positions ==
Gunn describes himself as a "small-c" conservative.

=== Free speech ===
Gunn has been outspoken about the importance of free speech. Most notably, Gunn released a nearly hour-long documentary entitled The End of Free Speech in Canada, which explores the effects of censorship in Canada.

More recently, he spoke at the House of Commons Standing Committee on Justice and Human Rights (JUST) regarding Bill C-9: An Act to amend the Criminal Code (hate propaganda, hate crime and access to religious or cultural places), questioning the motives behind the proposed legislation.

=== Fisheries and oceans ===
Gunn currently serves as a member of the House of Commons Standing Committee on Fisheries and Oceans. Gunn is a supporter of the fisheries industry on the British Columbia coast and passed a committee study motion to investigate the Draft Salmon Aquaculture Transition Plan for British Columbia and the Government of Canada’s proposed phase-out of the sector by 2029.

He has also been a critic of Marine Protected Areas (MPAs) and the Government of Canada’s target to protect 30% of Canada’s oceans by 2030.

=== Drugs and crime ===
In his maiden speech in the House of Commons, Gunn criticized several crime-related bills passed under Prime Minister Justin Trudeau’s government, including Bills C-75 and C-5, which he argued have contributed to an increase in repeat violent offenders.

Gunn has also expressed opposition to safe-supply drug policies and has advocated for abstinence-based recovery programs, themes he previously highlighted in his documentary work. His documentaries include Vancouver Is Dying and Canada Is Dying.

=== Forestry ===
Gunn has been an advocate for the forestry industry in British Columbia.

In September 2025, Gunn authored an open letter addressed to Prime Minister Mark Carney and British Columbia Premier David Eby, which was co-signed by North Island MLA Anna Kindy and eight mayors from his riding. The letter stated that the coastal forestry industry was in crisis and warned that the situation would deteriorate without urgent policy changes.

In the letter, Gunn called on the federal and provincial governments to expedite permits, restore legal certainty, and support a predictable fibre supply.

=== Powell River dams electricity exportation ===
Gunn has stated that Canadian natural resources should “first benefit Canadians before anyone else.”

On October 29, 2025, Gunn tabled a petition in the House of Commons on behalf of constituents in North Island–Powell River opposing Powell River Energy Inc.’s application to the Canadian Energy Regulator for a 30-year electricity export licence to the United States.

=== Diversity practices in the military ===
Gunn opposes diversity hiring in the Canadian military, stating that it constitutes discrimination against white males. As of 2025, the Canadian military is 70% white and male.

=== Gender issues ===
Gunn believes that there are two genders and that the "gender pay gap doesn't exist".

=== Abortion ===
Anti-abortion group Campaign Life Coalition rated Gunn with an approving "green light". Gunn has never publicly commented on abortion.

=== Opioid crisis ===
Gunn opposes safe supply and decriminalizing hard drugs, stating that their implementation has been a "terrible disaster" in Canada. He says that treatment and recovery should be prioritized.

=== Russia ===
Gunn posted about Russian president Vladimir Putin approvingly on social media in 2014. He also suggested that Russia would have faced less international scrutiny for its anti-LGBT law if it had taken what he described as the "politically prudent" approach of broadly restricting free expression, as China had done during the 2008 Beijing Olympics. These comments resurfaced in 2025, when he was running for MP. He recanted his old statements, calling them "foolish".

== Electoral record ==
2025 Canadian federal election: North Island—Powell River
Party	Candidate	Votes	%	±%	Expenditures
Conservative	Aaron Gunn	31,356	38.75	+2.53	$174,523.26
New Democratic	Tanille Johnston	26,357	32.57	–6.89	$149,343.37
Liberal	Jennifer Lash	21,218	26.22	+12.92	$72,254.69
Green	Jessica Wegg	1,505	1.86	–4.00	$21,230.01
People's	Paul Macknight	341	0.42	–4.14	$331.30
Independent	Glen Staples	152	0.19	–	none listed
Total valid votes/expense limit		80,929	99.62	–	$182,182.83
Total rejected ballots		311	0.38		
Turnout		81,240	73.84		
Eligible voters		110,017			
Conservative notional gain from New Democratic		Swing		+4.71	
Source: Elections Canada
