= John Yap =

Canadian politician (born 1959)

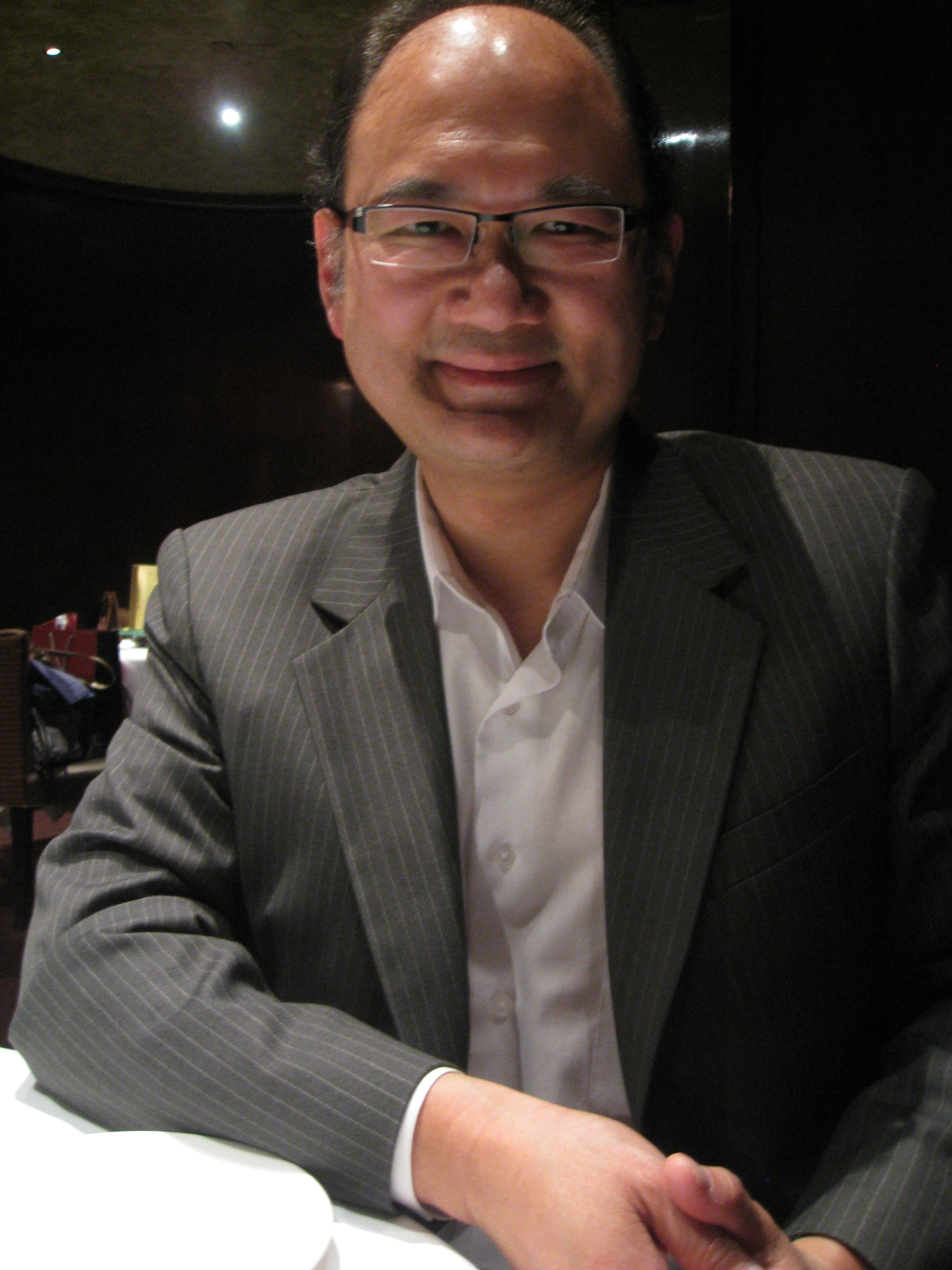

Member of the British Columbia Legislative Assembly for Richmond-Steveston
- In office May 17, 2005 – November 24, 2020
- Preceded by: Geoff Plant
- Succeeded by: Kelly Greene

Minister of Advanced Education, Innovation and Technology of British Columbia
- In office September 5, 2012 – March 4, 2013
- Premier: Christy Clark
- Preceded by: Naomi Yamamoto (Advanced Education); Pat Bell (Innovation)
- Succeeded by: Ralph Sultan

Minister of State for Multiculturalism of British Columbia
- In office March 24, 2012 – March 4, 2013
- Premier: Christy Clark
- Preceded by: Harry Bloy
- Succeeded by: Ralph Sultan

Parliamentary Secretary for Clean Technology to the Minister of Energy and Mines of British Columbia
- In office March 14, 2011 – March 24, 2012
- Premier: Christy Clark

Minister of State for Climate Action of British Columbia
- In office June 10, 2009 – March 14, 2011
- Premier: Gordon Campbell
- Preceded by: Barry Penner
- Succeeded by: Position abolished

Personal details
- Born: October 28, 1959 (age 67) Singapore
- Party: BC United
- Education: University of British Columbia
- Profession: banker; financial planner; politician

John Yap (Chinese: 葉志明; pinyin: Yè Zhìmíng; Pe̍h-ōe-jī: Ia̍p Chì-bêng; born 1959) is a Canadian politician and former banker. He represented the electoral district of Richmond-Steveston in the Legislative Assembly of British Columbia from 2005 to 2020, as part of the BC Liberal caucus. During his time in government, he served as Minister of State for Climate Action, Minister Responsible for Multiculturalism, and Minister of Advanced Education, Innovation and Technology in the cabinets of premiers Gordon Campbell and Christy Clark.

== Personal life and family ==
Of Hokkien descent, John Yap was born in Singapore to a homemaker mother and a medical doctor father. He speaks some Mandarin and Cantonese. The family immigrated to Canada, settling in Richmond, British Columbia in 1986. He attended the University of British Columbia, graduating with a Bachelor of Science degree in 1980 and a Master of Business Administration degree in 1983. He went on to lead a twenty-year career in banking with Toronto-Dominion Bank and financial planning with the Investors Group.

Yap is a member and past president (1999–2000) of the Richmond Sunset Rotary Club and an honorary member of the Vancouver Diamond Lions Club. He was heavily involved with the Gilmore Park United Church and the Gilmore Gardens Seniors Centre.

Yap is married with two grown children, a son and a daughter. For the past two decades, he and his family have resided in Richmond. In December 2014, he received heart bypass surgery at Vancouver General Hospital.

Yap has visited his ancestral village in Yongchun, Fujian.

== Political career ==
In the Richmond-Steveston riding, Yap had worked on Geoff Plant's 1996 election campaign and volunteered as Plant's campaign chairman in the 2001 election. After Plant announced his retirement, Yap sought the BC Liberal nomination in Richmond-Steveston for the upcoming 2005 election. Plant vocally supported Yap's candidacy and Yap was acclaimed uncontested.

=== 38th Parliament ===
In the 38th Provincial General Election, held on May 17, 2005, Yap was elected to the 38th Parliament of British Columbia. He defeated three other candidates in the Richmond-Steveston riding: Employment-agency owner and New Democratic Party of British Columbia (BC NDP) candidate Kay Hale, Green Party candidate Egidio Spinelli and Democratic Reform BC candidate Daniel Ferguson. As a Member of the Legislative Assembly in the 38th Parliament, Yap was a member of the Treasury Board and served on several committees: the Legislative Review Cabinet Committee, and the Special Committee on Sustainable Aquaculture and the Select Standing Committees of Public Accounts, Crown Corporations, and Finance and Government Services. In September 2006 Yap was elected by his peers to be the Chair of the BC Government Caucus.

On July 1, 2008, Yap implemented the British Columbia revenue carbon tax to fuels such as gasoline, diesel, natural gas, heating fuel, propane and coal, and to peat and tires when used to produce energy or heat. Carbon tax revenue is returned to taxpayers through tax reductions and is not used to fund government programs. The refundable Low Income Climate Action Tax Credit ensures that low-income individuals and families are compensated for the tax. This legislation was supplemented by a $100 Climate Action Dividend that was distributed to all British Columbians in 2008.

Yap began a non-partisan program called the Youth Outreach Initiative Program (YOI) in 2008 to encourage youth involvement in the political process. The purpose of the YOI is to bridge the gap between the youth and the government. At Robert Cecil Palmer Secondary's Richmond School District's Student Leadership Conference (RSLC), Yap and his youth presenter educate and discuss issues such as lowering voting age to 16, mandatory voting laws, electronic voting options and increase classroom education.

=== 39th Parliament ===
In the 39th Provincial General Election, held on May 12, 2009, Yap was re-elected, defeating three other candidates: NDP candidate and retired medical transcriptionist Sue Wallis, Green Party candidate Jeff Hill and former BC Conservative Party leader Barry Chilton.

==== Minister of State for Climate Action ====
On June 10, 2009, British Columbia Premier Gordon Campbell promoted Yap to the Executive Council of British Columbia as the Minister of State for Climate Action. Yap was responsible for implementing British Columbia's Climate Action Plan and overseeing B.C.'s legislated carbon emissions reduction target of 33% by 2020. Regarding climate action initiatives, Yap worked to ensure the 2010 Winter Olympics and Paralympics were carbon neutral, and with various ministries he helped supervise the public sector's transition to carbon neutrality, increases in provincial fuel taxes (based on the fuel's carbon content), the creation of a Crown corporation to administer B.C.-specific carbon off-sets (the Pacific Carbon Trust), a memorandum of understanding with the California Air Resources Board regarding auto emission standards, expanded recycling initiatives, and a cap and trade system through the Western Climate Initiative. Yap also signed agreements with Washington Department of Ecology Director Ted Sturdevant on limiting carbon emissions from government operations and promoting awareness of the impacts of sea level rise on coastal areas. On February 7, 2011, Yap and Terasen Gas provided $6.9 million for 35 energy projects in ten school districts to help reduce greenhouse gas emissions, energy consumption and costs through British Columbia's Energy Conservation Agreement Fund. In addition, Yap supported the $15-million, three-year LiveSmart BC for small businesses across B.C. to access free energy-efficiency advice, equipment and incentives. "This program will allow thousands of B.C. small businesses to save money and reduce their energy consumption," Yap said. "We know small businesses are the backbone of the economy and together we can work towards our climate action goals."

Yap supported the first Public Sector Energy Conservation Agreement in 2009 (PSECA) as a partnership between BC Hydro and the Government of British Columbia. This agreement achieved annual energy cost savings of close to $7.4 million, GHG reductions of over 18,700 tonnes and conservation of 38.6 GWh of electricity.

Yap was retained as Minister of State for Climate Action during Gordon Campbell's final cabinet shuffle in October 2010. He supported the province's move towards the Harmonized Sales Tax. Yap also supported the Premier's initiative in income tax reduction to the first $72,000 of income, effective January 1, 2011.

In the 2011 BC Liberal Party leadership election Yap endorsed Kevin Falcon, though Christy Clark eventually won.

==== Parliamentary Secretary for Clean Technology ====
On March 14, 2011, Yap was appointed Parliamentary Secretary for Clean Technology to the Minister of Energy and Mines. During this time, Yap consulted with British Columbia's major fuel suppliers and reviewed low-carbon transportation fuel options to improve low carbon fuel requirements. In response to the concerns on the price and availability of high-quality renewable diesel for use in cold weather, Yap relaxed the renewable and low carbon fuel requirements legislation which saved 418,919 tonnes of greenhouse gas emissions from being released into the environment in 2010. In July 2011 Yap chaired the Bio-Economy Committee to identify ways to expand British Columbia's bio-economy through engagement with the industry and academia. As a part of that role, the provincial government provided $700,000 to FPInnovations to gauge the extent of British Columbia's bio-economy, and help industry identify cost-effective fiber available for new projects, including areas affected by the mountain pine beetle.

"This research funding is an example of the timely action our committee has recommended government take to develop a stronger and more robust bio-economy for British Columbians.". - John Yap, MLA for Richmond-Steveston

==== Immigration Task Force ====
On December 8, 2011, Premier Christy Clark formed The British Columbia Immigration Task Force and appointed Yap as chair. The purpose of the ITF was to "review key government programs to increase the number of skilled immigrants and investors in British Columbia." The ITF report, delivered to Premier Christy Clark on March 31, 2012, was composed of the findings of eight British Columbia-wide regional consultations. Industry officials, stakeholders, and the general public were asked to provide their viewpoints, suggestions, and expertise in regards to the challenge of attracting skilled immigrants to BC. The ITF report listed 10 major recommendations, including:

- Immediately increase immigration levels to B.C.
- Grow and expand the BC Provincial Nominee Program (BC PNP) as the most effective way of supporting regional economic development.
- Ensure economic immigration program application processes and requirements are as straightforward and efficient as possible and reflect business realities for employers.
- Capitalize on B.C. as a destination of choice for entrepreneurs and investors.
- Provide timely, effective information and support to newcomers and employers.

Ultimately, the task force found that if BC fails to attract more skilled immigrants, businesses will be adversely affected through relocations or closures, in turn harming BC's economic outlook. As chairperson of the ITF, Yap provided a quote on his experiences and findings: "Travelling across the province, hearing stories from a range of employers about the challenges they are facing filling jobs in all types of industries impressed upon the task force the immediate and overwhelming need to bring more skilled immigrants to B.C. through a more efficient and responsive system."

==== Other portfolios, resignation from cabinet ====
John Yap was named Minister of State for Multiculturalism in March 2012, replacing Harry Bloy, who resigned from cabinet. The post was retitled Minister Responsible for Multiculturalism on September 5, 2012; on the same date he was also appointed Minister of Advanced Education, Innovation and Technology.

Yap resigned from Cabinet on March 4, 2013, as a government investigation took place regarding an outreach scandal targeting ethnic communities. The scandal erupted over the leaking of a document, created using taxpayer resources, to attract ethnic voters to the BC Liberals in hopes of winning key ridings in the May 14, 2013, provincial election. Despite his association in the scandal, Yap announced that he would be running in the provincial election.

=== 40th Parliament ===
In the 40th Provincial General election, held on May 14, 2013, Yap was re-elected, defeating several candidates: NDP candidate Scott Stewart, Conservative candidate Carol Day, Green Party candidate Jerome James Dickey, and UCBP candidate Mike Donovan. However, his vote share dropped to 51% from 61% in 2009.

In July 2013, John Yap was appointed Parliamentary Secretary to the Minister of Justice and Attorney General for Liquor Policy Reform. He was also appointed to the Cabinet Committee for a Strong Economy and the committee for Legislative Review, and was named Chair of a new Special Committee to Appoint an Auditor General.

=== 41st Parliament ===
He won re-election in 2017 against NDP candidate Kelly Greene. The Liberals won the largest number of seats on election night but not enough to form a majority government, leading to the party's defeat on a confidence vote on June 29, 2017. Yap was named opposition critic for liquor, gaming and Insurance Corporation of British Columbia in August 2017, before assuming the arts and culture portfolio in September 2020.

He declined to run again in the 2020 election.

== Electoral history ==
2017 British Columbia general election: Richmond-Steveston
| Party | Candidate | Votes | % | ±% | Expenditures |
|---|---|---|---|---|---|
| Liberal | John Yap | 10,332 | 47.60 | −4.07 | $63,896 |
| New Democratic | Kelly Greene | 8,542 | 39.35 | +11.28 | $21,429 |
| Green | Roy Sakata | 2,833 | 13.05 | +4.91 | $2,449 |
| Total valid votes | | 21,707 | 100.00 | – | |
| Total rejected ballots | | 192 | 0.88 | +0.22 | |
| Turnout | | 21,899 | 62.77 | +7.38 | |
| Registered voters | | 34,889 | | | |
| Liberal hold | | Swing | | −7.68 | |
Source: Elections BC

2013 British Columbia general election: Richmond-Steveston
| Party | Candidate | Votes | % | ±% | Expenditures |
|---|---|---|---|---|---|
| Liberal | John Yap | 12063 | 51.67 | -9.33 | $154,933 |
| New Democratic | Scott Stewart | 6553 | 28.07 | +1.07 | $19,284 |
| Conservative | Carol Day | 2662 | 11.40 | +6.4 | $8,744 |
| Green | Jerome James Dickey | 1904 | 8.15 | +1.15 | $3,559 |
| Unparty | Mike Donovan | 166 | 0.71 | – | $1,055 |
| Total valid votes | | 23431 | 100.00 | | |
| Total rejected ballots | | 155 | 0.66 | | |
| Turnout | | 23586 | 55.39 | | |
Source: Elections BC

2009 British Columbia general election: Richmond-Steveston
| Party | Candidate | Votes | % | ±% | Expenditures |
|---|---|---|---|---|---|
| Liberal | John Yap | 13,168 | 61 | +2 | $109,468 |
| New Democratic | Sue Wallis | 5,925 | 27 | −4 | $17,718 |
| Green | Jeff Hill | 1,491 | 7 | −1 | $350 |
| Conservative | Barry Chilton | 1,082 | 5 | – | $450 |
| Total valid votes | | 21,666 | 100 | | |
| Total rejected ballots | | 167 | 0.76 | | |
| Turnout | | 21,833 | 52 | | |

2005 British Columbia general election: Richmond-Steveston
| Party | Candidate | Votes | % | Expenditures |
|---|---|---|---|---|
| Liberal | John Yap | 13,859 | 59.20 | $90,951 |
| New Democratic | Kay Hale | 7,334 | 31.33 | $8,858 |
| Green | Egidio Spinelli | 1,934 | 8.27 | $731 |
| Democratic Reform | Daniel Stuart Ferguson | 282 | 1.20 | $247 |
| Total valid votes | | 23,409 | 100 | |
| Total rejected ballots | | 152 | 0.65 | |
| Turnout | | 23,561 | 59.87 | |
