= Gordon Zhang =

Canadian politician

Gordon Zhang MLA

Member of the British Columbia Legislative Assembly for Richmond-Steveston
- Incumbent
- Assumed office October 24, 2026
- Preceded by: Kelly Greene

Personal details
- Party: Conservative

Gordon Zhang MLA is a Canadian politician who is the Member of the British Columbia Legislative Assembly for Richmond-Steveston since 2026.

Zhang is a business professor at Kwantlen Polytechnic University. During the COVID-19 pandemic, he established one of Canada's first N95 respirator production lines in Richmond, which supplied the Canadian Olympic delegation at the 2020 Summer Olympics.

Zhang is also the founder of the Grizzly Bear Institute of Canada, a nonprofit whose mission is to “commission and publish research and policy analysis in economics, natural resources, political science, public administration and international affairs.” The institute, founded in 2017, is accused of having ties to China, though Zhang left the Institute in 2020.

== Electoral record ==
2026 British Columbia general election: Richmond-Steveston
Party	Candidate	Votes	%	±%	Expenditures
Conservative	Gordon Zhang	11,665	54.07		
New Democratic	Bruce Kong	7,543	34.96		
CentreBC	Barry Wosk	1,696	7.86	—	
Independent	Robert Evans	470	2.18	—	
CanWest	Keenan Yang	142	0.66	—	
Total valid votes/expenses limit		21,516	99.73		
Total rejected ballots		58	0.27		
Turnout		21,574	—		
Registered voters					
Conservative gain from New Democratic		Swing		+10.61	
Source: Elections BC
