= Comox—Powell River =

Former federal electoral district in British Columbia, Canada

British Columbia electoral district

Defunct federal electoral district
- Legislature: House of Commons
- District created: 1979
- District abolished: 1988
- First contested: 1979
- Last contested: 1984

Comox—Powell River was a federal electoral district in British Columbia, Canada, that was represented in the House of Commons of Canada from 1979 to 1988. This riding was created in 1976 from parts of Coast Chilcotin, Comox–Alberni and Skeena ridings.

It was abolished in 1987 when it was redistributed into Comox—Alberni and North Island—Powell River ridings.

It consisted of

- the Mount Waddington Regional District;
- the Powell River Regional District, except Lasqueti Island and the adjacent smaller islands;
- the Comox–Strathcona Regional District;
- the Central Coast Regional District;
- the southern part of the Kitimat-Stikine Regional District, i.e., the part lying south of a line drawn from east to west along Finlayson Channel, Sarah Passage, Tolmie Channel, Meyers Passage and Laredo Sound; and
- the Sunshine Coast Regional District.

== Members of Parliament ==
Parliament	Years	Member	Party
Riding created from Coast Chilcotin, Comox—Alberni and Skeena
31st	1979–1980	Ray Skelly	New Democratic
32nd	1980–1984	Ray Skelly	New Democratic
33rd	1984–1988	Ray Skelly	New Democratic
Riding dissolved into Comox—Alberni and North Island—Powell River

== Election results ==
=== 1984 ===
1984 Canadian federal election
Party	Candidate	Votes	%	±%
New Democratic	Ray Skelly	27,288	44.61	–4.36
Progressive Conservative	Mike Hicks	26,566	43.43	+11.03
Liberal	Wayne Nesbitt	5,790	9.47	–8.59
Green	Wayne D. White	505	0.83	–
Confederation of Regions	Allan W. Griffiths	452	0.74	–
Social Credit	Rob Higgin	357	0.58	–
Communist	Sy Pederson	215	0.35	–0.22
Total valid votes		61,173	99.76	
Total rejected ballots		148	0.24	+0.03
Turnout		61,321	77.02	+8.11
Eligible voters		79,613		
New Democratic hold		Swing		–7.70
Source: Elections Canada

=== 1980 ===
1980 Canadian federal election
Party	Candidate	Votes	%	±%
New Democratic	Ray Skelly	25,007	48.97	+4.69
Progressive Conservative	Al Lazerte	16,545	32.40	–2.81
Liberal	Shirley McLoughlin	9,221	18.06	–1.82
Communist	Sy Pederson	292	0.57	–0.06
Total valid votes		51,065	99.79	
Total rejected ballots		110	0.21	+0.06
Turnout		51,175	68.92	–2.18
Eligible voters		74,254		
New Democratic hold		Swing		+3.75
Source: Elections Canada

=== 1979 ===
1979 Canadian federal election
Party	Candidate	Votes	%	±%
New Democratic	Ray Skelly	22,075	44.28	–
Progressive Conservative	Al Lazerte	17,556	35.21	–
Liberal	Jack Pearsall	9,910	19.88	–
Communist	Sy Pederson	314	0.63	–
Total valid votes		49,855	99.84	
Total rejected ballots		79	0.16	–
Turnout		49,934	71.10	–
Eligible voters		70,229		
New Democratic notional gain from Liberal		Swing		–
This riding was created from parts of Coast Chilcotin, Comox—Alberni and Skeena, which each elected a Liberal candidate in the previous election. Jack Pearsall was the incumbent from Coast Chilcotin.
Source: Elections Canada

== See also ==
- List of Canadian electoral districts
- Historical federal electoral districts of Canada
