= Philip Mayfield =

Canadian politician

Philip William Mayfield (born 7 November 1937) is a retired politician who was a member of the House of Commons of Canada from 1993 to 2004. He was previously a minister in the United Church of Canada.

Mayfield was elected in Cariboo—Chilcotin electoral district for the Reform Party in 1993. He was re-elected in 1997 and 2000 thus serving in the 35th, 36th and 37th Canadian Parliaments.

He retired from politics in 2004 after completing his third term in federal office.
