= Lorne Greenaway =

Canadian politician

Member of Parliament for Cariboo—Chilcotin
- In office 1979–1988
- Preceded by: riding created
- Succeeded by: Dave Worthy

Personal details
- Born: Lorne Everett Greenaway; 8 May 1933 Bella Coola, British Columbia
- Died: 13 September 2010 (aged 77) Victoria, British Columbia
- Party: Progressive Conservative
- Spouse: Phyl
- Profession: Rancher, Veterinarian

Lorne Everett Greenaway (8 May 1933 – 13 September 2010) was a Progressive Conservative party member of the House of Commons of Canada. He was a rancher and veterinarian by career.

Greenaway was born in Bella Coola, British Columbia in 1933. In 1952, he graduated from Kelowna Senior Secondary School and went on to attend Ontario Veterinary College in Guelph, Ontario, where he graduated at the top of his class and served as class president.

Greenway went on to establish a small and large animal practice in Kamloops that served many of the farms in the area. In 1968, he served as an associate professor at the Western College of Veterinary Medicine in Saskatoon, Saskatchewan for one year before returning to British Columbia. Upon his return, he delved into ranching in the Kelowna and Williams Lake areas. In 1974, he and his family moved to Southlands in Vancouver where he established a small veterinary practice in Steveston.

Greenaway's initial attempt to enter federal politics was unsuccessful, as he was defeated in the Coast Chilcotin electoral district in the 1974 federal election. Greenaway was successful at the Cariboo—Chilcotin electoral district in the 1979 election and won re-election there in the 1980 and 1984 elections. After serving in the 31st, 32nd and 33rd Canadian Parliaments, he left federal politics in 1988 and did not run for another term of office.

After leaving elected office, Greenaway continued to serve in the public sector as a Deputy Minister of Agriculture, Food, and Fisheries and as the Chair of the British Columbia Land Commission. He later represented the federal government as one of the first Commissioners on the British Columbia Treaty Commission.

On 13 September 2010, Greenaway died in Victoria after long period suffering from amyotrophic lateral sclerosis.
