= Cariboo—Chilcotin =

Former federal electoral district in British Columbia, Canada

British Columbia electoral district

Defunct federal electoral district
- Legislature: House of Commons
- District created: 1976
- District abolished: 2003
- First contested: 1979
- Last contested: 2000

Cariboo—Chilcotin was a federal electoral district in British Columbia, Canada, that was represented in the House of Commons from 1979 to 2003.

== Geography ==
It consisted initially of:

- the Cariboo Regional District;
- the Squamish–Lillooet Regional District; and
- the part of the Thompson–Nicola Regional District west of Electoral Areas C, J, M and N.

In 1987, it was redefined to consist of:

- the Cariboo Regional District;
- the part of the Thompson–Nicola Regional District lying to the west of the east boundaries of Electoral Area E and I;
- Electoral Areas A and B of the Squamish–Lillooet Regional District; and
- the Village of Lillooet.

In 1996, it was redefined to consist of:

- Cariboo Regional District;
- Subdivision D of Thompson–Nicola Regional District, including Spatsum Indian Reserve No. 11, excepting: Logan Lake District Municipality; Skeetchestn Indian Reserve and Nooaitch Indian Reserve No. 10;
- Subdivision A of Squamish–Lillooet Regional District, excepting Nequatque Indian Reserve No. 1;
- the southeast part of Central Coast Regional District.

== History ==
This riding was created in 1976 from parts of Coast Chilcotin, Fraser Valley East, Kamloops–Cariboo and Skeena ridings.

This district was eliminated as a result of redistribution in 2003. Parts of it went to Cariboo–Prince George, Kamloops–Thompson and Chilliwack–Fraser Canyon ridings.

== Members of Parliament ==
Parliament	Years	Member	Party
Riding created from Coast Chilcotin, Fraser Valley East, Kamloops—Cariboo and Skeena
31st	1979–1980	Lorne Greenaway	Progressive Conservative
32nd	1980–1984	Lorne Greenaway	Progressive Conservative
33rd	1984–1988	Lorne Greenaway	Progressive Conservative
34th	1988–1993	Dave Worthy	Progressive Conservative
35th	1993–1997	Philip Mayfield	Reform
36th	1997–2000	Philip Mayfield	Reform
36th	2000–2000	Philip Mayfield	Alliance
37th	2000–2003	Philip Mayfield	Alliance
37th	2003–2004	Philip Mayfield	Conservative
Riding dissolved into Cariboo—Prince George, Kamloops—Thompson and Chilliwack—Fraser Canyon

== Election results ==
2000 Canadian federal election
Party	Candidate	Votes	%	±%	Expenditures
Alliance	Philip Mayfield	19,213	59.63	+8.52	$46,481
Liberal	John McCarvill	6,555	20.35	–0.39	$11,178
New Democratic	Ray Skelly	2,915	9.05	–5.02	$5,781
Progressive Conservative	Pamela J. Culbert	2,822	8.76	–3.08	$5,050
Independent	William Turkel	591	1.83	–	$2,627
Marxist–Leninist	Al Charlebois	124	0.39	–	$101
Total valid votes		32,220	99.68		
Total rejected ballots		104	0.32	–0.12	
Turnout		32,324	60.49	–0.48	
Eligible voters		53,434			
Alliance hold		Swing		+6.77	
Source: Elections Canada

1997 Canadian federal election
Party	Candidate	Votes	%	±%	Expenditures
Reform	Philip Mayfield	16,008	51.11	+14.67	$47,376
Liberal	Gurbux Saini	6,493	20.73	–6.06	$67,327
New Democratic	Terry Tate	4,406	14.07	+3.66	$16,049
Progressive Conservative	Peter S. Culbert	3,707	11.84	–10.48	$31,399
Green	Charles Jones	707	2.26	+1.61	$206
Total valid votes		31,321	99.56		
Total rejected ballots		138	0.44	+0.04	
Turnout		31,459	60.98	–3.80	
Eligible voters		51,593			
Reform hold		Swing		+10.36	
Source: Elections Canada

1993 Canadian federal election
Party	Candidate	Votes	%	±%
Reform	Philip Mayfield	11,510	36.44	+34.75
Liberal	Barry Lorne Nordin	8,461	26.79	+1.69
Progressive Conservative	Dave Worthy	7,050	22.32	–14.36
New Democratic	Gillian MacDonald	3,286	10.40	–25.42
National	Richard Lawrence Bennett	537	1.70	–
Canada Party	Bob Hampton	315	1.00	–
Natural Law	Teresa Gillen	222	0.70	–
Green	Donald Stuart Rennie	206	0.65	–
Total valid votes		31,587	99.61	
Total rejected ballots		125	0.39	+0.15
Turnout		31,712	64.77	–10.15
Eligible voters		48,958		
Reform gain from Progressive Conservative		Swing		+24.56
Source: Elections Canada

1988 Canadian federal election
Party	Candidate	Votes	%	±%
Progressive Conservative	Dave Worthy	11,525	36.68	–17.83
New Democratic	Jack Langford	11,256	35.82	+5.21
Liberal	Donald C.L. Ursaki	7,886	25.10	+12.15
Reform	Diane Johnson	530	1.69	–
Rhinoceros	William G. Crombie	224	0.71	–
Total valid votes		31,421	99.76	
Total rejected ballots		76	0.24	+0.00
Turnout		31,497	74.92	+2.02
Eligible voters		42,041		
Progressive Conservative hold		Swing		–11.52
Source: Elections Canada

1984 Canadian federal election
Party	Candidate	Votes	%	±%
Progressive Conservative	Lorne Greenaway	20,553	54.51	+13.76
New Democratic	Christine Slater	11,544	30.62	–3.33
Liberal	Mark Angus	4,881	12.95	–12.05
Green	Lisa Enquist	392	1.04	–
Social Credit	George H. Janzen	335	0.89	–
Total valid votes		37,705	99.76	
Total rejected ballots		91	0.24	–0.05
Turnout		37,796	72.90	+7.75
Eligible voters		51,848		
Progressive Conservative hold		Swing		+8.54
Source: Elections Canada

1980 Canadian federal election
Party	Candidate	Votes	%	±%
Progressive Conservative	Lorne Greenaway	12,355	40.75	–1.97
New Democratic	Harry Olaussen	10,292	33.95	+6.26
Liberal	Larry Ozero	7,577	24.99	–0.03
Marxist–Leninist	Harbans Riarh	92	0.30	–
Total valid votes		30,316	99.71	
Total rejected ballots		89	0.29	+0.05
Turnout		30,405	65.15	–3.60
Eligible voters		46,668		
Progressive Conservative hold		Swing		–4.12
Source: Elections Canada

1979 Canadian federal election
Party	Candidate	Votes	%	±%
Progressive Conservative	Lorne Greenaway	12,767	42.73	–
New Democratic	Harry Olaussen	8,273	27.69	–
Liberal	Lon Godfrey	7,477	25.02	–
Social Credit	Peter Robert Gook	1,363	4.56	–
Total valid votes		29,880	99.76	
Total rejected ballots		72	0.24	–
Turnout		29,952	68.76	–
Eligible voters		43,563		
Progressive Conservative notional hold		Swing		–
This riding was created from Coast Chilcotin, Fraser Valley East, Kamloops—Cariboo and Skeena, which elected three Liberals and a Progressive Conservative (Fraser Valley East).
Source: Elections Canada

== See also ==
- List of Canadian electoral districts
- Historical federal electoral districts of Canada
