= Richmond-Steveston =

Provincial electoral district in British Columbia, Canada

British Columbia electoral district
- Interactive map of riding boundaries

Provincial electoral district
- Legislature: Legislative Assembly of British Columbia
MLA
Gordon Zhang
Conservative
- First contested: 1991
- Last contested: 2026

Demographics
- Population (2021): 56,775
- Area (km²): 31
- Pop. density (per km²): 1,831.5
- Census division: Metro Vancouver
- Census subdivision: Richmond (part)

Richmond-Steveston is a provincial electoral district in British Columbia that has been represented in the Legislative Assembly of British Columbia since 1991.

Established under the 1991 electoral redistribution, the district was first contested in the 1991 general election. It was created following the division of the previous two-member district of Richmond.

== Demographics ==
Population, 2021	56,775
Area (km^{2})	31
Pop. density (people per km^{2})	1,831
Source: BC Electoral Boundaries Commission

== Geography ==
The electoral district comprises the part of the city of Richmond (including Steveston) lying westerly and southerly of the following boundary: commencing at the intersection of the westerly limit of said city with the westerly production of Blundell Road, then east along said road to No. 3 Road, thence south along said road and its production to the southern limit of said city.

== Members of the Legislative Assembly ==
This riding has elected the following members of the Legislative Assembly:

Assembly	Years	Member	Party
Richmond-Steveston; Riding created from Richmond
35th	1991–1996	Allan Warnke	Liberal
36th	1996–2001	Geoff Plant	Liberal
37th	2001–2005	Geoff Plant	Liberal
38th	2005–2009	John Yap	Liberal
39th	2009–2013	John Yap	Liberal
40th	2013–2017	John Yap	Liberal
41st	2017–2020	John Yap	Liberal
42nd	2020–2024	Kelly Greene	New Democratic
43rd	2024–2026	Kelly Greene	New Democratic
44th	2026–present	Gordon Zhang	Conservative

== Election results ==
Graph of provincial election results in Richmond-Steveston (minor parties that never got 2% of the vote or didn't run consistently are omitted) View source data.

2026 British Columbia general election
Party	Candidate	Votes	%	±%	Expenditures
Conservative	Gordon Zhang	10,843	54.2	+12.0	
New Democratic	Bruce Kong	7,002	35.0	-9.3	
CentreBC	Barry Wosk	1,598	8.0	-	
Independent	Robert Evans	444	2.2	-	
CanWest	Keenan Yang	126	0.6	-	
Total valid votes/expenses limit			20,013		
Total rejected ballots			–		
Turnout			–		
Registered voters					
Conservative gain from New Democratic		Swing		+19.2	
Source: Elections BC

2024 British Columbia general election
Party	Candidate	Votes	%	±%	Expenditures
New Democratic	Kelly Greene	10,332	44.27	-7.2	$38,338.99
Conservative	Michelle Mollineaux	9,848	42.20	–	$18,513.57
Unaffiliated	Jackie Lee	2,354	10.09	–	$58,942.71
Green	Elodie Vaudandaine	803	3.44	–	$0.00
Total valid votes/expense limit		23,337	99.78	–	$71,700.08
Total rejected ballots		52	0.22	–	
Turnout		23,389	59.87	–	
Registered voters		39,067			
New Democratic notional hold		Swing		-24.7	
Source: Elections BC

2020 provincial election redistributed results
Party	%
New Democratic	51.5
Liberal	46.3
Others	2.2

2020 British Columbia general election
Party	Candidate	Votes	%	±%	Expenditures
New Democratic	Kelly Greene	10,733	52.07	+12.72	$35,020.17
Liberal	Matt Pitcairn	9,398	45.59	−2.01	$49,104.63
Independent	Vince Li	483	2.34	–	$0.00
Total valid votes		20,614	100.00	–	
Total rejected ballots		192	0.92	+0.04	
Turnout		20,806	56.09	−6.68	
Registered voters		37,092			
New Democratic gain from Liberal		Swing		+7.37	
Source: Elections BC

2018 British Columbia electoral reform referendum
Side	Votes	%
First Past the Post	11,034	71.26
Proportional Representation	4,450	28.74
Total valid votes	15,484	100.0
Total rejected ballots	82	0.53
Source: Elections BC

2017 British Columbia general election
Party	Candidate	Votes	%	±%	Expenditures
Liberal	John Yap	10,332	47.60	−4.07	$63,896
New Democratic	Kelly Greene	8,542	39.35	+11.28	$21,429
Green	Roy Sakata	2,833	13.05	+4.91	$2,449
Total valid votes		21,707	100.00	–	
Total rejected ballots		192	0.88	+0.22	
Turnout		21,899	62.77	+7.38	
Registered voters		34,889			
Liberal hold		Swing		−7.68	
Source: Elections BC

2013 British Columbia general election
Party	Candidate	Votes	%	±%	Expenditures
Liberal	John Yap	12063	51.67	-9.33	$154,933
New Democratic	Scott Stewart	6553	28.07	+1.07	$19,284
Conservative	Carol Day	2662	11.40	+6.4	$8,744
Green	Jerome James Dickey	1904	8.15	+1.15	$3,559
Unparty	Mike Donovan	166	0.71	–	$1,055
Total valid votes		23431	100.00		
Total rejected ballots		155	0.66		
Turnout		23586	55.39		
Source: Elections BC

2009 British Columbia general election
Party	Candidate	Votes	%	±%	Expenditures
Liberal	John Yap	13,168	61	+2	$109,468
New Democratic	Sue Wallis	5,925	27	−4	$17,718
Green	Jeff Hill	1,491	7	−1	$350
Conservative	Barry Chilton	1,082	5	–	$450
Total valid votes		21,666	100		
Total rejected ballots		167	0.76		
Turnout		21,833	52		

2009 British Columbia electoral reform referendum
Side	Votes	%
First Past the Post	13,701	65.2
BC-STV	7,312	34.8
Total valid votes	21,013	100.0
Total rejected ballots	819	3.75
Source: Elections BC

2005 British Columbia general election
Party	Candidate	Votes	%	Expenditures
Liberal	John Yap	13,859	59.20	$90,951
New Democratic	Kay Hale	7,334	31.33	$8,858
Green	Egidio Spinelli	1,934	8.27	$731
Democratic Reform	Daniel Stuart Ferguson	282	1.20	$247
Total valid votes		23,409	100	
Total rejected ballots		152	0.65	
Turnout		23,561	59.87	

2005 British Columbia electoral reform referendum
Side	Votes	%
Yes	12,401	54.63
No	10,301	45.37
Total valid votes	22,702	100.0
Total rejected ballots	651	2.79
Source: Elections BC

2001 British Columbia general election
Party	Candidate	Votes	%	Expenditures
Liberal	Geoff Plant	14,508	69.23	$56,820
New Democratic	Billie Mortimer	2,564	12.24	$2,734
Green	Kevan Hudson	2,257	10.77	$1,063
Marijuana	Gordon Mathias	561	2.68	$705
Unity	Vincent Paul	381	1.82	$610
Independent	Allan Warnke	358	1.71	$1,562
Conservative	Barry Edward Chilton	160	0.76	$240
Reform	Sue Wade	145	0.69	$610
People's Front	Edith Petersen	21	0.10	$100
Total valid votes		20,955	100.00	
Total rejected ballots		125	0.60	
Turnout		21,080	73.27	
Source: Elections BC

1996 British Columbia general election
Party	Candidate	Votes	%	Expenditures
Liberal	Geoff Plant	9,643	56.65	$39,769
New Democratic	Gail Paquette	5,041	29.61	$32,144
Progressive Democrat	Pat Young	919	5.40	$550
Reform	Shirley Abraham-Kirk	556	3.27	$2,765
Independent	Allan Warnke	450	2.64	$5,795
Green	Brian Gold	188	1.10	$100
Conservative	Gary L. Cross	99	0.58	$1,132
Social Credit	Gordon Neuls	88	0.52	$4,315
Natural Law	Nancy Stewart	38	0.23	$123
Total valid votes		17,022	100.00	
Total rejected ballots		85	0.50	
Turnout		17,107	74.36	
Source: Elections BC

1991 British Columbia general election
Party	Candidate	Votes	%	Expenditures
Liberal	Allan Warnke	6,664	38.32	$2,332
New Democratic	Harold Steves	6,054	34.81	$24,142
Social Credit	Nick Loenen	4,609	26.50	$44,277
Conservative	Gary L. Cross	65	3.19	$2,858
Total valid votes		17,392	100.00	
Total rejected ballots		321	1.81	
Turnout		17,713	77.67	

== Student vote results ==
Student Vote Canada is a non-partisan program in Canada that holds mock elections in elementary and high schools alongside general elections (with the same candidates and same electoral system).

2024 British Columbia general election
Party	Candidate	Votes	%	±%
Conservative	Michelle Mollineaux	913	34.85	–
New Democratic	Kelly Greene	903	34.47	–20.05
Green	Elodie Vaudandaine	403	15.38	–
Unaffiliated	Jackie Lee	401	15.31	–
Total valid votes		2,620	100.0	–
Source: Student Vote Canada

2020 British Columbia general election
Party	Candidate	Votes	%	±%
New Democratic	Kelly Greene	609	54.52	+15.63
Liberal	Matt Pitcairn	371	33.21	–2.41
Independent	Vince Li	137	12.26	–
Total valid votes		1,117	100.0	–
Source: Student Vote Canada

2017 British Columbia general election
Party	Candidate	Votes	%	±%
New Democratic	Kelly Greene	928	38.89	+6.29
Liberal	John Yap	850	35.62	+7.53
Green	Roy Sakata	608	25.48	+3.62
Total valid votes		2,386	100.0	–
Source: Student Vote Canada

2013 British Columbia general election
Party	Candidate	Votes	%	±%
New Democratic	Scott Stewart	607	32.6	+5.7
Liberal	John Yap	523	28.09	–16.6
Green	Jerome James Dickey	407	21.86	+3.75
Conservative	Carol Day	274	14.72	+4.42
Unparty	Mike Donovan	51	2.74	–
Total valid votes		1,862	100.0	–
Source: Student Vote Canada

2009 British Columbia general election
Party	Candidate	Votes	%
Liberal	John Yap	412	44.69
New Democratic	Sue Wallis	248	26.9
Green	Jeff Hill	167	18.11
Conservative	Barry Chilton	95	10.3
Total valid votes		922	100.0
Source: Student Vote Canada

2009 British Columbia electoral reform referendum
Side	Votes	%
First Past the Post	486	58.84
BC-STV	340	41.16
Total valid votes	826	100.0
Source: Student Vote Canada

== See also ==
- List of British Columbia provincial electoral districts
- Canadian provincial electoral districts
