= Ray Skelly =

Canadian politician (1941–2019)

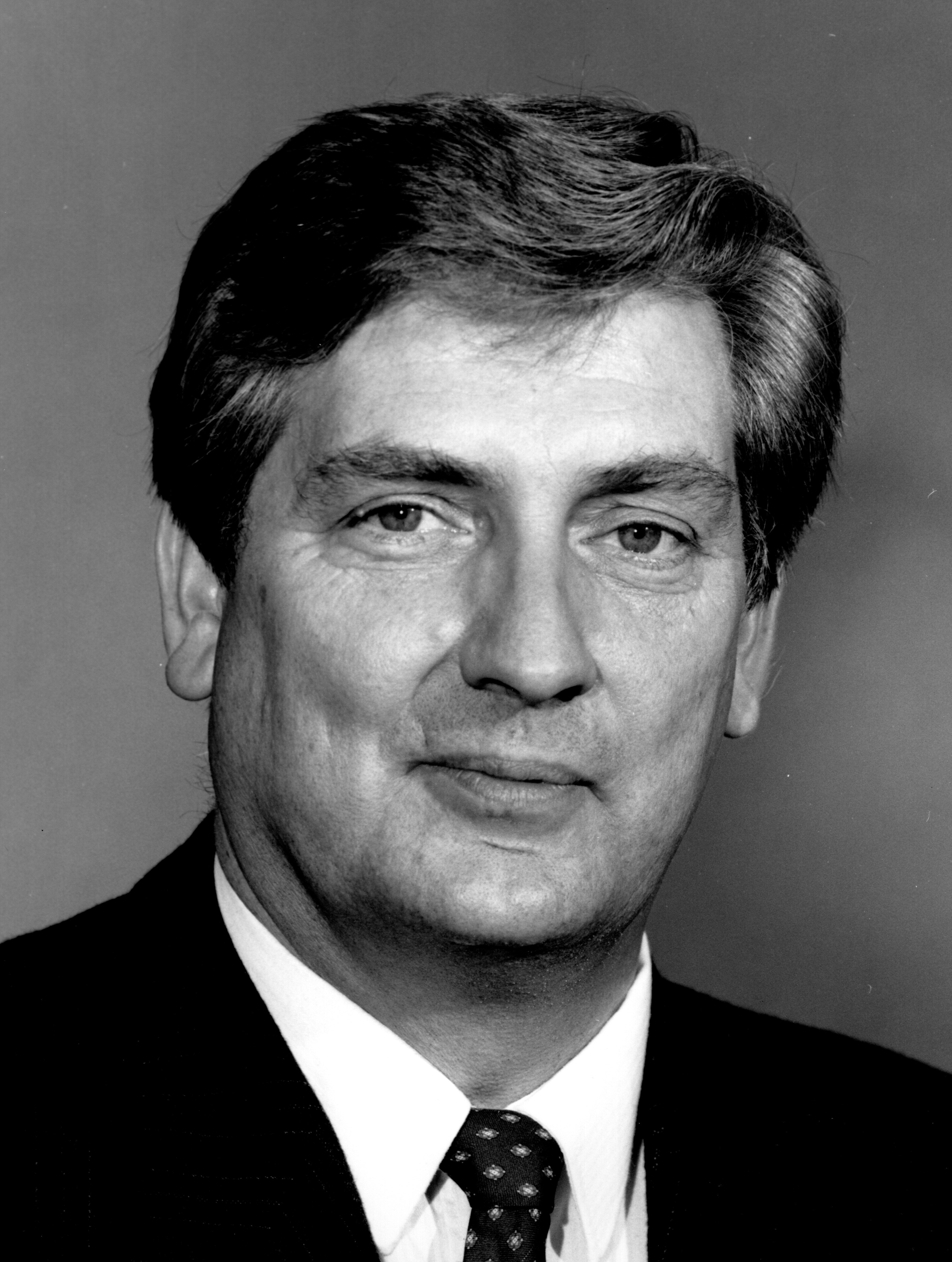

Member of Parliament
- In office 1979–1993
- Succeeded by: John Duncan
- Constituency: Comox—Powell River (1979–88); North Island—Powell River (1988–93)

Personal details
- Born: Raymond John Skelly; July 1, 1941 New Westminster, British Columbia, Canada
- Died: July 14, 2019 (aged 78) Comox, British Columbia
- Party: New Democratic Party
- Profession: Teacher

Raymond John Skelly (July 1, 1941 – July 14, 2019) was a Canadian politician.

A teacher by profession, Skelly was first elected as the New Democratic Party Member of Parliament for Comox—Powell River in the 1979 federal election. He served for fourteen years until being defeated in the 1993 federal election in the renamed riding of North Island—Powell River. This defeat was partly in response to the electorate's dissatisfaction with the provincial government led by New Democratic Party Premier Mike Harcourt. As a result, 15 of 17 incumbent New Democratic Party parliamentarians failed in their re-election bids in 1993.

During his time in Parliament, Skelly served as critic on several portfolios of particular concern to his constituents including economic development in Western Canada, fisheries, and mines & energy. He attempted a comeback in the 2000 federal election in Cariboo—Chilcotin but was defeated. He is the brother of fellow politician Bob Skelly, who served in the Legislative Assembly of British Columbia and led the British Columbia New Democratic Party. In the 1988 federal election, Ray and Bob pulled off a rare feat with both elected to the 34th Parliament and are the most recent siblings to have served in Parliament together.

== Sources ==
- Ray Skelly – Parliament of Canada biography
