= Canadian federal election results on Vancouver Island =

Seats obtained by party

Conservative
Liberal
New Democratic
Green
Alliance (defunct)
Reform (defunct)
Progressive Conservative (defunct)
CCF (defunct)
Independents

This page shows results of Canadian federal elections on Vancouver Island.

== Regional profile ==
Like most of British Columbia outside of Greater Vancouver, Vancouver Island tends to be a battleground between the Conservatives and the New Democratic Party (NDP). This is as true now, as has been in the past, except between 1988 and 2004. In 1988, the NDP swept the island in a wave of popular support that saw the party win the most seats in its history. This was wiped out in 1993 however, when many NDP voters switched to the Reform Party which won every seat except Victoria, which was picked up by the Liberals for the first time since 1968. This arrangement continued until the resurgence of the NDP in 2004, which led to it picking up Nanaimo—Cowichan, while the Liberals benefited by the seat switching of Keith Martin in Esquimalt—Juan de Fuca, whose personal popularity allowed him to be re-elected as a Liberal.

Since winning their first seat in the region in seventeen years in 2004, the NDP won two more seats here in 2006 picking up Victoria from the Liberals and Vancouver Island North from the Tories. The Tories won Vancouver Island North back in 2008. In 2011, the NDP picked up Esquimalt—Juan de Fuca from the Liberals while Green Party leader Elizabeth May defeated Tory cabinet member Gary Lunn in Saanich—Gulf Islands to win her party's first elected parliamentary seat in history. The Liberals failed to cross the 15 percent mark in any Vancouver Island-based riding. The island swung hard to the NDP in 2015; May was the only non-NDP MP elected here. In 2019, the Greens were able to pick up Nanaimo-Ladysmith, as well as win over 25% of the vote in Victoria and Esquimalt-Saanich Sooke. The Island is now a 3 way race between the NDP, the Conservatives, and the Greens.

2021 election results on Vancouver Island
Party	Votes		Seats
Party	Total	%	Seats
New Democratic	170,555	37.0	6
Green	66,819	14.6	1
Conservative	118,160	25.7	
Liberal	81,548	17.8	
People's	20,575	4.5	
Communist	681	0.15	
Maverick	310	0.07	
Animal Alliance	273	0.0	
Marxist–Leninist	201	0.0	
Total	459,122	100	7

=== Votes by party throughout time ===
Election	Liberal	Conservative	New Democratic	Green	PC	Reform / Alliance	Others
1979	43,290; 17.5%	—	92,056; 37.1%	—	110,908; 44.7%	—	1,647; 0.7%
1980	38,564; 15.3%	—	107,446; 42.8%	—	101,767; 40.5%	—	3,471; 1.4%
1984	33,829; 11.5%	—	121,076; 41.1%	2,543; 0.9%	133,294; 45.3%	—	3,613; 1.2%
1988	49,742; 15.7%	—	138,695; 43.9%	3,012; 1.0%	94,076; 29.8%	26,695; 8.4%	3,994; 1.3%
1993	85,732; 25.6%	—	64,369; 19.2%	3,401; 1.0%	32,638; 9.7%	124,229; 37.1%	24,526; 7.3%
1997	79,350; 26.1%	—	65,325; 21.5%	8,670; 2.9%	16,319; 5.4%	130,561; 42.9%	3,844; 1.3%
2000	88,094; 28.0%	—	40,367; 12.8%	12,291; 3.9%	25,512; 8.1%	140,877; 44.8%	7,486; 2.4%
2004	89,248; 25.7%	108,848; 31.4%	111,322; 32.1%	35,182; 10.1%	Merged into Conservative Party		2,241; 0.6%
2006	83,579; 22.7%	124,640; 33.9%	132,333; 36.0%	24,175; 6.6%	Merged into Conservative Party		3,112; 0.8%
2008	67,821; 18.7%	142,006; 39.3%	113,924; 31.5%	35,755; 9.9%	Merged into Conservative Party		2,251; 0.6%
2011	30,125; 7.9%	146,783; 38.4%	146,878; 38.5%	56,751; 14.9%	Merged into Conservative Party		1,395; 0.4%
2015	100,557; 21.3%	99,934; 21.2%	157,187; 33.3%	111,988; 23.8%	Merged into Conservative Party		1,854; 0.4%
2019	76,739; 15.9%	116,262; 24.1%	150,437; 31.2%	130,021; 27.0%	Merged into Conservative Party		8,652; 1.8%
2021	81,548; 17.8%	118,160; 25.7%	170,555; 37.0%	66,819; 14.6%	Merged into Conservative Party		22,040; 4.8%
2025	183,970; 34.1%	167,290; 31.0%	132,083; 24.5%	53,730; 10.0%	Merged into Conservative Party		2,479; 0.4%

Liberal Conservative New Democratic Green People's	Progressive Conservative (defunct) Alliance (defunct) Reform (defunct)

== 2021 ==
Parties	1st	2nd	3rd	4th	5th
New Democratic	6	0	0	1	0
Green	1	0	1	4	1
Conservative	0	5	2	0	0
Liberal	0	2	4	1	0
People's	0	0	0	1	6

Electoral district	Candidates						Incumbent
Electoral district	Liberal	Conservative	NDP	Green	PPC	Other	Incumbent
Courtenay—Alberni	Susan Farlinger; 9,276; 13.39%	Mary Lee; 22,181; 32.03%	Gord Johns; 30,612; 44.21%	Susanne Lawson; 3,590; 5.18%	Robert Eppich; 3,467; 5.01%	Barbara Biley (M-L); 124; 0.18%	Gord Johns
Cowichan—Malahat—Langford	Blair Herbert; 10,320; 16.37%	Alana DeLong; 17,870; 28.35%	Alistair MacGregor; 26,968; 42.78%	Lia Versaevel; 3,922; 6.22%	Mark Hecht; 3,952; 6.27%		Alistair MacGregor
Esquimalt—Saanich—Sooke	Doug Kobayashi; 14,466; 22.07%	Laura Anne Frost; 13,885; 21.18%	Randall Garrison; 28,056; 42.81%	Harley Gordon; 5,891; 8.99%	Rob Anderson; 2,995; 4.57%	Tyson Riel Strandlund (Comm.); 249; 0.38%	Randall Garrison
Nanaimo—Ladysmith	Michelle Corfield; 9,314; 13.54%	Tamara Kronis; 18,627; 27.09%	Lisa Marie Barron; 19,826; 28.83%	Paul Manly; 17,640; 25.65%	Stephen Welton; 3,358; 4.88%		Paul Manly
North Island—Powell River	Jennifer Grenz; 7,922; 13.15%	Shelley Downey; 21,670; 35.96%	Rachel Blaney; 23,833; 39.55%	Jessica Wegg; 3,656; 6.07%	Paul Macknight; 2,795; 4.64%	Stacey Gastis (Mav.); 310 0.51%	Rachel Blaney
North Island—Powell River	Jennifer Grenz; 7,922; 13.15%	Shelley Downey; 21,670; 35.96%	Rachel Blaney; 23,833; 39.55%	Jessica Wegg; 3,656; 6.07%	Paul Macknight; 2,795; 4.64%	Carla Neal (M-L); 77 0.13%	Rachel Blaney
Saanich—Gulf Islands	Sherri Moore-Arbour; 12,056; 18.40%	David Busch; 14,775; 22.55%	Sabina Singh; 11,959; 18.25%	Elizabeth May; 24,648; 37.62%	David Hilderman; 1,943; 2.97%	Dock Currie (Comm.); 141; 0.22%	Elizabeth May
Victoria	Nikki Macdonald; 18,194; 27.26%	Hannah Hodson; 9,152; 13.71%	Laurel Collins; 29,301; 43.90%	Nick Loughton; 7,472; 11.19%	John Randal Phipps; 2,065; 3.09%	Jordan Reichert (Animal); 273 0.41%	Laurel Collins
Victoria	Nikki Macdonald; 18,194; 27.26%	Hannah Hodson; 9,152; 13.71%	Laurel Collins; 29,301; 43.90%	Nick Loughton; 7,472; 11.19%	John Randal Phipps; 2,065; 3.09%	Janis Zroback (Comm.); 291 0.44%	Laurel Collins

== 2019 ==
Parties	1st	2nd	3rd	4th
New Democratic	5	0	1	1
Green	2	2	3	0
Conservative	0	5	1	1
Liberal	0	0	2	5

Electoral district	Candidates						Incumbent
Electoral district	Liberal	Conservative	NDP	Green	PPC	Other	Incumbent
Courtenay—Alberni	Jonah Baden Gowans; 8,620; 11.93%	Byron Horner; 23,936; 33.12%	Gord Johns; 29,790; 41.21%	Sean Wood; 9,762; 13.51%		Barbara Biley (M-L); 172; 0.24%	Gord Johns
Cowichan—Malahat—Langford	Blair Herbert; 10,301; 15.79%	Alana DeLong; 16,959; 26.00%	Alistair MacGregor; 23,519; 36.06%	Lydia Hwitsum; 13,181; 20.21%	Rhonda Chen; 1,066; 1.63%	Robin Morton Stanbridge (CHP); 202; 0.31%	Alistair MacGregor
Esquimalt—Saanich—Sooke	Jamie Hammond; 12,554; 17.90%	Randall Pewarchuk; 13,409; 19.12%	Randall Garrison; 23,887; 34.06%	David Merner; 18,506; 26.39%	Jeremy Gustafson; 1,089; 1.55%	Fidelia Godron (Ind.); 99; 0.14% Louis Lesosky (Ind.); 100; 0.14% Philip Ney (Ind.); 83; 0.12% Josh Steffler (Libert.); 287; 0.41% Tyson Strandlund (Comm.); 111; 0.16%	Randall Garrison
Nanaimo—Ladysmith	Michelle Corfield; 9,735; 13.55%	John Hirst; 18,634; 25.93%	Bob Chamberlin; 16,985; 23.63%	Paul Manly; 24,844; 34.57%	Jennifer Clarke; 1,049; 1.46%	James Chumsa (Comm.); 104; 0.14% Brian Marlatt (PC); 207; 0.29% Geoff Stoneman (Ind.); 235; 0.33% Echo White (Ind.); 71; 0.10%	Paul Manly
North Island—Powell River	Peter Schwarzhoff; 8,251; 13.11%	Shelley Downey; 20,502; 32.59%	Rachel Blaney; 23,834; 37.88%	Mark de Bruijn; 8,891; 14.13%	Brian Rundle; 1,102; 1.75%	Carla Neal (M-L); 48; 0.08% Glen Staples (Ind.); 287; 0.46%	Rachel Blaney
Saanich—Gulf Islands	Ryan Windsor; 11,326; 16.62%	David Busch; 13,784; 20.23%	Sabina Singh; 8,657; 12.70%	Elizabeth May; 33,454; 49.09%	Ron Broda; 929; 1.36%		Elizabeth May
Victoria	Nikki Macdonald; 15,952; 22.30%	Richard Caron; 9,038; 12.63%	Laurel Collins; 23,765; 33.21%	Racelle Kooy; 21,383; 29.89%	Alyson Culbert; 920; 1.29%	Robert Duncan (Comm.); 113; 0.16% Jordan Reichert (Animal); 221; 0.31% Keith Rosenberg (VCP); 46; 0.06% David Shebib (Ind.); 111; 0.16%	Murray Rankin†

== 2015 ==
Electoral district	Candidates					Incumbent
Electoral district	Conservative	NDP	Liberal	Green	Other	Incumbent
Courtenay—Alberni	John Duncan; 19,714; 28.22%	Gord Johns; 26,582; 38.06%	Carrie Powell-Davidson; 15,212; 21.78%	Glenn Sollitt; 8,201; 11.74%	Barbara Biley (M-L); 140; 0.20%	James Lunney†; Nanaimo—Alberni
Cowichan—Malahat—Langford	Martin Barker; 14,091; 22.81%	Alistair MacGregor; 22,200; 35.94%	Luke Krayenhoff; 14,685; 23.77%	Fran Hunt-Jinnouchi; 10,462; 16.93%	Alastair Haythornthwaite (M-L); 340; 0.55%	Jean Crowder†; Nanaimo—Cowichan
Esquimalt—Saanich—Sooke	Shari Lukens; 11,912; 17.50%	Randall Garrison; 23,836; 35.01%	David Merner; 18,622; 27.35%	Frances Litman; 13,575; 19.94%	Tyson Strandlund (Comm.); 136; 0.20%	Randall Garrison; Esquimalt—Juan de Fuca
Nanaimo—Ladysmith	Mark Allen MacDonald; 16,637; 23.35%	Sheila Malcolmson; 23,651; 33.20%	Tim Tessier; 16,753; 23.52%	Paul Manly; 14,074; 19.76%	Jack East (M-L); 126; 0.18%	New District
North Island—Powell River	Laura Smith; 15,840; 26.17%	Rachel Blaney; 24,340; 40.21%	Peter Schwarzhoff; 15,416; 25.47%	Brenda Sayers; 4,940; 8.16%		John Duncan‡ Vancouver Island North
Saanich—Gulf Islands	Robert Boyd; 13,260; 19.46%	Alicia Cormier; 6,181; 9.07%	Tim Kane; 11,380; 16.70%	Elizabeth May; 37,070; 54.40%	Meghan Jess Porter (Libert.); 249; 0.37%	Elizabeth May
Victoria	John Rizzuti; 8,480; 11.79%	Murray Rankin; 30,397; 42.28%	Cheryl Thomas; 8,489; 11.81% (Note: Cheryl Thomas publicly withdrew from the election 30 September; her name remained on the ballot as a Liberal candidate because no change could be made to the list of candidates after 28 September.)	Jo-Ann Roberts; 23,666; 32.92%	Saul Andersen (Ind.); 124 0.17%	Murray Rankin
Victoria	John Rizzuti; 8,480; 11.79%	Murray Rankin; 30,397; 42.28%	Cheryl Thomas; 8,489; 11.81%	Jo-Ann Roberts; 23,666; 32.92%	Art Lowe (Libert.); 539 0.75%	Murray Rankin
Victoria	John Rizzuti; 8,480; 11.79%	Murray Rankin; 30,397; 42.28%	Cheryl Thomas; 8,489; 11.81%	Jo-Ann Roberts; 23,666; 32.92%	Jordan Reichert (Animal All.); 200 0.28%	Murray Rankin

== 2011 ==
Electoral district	Candidates					Incumbent
Electoral district	Conservative	Liberal	NDP	Green	Other	Incumbent
Esquimalt—Juan de Fuca	Troy DeSouza; 25,792; 40.24%	Lillian Szpak; 6,439; 10.05%	Randall C. Garrison; 26,198; 40.87%	Shaunna Salsman; 5,341; 8.33%	Louis James Lesosky (Ind.); 181 0.28%	Keith Martin†
Esquimalt—Juan de Fuca	Troy DeSouza; 25,792; 40.24%	Lillian Szpak; 6,439; 10.05%	Randall C. Garrison; 26,198; 40.87%	Shaunna Salsman; 5,341; 8.33%	Christopher Robert Porter (CAP); 145 0.23%	Keith Martin†
Nanaimo—Alberni	James Lunney; 30,469; 46.42%	Renée Amber Miller; 4,984; 7.59%	Zenaida Maartman; 25,165; 38.34%	Myron Jespersen; 4,482; 6.83%	Barbara Biley (M-L); 81 0.12%	James Lunney
Nanaimo—Alberni	James Lunney; 30,469; 46.42%	Renée Amber Miller; 4,984; 7.59%	Zenaida Maartman; 25,165; 38.34%	Myron Jespersen; 4,482; 6.83%	Jesse Schroeder (Pirate); 363 0.55%	James Lunney
Nanaimo—Alberni	James Lunney; 30,469; 46.42%	Renée Amber Miller; 4,984; 7.59%	Zenaida Maartman; 25,165; 38.34%	Myron Jespersen; 4,482; 6.83%	Frank Wagner (CHP); 94 0.14%	James Lunney
Nanaimo—Cowichan	John Koury; 24,497; 38.31%	Brian Fillmore; 3,007; 4.70%	Jean Crowder; 31,272; 48.90%	Anne Marie Benoit; 5,005; 7.83%	Jack East (M-L); 170; 0.27%	Jean Crowder
Saanich—Gulf Islands	Gary Lunn; 24,544; 35.66%	Renée Hetherington; 4,208; 6.11%	Edith Loring-Kuhanga; 8,185; 11.89%	Elizabeth May; 31,890; 46.33%		Gary Lunn
Vancouver Island North	John Duncan; 27,206; 46.11%	Mike Holland; 3,039; 5.15%	Ronna-Rae Leonard; 25,379; 43.01%	Sue Moen; 3,018; 5.11%	Jason Draper (Ind.); 304 0.52%	John Duncan
Vancouver Island North	John Duncan; 27,206; 46.11%	Mike Holland; 3,039; 5.15%	Ronna-Rae Leonard; 25,379; 43.01%	Sue Moen; 3,018; 5.11%	Frank Martin (M-L); 57 0.10%	John Duncan
Victoria	Patrick Hunt; 14,275; 23.63%	Christopher Causton; 8,448; 13.98%	Denise Savoie; 30,679; 50.78%	Jared Giesbrecht; 7,015; 11.61%		Denise Savoie

== 2008 ==
Electoral district	Candidates					Incumbent
Electoral district	Conservative	Liberal	NDP	Green	Other	Incumbent
Esquimalt—Juan de Fuca	Troy DeSouza; 19,974; 34.07%	Keith Martin; 20,042; 34.18%	Jennifer Burgis; 13,322; 22.72%	Brian G. Gordon; 4,854; 8.28%	Philip G. Ney (Ind.); 309 0.53%	Keith Martin
Esquimalt—Juan de Fuca	Troy DeSouza; 19,974; 34.07%	Keith Martin; 20,042; 34.18%	Jennifer Burgis; 13,322; 22.72%	Brian G. Gordon; 4,854; 8.28%	Brad Rhodes (CAP); 130 0.22%	Keith Martin
Nanaimo—Alberni	James Lunney; 28,930; 46.68%	Richard Pesik; 5,578; 9.00%	Zeni Maartman; 19,680; 31.75%	John Fryer; 7,457; 12.03%	Barbara Biley (M-L); 155 0.25%	James Lunney
Nanaimo—Alberni	James Lunney; 28,930; 46.68%	Richard Pesik; 5,578; 9.00%	Zeni Maartman; 19,680; 31.75%	John Fryer; 7,457; 12.03%	Frank Wagner (CHP); 176 0.28%	James Lunney
Nanaimo—Cowichan	Reed Elley; 22,844; 37.59%	Brian Scott; 4,483; 7.38%	Jean Crowder; 27,454; 45.17%	Christina Knighton; 5,816; 9.57%	Jack East (M-L); 182; 0.30%	Jean Crowder
Saanich—Gulf Islands	Gary Lunn; 27,991; 43.42%	Briony Penn; 25,366; 39.35%	Julian West (Note: Julian West stepped down, however his name remained on the ballot.); 3,667; 5.69%	Andrew Lewis; 6,742; 10.46%	Jeremy Arney (CAP); 139 0.22%	Gary Lunn
Saanich—Gulf Islands	Gary Lunn; 27,991; 43.42%	Briony Penn; 25,366; 39.35%	Julian West; 3,667; 5.69%	Andrew Lewis; 6,742; 10.46%	Dale P. Leier (Libert.); 246 0.38%	Gary Lunn
Saanich—Gulf Islands	Gary Lunn; 27,991; 43.42%	Briony Penn; 25,366; 39.35%	Julian West; 3,667; 5.69%	Andrew Lewis; 6,742; 10.46%	Dan Moreau (CHP); 114 0.18%	Gary Lunn
Saanich—Gulf Islands	Gary Lunn; 27,991; 43.42%	Briony Penn; 25,366; 39.35%	Julian West; 3,667; 5.69%	Andrew Lewis; 6,742; 10.46%	Patricia O'Brien (WBP); 195 0.30%	Gary Lunn
Vancouver Island North	John Duncan; 25,963; 45.78%	Geoff Fleischer; 2,380; 4.20%	Catherine Bell; 23,466; 41.38%	Philip Stone; 4,544; 8.01%	Jason Draper (Ind.); 362; 0.64%	Catherine Bell
Victoria	Jack McClintock; 16,337; 27.56%	Anne Park Shannon; 10,006; 16.88%	Denise Savoie; 26,443; 44.61%	Adam Saab; 6,252; 10.55%	John Cooper (CHP); 237; 0.40%	Denise Savoie

== 2006 ==
Electoral district	Candidates						Incumbent
Electoral district	Liberal	Conservative	NDP	Green	Canadian Action	Other	Incumbent
Esquimalt—Juan de Fuca	Keith Martin; 20,761; 34.93%	Troy DeSouza; 16,327; 27.47%	Randall Garrison; 18,595; 31.29%	Mike Robinson; 3,385; 5.70%	David Piney; 89; 0.15%	Douglas Christie (WBP); 272; 0.46%	Keith Martin
Nanaimo—Alberni	Jim Stewart; 12,023; 19.05%	James Lunney; 26,102; 41.36%	Manjeet Uppal; 20,335; 32.23%	David Wright; 3,379; 5.35%	Jen Fisher-Bradley; 113; 0.18%	Barbara Biley (M-L); 94 0.15%	James Lunney
Nanaimo—Alberni	Jim Stewart; 12,023; 19.05%	James Lunney; 26,102; 41.36%	Manjeet Uppal; 20,335; 32.23%	David Wright; 3,379; 5.35%	Jen Fisher-Bradley; 113; 0.18%	R. L. Dusty Miller (Ind.); 920 1.46%	James Lunney
Nanaimo—Alberni	Jim Stewart; 12,023; 19.05%	James Lunney; 26,102; 41.36%	Manjeet Uppal; 20,335; 32.23%	David Wright; 3,379; 5.35%	Jen Fisher-Bradley; 113; 0.18%	Frank Wagner (CHP); 136 0.22%	James Lunney
Nanaimo—Cowichan	Brian Scott; 9,352; 15.32%	Norm Sowden; 19,615; 32.13%	Jean Crowder; 28,558; 46.77%	Harold Henn; 3,107; 5.09%	Jeff Warr; 277; 0.45%	Jack East (M-L); 148; 0.24%	Jean Crowder
Saanich—Gulf Islands	Sheila Orr; 17,144; 26.09%	Gary Vincent Lunn; 24,416; 37.15%	Jennifer Burgis; 17,445; 26.54%	Andrew Lewis; 6,533; 9.94%		Patricia O'Brien (WBP); 183; 0.28%	Gary Lunn
Vancouver Island North	Jim Mitchell; 7,239; 12.83%	John Duncan; 22,936; 40.64%	Catherine Bell; 23,552; 41.73%	Michael Mascall; 2,715; 4.81%			John Duncan
Victoria	David Mulroney; 17,056; 27.52%	Robin Baird; 15,249; 24.60%	Denise Savoie; 23,839; 38.46%	Ariel Lade; 5,036; 8.13%		Saul Andersen (Ind.); 282 0.45%	David Anderson†
Victoria	David Mulroney; 17,056; 27.52%	Robin Baird; 15,249; 24.60%	Denise Savoie; 23,839; 38.46%	Ariel Lade; 5,036; 8.13%		Bruce Burnett (WBP); 208 0.34%	David Anderson†
Victoria	David Mulroney; 17,056; 27.52%	Robin Baird; 15,249; 24.60%	Denise Savoie; 23,839; 38.46%	Ariel Lade; 5,036; 8.13%		Fred Mallach (Mar.); 311 0.50%	David Anderson†

== 2004 ==
Parties	1st	2nd	3rd	4th
Conservative	3	1	2	0
Liberal	2	1	3	0
New Democratic	1	4	1	0
Green	0	0	0	6

Electoral district	Candidates						Incumbent
Electoral district	Liberal	Conservative	NDP	Green	Canadian Action	Other	Incumbent
Esquimalt—Juan de Fuca	Keith Martin; 19,389; 35.30%	John Koury; 13,271; 24.16%	Randall Garrison; 16,821; 30.62%	Jane Sterk; 5,078; 9.24%	Shawn W. Giles; 141; 0.26%	Jen Fisher-Bradley (Ind.); 229; 0.42%	Keith Martin (Note: Elected as an Alliance MP in 2000, Keith Martin left the Alliance caucus in 2003, refusing to join the new Conservative Party and sat as an independent for the remainder of the 37th Parliament. He ran again successfully as a Liberal in 2004.)
Nanaimo—Alberni	Hira Chopra; 11,770; 19.86%	James D Lunney; 23,158; 39.07%	Scott Fraser; 19,152; 32.31%	David Wright; 4,357; 7.35%	Diana E. Lifton; 201; 0.34%	Barbara Biley (M-L); 80 0.13%	James Lunney
Nanaimo—Alberni	Hira Chopra; 11,770; 19.86%	James D Lunney; 23,158; 39.07%	Scott Fraser; 19,152; 32.31%	David Wright; 4,357; 7.35%	Diana E. Lifton; 201; 0.34%	Michael Mann (Mar.); 560 0.94%	James Lunney
Nanaimo—Cowichan	Lloyd Macilquham; 9,257; 16.03%	Dave Quist; 18,928; 32.78%	Jean Crowder; 25,243; 43.71%	Harold Henn; 3,822; 6.62%	Jeffrey Ian Warr; 270; 0.47%	Brunie Brunie (Ind.); 229; 0.40%	Reed Elley†
Saanich—Gulf Islands	David Mulroney; 17,082; 26.79%	Gary Lunn; 22,050; 34.58%	Jennifer Burgis; 13,763; 21.58%	Andrew Lewis; 10,662; 16.72%		Mary Moreau (Ind.); 214; 0.34%	Gary Lunn
Vancouver Island North	Noor Ahmed; 11,352; 21.46%	John Duncan; 18,733; 35.41%	Catherine Bell; 18,250; 34.50%	Pam Munroe; 4,456; 8.42%		Jack East (M-L); 111; 0.21%	John Duncan
Victoria	David Anderson; 20,398; 35.04%	Logan Wenham; 12,708; 21.83%	David Turner; 18,093; 31.08%	Ariel Lade; 6,807; 11.69%	Derek J. Skinner; 206; 0.35%		David Anderson

=== Maps ===
1. Esquimalt-Juan de Fuca
2. Nanaimo-Alberni
3. Nanaimo-Cowichan
4. Saanich-Gulf Islands
5. Vancouver Island North
6. Victoria
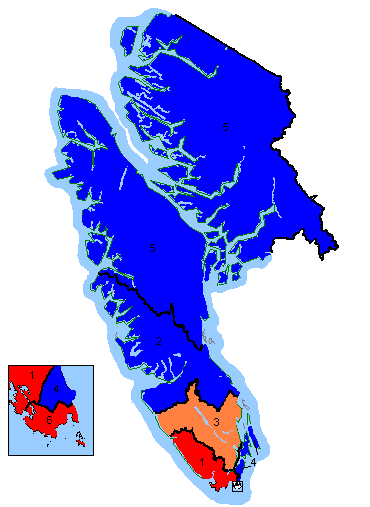
Key map

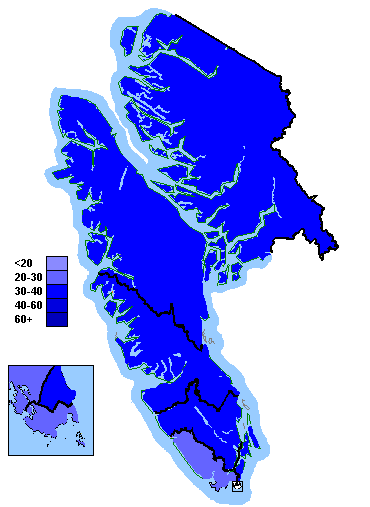
Conservative Party of Canada

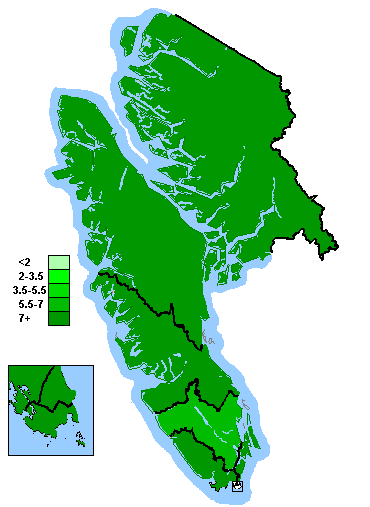
Green Party of Canada

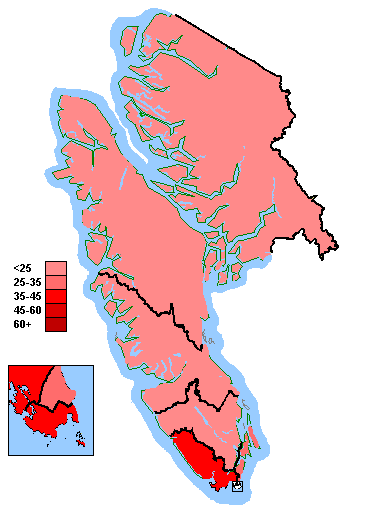
Liberal Party of Canada

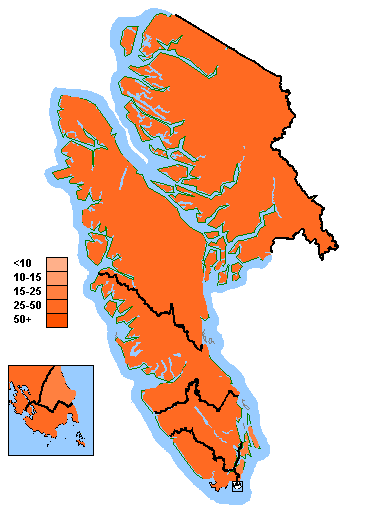
New Democratic Party

== 2000 ==
Parties	1st	2nd	3rd	4th
Alliance	5	1	0	0
Liberal	1	5	0	0
New Democratic	0	0	5	1
Progressive Conservative	0	0	1	5

Electoral district	Candidates						Incumbent
Electoral district	Liberal	Canadian Alliance	NDP	PC	Green	Other	Incumbent
Esquimalt—Juan de Fuca	Alan Thompson; 11,536	Keith Martin; 23,984	Carol E. Harris; 6,468	John Vukovic; 3,857	Casey Brennan; 2,056	Paul E. Tessier (NL); 324	Keith Martin
Nanaimo—Alberni	Hira Chopra; 10,877	James Lunney; 26,516	Bill Holdom; 7,635	Bill McCullough; 5,340		Donald Lavallee (Mar.); 1,125; Brunie Brunie (Ind); 830; Marty Howe (NL); 235	James Lunney
Nanaimo—Cowichan	Marshall Cooper; 10,857	Reed Elley; 23,641	Garth Mirau; 8,599	Cynthia-Mary Hemsworth; 3,640	Norm Abbey; 1,196	Doug Catley (CAP); 1,500; Meaghan Walker-Williams (Mar.); 1,262	Reed Elley
Saanich—Gulf Islands	Karen Knott; 19,002	Gary Lunn; 25,392	Pat O'Neill; 4,721	Don Page; 6,049	Wally Du Temple; 3,243	Kathleen Lapeyrouse (NL); 217; Dan Moreau (Ind); 123; Charley Stimac (Com.); 88	Gary Lunn
Vancouver Island North	Daniel P. Smith; 12,092	John Duncan; 24,844	Alex Turner; 5,701	David R. Tingley; 2,994	Pam Munroe; 2,532	John Krell (Ind); 216; Nancy More (NL); 205; Jack East (M-L); 92	John Duncan
Victoria	David Anderson; 23,730	Bruce Hallsor; 16,502	David Turner; 7,243	Brian Burchill; 3,629	Joan Russow; 3,264	Chuck Beyer (Mar); 863; Cal Danyluk (NL); 138; Lorenzo A. Bouchard (Ind); 101; Scott Rushton (Comm); 92; Mary Moreau (Ind); 75	David Anderson
