= Brennan Day =

Canadian politician

Member of the British Columbia Legislative Assembly for Courtenay-Comox
- In office October 19, 2024 – October 24, 2026
- Preceded by: Ronna-Rae Leonard
- Succeeded by: Will Cole-Hamilton

Personal details
- Party: BC Conservative (2024–2026, 2026–present)
- Other political affiliations: BC United (before 2024); Independent (2026)

Brennan Day is a Canadian politician who served as a member of the Legislative Assembly of British Columbia (MLA) representing the electoral district of Courtenay-Comox from 2024 to 2026. He is a member of the Conservative Party. In August 2026, Day briefly left the Conservative Party to sit as an independent, before returning in September 2026.

== Early life and career ==
Day is a longtime resident of the Comox Valley, and his professional background includes managing large-scale international projects and founding an industrial supply and training firm. Day was also the executive director of the Eureka Support Society, a mental health service provider in Courtenay, British Columbia when he was nominated. He holds a degrees in political science and international relations from Vancouver Island University.

== Political career ==
=== 2020 and 2024 elections ===
Day was the BC Liberal candidate for the Courtenay-Comox in the 2020 British Columbia general election, which he lost to NDP incumbent Ronna-Rae Leonard. In the 2024 provincial election, Day was announced as the Conservative Party of BC candidate for the Courtenay-Comox region, running again in the riding and winning by 92 votes, unseating Leonard.

=== Member of the Legislative Assembly ===
He served in the official opposition's shadow cabinet as the critic for Rural Health and Seniors' Health, and his policy priorities include addressing homelessness, substance abuse and mental health issues, and restoring stability and safety to his region.

He became viral in August 2025 for his strong negative response to a letter sent by American Republican state senator Joseph Martin from Maine to representatives of western Canadian provinces asking them to join the United States, calling it a "manifesto of arrogance" and "a perfect example of what many Canadians find so deeply troubling about the American worldview".

On August 26, Day announced he had resigned from the BC Conservative caucus in the Legislative Assembly, and that he would sit in the body as an independent conservative. He was the fifth BC Conservative MLA to defect in a two-week period. Day cited issues with leader Kerry-Lynne Findlay, saying he had lost faith "in the judgment, conduct, and ethical standards of her leadership" and of her advisers and allies. He returned to the party, in September following the resignation of Findlay.

In the 2026 British Columbia general election, Day was unseated by NDP candidate Will Cole-Hamilton, being the only Conservative candidate in the election to lose a seat to another party.

== Electoral history ==
2026 British Columbia general election: Courtenay-Comox
** Preliminary results — Not yet official **
Party	Candidate	Votes	%	±%
New Democratic	Will Cole-Hamilton	13,390	45.08	+6.51
Conservative	Brennan Day	12,694	42.73	+3.90
Green	Jay Van Oostdam	2,882	9.70	−11.04
CentreBC	Jason Cook	740	2.49	-
Total valid votes		29,706	99.95	
Total rejected ballots		16	0.05	−0.05
Turnout		29,722		
Registered voters				
New Democratic gain from Conservative		Swing		+1.31
Source: Elections BC

2024 British Columbia general election: Courtenay-Comox
Party	Candidate	Votes	%	±%	Expenditures
Conservative	Brennan Day	13,481	38.83	–	$54,803.68
New Democratic	Ronna-Rae Leonard	13,388	38.56	-12.00	$64,793.74
Green	Arzeena Hamir	7,202	20.74	+1.15	$54,310.40
Independent	John Hedican	504	1.45	–	$7,247.19
Independent	Devin Howell	143	0.41	–	$1,097.60
Total valid votes/expense limit		34,718	99.89	–	$71,700.08
Total rejected ballots		37	0.11	–	
Turnout		34,755	68.71	+7.25	
Registered voters		50,583			
Conservative notional gain from New Democratic		Swing		+25.42	
Source: Elections BC

2020 British Columbia general election: Courtenay-Comox
Party	Candidate	Votes	%	±%	Expenditures
New Democratic	Ronna-Rae Leonard	14,663	50.56	+13.20	$50,103.50
Liberal	Brennan Day	8,655	29.85	−6.87	$34,579.94
Green	Gillian Anderson	5,681	19.59	+1.22	$10,595.98
Total valid votes		28,999	100.00	–	
Total rejected ballots					
Turnout					
Registered voters					
Source: Elections BC
