= Gord Johns =

Canadian politician (born 1969)

Gord Johns MP
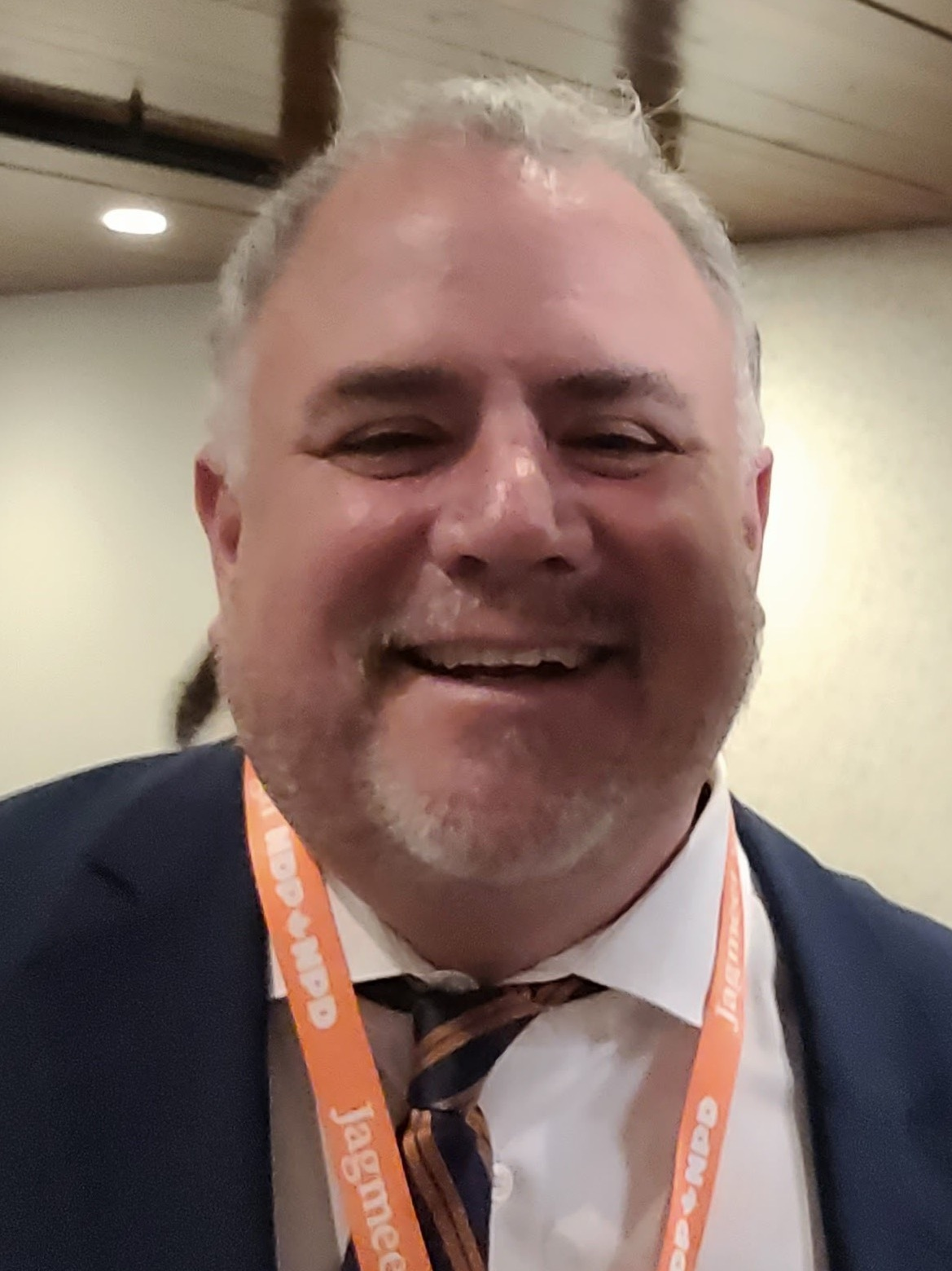

Member of Parliament for Courtenay—Alberni
- Incumbent
- Assumed office October 19, 2015
- Preceded by: Riding established

Tofino Town Councillor
- In office December 1, 2008 – December 5, 2011

Personal details
- Born: November 29, 1969 (age 56) Victoria, British Columbia
- Party: New Democratic

Gord Johns (born November 29, 1969) is a Canadian politician and businessman who serves the member of Parliament (MP) for Courtenay—Alberni. A member of the New Democratic Party (NDP), Johns has represented Courtenay—Alberni since the 2015 federal election. He previously served as a town councillor for Tofino, British Columbia and founded a small business.

== Early life and career ==
Johns was born and raised in Victoria, British Columbia. He graduated from Mount Douglas Secondary School, where he was valedictorian. He has three children.

For 13 years Johns operated a store specializing in sustainable products in Tofino. Over time he expanded the business with additional locations in Victoria and Whistler. However, the business ceased operations in 2010, due to the effects of the 2008-2009 recession. He also owned a small art gallery in Tofino for several years.

Johns served one term as a municipal councillor for the District of Tofino from 2008 to 2011. He did not seek re-election, and subsequently joined the Tofino-Long Beach Chamber of Commerce as the executive director. During this time, Johns also was the project manager of West Coast Multiplex Society, advocating for the construction of a multipurpose recreation facility.

== Political career ==
Johns won the NDP nomination for the newly-created Courtenay—Alberni in November 2014. In the 2015 federal election he faced Conservative Party candidate John Duncan, who had previously been MP of Vancouver Island North, out of which Courtenay—Alberni was created. Johns won the election, receiving 38.1% of the vote.

=== 42nd Parliament ===
Johns was appointed critic for small business and tourism by NDP leader Tom Mulcair. After Jagmeet Singh succeeded Mulcair, Singh retained Johns as critic for small business and tourism and added veterans affairs to his portfolio. As veteran affairs critic he introduced a motion to automatically carry forward all annual lapsed spending at the Department of Veterans Affairs to the next fiscal year, which was unanimously passed by the House of Commons.

During the 42nd Canadian Parliament Johns introduced a private member's bill the National Cycling Strategy Act (Bill C-312), which would have required the federal government to develop and implement a strategy to facilitate the development of cycling infrastructure, including a review of regulations and standards. However, the bill did not advance beyond first reading.

Johns served as the vice-chair of the Standing Committee on Veterans Affairs and the vice-chair on the Standing Committee on Fisheries and Oceans. In November 2017, Johns introduced M-151 requesting the federal government work with provinces, municipalities, and Indigenous communities to develop a national strategy to combat plastic pollution in aquatic environments. M-151 was voted on December 22, 2018, and unanimously passed. Subsequently, the federal government announced on June 10, 2019, that it planned to introduce a national ban on single-use plastics by 2021, including plastic bags, straws, cutlery, plates and stir sticks. The passing of the motion also caused municipalities and provinces to act by implementing various plastics bans. Prince Edward Island and Newfoundland and Labrador both became the first provinces to ban plastic bags. Two days before the federal announcement on banning single-use plastics, Tofino and Ucluelet officially became the first two municipalities in B.C. to implement bans on single-use plastic bags and plastic straws.

Johns presented two other motions in the House of Commons but neither came to a vote. A year after the sinking of the Leviathan II, Johns' motion M-46 requested the federal government allocate resources for training and equipment to volunteer first responders in remote coastal communities. Later, on June 12, 2019, Johns' motion M-245 requested the government to bring Canada's seafood labelling and traceability regulations in line with international standards.

=== 43rd Parliament ===
Johns was re-elected in the 2019 federal election, receiving 41.2% of the vote.

Following the election, Johns remained critic for small business, tourism and economic development and was appointed critic for fisheries and oceans as well deputy-critic for Indigenous-Crown relations and Indigenous services. Johns reintroduced his National Cycling Strategy Act as a private member's bill. While it was not brought to a vote, the government began work on a national active transportation strategy.

Johns also introduced private member's bill C-264 which sought to amend the Income Tax Act to increase both the volunteer firefighter tax credit and the search and rescue volunteer tax credit from $3,000 to $10,000, following up on his motion M-46 from the previous Parliament. In November 2020, he re-introduced private member bill C-257 to amend the Fisheries Act to require commercial finfish aquaculture only take place in closed containment facilities, which had previously been introduced in the previous three parliaments by fellow NDP member Fin Donnelly.

=== 44th Parliament ===
Johns was again re-elected in the 2021 federal election, receiving 44.2% of the vote.

Following the election, Johns was appointed the New Democratic Party critic for Mental Health and Harm Reduction, the critic for Procurement and the Public Service, and remained the deputy-critic for Fisheries and Oceans and the Canadian Coast Guard. Johns was a member of the multi-partisan Standing Committee on Government Operations and Estimates, and a member of the Canada-Japan Inter-Parliamentary Group, among others.

During the first session of the 44th Parliament, Johns introduced private member's bill (Bill C-216) to amend the Controlled Drugs and Substances Act. It consisted of three parts: the decriminalization of drug possession, expungement of criminal records for all Canadians with drug possession convictions, and the establishment of a National Strategy on Substance Use Act. The bill was defeated at the second reading.

Johns proposed five private member's motions in the 44th Parliament, none of which were debated.

=== 45th Parliament ===
Johns was re-elected in the 2025 federal election, receiving 39.6% of the vote, becoming the sole NDP MP elected on Vancouver Island as the party lost five previously held seats there. Johns serves as the NDP critic for Health (including Mental Health and Addictions), Rural, Small Business and Tourism, Fisheries and Oceans, Agriculture, Veteran Affairs, Heritage (Arts, Culture and Sport), and Emergency Preparedness.

Johns introduced the first private member's bill of the 45th Parliament. Bill C-201 would add mental health coverage to the Canada Health Act.

Johns was one of two NDP MPs, alongside Nunavut MP Lori Idlout, to abstain from voting on the 2025 Canadian federal budget. Johns stated that his decision to abstain on the budget came after consultation with constituents and elected leaders in his riding who did not want a fall election.

In 2026, Johns endorsed Heather McPherson in that year's federal NDP leadership race.

== Political positions ==
=== Toxic drug crisis ===
Johns supports a harm reduction approach to the opioid crisis in British Columbia, including the decriminalization of personal possession of opioids. In 2018, he called the opioid crisis the greatest emergency facing residents in the Alberni Valley, as opioid deaths in the region are 50% higher than the provincial average. In December 2018, Johns presented a petition with over 3,000 signatures to the House of Commons, calling on the government to address opioids as a National Public Health Emergency. In 2025, Johns criticized the federal government for allowing safer supply program funding to elapse without a renewal.

In the 44th Parliament, Johns called for an audit of the government's response to the toxic drug crisis after data revealed that 32,632 Canadians died due to drug poisoning between January 2016 and June 2022. Johns also introduced a private member's bill (Bill C-216) to amend the Controlled Drugs and Substances Act to decriminalize drug possession and implement a health-based approach to substance use.

In October 2025, Johns received the Allyship Award from the Canadian Association of People Who Use Drugs (CAPSA) for his advocacy on addictions care.

=== Mental health ===
During the COVID-19 pandemic, Johns called for greater mental health and addiction services, highlighting challenges faced by individuals in indigenous and remote communities. Johns also participated in a 2020 men's mental health awareness campaign.

In September 2022, Johns tabled private member's motion M-67 which recognized that Canada is experiencing a mental health and substance use crisis and called on the government to expand funding for mental health services and mental illness prevention. However, the motion never went beyond tabling. Johns tabled a similar motion in 2026 as Motion M-31 in the 45th Parliament, calling for a target of 12 per cent of overall health spending to be dedicated towards mental health.

Johns co-hosts an annual "Fathers' Day on the Hill" event, alongside Liberal MPs Matt Jeneroux and, during his tenure, former Liberal MP Majid Jowhari. The event seeks to raise awareness for men's mental health.

Johns has also advocated for improved mental health treatment for frontline service workers, Black public servants, and other vulnerable groups.

=== Health care & disability ===
In February 2021, Johns tabled a motion (M-73) urging the government to work with provinces and territories to establish a national strategy for the reintegration of workers who became mentally or physically impaired while employed and were at risk of losing their job.

In February 2022, Johns advocated for greater support for healthcare workers following the pandemic. In 2023, Johns tabled Bill C-213, which would have established a universal, single-payer, Pharmacare plan. Johns had previously presented a petition in 2020 calling for universal pharmacare. In 2024, the government implemented a pharmacare plan covering birth control and insulin, as per the provisions of the Liberal-NDP confidence and supply agreement. In 2026, Johns and NDP leader Avi Lewis criticized the government for what Johns calls a "patchwork" approach to implementation.

On June 10, 2025, Johns introduced Bill C-206, a private member's bill which would establish a national strategy on brain injuries, to improve prevention and treatment.

=== Climate change and conservation ===
Johns has advocated for addressing climate change and advancing wildlife conservation. As a municipal councillor in Tofino, Johns supported increased protections against logging in Clayoquot Sound.

As the executive director of the Tofino-Long Beach Chamber of Commerce Johns directed the chamber's opposition to the B.C. Chamber of Commerce's support of the Trans Mountain pipeline expansion. He continued his opposition as an MP, criticizing the Liberal government's approval of the expansion, labelling it a "betrayal" to B.C. residents.

Johns has called for greater support for workers transitioning out of carbon intensive industries, federal support for companies developing green technologies, and supports for local green entrepreneurs. He has also called for increased government efforts to meet its climate targets, and has advocated for the government to follow through on its promise to end subsidies for oil and gas companies.

Johns has also been involved in coordinating the Canadian Biosphere Day on the Hill, which recognized the significance of Canada's biospheres in conservation, sustainable development, and reconciliation.

Johns opposes the pipeline to the B.C. coast proposed by Alberta Premier Danielle Smith, citing environmental concerns, a lack of support from coastal First Nations, and potential carve-outs to the Oil Tanker Moratorium Act.

In early 2023, Johns petitioned the Federal government for legislation requiring every MP to consult with their riding's environmental youth leadership prior to bringing any greenhouse gas emissions bills forward to a second reading. The goal of this proposal was to ensure that Canadian youth, who lack direct representation in Parliament but will be significantly affected by the climate crisis, have a voice in the legislative process.

Johns is an advocate for improving firefighting capacity. In the lead-up to the 2025 budget, Johns advocated for the federal government to introduce a national aerial firefighting fleet. The federal budget included roughly $250 million over four years to lease water bombers. Johns also pushed for an increase to the volunteer firefighter tax credit from $3,000 to $10,000. In 2024, the federal government increased the credit to $6,000. Johns has called for changes to Canada's National Occupation Classification to expand its definition of "firefighter" to include wildland and forest firefighters.

=== Indigenous reconciliation ===
As an MP, Johns has supported a group of five Nuu-chah-nulth nations within his riding in their years-long legal dispute with the Government of Canada over the right to catch and sell fish in their territory. Johns lamented the expenditure of millions of dollars in legal fees despite repeated rulings by the courts affirming their Indigenous rights. He has also criticized the federal government for pursuing litigation in the Huu-ay-aht First Nation's challenge on logging rights.

Johns has also advocated for Indigenous-led businesses. During the COVID-19 pandemic Johns called for funding support for the Indigenous tourism sector numerous times, and successfully assisted the Huu-ay-aht First Nation secure federal funding after they had originally been denied the Canadian Emergency Wage Subsidy.

Following the sinking on the Leviathan II, Johns called for increased investment in the Canadian Coast Guard to better serve remote Indigenous communities in emergency situations. Johns has also advocated for reforms to address police brutality following the death of Chantal Moore, a Nuu-chah-nulth woman, killed during a wellness check in New Brunswick. Johns echoed the calls of Indigenous leaders to invite the United Nations Special Rapporteur on the Rights of Indigenous Peoples, to study systemic racism in Canada. In October 2020, Johns wrote to the Speaker of the House of Commons, calling for an emergency debate after escalating violence against Mi'kmaq fishers in Nova Scotia.

Johns called for a formal apology from the Catholic Church and greater action from the federal government to address the legacy of the Canadian Indian residential school system. In collaboration with Amnesty International, he presented a petition to the House of Commons requesting a formal apology from the government for the Sixties Scoop.

The Council of Ha'wiih, the Nuu-chah-nulth hereditary chiefs, gave Johns the name, "ciqh=sii", which means speaker of the Ha'wiih (hereditary Chiefs) and received their endorsement in the 2015 and 2019 general elections.

Johns supported the request of the Tseshaht First Nation for a healing center upon the grounds on the Alberni Indian Residential School, where 17 suspected unmarked graves have been identified and at least 67 students who died while at the school.

=== Veterans ===
As the NDP Critic for Veterans Affairs, Johns served as a vice-chair for the House of Commons Standing Committee on Veterans Affairs. Johns seconded two privates member's bills which sought to help end discrimination against veterans and their families.

Johns has hosted public discussions in his riding to listen to veterans' concerns, particularly related to difficulties in accessing services. He was acknowledged by Pacific Coast University for Workplace Health Sciences for his assistance securing funding for a program to help train disabled veterans. Johns was also critical of the government's approach to funding veterans pensions, arguing that the approach would lead to a discriminatory three-tiered system for veterans benefits. Johns was supportive of additional funding provided to local Royal Canadian Legion branches in his riding during the COVID-19 pandemic.

Johns was recognized by his constituent, a veteran, for helping him and his son attend the 75th anniversary of the Juno Beach landing alongside World War II survivors and Prime Minister Justin Trudeau.

On November 7, 2025, Johns introduced a private member's bill to remove the "gold digger clause" from the Canadian Forces Superannuation Act, which disallows spouses who marry a veteran over the age of 60 from receiving survivor benefits.

=== Housing and local infrastructure ===
Johns has called for increased investment in affordable housing in Courtenay—Alberni, highlighting the lack of affordable housing in the region and its harm on the local economy, pushing for collaborative efforts between governments.

Johns has supported local infrastructure projects, such as the Port Alberni Transhipment Hub (Path), Somass habitat restoration project, and helped break ground on a new water treatment plant. He advocated for investment from the federal government for the Alberni Valley Regional Airport.

During the COVID pandemic he called on individuals who could help to support local food banks. He has also pushed for the federal government to help provinces develop Farmers' Market Nutrition Coupon Programs to support farmers' markets and strengthen food security through his motion M-78 in 2021.

In June 2026, Johns tabled Motion M-37, which would call for a new non-market housing fund financed by the GST on new home sales.

=== Fisheries and oceans ===
During the 2015 election, Johns advocated for the restoration of Coast Guard stations on Vancouver Island, which had been closed under the Conservative government of Stephen Harper. Following the election, Johns alongside fellow New Democratic Party MP Rachel Blaney advocated for the Liberal government to halt the closure of the Comox Coast Guard station, and consider reopening the Ucluelet station. Although the station was not reopened, Johns helped push for the transfer of the building to the Government of British Columbia and Ucluelet.

Johns called for large changes to wild Pacific Salmon protections, including investments in the restoration, enhancement and protection of salmon habitat and increasing community input into the government's quota policies. He has called on the federal government to work with the Province of British Columbia and local First Nations to transition from open net operations to land-based facilities. Johns has warned of a complete a complete collapse of wild salmon populations without adequate action. Johns has also pushed for a moratorium on the roe herring fishery in the Salish Sea. Johns has advocated for the renewal of salmon restoration and enhancement programs, such as the BC Salmon Restoration and Innovation Fund and the Pacific Salmon Strategy Initiative.

As a member of the parliamentary Committee on Fisheries and Oceans studies (FOPO), Johns helped to successfully facilitate the passage of S-203, which banned the captivity of Cetaceans. For his work helping pass this bill, Johns was among the recipients of the 2020 Humane Canada Animal Welfare Leadership and Innovation Award.

During the COVID-19 pandemic, Johns called on the government to help prawn fishers better access the Canadian market by allowing the sale of "frozen-at-sea" prawns.

Johns has advocated for a coordinated effort from all levels of government to address abandoned vessels in coastal waters, particularly in Deep Bay.

In September 2022, Johns tabled two motions advocating for ocean protection. M-68 sought to promote the dismantling end-of-life marine vessels, including creating environmental and social standards as well as monetary assistance. M-69 sought to commit the government to a moratorium on deep seabed mining in the international seabed.

Johns is an advocate for coordinated federal efforts to prevent and clean up ocean pollution. Johns supports reviving the federal ghost gear fund to facilitate cleanup of lost fishing gear. In June 2025, he tabled Bill C-218, which would establish a national strategy respecting pollution caused by shipping container spills.

Johns has advocated for the development of a ship recycling facility in Port Alberni, convening a leadership group of experts, environmental groups, industry, First Nations, and local officials, alongside Mid Island-Pacific Rim MLA Josie Osborne.

=== Child care ===
In 2020, Johns called for the government to increase investment by build a universal child care and early learning system. He has called for more federal support for childcare following the COVID-19 pandemic.

=== Cycling ===
Johns has proposed the National Cycling Strategy Act, a Private member's bill in both the 42nd and 43rd Parliament. In 2017, to bring awareness to his efforts he cycled a 13-day tour of his riding, which included the first visit by an MP to Hesquiaht, a First Nations community located on Vancouver Island. Johns' advocacy led to the development of the Canadian government's Active Transportation Strategy, with Parliamentary Secretary to the Minister of Infrastructure and Communities Andy Fillmore stating that Johns "is getting what he wants, as are cycling advocates across the country."

Johns has been a long-time member of the All-Party Cycling Caucus, a group of Canadian parliamentarians who promote cycling infrastructure and work with cycling organizations and programs. In recognition of his advocacy, Johns has won the National Cycling Advocate Award from Vélo Canada Bikes.

=== Small businesses ===
As critic for small business and tourism, Johns called for the Liberal government to enact a campaign promise to cut the small business tax rate. In 2017, after the Liberal government proposed tax reforms impacting small businesses, Johns proposed that the allocated consultation time with small businesses be increased and extended beyond the summer to allow for more engagement. He also called for the reforms to include larger corporations.

During the COVID-19 pandemic, Johns advocated for emergency benefits for small businesses. He also called for BC Ferries to be included in the emergency wage subsidy program, highlighting their role connecting Vancouver Island and the Lower Mainland. Johns also advocated for an expansion of wage subsidy to more entities, while maintaining accountability. He also called on the government to work with Canada's banks to lower interest rates for small businesses, to limit their ability to profit from the administration of loan programs on behalf of the government. Johns also advocated in Parliament to waive the sales tax on gift cards sold prior to the 2020 holiday season, as a means of helping struggling small businesses during the holiday season.

At the beginning of the 42nd parliament Johns assisted in the reconstitution of the Entrepreneur Caucus.

=== Plastics ===
Johns introduced motion (M-151), calling for the government to work collaboratively with provinces, municipalities and Indigenous communities to develop a national strategy to combat plastic pollution in and around aquatic environments, after 35 shipping containers broke apart and washed ashore on Vancouver Island. The motion was passed unanimously.

Johns has supported single-use plastic bans in local communities including Qualicum Beach and Cumberland. He has also helped organize local beach cleanup efforts.

Johns pushed for the Canadian government to include plastic waste as a toxic substance under the Basel Convention, after a conflict with the Philippines after a Canadian shipment of waste was left in Manila.

=== Forestry ===
Johns is an advocate for sustainable forestry and supports for forestry workers. He advocated for the federal government to earmark more forestry industry supports for workers. Johns successfully advocated for a Biomass Investment Tax Credit to be included in the 2025 federal budget, aiming to protect forestry jobs.

In September 2022, Johns received the Jim Carr Forest Community Champions Award from the Forest Products Association of Canada, for his support for the biomass tax credit and for the paper mill in Port Alberni.

In February 2026, Public and Private Workers of Canada President Geoff Dawe praised Johns for supporting workers affected by the closure of the Crofton paper mill.

=== Rural issues ===
Johns opposes the Canadian Food Inspection Agency's proposed changes to the Plant Breeders' Regulations, that would disallow farmers from retaining and reusing seeds from specific crops.

In 2025, Johns tabled Motion M-3, which would call on the federal government to support the development of coupon programs that allow lower-income and marginalized people access food at local farmers' markets.

Johns supports Canada's supply management system for milk, eggs and poultry.

Johns is an advocate for improved broadband infrastructure and connectivity in rural areas.

=== Ferries ===
Johns supports efforts to increase federal spending on ferry services, particularly through increased transfers to BC Ferries. Johns leads a campaign, including an electronic petition targeted towards Vancouver Island and Sunshine Coast residents, to rectify what he has described as "significantly lower" funding received by BC Ferries compared to Atlantic Canadian ferry services.

== Electoral record ==
2025 Canadian federal election: Courtenay—Alberni
Party	Candidate	Votes	%	±%	Expenditures
New Democratic	Gord Johns	31,617	39.64	–3.24	$107,752.57
Conservative	Kris McNichol	28,028	35.14	+3.84	$98,868.84
Liberal	Brian Cameron	18,078	22.66	+9.05	$48,661.26
Green	Chris Markevich	1,352	1.70	–5.36	
People's	Thomas Gamble	427	0.54	–4.47	$3,486.49
Animal Protection	Teresa Knight	195	0.24	–	$3,570.37
Christian Heritage	Jesse Musial	69	0.09	–	$306.25
Total valid votes/expense limit		79,766	99.54	–	$152,320.49
Total rejected ballots		367	0.46	+0.15	
Turnout		80,133	73.85	+8.49	
Eligible voters		108,515			
New Democratic notional hold		Swing		–3.54	
Source: Elections Canada

2021 Canadian federal election: Courtenay—Alberni
Party	Candidate	Votes	%	±%	Expenditures
New Democratic	Gord Johns	30,612	44.21	+2.99	$102,309.88
Conservative	Mary Lee	22,181	32.03	–1.09	$99,155.22
Liberal	Susan Farlinger	9,276	13.40	+1.47	$37,061.04
Green	Susanne Lawson	3,590	5.18	–8.32	$9,378.63
People's	Robert Eppich	3,467	5.01	–	$6,474.87
Marxist–Leninist	Barbara Biley	124	0.18	–0.06	none listed
Total valid votes/expense limit		69,250	99.69	–	$131,260.27
Total rejected ballots		215	0.31	–0.18	
Turnout		69,465	65.35	–6.05	
Eligible voters		106,293			
New Democratic hold		Swing		+2.04	
Source: Elections Canada

2019 Canadian federal election: Courtenay—Alberni
Party	Candidate	Votes	%	±%	Expenditures
New Democratic	Gord Johns	29,790	41.22	+3.16	$126,481.09
Conservative	Byron Horner	23,936	33.12	+4.89	$95,576.91
Green	Sean Wood	9,762	13.51	+1.76	$14,805.72
Liberal	Jonah Baden Gowans	8,620	11.93	–9.85	$11,728.11
Marxist–Leninist	Barbara Biley	172	0.24	+0.04	none listed
Total valid votes/expense limit		72,280	99.51	–	$123,697.56
Total rejected ballots		359	0.49	+0.23	
Turnout		72,639	71.40	–4.50	
Eligible voters		101,731			
New Democratic hold		Swing		–0.87	
Source: Elections Canada

2015 Canadian federal election: Courtenay—Alberni
Party	Candidate	Votes	%	±%	Expenditures
New Democratic	Gord Johns	26,582	38.06	–2.66	$124,072.44
Conservative	John Duncan	19,714	28.22	–16.66	$92,251.34
Liberal	Carrie Powell-Davidson	15,212	21.78	+15.06	$32,002.88
Green	Glenn Sollitt	8,201	11.74	+4.89	$124,891.17
Marxist–Leninist	Barbara Biley	140	0.20	–	none listed
Total valid votes/expense limit		69,849	99.74		$231,958.67
Total rejected ballots		185	0.26	–	
Turnout		70,034	75.90	–	
Eligible voters		92,266			
New Democratic notional gain from Conservative		Swing		–7.00	
This riding was created from Nanaimo—Alberni and Vancouver Island North, both of which elected a Conservative candidate in the last election. John Duncan was the incumbent from Vancouver Island North.
Source: Elections Canada
