= Courtenay-Comox =

Provincial electoral district in British Columbia, Canada

British Columbia electoral district

Provincial electoral district
- Legislature: Legislative Assembly of British Columbia
MLA
Will Cole-Hamilton
New Democratic
- District created: 2015
- First contested: 2017
- Last contested: 2026

Demographics
- Population (2021): 60,354
- Area (km²): 1,587
- Pop. density (per km²): 38
- Census division: Comox Valley Regional District
- Census subdivision(s): Courtenay, Comox

Courtenay-Comox is a provincial electoral district in British Columbia that has been represented in the Legislative Assembly of British Columbia since 2017.

Created under the 2015 British Columbia electoral redistribution, the riding was first contested in the 2017 general election. It was created from parts of Comox Valley.

== Demographics ==
Population, 2021	60,354
Area (km^{2})	1,587
Pop. Density (people per km^{2})	38
Source: BC Electoral Boundaries Commission

== Geography ==
Located in the Comox Valley Regional District, the district comprises the communities of Courtenay, Comox, Little River, Merville and Black Creek. Its southern boundary follows the northern municipal boundary of Cumberland.

== History ==
It was contested for the first time in the 2017 election. On election night, the seat was declared as won by Ronna-Rae Leonard of the British Columbia New Democratic Party, by a margin of just nine votes over Jim Benninger of the British Columbia Liberal Party. A recount, as well as the counting of absentee ballots, pushed Leonard's lead to 189 votes over Benninger when final results were announced fifteen days after the election on May 24, 2017.

== Members of the Legislative Assembly ==
This riding has elected the following members of the Legislative Assembly:

Assembly	Years	Member	Party
Courtenay-Comox; Riding created from Comox Valley
41st	2017–2020	Ronna-Rae Leonard	New Democratic
42nd	2020–2024	Ronna-Rae Leonard	New Democratic
43rd	2024–2026	Brennan Day	Conservative
43rd	2026–2026 (Note: Rejoined the Conservatives after dissolution.)	Brennan Day	Independent
44th	2026–present	Will Cole-Hamilton	New Democratic

== Election results ==
2026 British Columbia general election
** Preliminary results — Not yet official **
Party	Candidate	Votes	%	±%
New Democratic	Will Cole-Hamilton	13,390	45.08	+6.51
Conservative	Brennan Day	12,694	42.73	+3.90
Green	Jay Van Oostdam	2,882	9.70	-11.04
CentreBC	Jason Cook	740	2.49	-
Total valid votes		29,706	99.95	
Total rejected ballots		16	0.05	-0.05
Turnout		29,722		
Registered voters				
New Democratic gain from Conservative		Swing		+1.31
Source: Elections BC

2024 British Columbia general election
Party	Candidate	Votes	%	±%	Expenditures
Conservative	Brennan Day	13,481	38.83	–	$54,803.68
New Democratic	Ronna-Rae Leonard	13,388	38.56	-12.00	$64,793.74
Green	Arzeena Hamir	7,202	20.74	+1.15	$54,310.40
Independent	John Hedican	504	1.45	–	$7,247.19
Independent	Devin Howell	143	0.41	–	$1,097.60
Total valid votes/expense limit		34,718	99.89	–	$71,700.08
Total rejected ballots		37	0.11	–	
Turnout		34,755	68.71	+7.25	
Registered voters		50,583			
Conservative notional gain from New Democratic		Swing		+25.42	
Source: Elections BC

2020 British Columbia general election
Party	Candidate	Votes	%	±%	Expenditures
New Democratic	Ronna-Rae Leonard	14,663	50.56	+13.20	$50,103.50
Liberal	Brennan Day	8,655	29.85	−6.87	$34,579.94
Green	Gillian Anderson	5,681	19.59	+1.22	$10,595.98
Total valid votes		28,999	100.00	–	
Total rejected ballots					
Turnout					
Registered voters					
Source: Elections BC

2017 British Columbia general election
Party	Candidate	Votes	%	Expenditures
New Democratic	Ronna-Rae Leonard	10,886	37.36	$55,597
Liberal	Jim Benninger	10,697	36.72	$43,935
Green	Ernie Sellentin	5,351	18.37	$8,612
Conservative	Leah Catherine McCulloch	2,201	7.55	$14,981
Total valid votes		29,135	100.00	
Total rejected ballots		77	0.26	
Turnout		29,212	66.89	
Registered voters		43,671		
Source: Elections BC

== See also ==
- List of British Columbia provincial electoral districts
- Canadian provincial electoral districts
