= Will Cole-Hamilton =

Canadian politician

Will Cole-Hamilton MLA
- Cole-Hamilton in 2026

Member of the British Columbia Legislative Assembly for Courtenay-Comox
- Incumbent
- Assumed office October 24, 2026
- Preceded by: Brennan Day

Personal details
- Party: New Democratic

Will Cole-Hamilton MLA is a Canadian politician who has served as a member of the Legislative Assembly of British Columbia (MLA) representing the electoral district of Courtenay-Comox since 2026. He is a member of the New Democratic Party.

== Political career ==
=== Municipal ===
Cole-Hamilton was a Courtenay City Councilor for two terms. Also in that role he served on the Comox Valley Regional District, eventually serving as its chair. During his tenure, he assisted in the creation of the Comox Valley Housing Authority.

Cole-Hamilton also held several leadership positions in other Local Government related organizations. He served on the boards of the Union of British Columbia Municipalities (UBCM), the Association of Vancouver Island and Coastal Communities (AVICC) and the Federation of Canadian Municipalities (FCM). Other roles included chairing the BC Chapter of the Climate Caucus amongst others.

=== Provincial ===
During the 2026 general election, Cole-Hamilton was nominated as the New Democratic candidate to run in the electoral district of Courtenay-Comox. He went on to defeat incumbent Conservative MLA Brennan Day, being the only NDP candidate in the election to gain a seat from another party.

== Electoral history ==
2026 British Columbia general election: Courtenay-Comox
** Preliminary results — Not yet official **
Party	Candidate	Votes	%	±%
New Democratic	Will Cole-Hamilton	14,532	45.29	
Conservative	Brennan Day	13,602	42.39	
Green	Jay Van Oostdam	3,134	9.77	
CentreBC	Jason Cook	792	2.47	-
Total valid votes		32,060	99.93	
Total rejected ballots		24	0.07	
Turnout		32,084		
Registered voters				
New Democratic gain from Conservative		Swing		+1.31
Source: Elections BC
