= Ronna-Rae Leonard =

Canadian politician

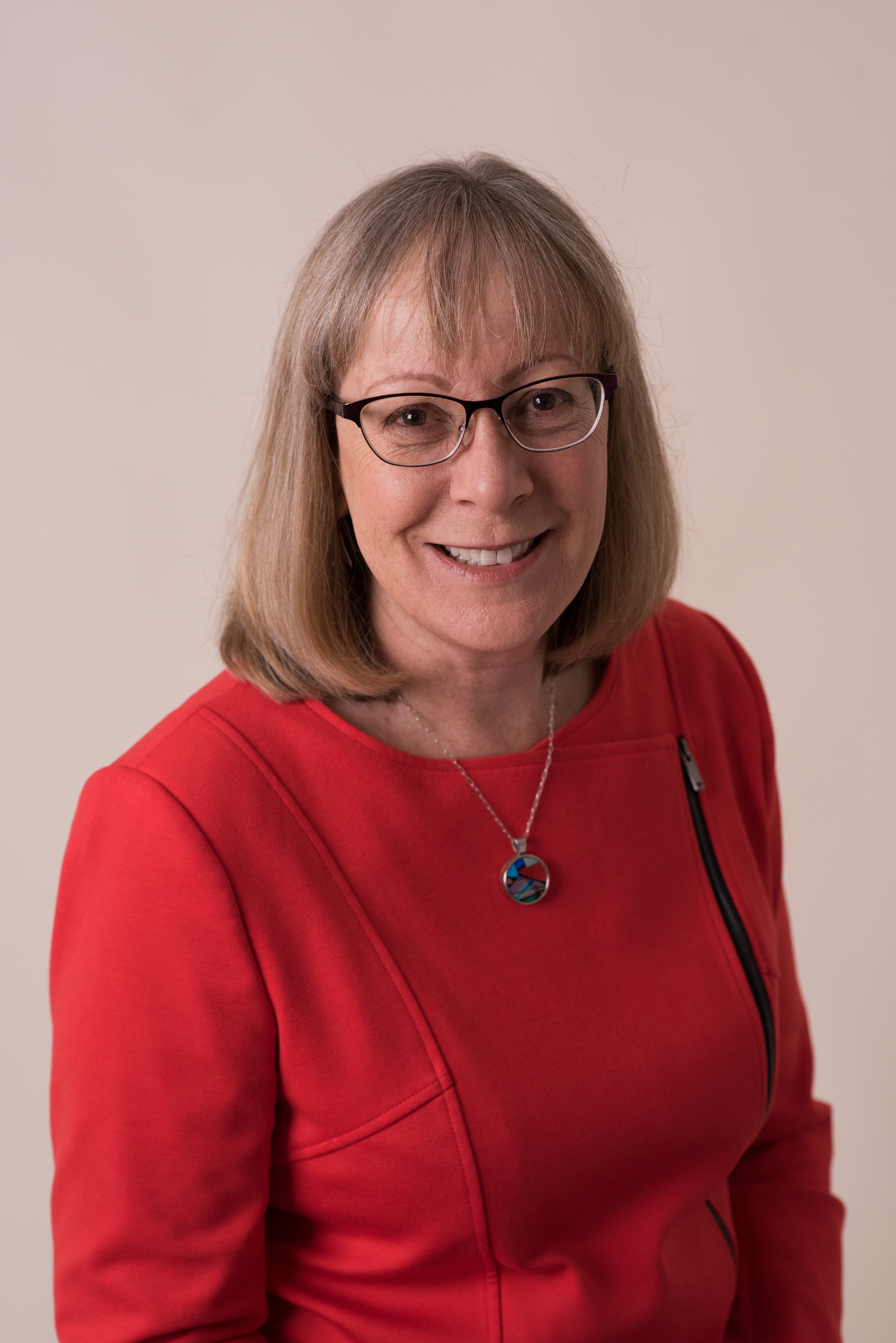

Parliamentary Secretary for Seniors of British Columbia
- In office February 10, 2020 – December 7, 2022
- Preceded by: Anne Kang
- Succeeded by: Harwinder Sandhu

Member of the British Columbia Legislative Assembly for Courtenay-Comox
- In office May 9, 2017 – September 21, 2024
- Preceded by: new district
- Succeeded by: Brennan Day

Personal details
- Party: New Democratic Party

Ronna-Rae Leonard is a Canadian politician, who was elected to the Legislative Assembly of British Columbia in the 2017 provincial election. She formerly represented the electoral district of Courtenay-Comox as a member of the British Columbia New Democratic Party caucus.

Initially declared elected by a margin of just nine votes over British Columbia Liberal Party candidate Jim Benninger on election day, her victory was confirmed on May 24, 2017 after the count of absentee ballots widened her lead to 189 votes. She was defeated in the 2024 British Columbia general election.

Prior to her election to the legislature, Leonard was a municipal councillor in Courtenay. She was the federal New Democratic Party's candidate in Vancouver Island North for the 2011 federal election, losing narrowly to John Duncan.

== Electoral record ==
=== Provincial elections ===
2024 British Columbia general election: Courtenay-Comox
| Party | Candidate | Votes | % | ±% | Expenditures |
|---|---|---|---|---|---|
| Conservative | Brennan Day | 13,481 | 38.83 | – | $54,803.68 |
| New Democratic | Ronna-Rae Leonard | 13,388 | 38.56 | -12.00 | $64,793.74 |
| Green | Arzeena Hamir | 7,202 | 20.74 | +1.15 | $54,310.40 |
| Independent | John Hedican | 504 | 1.45 | – | $7,247.19 |
| Independent | Devin Howell | 143 | 0.41 | – | $1,097.60 |
| Total valid votes/expense limit | | 34,718 | 99.89 | – | $71,700.08 |
| Total rejected ballots | | 37 | 0.11 | – | |
| Turnout | | 34,755 | 68.71 | +7.25 | |
| Registered voters | | 50,583 | | | |
| Conservative notional gain from New Democratic | | Swing | | +25.42 | |
Source: Elections BC

2020 British Columbia general election: Courtenay-Comox
| Party | Candidate | Votes | % | ±% | Expenditures |
|---|---|---|---|---|---|
| New Democratic | Ronna-Rae Leonard | 14,663 | 50.56 | +13.20 | $50,103.50 |
| Liberal | Brennan Day | 8,655 | 29.85 | −6.87 | $34,579.94 |
| Green | Gillian Anderson | 5,681 | 19.59 | +1.22 | $10,595.98 |
| Total valid votes | | 28,999 | 100.00 | – | |
| Total rejected ballots | | | | | |
| Turnout | | | | | |
| Registered voters | | | | | |
Source: Elections BC

2017 British Columbia general election: Courtenay-Comox
| Party | Candidate | Votes | % | Expenditures |
|---|---|---|---|---|
| New Democratic | Ronna-Rae Leonard | 10,886 | 37.36 | $55,597 |
| Liberal | Jim Benninger | 10,697 | 36.72 | $43,935 |
| Green | Ernie Sellentin | 5,351 | 18.37 | $8,612 |
| Conservative | Leah Catherine McCulloch | 2,201 | 7.55 | $14,981 |
| Total valid votes | | 29,135 | 100.00 | |
| Total rejected ballots | | 77 | 0.26 | |
| Turnout | | 29,212 | 66.89 | |
| Registered voters | | 43,671 | | |
Source: Elections BC

=== Federal elections ===
2011 Canadian federal election
| Party | Candidate | Votes | % | ±% |
|---|---|---|---|---|
| Conservative | John Duncan | 27,206 | 46.11 | +0.33 |
| New Democratic | Ronna-Rae Leonard | 25,379 | 43.01 | +1.58 |
| Liberal | Mike Holland | 3,018 | 5.11 | +0.93 |
| Green | Sue Moen | 2,995 | 5.08 | -2.90 |
| Independent | Jason Draper | 304 | 0.52 | -0.11 |
| Marxist–Leninist | Frank Martin | 57 | 0.10 | – |
| Total valid votes/Expense limit | | 59,003 | 100.0 | |
| Total rejected ballots | | 187 | 0.32 | |
| Turnout | | 59,190 | 66.39 | |
| Eligible voters | | 89,150 | | |
| Conservative hold | | Swing | | -0.62 |
