= Catherine J. Bell =

Canadian trade unionist and politician

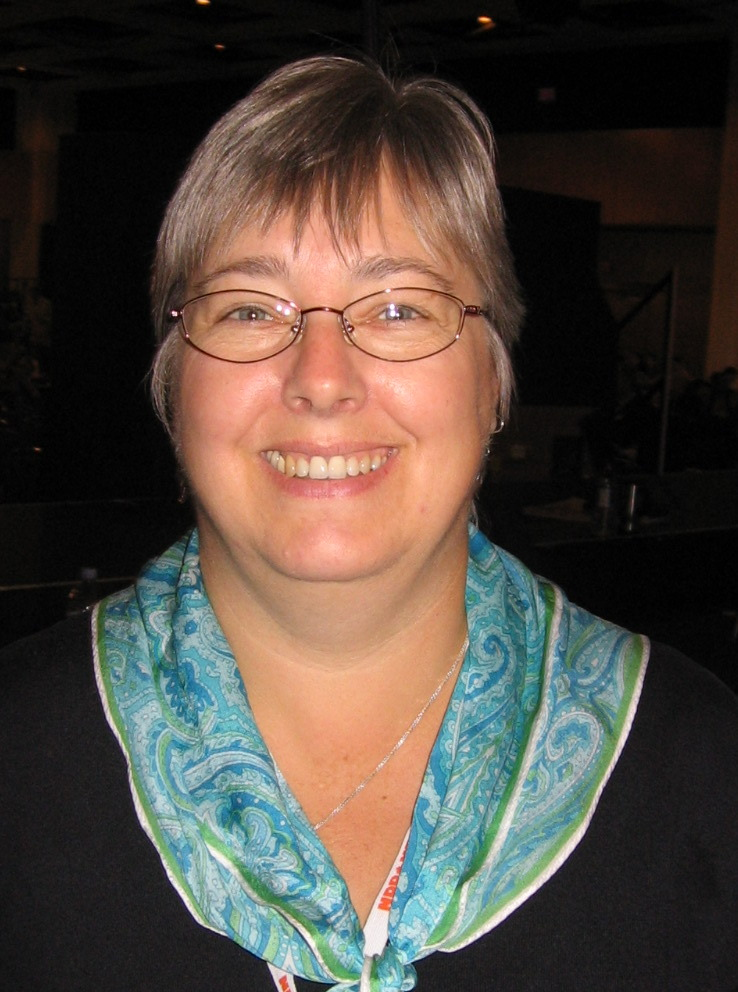

Member of Parliament for Vancouver Island North
- In office 2006–2008
- Preceded by: John Duncan
- Succeeded by: John Duncan

Personal details
- Born: October 25, 1954 (age 71) Comox, British Columbia
- Party: New Democratic Party
- Spouse: Roger Kishi
- Profession: Administrator, cook, labour and social activist

Catherine J. Bell (born October 25, 1954, in Comox, British Columbia) is a Canadian trade unionist and politician. She was elected as the New Democratic Party's candidate in the 2006 federal election in the riding of Vancouver Island North, serving for one term. While in Parliament, she served as the NDP's critic for natural resources.

Bell lives with her husband, Roger Kishi, in Cumberland, British Columbia. She previously served as vice-president of the B.C. Government and Service Employees Union. She is a member of the Social Planning and Research Council of B.C. and she has served on the social justice committee of the B.C. Federation of Labour. She is also a member and volunteer with the World Community Development Education Society, Co-Development Canada, the Comox Valley Coalition to Save Social Programs and the Comox Valley Women to Women Global Strategies.

Bell has continued with electoral reform work in parliament championed by Ed Broadbent in the 38th Canadian Parliament through a defeated bill and petition.

In the 2004 federal election, she finished second in Vancouver Island North, losing to Conservative Party of Canada incumbent John Duncan by 483 votes. In the 2006 federal election she defeated Duncan by 616 votes (23552 to 22936). However, in the 2008 election, she was unseated by Duncan by over 2400 votes.

In 2026, Bell endorsed Avi Lewis in that year's federal NDP leadership race.

A record of Bell's statements in the House is available.

== Election results ==
2008 Canadian federal election
Party	Candidate	Votes	%	±%	Expenditures
Conservative	John Duncan	26,166	45.78	+5.17	$76,173
New Democratic	Catherine J. Bell	23,681	41.43	-0.29	$80,622
Green	Philip Stone	4,563	7.98	+3.14	$12,309
Liberal	Geoff Fleischer	2,391	4.18	-8.65	$2,026
Independent	Jason Draper	361	0.63	–	
Total valid votes/Expense limit		57,162	100.0		$171,130
Conservative gain from New Democratic		Swing		+2.73	

2006 Canadian federal election
Party	Candidate	Votes	%	±%	Expenditures
New Democratic	Catherine J. Bell	23,561	41.72	+7.23	$80,265
Conservative	John Duncan	22,931	40.61	+5.20	$91,651
Liberal	Jim Mitchell	7,243	12.83	-8.62	$28,226
Green	Michael Mascall	2,735	4.84	-3.58	$8,685
Total valid votes		56,470	100.0		
New Democratic gain from Conservative		Swing		+1.02	

2004 Canadian federal election
Party	Candidate	Votes	%	±%	Expenditures
Conservative	John Duncan	18,733	35.41	-15.62	$47,274
New Democratic	Catherine J. Bell	18,250	34.49	+22.78	$43,372
Liberal	Noor Ahmed	11,352	21.45	-3.39	$78,890
Green	Pam Munroe	4,456	8.42	+3.22	$26,376
Marxist–Leninist	Jack East	111	0.20	+0.02	
Total valid votes		52,902	100.0		
Total rejected ballots		136	0.26	+0.01	
Turnout		53,038	65.79	+1.31	
Conservative hold		Swing		-19.20	
Change for the Conservatives is based on the combined total of the Canadian Alliance and the Progressive Conservatives.

New Democratic Party
Candidate	Residence	March 7
Catherine J. Bell	Cumberland	X
Erik Eriksson	Courtenay	
Monica Judd	Campbell River	
