= Courtenay—Alberni =

Federal electoral district in British Columbia, Canada

British Columbia electoral district
- Interactive map of riding boundaries from the 2025 federal election. Points indicate the cities of Courtenay and Port Alberni.

Federal electoral district
- Legislature: House of Commons
MP
Gord Johns
New Democratic
- District created: 2013
- First contested: 2015
- Last contested: 2025
- District webpage: profile, map

Demographics
- Population (2011): 110,391
- Electors (2019): 100,510
- Area (km²): 8,571
- Pop. density (per km²): 12.9
- Census division(s): Alberni-Clayoquot, Comox Valley, Nanaimo, Powell River
- Census subdivision(s): Nanaimo (part), Courtenay (part), Port Alberni, Parksville, Qualicum Beach, Cumberland, Lantzville, Tofino, Ucluelet, Marktosis

Courtenay—Alberni is a federal electoral district in British Columbia, Canada. It is around the latitudinal centre of Vancouver Island. It encompasses a portion of B.C. formerly included in the electoral districts of Nanaimo—Alberni and Vancouver Island North.

Courtenay—Alberni was created by the 2012 federal electoral boundaries redistribution and was legally defined in the 2013 representation order. It came into effect upon the call of the 42nd Canadian federal election, polling for which took place in October 2015.

== Demographics ==
Panethnic groups in Courtenay—Alberni (2011−2021)
Panethnic group	2021		2016		2011	
Panethnic group	Pop.	%	Pop.	%	Pop.	%
European (Note: Statistic includes all persons that did not make up part of a visible minority or an indigenous identity.)	104,325	85.24%	96,505	86.19%	95,360	88.44%
Indigenous	11,625	9.5%	10,475	9.36%	8,585	7.96%
East Asian (Note: Statistic includes total responses of "Chinese", "Korean", and "Japanese" under visible minority section on census.)	1,835	1.5%	1,735	1.55%	1,460	1.35%
Southeast Asian (Note: Statistic includes total responses of "Filipino" and "Southeast Asian" under visible minority section on census.)	1,665	1.36%	1,105	0.99%	870	0.81%
South Asian	1,320	1.08%	1,110	0.99%	615	0.57%
African	570	0.47%	520	0.46%	330	0.31%
Latin American	465	0.38%	170	0.15%	290	0.27%
Middle Eastern (Note: Statistic includes total responses of "West Asian" and "Arab" under visible minority section on census.)	190	0.16%	80	0.07%	60	0.06%
Other (Note: Statistic includes total responses of "Visible minority, n.i.e." and "Multiple visible minorities" under visible minority section on census.)	410	0.33%	275	0.25%	260	0.24%
Total responses	122,395	97.83%	111,970	97.67%	107,825	97.73%
Total population	125,116	100%	114,647	100%	110,324	100%
Notes: Totals greater than 100% due to multiple origin responses. Demographics based on 2012 Canadian federal electoral redistribution riding boundaries.

According to the 2011 Canadian census

Languages: 90.8% English, 2.2% French, 1.8% German
Religions: 45.1% Christian (11.9% Catholic, 8.3% United Church, 7.7% Anglican, 2.5% Baptist, 2.0% Lutheran, 1.3% Presbyterian, 1.2% Pentecostal, 10.2% Other), 3.0% Other, 51.9% No religion
Median income (2010): $26,754
Average income (2010): $34,319
Main industries: Retail trade (14.4% of labour force), Health care and social assistance (12.1%)

== Members of Parliament ==
This riding has elected the following members of the House of Commons of Canada:

Parliament	Years	Member	Party
Courtenay—Alberni; Riding created from Nanaimo—Alberni and Vancouver Island North
42nd	2015–2019	Gord Johns	New Democratic
43rd	2019–2021	Gord Johns	New Democratic
44th	2021–2025	Gord Johns	New Democratic
45th	2025–present	Gord Johns	New Democratic

== Election results ==
View source data.
Graph of election results in Courtenay—Alberni (minor parties that never got 2% of the vote or didn't run consistently are omitted)

=== 2023 representation order ===
2025 Canadian federal election
Party	Candidate	Votes	%	±%	Expenditures
New Democratic	Gord Johns	31,617	39.64	–3.24	$107,752.57
Conservative	Kris McNichol	28,028	35.14	+3.84	$98,868.84
Liberal	Brian Cameron	18,078	22.66	+9.05	$48,661.26
Green	Chris Markevich	1,352	1.70	–5.36	
People's	Thomas Gamble	427	0.54	–4.47	$3,486.49
Animal Protection	Teresa Knight	195	0.24	–	$3,570.37
Christian Heritage	Jesse Musial	69	0.09	–	$306.25
Total valid votes/expense limit		79,766	99.54	–	$152,320.49
Total rejected ballots		367	0.46	+0.15	
Turnout		80,133	73.85	+8.49	
Eligible voters		108,515			
New Democratic notional hold		Swing		–3.54	
Source: Elections Canada

2021 federal election redistributed results
Party	Vote	%
New Democratic	29,045	42.88
Conservative	21,205	31.30
Liberal	9,222	13.61
Green	4,776	7.05
People's	3,384	5.00
Others	108	0.16

=== 2013 representation order ===
Map of the election results of the 2019 Canadian Federal Election by polling station in Courtenay—Alberni

2021 Canadian federal election
Party	Candidate	Votes	%	±%	Expenditures
New Democratic	Gord Johns	30,612	44.21	+2.99	$102,309.88
Conservative	Mary Lee	22,181	32.03	–1.09	$99,155.22
Liberal	Susan Farlinger	9,276	13.40	+1.47	$37,061.04
Green	Susanne Lawson	3,590	5.18	–8.32	$9,378.63
People's	Robert Eppich	3,467	5.01	–	$6,474.87
Marxist–Leninist	Barbara Biley	124	0.18	–0.06	none listed
Total valid votes/expense limit		69,250	99.69	–	$131,260.27
Total rejected ballots		215	0.31	–0.18	
Turnout		69,465	65.35	–6.05	
Eligible voters		106,293			
New Democratic hold		Swing		+2.04	
Source: Elections Canada

2019 Canadian federal election
Party	Candidate	Votes	%	±%	Expenditures
New Democratic	Gord Johns	29,790	41.22	+3.16	$126,481.09
Conservative	Byron Horner	23,936	33.12	+4.89	$95,576.91
Green	Sean Wood	9,762	13.51	+1.76	$14,805.72
Liberal	Jonah Baden Gowans	8,620	11.93	–9.85	$11,728.11
Marxist–Leninist	Barbara Biley	172	0.24	+0.04	none listed
Total valid votes/expense limit		72,280	99.51	–	$123,697.56
Total rejected ballots		359	0.49	+0.23	
Turnout		72,639	71.40	–4.50	
Eligible voters		101,731			
New Democratic hold		Swing		–0.87	
Source: Elections Canada

2015 Canadian federal election
Party	Candidate	Votes	%	±%	Expenditures
New Democratic	Gord Johns	26,582	38.06	–2.66	$124,072.44
Conservative	John Duncan	19,714	28.22	–16.66	$92,251.34
Liberal	Carrie Powell-Davidson	15,212	21.78	+15.06	$32,002.88
Green	Glenn Sollitt	8,201	11.74	+4.89	$124,891.17
Marxist–Leninist	Barbara Biley	140	0.20	–	none listed
Total valid votes/expense limit		69,849	99.74		$231,958.67
Total rejected ballots		185	0.26	–	
Turnout		70,034	75.90	–	
Eligible voters		92,266			
New Democratic notional gain from Conservative		Swing		–7.00	
This riding was created from Nanaimo—Alberni and Vancouver Island North, both of which elected a Conservative candidate in the last election. John Duncan was the incumbent from Vancouver Island North.
Source: Elections Canada

2011 federal election redistributed results
Party	Vote	%
Conservative	25,797	44.89
New Democratic	23,400	40.72
Green	3,935	6.85
Liberal	3,860	6.72
Others	480	0.84

== See also ==
- List of Canadian electoral districts
- Historical federal electoral districts of Canada
