= John Duncan (Canadian politician) =

Canadian politician

The Honourable John Duncan PC

Chief Government Whip
- In office July 15, 2013 – 4 August 2015
- Prime Minister: Stephen Harper
- Preceded by: Gordon O'Connor
- Succeeded by: Andrew Leslie

Minister of Aboriginal Affairs and Northern Development
- In office August 6, 2010 – February 15, 2013
- Prime Minister: Stephen Harper
- Preceded by: Chuck Strahl
- Succeeded by: James Moore

Member of Parliament for Vancouver Island North (North Island—Powell River; 1993–1997)
- In office October 25, 1993 – January 23, 2006
- Preceded by: Ray Skelly
- Succeeded by: Catherine J. Bell
- In office October 14, 2008 – October 19, 2015
- Preceded by: Catherine J. Bell
- Succeeded by: Rachel Blaney

Personal details
- Born: John Morris Duncan; December 19, 1948 (age 77) Winnipeg, Manitoba, Canada
- Party: Conservative
- Profession: Forestry

John Morris Duncan PC (born December 19, 1948) is a Canadian politician. He served as a Member of the Parliament of Canada from 1993 to January 2006 and again from October 2008 until August 2015. On August 6, 2010, he was appointed to the Canadian Cabinet as Minister of Aboriginal Affairs and Northern Development, Federal Interlocutor for Métis and Non-Status Indians, and Minister responsible for the Canadian Northern Economic Development Agency until his resignation on February 15, 2013 over his inappropriate written communication to the Tax Court of Canada. He later returned to Cabinet as Chief Government Whip, and served in that capacity until the 2015 election, which saw both Duncan's own defeat and the defeat of the government.

== Education ==
Born in Winnipeg, Manitoba, and raised in British Columbia, Duncan attended the University of British Columbia and graduated with a B.Sc. F from their Faculty of Forestry in 1972. Duncan's first experience as an elected official was as an alderman in Ucluelet, British Columbia from 1982 to 1983.

== Entrance to politics ==
In the 1993 election, Duncan was elected as a member of the Reform Party. He has served in all that party's incarnations up until the 2006 federal election, when he lost his seat to Catherine J. Bell of the New Democratic Party by 630 votes.

Duncan was the Conservative Party's Official Opposition Critic for Natural Resources. During that time he served on the Natural Resources Committee. He helped shape Conservative Party policy on west coast offshore oil and gas, softwood lumber trade and the pine beetle epidemic.

While in parliament, he was a member of the "Restaurant Caucus" in the House of Commons, a group of MPs who have interests in the restaurant industry.

Duncan's Private Member's Bill C - 259 passed the 38th Parliament to receive Royal Assent to eliminate the excise tax on jewelry. Duncan made parliamentary history as the first MP to have a Private Member's bill related to cutting taxation pass.

He won the Vancouver Island North Conservative Party nomination for the 2008 federal election and was elected with 45.78% of the vote.

On December 2, 2008, the New Democratic Party asked the RCMP to investigate John Duncan's alleged secret recording of a private NDP conference. He had apparently received the invitation to participate by mistake, in place of NDP MP Linda Duncan who had "a similar email address". This happened within the context of the 2008–09 Canadian parliamentary dispute.

On August 6, 2010, in a minor cabinet shuffle, he joined cabinet as Minister of Aboriginal Affairs and Northern Development.

Under the Harper government, several key bills with a direct effect on aboriginal communities have stalled. As a result, First Nations across Canada have embarked on a widespread and prolonged series of demonstrations under the banner of "Idle No More". In addition, Attawapiskat chief Theresa Spence began a fast in December 2012 to demand a meeting with Harper and a Crown representative. In response, Duncan wrote to Spence requesting she give up her hunger strike and meet with him. "I didn't ask for Minister Duncan," Spence replied. "And I have dealt with him before. When I observe him, he doesn't have a mind of his own because, before he would answer a question, he would always look at his people. He's not the Prime Minister."

On February 15, 2013, he resigned from his cabinet position as Minister of Aboriginal Affairs and Northern Development after improperly advocating to a tax court on behalf of a constituent in June 2011, and was replaced by James Moore. He returned to cabinet in the more junior role as Minister of State and Chief Government Whip in July 2013.

In the 2015 Canadian federal election, Duncan sought reelection in the newly created riding of Courtenay—Alberni, but was defeated by Gord Johns of the NDP.

== Electoral record ==
2015 Canadian federal election: Courtenay—Alberni
Party	Candidate	Votes	%	±%	Expenditures
New Democratic	Gord Johns	26,582	38.06	–2.66	$124,072.44
Conservative	John Duncan	19,714	28.22	–16.66	$92,251.34
Liberal	Carrie Powell-Davidson	15,212	21.78	+15.06	$32,002.88
Green	Glenn Sollitt	8,201	11.74	+4.89	$124,891.17
Marxist–Leninist	Barbara Biley	140	0.20	–	none listed
Total valid votes/expense limit		69,849	99.74		$231,958.67
Total rejected ballots		185	0.26	–	
Turnout		70,034	75.90	–	
Eligible voters		92,266			
New Democratic notional gain from Conservative		Swing		–7.00	
This riding was created from Nanaimo—Alberni and Vancouver Island North, both of which elected a Conservative candidate in the last election. John Duncan was the incumbent from Vancouver Island North.
Source: Elections Canada

2011 Canadian federal election: Vancouver Island North
Party	Candidate	Votes	%	±%
Conservative	John Duncan	27,206	46.11	+0.33
New Democratic	Ronna-Rae Leonard	25,379	43.01	+1.58
Liberal	Mike Holland	3,018	5.11	+0.93
Green	Sue Moen	2,995	5.08	-2.90
Independent	Jason Draper	304	0.52	-0.11
Marxist–Leninist	Frank Martin	57	0.10	–
Total valid votes/Expense limit		59,003	100.0	
Total rejected ballots		187	0.32	
Turnout		59,190	66.39	
Eligible voters		89,150		
Conservative hold		Swing		-0.62

2008 Canadian federal election: Vancouver Island North
Party	Candidate	Votes	%	±%	Expenditures
Conservative	John Duncan	26,166	45.78	+5.17	$76,173
New Democratic	Catherine J. Bell	23,681	41.43	-0.29	$80,622
Green	Philip Stone	4,563	7.98	+3.14	$12,309
Liberal	Geoff Fleischer	2,391	4.18	-8.65	$2,026
Independent	Jason Draper	361	0.63	–	
Total valid votes/Expense limit		57,162	100.0		$171,130
Conservative gain from New Democratic		Swing		+2.73	

2006 Canadian federal election: Vancouver Island North
Party	Candidate	Votes	%	±%	Expenditures
New Democratic	Catherine J. Bell	23,561	41.72	+7.23	$80,265
Conservative	John Duncan	22,931	40.61	+5.20	$91,651
Liberal	Jim Mitchell	7,243	12.83	-8.62	$28,226
Green	Michael Mascall	2,735	4.84	-3.58	$8,685
Total valid votes		56,470	100.0		
New Democratic gain from Conservative		Swing		+1.02	

2004 Canadian federal election: Vancouver Island North
Party	Candidate	Votes	%	±%	Expenditures
Conservative	John Duncan	18,733	35.41	-15.62	$47,274
New Democratic	Catherine J. Bell	18,250	34.49	+22.78	$43,372
Liberal	Noor Ahmed	11,352	21.45	-3.39	$78,890
Green	Pam Munroe	4,456	8.42	+3.22	$26,376
Marxist–Leninist	Jack East	111	0.20	+0.02	
Total valid votes		52,902	100.0		
Total rejected ballots		136	0.26	+0.01	
Turnout		53,038	65.79	+1.31	
Conservative hold		Swing		-19.20	
Change for the Conservatives is based on the combined total of the Canadian Alliance and the Progressive Conservatives.

2000 Canadian federal election: Vancouver Island North
Party	Candidate	Votes	%	±%	Expenditures
Alliance	John Duncan	24,844	51.03	+3.49	$42,203
Liberal	Daniel P. Smith	12,092	24.84	+3.92	$52,728
New Democratic	Alex Turner	5,701	11.71	-11.57	$10,377
Progressive Conservative	David R. Tingley	2,997	6.15	+2.71	$33
Green	Pam Munroe	2,532	5.20	+1.95	$6,295
Independent	John Krell	216	0.44	–	
Natural Law	Nancy More	205	0.42	-0.03	
Marxist–Leninist	Jack East	92	0.18	–	$90
Total valid votes		48,679	100.0		
Total rejected ballots		131	0.27	-0.07	
Turnout		48,810	64.48	+0.12	
Alliance hold		Swing		-0.22	
Change for the Canadian Alliance is based on the 1997 results of the Reform Party.

1997 Canadian federal election: Vancouver Island North
Party	Candidate	Votes	%	Expenditures
Reform	John Duncan	22,769	47.54	$31,625
New Democratic	Gilbert Popovich	11,152	23.28	$60,126
Liberal	David Durrant	10,024	20.92	$14,397
Progressive Conservative	Dave Tingley	1,650	3.44	$3,659
Green	Hazel Lennox	1,559	3.25	
Christian Heritage	John Krell	522	1.08	$2,001
Natural Law	Nancy More	218	0.45	
Total valid votes		47,894	100.0	
Total rejected ballots		161	0.34	
Turnout		48,055	64.36	
This riding was created from Comox—Alberni and North Island—Powell River, both of which elected a Reform candidate in the previous election. John Duncan was the incumbent from North Island—Powell River.

1993 Canadian federal election: North Island—Powell River
Party	Candidate	Votes	%	±%
Reform	John Duncan	18,256	39.28	+37.60
Liberal	Al Huddlestan	11,880	25.56	+9.45
New Democratic	Ray Skelly	7,823	16.83	–35.19
Progressive Conservative	Mark Von Schellwitz	3,673	7.90	–16.52
National	Mark A. Grenier	3,418	7.35	–
Green	Michael Mascall	1,015	2.18	+0.97
Natural Law	Wayne A. Melvin	254	0.55	–
Canada Party	James Peter Turner	158	0.34	–
Total valid votes		46,477	99.60	
Total rejected ballots		189	0.41	+0.17
Turnout		46,666	68.01	–9.21
Eligible voters		68,621		
Reform gain from New Democratic		Swing		+14.08
Source: Elections Canada

28th Canadian Ministry (2006–2015) – Cabinet of Stephen Harper
Cabinet posts (2)
Predecessor	Office	Successor
	Minister of State; 2013–2015 (NB: no portfolio specified - while Chief Government Whip)	
Chuck Strahl	Minister of Aboriginal Affairs and Northern Development; 2010–2013	James Moore
Special Parliamentary Responsibilities
Predecessor	Title	Successor
Gordon O'Connor	Chief Government Whip; 2013–2015	Andrew Leslie
