= Vancouver Island North =

Former federal electoral district in British Columbia, Canada

Coordinates: 50.27°N 126.96°W

British Columbia electoral district
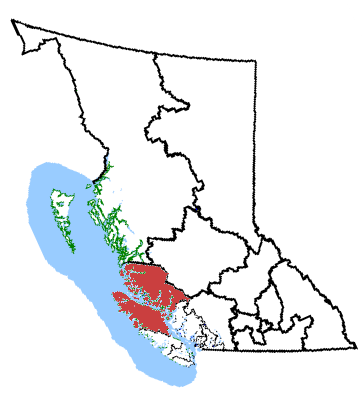
- Vancouver Island North in relation to other British Columbia federal electoral districts

Defunct federal electoral district
- Legislature: House of Commons
- District created: 1996
- District abolished: 2013
- First contested: 1997
- Last contested: 2011
- District webpage: profile, map

Demographics
- Population (2011): 118,374
- Electors (2011): 89,063
- Area (km²): 49,144.61
- Census subdivision(s): Campbell River, Comox, Courtenay, Port Hardy, Cumberland, Port McNeill, Comox-Strathcona A (Baynes Sound), Comox-Strathcona B (Lazo North), Comox-Strathcona C (Puntledge/Black Creek), Comox-Strathcona D (Oyster Bay - Buttle Lake)

Vancouver Island North is a former federal electoral district in British Columbia, Canada, that was represented in the House of Commons of Canada from 1997 to 2015.

== Geography ==
The district included the Regional Districts of Comox Valley, Strathcona, Mount Waddington and the southern half of Central Coast excluding Calvert Island and Hunter Island. These regional districts include the towns of Campbell River, Comox, Courtenay, Port Alice, Port McNeill, Port Hardy, Alert Bay, Quadra Island, Denman Island and Hornby Island.

== History ==
The electoral district was created in 1996 from Comox—Alberni and North Island—Powell River ridings.

The 2012 electoral redistribution dissolved the riding into the new ridings of North Island—Powell River and Courtenay—Alberni for the 2015 election.

=== Members of Parliament ===
This riding elected the following members of Parliament:

Parliament	Years	Member	Party
Riding created from Comox—Alberni and North Island—Powell River
36th	1997–2000	John Duncan	Reform
36th	2000–2000	John Duncan	Alliance
37th	2000–2003	John Duncan	Alliance
37th	2003–2004	John Duncan	Conservative
38th	2004–2006	John Duncan	Conservative
39th	2006–2008	Catherine J. Bell	New Democratic
40th	2008–2011	John Duncan	Conservative
41st	2011–2015	John Duncan	Conservative
Riding dissolved into North Island—Powell River and Courtenay—Alberni

== Election results ==
=== 2011 ===
2011 Canadian federal election
Party	Candidate	Votes	%	±%	Expenditures
Conservative	John Duncan	27,206	46.11	+0.33	$103,125.07
New Democratic	Ronna-Rae Leonard	25,379	43.01	+1.64	$86,891.93
Liberal	Mike Holland	3,039	5.15	+0.95	$33,424.83
Green	Sue Moen	3,018	5.11	–2.90	$6,744.47
Independent	Jason Draper	304	0.52	–0.12	$8.84
Marxist–Leninist	Frank Martin	57	0.10	–	none listed
Total valid votes/expense limit		59,003	99.68	–	$114,293.63
Total rejected ballots		187	0.32	+0.03	
Turnout		59,190	65.49	+0.92	
Eligible voters		90,374			
Conservative hold		Swing		–0.65	
Source: Elections Canada

=== 2008 ===
2008 Canadian federal election
Party	Candidate	Votes	%	±%	Expenditures
Conservative	John Duncan	25,963	45.78	+5.14	$69,069.92
New Democratic	Catherine J. Bell	23,466	41.38	–0.35	$78,617.17
Green	Philip Stone	4,544	8.01	+3.20	$12,234.83
Liberal	Geoff Fleischer	2,380	4.20	–8.63	$696.23
Independent	Jason Draper	362	0.64	–	$1,352.29
Total valid votes/expense limit		56,715	99.71	–	$109,871.27
Total rejected ballots		164	0.29	+0.05	
Turnout		56,879	64.58	–2.61	
Eligible voters		88,077			
Conservative gain from New Democratic		Swing		+2.75	
Source: Elections Canada

=== 2006 ===
2006 Canadian federal election
Party	Candidate	Votes	%	±%	Expenditures
New Democratic	Catherine J. Bell	23,552	41.73	+7.23	$75,355.84
Conservative	John Duncan	22,936	40.64	+5.23	$95,976.26
Liberal	Jim Mitchell	7,239	12.83	–8.63	$29,542.04
Green	Michael Mascall	2,715	4.81	–3.61	$8,685.04
Total valid votes/expense limit		56,442	99.76	–	$101,166.85
Total rejected ballots		133	0.24	–0.02	
Turnout		56,575	67.19	+1.40	
Eligible voters		84,200			
New Democratic gain from Conservative		Swing		+1.02	
Source: Elections Canada

Nomination contests

New Democratic Party
Candidate	Residence	August 14, 2005
Catherine J. Bell	Cumberland	X

=== 2004 ===
2004 Canadian federal election
Party	Candidate	Votes	%	±%	Expenditures
Conservative	John Duncan	18,733	35.41	–21.78	$46,145.62
New Democratic	Catherine J. Bell	18,250	34.50	+22.78	$43,592.78
Liberal	Noor Ahmed	11,352	21.46	–3.38	$78,890.72
Green	Pam Munroe	4,456	8.42	+3.22	$26,376.83
Marxist–Leninist	Jack East	111	0.21	+0.02	none listed
Total valid votes/expense limit		52,902	99.74	–	$96,776.98
Total rejected ballots		136	0.26	–0.01	
Turnout		53,038	65.79	+1.31	
Eligible voters		80,619			
Conservative hold		Swing		–22.28	
Change for the Conservatives is based on the combined total of the Canadian Alliance and the Progressive Conservatives.
Source: Elections Canada

Nomination contests

Conservative Party of Canada
Candidate	Residence	February 28
John Duncan	Campbell River	X

New Democratic Party
Candidate	Residence	March 7
Catherine J. Bell	Cumberland	X
Erik Eriksson	Courtenay	
Monica Judd	Campbell River	

Liberal Party of Canada
Candidate	Residence	February 22
Nooral Ahmed	Courtenay	X
David Lewis	Gold River	
Don Smith	Campbell River	

=== 2000 ===
2000 Canadian federal election
Party	Candidate	Votes	%	±%	Expenditures
Alliance	John Duncan	24,844	51.04	+3.50	$42,203
Liberal	Daniel P. Smith	12,092	24.84	+3.91	$52,728
New Democratic	Alex Turner	5,701	11.71	–11.57	$10,377
Progressive Conservative	David R. Tingley	2,997	6.16	+2.71	$33
Green	Pam Munroe	2,532	5.20	+1.95	$6,295
Independent	John A. Krell	216	0.44	–0.65	none listed
Natural Law	Nancy More	205	0.42	–0.03	none listed
Marxist–Leninist	Jack East	92	0.19	–	$90
Total valid votes		48,679	99.73		
Total rejected ballots		131	0.27	–0.07	
Turnout		48,810	64.48	+0.12	
Eligible voters		75,698			
Alliance hold		Swing		–0.22	
Change for the Canadian Alliance is based on the 1997 results of the Reform Party.
Source: Elections Canada

=== 1997 ===
1997 Canadian federal election
Party	Candidate	Votes	%	±%	Expenditures
Reform	John Duncan	22,769	47.54	–	$31,625
New Democratic	Gilbert Popovich	11,152	23.28	–	$60,126
Liberal	David Durrant	10,024	20.93	–	$14,397
Progressive Conservative	David R. Tingley	1,650	3.45	–	$3,659
Green	Hazel Lennox	1,559	3.26	–	none listed
Christian Heritage	John A. Krell	522	1.09	–	$2,001
Natural Law	Nancy More	218	0.46	–	none listed
Total valid votes		47,894	99.67		
Total rejected ballots		161	0.34	–	
Turnout		48,055	64.36	–	
Eligible voters		74,667			
This riding was created from Comox—Alberni and North Island—Powell River, both of which elected a Reform candidate in the previous election. John Duncan was the incumbent from North Island—Powell River.
Source: Elections Canada

== See also ==
- List of Canadian electoral districts
- Historical federal electoral districts of Canada
